= Miles Davis discography =

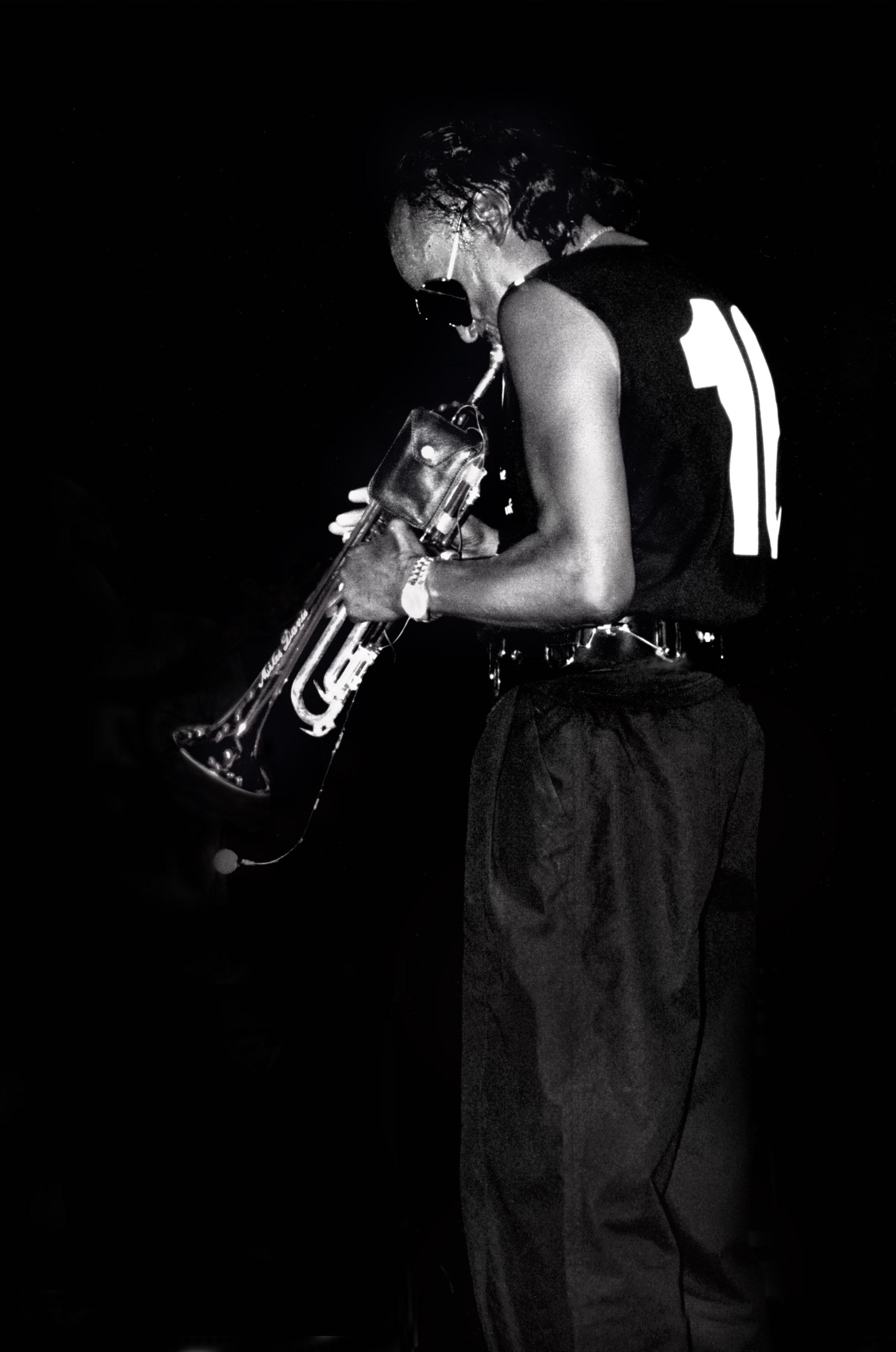
- Miles Davis, photo taken in The Hague in 1986
- Studio albums: 60
- Soundtrack albums: 4
- Live albums: 39
- Compilation albums: 46
- Singles: 57
- Video albums: 27
- Box sets: 27
- Collaborations: 72
- Remix albums: 3

This is an incomplete list, which will never be able to satisfy particular standards for completeness as it excludes bootlegs, mix tapes and other minor records by independent labels and unofficial sources.

Miles Davis was an American trumpeter, bandleader and musical composer. His discography consists of at least 60 studio albums and 39 live albums, as well as 46 compilation albums, 27 box sets, 4 soundtrack albums, 57 singles and 3 remix albums.

Davis' initial appearances on record were mainly as a member of bebop saxophonist Charlie Parker's quintet from 1944 through 1947 and released on the Savoy label. Davis made his debut as a leader in the 1946 sessions featuring Parker, pianist John Lewis, bassist Nelson Boyd and drummer Max Roach. Prestige Records released Davis' debut album, The New Sounds, in 1951. He recorded many studio albums under the Prestige label from 1951 through 1956, as well as Blue Moods, issued by Debut Records in 1955, and three sessions for Blue Note Records. The earliest Davis music released was recorded from April 4, 1945, through August 14, 1947, and reissued in CD format by Savoy Records under the title First Miles.

From 1949 through 1950, Davis recorded twelve tunes with a nonet consisting of other noted jazz musicians including arranger Gil Evans, Gerry Mulligan, Lee Konitz, John Lewis, Max Roach and Kenny Clarke. The arrangements for that group were scored for instruments rarely used in jazz such as French horn and tuba. These recordings, which were labeled cool jazz and eventually appeared on the album Birth of the Cool in 1957 by Capitol Records, marked an important influence on the future of jazz. He later signed to Columbia and released 'Round About Midnight on March 18, 1957. His acclaimed 1959 album Kind of Blue is generally stated to be the best-selling jazz album of all time, although the data are not conclusive. The follow-up album in 1960, Sketches of Spain, went gold.

He formed his Second Great Quintet in 1964. With the release of Miles in the Sky, Davis permanently abandoned hard bop, instead adopting jazz fusion and avant-garde jazz. In this era he released the studio album Bitches Brew, which was certified platinum, culminating in the long electric jams from the mid-1970s released as Pangaea, Agharta, and Dark Magus. After a six-year retirement, Davis released albums under the Columbia and Warner Bros. labels during the period between 1981 and 1991. These recordings combined jazz with popular music genres as he turned more toward the mainstream. He finished his music career with Doo-Bop, in which he experimentally combined jazz with hip-hop, his discography ultimately being extensively sampled in hip-hop, such as with beats from his 1972 album On the Corner.

== Discography ==
=== Studio albums ===
Title	Album details	Peak chart positions										Certifications
Title	Album details	US	Top Jazz Albums	Cont. Jazz Albums	BEL (Fla.)	FRA	NLD	NZL	NOR	SWE	SWI	Certifications
1951–1961: Prestige/Blue Note/Debut
10" LPs
The New Sounds	Released: 1951; Recorded: October 5, 1951; Label: Prestige; Format: 10" LP											
Young Man with a Horn	Released: 1953; Recorded: May 9, 1952; Label: Blue Note; Format: 10-inch LP											
Blue Period	Released: 1953; Recorded: January 17, 1951, October 5, 1951; Label: Prestige; Format: 10-inch LP											
The Compositions of Al Cohn	Released: 1953; Recorded: February 19, 1953; Label: Prestige; Format: 10-inch LP											
Miles Davis Volume 2	Released: 1953; Recorded: April 20, 1953; Label: Blue Note; Format: 10-inch LP											
Miles Davis, Volume 3	Released: 1954; Recorded: March 6, 1954; Label: Blue Note; Format: 10-inch LP											
Miles Davis Quartet	Released: 1954; Recorded: May 19, 1953, March 15, 1954; Label: Prestige; Format: 10-inch LP											
Miles Davis All Star Sextet	Released: 1954; Recorded: April 29, 1954; Label: Prestige; Format: 10-inch LP											
Miles Davis Quintet	Released: 1954; Recorded: April 3, 1954; Label: Prestige; Format: 10-inch LP											
Miles Davis with Sonny Rollins	Released: 1954; Recorded: June 29, 1954; Label: Prestige; Format: 10-inch LP											
Miles Davis All Stars, Volume 1	Released: 1955; Recorded: December 24, 1954; Label: Prestige; Format: 10-inch LP											
Miles Davis All Stars, Volume 2	Released: 1955; Recorded: December 24, 1954; Label: Prestige; Format: 10-inch LP											
12" LPs												
The Musings of Miles	Released: 1955; Recorded: June 7, 1955; Label: Prestige; Format: LP											
Blue Moods	Released: 1955; Recorded: July 9, 1955; Label: Debut; Format: LP											
Miles: The New Miles Davis Quintet	Released: 1956; Recorded: November 16, 1955; Label: Prestige; Format: LP											
Quintet / Sextet	Released: 1956; Recorded: August 5, 1955; Label: Prestige; Format: LP											
Collectors' Items	Released: 1956; Recorded: January 30, 1953 – March 15, 1956; Label: Prestige; Format: LP											
Cookin'	Released: 1957; Recorded: October 26, 1956; Label: Prestige; Format: LP											
Relaxin'	Released: 1958; Recorded: May 11, 1956 – October 26, 1956; Label: Prestige; Format: LP											
Workin'	Released: 1960; Recorded: May 11, 1956 – October 26, 1956; Label: Prestige; Format: LP											
Steamin'	Released: 1961; Recorded: May 11, 1956 – October 26, 1956; Label: Prestige; Format: LP											
1955–1976: Columbia years
'Round About Midnight	Released: 1957; Recorded: October 26, 1955 – June 5, 1956; Label: Columbia; Format: LP	—	—	—	—	—	—	—	—	—	—	
Miles Ahead	Released: 1957; Recorded: May 6, 1957 – August 22, 1957; Label: Columbia; Format: LP	—	—	—	—	—	—	—	—	—	—	
Milestones	Released: 1958; Recorded: April 2, 1958 – April 3, 1958; Label: Columbia; Format: LP	—	—	—	—	—	—	—	—	—	—	
Jazz Track	Released: 1959; Recorded: December 4, 1957, May 26, 1958; Label: Columbia; Format: LP	—	—	—	—	—	—	—	—	—	—	
Porgy and Bess	Released: 1959; Recorded: July 22, 1958 – August 18, 1958; Label: Columbia; Format: LP	—	—	—	—	—	—	—	—	—	—	UK: Silver
Kind of Blue	Released: August 17, 1959; Recorded: March 2, 1959 – April 22, 1959; Label: Columbia; Format: LP, Reel Tape	—	10	—	21^{[A]}	29	—	—	40	58	—	US: 5× Platinum AUS: 2× Platinum; UK: 2× Platinum; FIMI: Platinum
Sketches of Spain	Released: July 18, 1960; Recorded: November 15, 1959 – November 20, 1959; Label: Columbia; Format: LP, Reel Tape	—	13^{[B]}	—	—	—	—	—	—	—	—	US: Platinum UK: Gold
Someday My Prince Will Come	Released: December 11, 1961; Recorded: March 7, 1961 – March 21, 1961; Label: Columbia; Format: LP	116	—	—	—	—	—	—	—	—	—	
Seven Steps to Heaven	Released: July 15, 1963; Recorded: April 16, 1963 – May 14, 1963; Label: Columbia; Format: LP, Reel Tape	62	—	—	—	—	—	—	—	—	—	
Quiet Nights	Released: December 16, 1963; Recorded: July 27, 1962 – April 17, 1963; Label: Columbia; Format: LP, Reel Tape	93	—	—	—	—	—	—	—	—	—	
E.S.P.	Released: 1965; Recorded: January 20, 1965 – January 22, 1965; Label: Columbia; Format: LP	—	—	—	—	—	—	—	—	—	—	
Miles Smiles	Released: 1967; Recorded: October 24, 1966 – October 25, 1966; Label: Columbia; Format: LP, Reel Tape	—	6	—	—	—	—	—	—	—	—	
Sorcerer	Released: 1967; Recorded: August 21, 1962 – May 24, 1967; Label: Columbia; Format: LP	—	16	—	—	—	—	—	—	—	—	
Nefertiti	Released: March, 1968; Recorded: June 7, 1967 – July 19, 1967; Label: Columbia; Format: LP	—	8	—	—	—	—	—	—	—	—	
Miles in the Sky	Released: 1968; Recorded: January 16, 1968 – May 17, 1968; Label: Columbia; Format: LP	—	5	—	—	—	—	—	—	—	—	
Filles de Kilimanjaro	Released: December 1968; Recorded: June 19, 1968 – September 24, 1968; Label: Columbia; Format: LP, Reel Tape	—	13	—	—	—	—	—	—	—	—	
In a Silent Way	Released: July 30, 1969; Recorded: February 18, 1969; Label: Columbia; Format: LP	134	3	—	—	—	—	—	—	—	—	UK: Gold
Bitches Brew	Released: March 30, 1970; Recorded: August 19, 1969 – January 28, 1970; Label: Columbia; Format: LP, Reel Tape, 8 Track Tape	35	1	—	80	—	—	—	—	—	—	US: Platinum UK: Gold
Jack Johnson	Released: February 24, 1971; Recorded: February 18 – April 7, 1970; Label: Columbia; Format: LP, Reel Tape, CD, CS	159	4	—	—	—	—	—	—	—	—	
Live-Evil	Released: November 17, 1971; Recorded: February 6, 1970 – December 19, 1970; Label: Columbia; Format: LP, CD	125	4	—	—	—	—	—	—	—	—	
On the Corner	Released: October 11, 1972; Recorded: June 1, 1972 – June 6, 1972; Label: Columbia; Format: LP, CD	156	1	—	—	—	—	—	—	—	—	
Big Fun	Released: April 19, 1974; Recorded: November 19, 1969 – June 12, 1972; Label: Columbia; Format: LP, CD	179	6	—	—	—	—	—	—	—	—	
Get Up with It	Released: November 22, 1974; Recorded: May 19, 1970 – October 7, 1974; Label: Columbia; Format: LP, CD	141	8	—	—	—	—	—	—	—	—	
Water Babies	Released: November 2, 1976; Recorded: June 1967 – November 1968; Label: Columbia; Format: LP, CD	190	17	—	—	—	—	—	—	—	—	
1981–1991: Columbia/Warner Bros.
The Man with the Horn	Released: July 1981; Recorded: June 1, 1980 – May 6, 1981; Label: Columbia; Format: LP, CD	53	1	—	—	—	—	46	35	30	—	
Star People	Released: April 1983; Recorded: September 1, 1982 – January 5, 1983; Label: Columbia; Format: LP, CD	136	4	—	—	—	—	—	—	—	—	
Decoy	Released: June 1984; Recorded: June 30, 1983 – September 11, 1983; Label: Columbia; Format: LP, CD	169	1	—	—	—	—	—	—	—	—	
You're Under Arrest	Released: September 9, 1985; Recorded: January 26, 1984 – January 1985; Label: Columbia; Format: LP, CD	111	3	—	—	—	—	—	—	26	19	
Tutu	Released: September 29, 1986; Recorded: January 6, 1986 – March 25, 1986; Label: Warner Bros.; Format: LP, CD, CS	141	1	5	—	—	—	—	—	33	27	FRA: Gold
Amandla	Released: May 18, 1989; Recorded: December 1988 – early 1989; Label: Warner Bros.; Format: LP, CD, CS	177	—	1	—	—	—	—	—	43	24	
Aura	Released: September 12, 1989; Recorded: January 31, 1985 – February 4, 1985; Label: Columbia; Format: LP, CD, CS	—	—	17	—	—	—	—	—	—	—	
Doo-Bop	Released: June 30, 1992; Recorded: January 19, 1991 – February 1991; Label: Warner Bros.; Format: LP, CD, CS	190	—	1	—	—	—	21	—	40	7	GER: Gold
Rubberband	Released: September 6, 2019; Recorded: 1985; Label: Warner Bros.; Format: LP, CD, digital download	—	—	1	—	—	—	—	—	—	—	
"—" denotes releases that did not chart or were not released.

- A the September 30, 2008, re-release Kind of Blue – 50th Anniversary Collection reached number 92 in the Belgian albums chart in 2009.
- B 1987 reissue

=== Live albums ===
Year	Title	Label	Format	Date recorded	Peak chart positions		Certifications (sales thresholds)
Year	Title	Label	Format	Date recorded	US	Top Jazz Albums	Certifications (sales thresholds)
September 1961	In Person Friday Night at the Blackhawk, San Francisco, Volume 1	Columbia	LP, Reel tape	April 21, 1961	—	—	
September 1961	In Person Saturday Night at the Blackhawk, San Francisco, Volume 2	Columbia	LP, Reel tape	April 22, 1961	—	—	
July 16, 1962	Miles Davis at Carnegie Hall	Columbia	LP, CD	May 19, 1961	59	—	
1963	Miles & Monk at Newport	Columbia	LP, CD	May 1 – July 2, 1958	—	—	
July 13, 1964	Miles Davis in Europe	Columbia	LP, Reel tape, CD	July 27, 1963	116	—	
February 1, 1965	Miles in Berlin	CBS	LP	September 25, 1964	—	—	
February 23, 1965	My Funny Valentine	Columbia	LP, CD	February 12, 1964	138	—	
January 17, 1966	Four & More	Columbia	LP	February 12, 1964	—	—	
1967	At Plugged Nickel, Chicago, Vol. 1	CBS	LP	December 22–23, 1965	—	—	
1967	At Plugged Nickel, Chicago, Vol. 2	CBS	LP	December 22–23, 1965	—	—	
June 6, 1969	Miles in Tokyo	CBS/Sony	LP, CD	July 14, 1964	—	—	
October 28, 1970	Miles Davis at Fillmore: Live at the Fillmore East	Columbia	LP, CD	June 17–20, 1970	123	1	
1973	Black Beauty: Miles Davis at Fillmore West	Columbia	LP, CD	April 10, 1970	—	—	
1973	In Concert	Columbia	LP, CD	September 29, 1972	152	13	
September 28, 1973	Jazz at the Plaza Vol. I	Columbia	LP, CD	September 9, 1958	—	—	
1975	Agharta	Columbia	LP, CS, CD	February 1, 1975	168	16	
1976	Pangaea	Columbia	LP, CS, CD	February 1, 1975	—	—	
1977	In Paris Festival International De Jazz May, 1949 (with Tadd Dameron Quintet)	Columbia	LP, CD	May 8–15, 1949	—	—	
1977	Dark Magus	Columbia	LP, CD	March 30, 1974	—	—	
1982	We Want Miles	CBS	LP, CD	June 27 – October 4, 1981	159	2	
1984	Amsterdam Concert	Celluloid	LP, CD	December 8, 1957	—	—	
1987	Live Miles: More Music from the Legendary Carnegie Hall Concert	Columbia	LP, CD	May 19, 1961	—	—	
1992	Miles! Miles! Miles!	Sony	LP, CD	October 4, 1981	—	—	
1993	Miles & Quincy Live at Montreux	Warner Bros.	CD, SC	July 8, 1991	—	1	GER: Gold
August 29, 1993	1969 Miles: Festiva de Juan Pins	Sony	CD	July 25, 1969	—	—	
1996	At The Royal Roost 1948 - At Birdland 1950, 1951, 1953	Charly	CD	September 25, 1948 – May 16, 1953	_	_	
May 14, 1996	Live Around the World	Warner Bros.	LP, CD, CS	August 1, 1988 – August 1, 1991	—	4	GER: Gold
2000	Miles in Paris	Warner Bros.	VHS, CD	November 3, 1989	—	—	
April 17, 2001	At Newport 1958	Columbia/Legacy	CD, LP	July 3, 1958	—	—	
July 17, 2001	Live at the Fillmore East, March 7, 1970: It's About That Time	Columbia/Legacy	CD	March 7, 1970	—	3	
June 3, 2003	In Person Friday and Saturday Nights at the Blackhawk	Columbia	CD, LP, Reel Tape	April 21–22, 1961	68	—	
January 27, 2004	Birdland 1951	Blue Note	CD	February 17 – September 29, 1951	—	—	
July 31, 2007	Live at the 1963 Monterey Jazz Festival	Monterey Jazz Festival Records	CD	September 20, 1963	—	8	
February 8, 2011	Bitches Brew Live	Columbia/Legacy	CD	July 5, 1969 – August 29, 1970	—	—	
September 20, 2011	Live in Europe 1967: Best of the Bootleg Vol. 1	Columbia/Legacy	CD	1967	171	—	
2020	The Lost Septet	Sleepy Night	2CD	November 5, 1971	—	—	
June 25, 2021	Merci Miles! Live at Vienne	Warner, Rhino	2CD, 2LP	July 1, 1991	—	—	
	"—" denotes releases that did not chart or were not released.						

=== Compilations and remixes ===
Title	Album details	Peak chart positions										Certifications (sales thresholds)
Title	Album details	US	Top Jazz Albums	Cont. Jazz Albums	BEL (Fla.)	FRA	NLD	NZL	NOR	SWE	SWI	Certifications (sales thresholds)
Modern Jazz Trumpets	Recorded: January 17, 1951; Released: 1951; Label: Prestige; Format: 10-inch LP	—	—	—	—	—	—	—	—	—	—	
Classics in Jazz: Miles Davis	Released: 1954; Label: Capitol; Format: LP	—	—	—	—	—	—	—	—	—	—	
Miles Davis Volume 1	Released: November 1955; Label: Blue Note; Format: LP	—	—	—	—	—	—	—	—	—	—	
Miles Davis Volume 2	Released: February 1956; Label: Blue Note; Format: LP	—	—	—	—	—	—	—	—	—	—	
Dig	Released: January, 1956; Recorded: October 5, 1951; Label: Prestige; Format: LP											
Conception	Recorded: October 5, 1951; Released: 1956; Label: Prestige; Format: LP	—	—	—	—	—	—	—	—	—	—	
Miles Davis and Horns	Released: 1956; Recorded: January 17, 1951 – February 19, 1953; Label: Prestige; Format: LP											
Blue Haze	Released: 1956; Recorded: May 19, 1953 – April 3, 1954; Label: Prestige; Format: LP											
Birth of the Cool	Released: 1957; Label: Capitol; Format: LP	—	—	—	—	—	—	—	—	—	—	UK: Silver
Walkin'	Released: 1957; Recorded: April 3, 1954; Label: Prestige; Format: LP											
Bags' Groove	Released: 1957; Recorded: June 29, 1954 – December 24, 1954; Label: Prestige; Format: LP											
Miles Davis and the Modern Jazz Giants	Released: 1959; Recorded: December 24, 1954; Label: Prestige; Format: LP											
Many Miles of Davis	Released: 1962; Label: Charlie Parker / Tucker; Format: LP, Reel Tape	—	—	—	—	—	—	—	—	—	—	
Play Richard Rodgers	Released: April 1963; Label: Moodsville; Format: LP											with John Coltrane
Miles Davis Plays for Lovers	Released: 1966; Label: Prestige; Format: LP	—	—	—	—	—	—	—	—	—	—	
Miles Davis' Greatest Hits	Released: 1969; Label: Columbia/Legacy; Format: LP	—	—	—	—	—	—	—	—	—	—	
Miles Ahead!	Released: 1970; Label: Prestige, PR 7822; Format: LP											
Tallest Trees	Released: 1972; Label: Prestige; Format: LP	—	—	—	—	—	—	—	—	—	—	
Collector's Items	Released: 1973; Label: Prestige, PR 24022; Format: 2×LP											compiles Collectors' Items and Blue Moods
Basic Miles: The Classic Performances of Miles Davis	Released: 1973; Label: Columbia; Format: LP	189	21	—	—	—	—	—	—	—	—	
Tune Up	Released: 1977; Label: Prestige Records; Format: LP, CD	—	—	—	—	—	—	—	—	—	—	
1958 Miles	Released: 1979; Label: CBS/Sony (Japan); Format: LP	—	—	—	—	—	—	—	—	—	—	reissued in US as '58 Sessions Featuring Stella by Starlight (1991) and Birth of the Blue (2024)
Circle in the Round	Released: 1979; Label: Columbia/Legacy; Format: LP	—	18	—	—	—	—	—	—	—	—	
Directions	Released: 1981; Label: Columbia/Legacy; Format: LP	179	9	—	—	—	—	—	—	—	—	
Mellow Miles	Released: 1985; Label: Sony; Format: LP, CD	—	—	—	—	—	—	—	—	—	—	ARIA: Gold
First Miles	Released: 1990; Label: Savoy Jazz; Format: LP, CD	—	—	—	—	—	—	—	—	—	—	
Plays Classic Ballads	Released: 1990; Label: CBS Special Products; Format: LP, CD	—	—	—	—	—	—	—	—	—	—	
'58 Sessions Featuring Stella by Starlight	Released: 1991; Label: Columbia/Legacy; Format: CD, CS											
The Ballad Artistry of Miles Davis	Released: 1992; Label: EMI; Format: LP, CD	—	—	—	—	—	—	—	—	—	—	
The Best of Miles Davis: The Capitol/Blue Note Years	Released: February 25, 1992; Label: Blue Note; Format: LP, CD	—	—	—	—	—	—	—	—	—	—	
Highlights from the Plugged Nickel	Released: November 21, 1995; Label: Sony; Format: LP, CD	—	9	—	—	—	—	—	—	—	—	
Ballads & Blues	Released: March 19, 1996; Label: Blue Note; Format: LP, CD	—	15	—	—	—	—	—	—	—	—	
This Is Jazz, Vol. 8: Miles Davis Acoustic	Released: April 30, 1996; Label: Sony; Format: LP, CD	—	19	—	—	—	—	—	—	—	—	
The Very Best Of Miles Davis	Released: 1996; Label: Sony; Format: CD	—	—	—	—	—	—	—	—	—	—	
Bluing: Miles Davis Plays the Blues	Released: December 3, 1996; Label: Prestige; Format: LP, CD	—	—	—	—	—	—	—	—	—	—	
The Best of Miles Davis & Gil Evans	Released: March 25, 1997; Label: Sony; Format: LP, CD	—	14	—	—	—	—	—	—	—	—	
This Is Jazz, Vol. 22: Miles Davis Plays Ballads	Released: May 5, 1997; Label: Sony; Format: LP, CD	—	16	—	—	—	—	—	—	—	—	
Panthalassa: The Music of Miles Davis 1969–1974	Released: February 16, 1998; Label: Sony; Format: LP, CD	—	4	—	—	—	—	—	—	—	—	
Love Songs	Released: February 2, 1999; Label: Sony; Format: LP, CD	—	1	—	—	—	—	—	—	—	—	
Panthalassa: The Remixes	Released: May 25, 1999; Label: Sony; Format: LP, CD	—	—	13	—	—	—	—	—	—	—	
Ken Burns Jazz	Released: November 7, 2000; Label: Columbia/Legacy; Format: LP, CD	—	11	—	—	—	—	—	—	—	—	
Ballads	Released: March 27, 2001; Label: Columbia; Format: LP, CD	—	—	—	—	—	—	—	—	—	—	
Super Hits	Released: April 17, 2001; Label: Columbia/Legacy; Format: LP, CD	—	9	—	—	—	—	—	—	—	—	
The Essential Miles Davis	Released: May 15, 2001; Label: Sony; Format: LP, CD	—	1	—	—	—	—	—	—	—	—	
Blue Moods: Music for You	Released: May 7, 2002; Label: Columbia/Legacy; Format: LP, CD	—	17	—	—	—	—	—	—	—	—	
Jazz Moods: Cool	Released: June 15, 2004; Label: Columbia/Legacy; Format: LP, CD	—	—	—	—	—	—	—	—	—	—	
The Best of Miles Davis	Released: August 31, 2004; Label: Prestige; Format: LP, CD	—	—	—	—	—	80	—	—	—	—	
Prestige Profiles, Vol. 1	Released: October 25, 2005; Label: Prestige; Format: LP, CD	—	25	—	—	—	—	—	—	—	—	
Cool & Collected	Released: September 5, 2006; Label: Columbia/Legacy; Format: LP, CD	—	8	—	—	89	—	17	—	—	—	
Evolution of the Groove	Released: August 21, 2007; Label: Sony; Format: LP, CD	—	—	—	—	—	—	—	—	—	—	
Forever Miles Davis	Released: September 18, 2007; Label: Madacy Special Markets; Format: LP, CD	—	20	—	—	—	—	—	—	—	—	
Beautiful Ballads & Love Songs	Released: January 15, 2008; Label: Legacy; Format: LP, CD	—	24	—	—	—	—	—	—	—	—	
Playlist	Released: April 29, 2008; Label: Playlist; Format: LP, CD	—	13	—	—	—	—	—	—	—	—	
Muted Miles	Released: June 10, 2008; Label: Prestige; Format: LP, CD	—	21	—	—	—	—	—	—	—	—	
Miles' Groove	Released: September 29, 2009; Label: Sony; Format: LP, CD	—	20	—	—	—	—	—	—	—	—	
Everything's Beautiful (with Robert Glasper)	Released: May 27, 2016; Label: Columbia/Legacy; Format: CD, digital download	152	1	—	44	125	85	—	—	—	50	
Miles '54: The Prestige Recordings	Released: August 13, 2024; Label: Craft Recordings; Format: 2×CD, 4×LP	—	—	—	—	—	—	—	—	—	—	
Miles '55: The Prestige Recordings	Released: August 22, 2025; Label: Craft Recordings; Format: 2×CD, 3×LP											
"—" denotes releases that did not chart or were not released.

=== Soundtracks ===
Title	Album details	Peak chart positions										Certifications (sales thresholds)
Title	Album details	US	Top Jazz Albums	Cont. Jazz Albums	BEL (Fla.)	FRA	NLD	NZL	NOR	SWE	SWI	Certifications (sales thresholds)
Ascenseur pour l'échafaud	Released: 1958; Label: Fontana; Format: LP	—	—	—	—	—	—	—	—	—	—	
Music from Siesta	Released: November 1987; Label: Warner Bros./WEA; Format: LP, CD	—	—	12	—	—	—	—	—	—	—	
The Hot Spot	Released: 1990; Label: Verve; Format: LP, CD	—	—	—	—	—	—	—	—	—	—	
Dingo	Released: November 5, 1991; Label: Warner Bros.; Format: LP, CD	—	5	—	—	—	—	—	—	—	—	
"—" denotes releases that did not chart or were not released.

=== Box sets ===
==== Compilation box sets ====
Title	Album details	Peak chart positions										Certifications (sales thresholds)
Title	Album details	US	Top Jazz Albums	Cont. Jazz Albums	BEL (Fla.)	FRA	NLD	NZL	NOR	SWE	SWI	Certifications (sales thresholds)
Chronicle: The Complete Prestige Recordings	Released: 1980 [12 LP box]; 1988 [8 CD Box]; Label: Prestige; Format: 12×LP, 8×CD	—	—	—	—	—	—	—	—	—	—	
The Miles Davis Collection, Vol. 1: 12 Sides of Miles	Released: 1981; Label: Columbia; Format: 6×LP	—	33	—	—	—	—	—	—	—	—	
The Columbia Years 1955–1985	Released: 1988; Label: Columbia; Format: LP, CD	—	9	—	—	—	—	—	—	—	—	
Great Sessions	Released: April 4, 2006; Label: Blue Note; Format: LP, CD	—	—	—	—	—	—	—	—	—	—	
The Legendary Prestige Quintet Sessions	Released: May 23, 2006; Label: Prestige; Format: LP, CD	—	15	—	—	—	—	—	—	—	—	
Bitches Brew 40th Anniversary Collector's Edition	Released: 2010; Label: Columbia; Format: LP, CD, DVD	—	—	—	—	—	—	—	—	—	—	
The Original Mono Recordings	Released: November 11, 2013; Label: Columbia; Format: CD	—	15	—	—	—	—	—	—	—	—	
"—" denotes releases that did not chart or were not released.

==== The Miles Davis Series ====
Title	Album details	Peak chart positions										Certifications (sales thresholds)
Title	Album details	US	Top Jazz Albums	Cont. Jazz Albums	BEL (Fla.)	FRA	NLD	NZL	NOR	SWE	SWI	Certifications (sales thresholds)
Miles Davis & Gil Evans: The Complete Columbia Studio Recordings	Released: 1996; Label: Columbia/Legacy; Mosaic Records; Format: LP, CD	—	3	—	—	—	—	—	—	—	—	
The Complete Studio Recordings of The Miles Davis Quintet 1965–1968	Released: March 24, 1998; Label: Columbia, Mosaic Records; Format: LP, CD	—	—	—	—	—	—	—	—	—	—	
The Complete Bitches Brew Sessions	Released: November 24, 1998; Label: Columbia/Legacy/Sony; Mosaic Records; Format: LP, CD	—	6	—	—	104	—	—	—	—	—	
The Complete Columbia Recordings of Miles Davis with John Coltrane	Released: 2000; Label: Columbia; Mosaic Records; Format: LP, CD	—	4	—	—	—	—	—	—	—	—	
The Complete In a Silent Way Sessions	Released: 2001; Label: Columbia; Mosaic Records; Format: LP, CD	—	6	—	147	—	—	—	—	—	—	
The Complete Jack Johnson Sessions	Released: September 30, 2003; Label: Columbia; Format: LP, CD	—	4	—	—	—	—	—	—	—	—	
Seven Steps: The Complete Columbia Recordings of Miles Davis 1963–1964	Released: 2004; Label: Columbia/Legacy; Format: LP, CD	—	15	—	—	—	—	—	—	—	—	
The Complete On the Corner Sessions	Released: October 2, 2007; Label: Columbia; Format: LP, CD	—	12	—	—	—	—	—	—	—	—	
"—" denotes releases that did not chart or were not released.

==== Limited edition box set ====
Title	Album details	Peak chart positions										Certifications (sales thresholds)
Title	Album details	US	Top Jazz Albums	Cont. Jazz Albums	BEL (Fla.)	FRA	NLD	NZL	NOR	SWE	SWI	Certifications (sales thresholds)
Miles Davis: The Complete Columbia Album Collection	Released: November 24, 2009; Label: Sony/Legacy; Format: LP, CD	—	—	—	—	—	—	—	—	—	—	
The Perfect Miles Davis Collection	Released: September 23, 2011; Label: Columbia; Format: LP, CD	—	—	—	—	—	—	—	—	—	—	
"—" denotes releases that did not chart or were not released.

==== Live box sets ====
Title	Album details	Peak chart positions										Certifications (sales thresholds)
Title	Album details	US	Top Jazz Albums	Cont. Jazz Albums	BEL (Fla.)	FRA	NLD	NZL	NOR	SWE	SWI	Certifications (sales thresholds)
The Complete Live at the Plugged Nickel 1965	Released: July 8, 1995; Label: Legacy; Mosaic Records; Format: LP, CD	—	10	—	—	—	—	—	—	—	—	
The Complete Miles Davis at Montreux	Released: October 1, 2002; Recorded: 1973–1991; Label: Columbia; Format: CD	—	19	—	—	—	—	—	—	—	—	
In Person Friday and Saturday Nights at the Blackhawk, Complete	Released: June 3, 2003; Label: Sony; Format: LP, CD	—	9	—	—	—	—	—	—	—	—	
The Cellar Door Sessions 1970	Released: December 27, 2005; Label: Columbia/Legacy; Format: LP, CD	—	16	—	—	187	—	—	—	—	—	
"—" denotes releases that did not chart or were not released.

==== The Bootleg Series box sets ====
Title	Album details	Peak chart positions										Certifications (sales thresholds)
Title	Album details	US	Top Jazz Albums	Cont. Jazz Albums	BEL (Fla.)	FRA	NLD	NZL	NOR	SWE	SWI	Certifications (sales thresholds)
Live in Europe 1967: The Bootleg Series Vol. 1	Released: September 20, 2011; Label: Sony/Legacy; Format: LP, CD, DVD	—	3	—	—	—	—	—	—	—	—	
Live in Europe 1969: The Bootleg Series Vol. 2	Released: January 29, 2013; Label: Sony/Legacy; Format: LP, CD, DVD	—	3	—	—	—	—	—	—	—	—	
Miles at the Fillmore - Miles Davis 1970: The Bootleg Series Vol. 3	Release Date: March 25, 2014; Label: Sony/Legacy; Format: LP, CD	—	3	—	—	—	—	—	—	—	—	
Miles Davis at Newport 1955-1975: The Bootleg Series Vol. 4	Release Date: July 17, 2015; Label: Sony/Legacy; Format: LP, CD, DL	—	2	—	—	—	—	—	—	—	—	
Miles Davis Quintet: Freedom Jazz Dance: The Bootleg Series, Vol. 5	Release Date: October 21, 2016; Label: Sony/Legacy; Format: LP, CD, DL	—	3	—	—	—	—	—	—	—	—	
Miles Davis & John Coltrane The Final Tour: The Bootleg Series, Vol. 6	Release Date: March 23, 2018; Label: Sony/Legacy; Format: LP, CD, DL	—	1	—	—	—	—	—	—	—	—	
That’s What Happened 1982-1985: The Bootleg Series, Vol. 7	Release Date: September 16, 2022; Label: Sony/Legacy; Format: LP, CD, DL	—	1	—	—	—	—	—	—	—	—	
Miles In France 1963 & 1964: The Bootleg Series, Vol. 8	Release Date September 12, 2024; Label: Sony/Legacy; Format: LP, CD, DL	—	2	—	—	—	—	—	—	—	—	
"—" denotes releases that did not chart or were not released.

== Singles ==
Year	A-side	B-side	Catalog number	Label	Footnotes
1946	"Milestones"	"Sippin' at Bell's"	934	Savoy	
1947	"Goin' to Minton's" (Fats Navarro Quintet)	"Half Nelson"	951	Savoy	
1947	"Chasing the Bird" (Charlie Parker's All Stars)	"Little Willie Leaps"	977	Savoy	
1948	"Little Willie Leaps"	"Half Nelson"	4507	Savoy	
1949	"Move"	"Budo"	15404	Capitol	
1949	"Jeru"	"Godchild"	57-60005	Capitol	
1949	"Boplicity"	"Israel"	57-60011	Capitol	
1950	"Venus Di Milo"	"Darn That Dream"	1221	Capitol	
1951	"Morpheus"	"Blue Room"	734	Prestige	
1951	"Whispering"	"Down"	742	Prestige	
1951	"My Old Flame, Part 1"	"My Old Flame, Part 2"	766	Prestige	
1951	"Dig, Part 1"	"Dig, Part 2"	777	Prestige	
1951	"It's Only a Paper Moon, Part 1"	"It's Only a Paper Moon, Part 2"	817	Prestige	
1951	"Bluing, Part 1"	"Bluing, Part 2"	846	Prestige	
1951	"Conception"	"Bluing, Part 3"	868	Prestige	
1951	"Out of the Blue, Part 1"	"Out of the Blue, Part 2"	876	Prestige	
1951	"Dig"	"It's Only a Paper Moon"	45-321	Prestige	
1952	"Dear Old Stockholm"	"Woody'n You"	1595	Blue Note	
1952	"Chance It"	"Yesterdays"	1596	Blue Note	
1952	"Donna"	"The Squirrel" [by Tadd Dameron]	1597	Blue Note	
1953	"Tempus Fugit"	"Enigma"	1618	Blue Note	
1953	"Ray's Idea"	"I Waited for You"	1619	Blue Note	
1953	"Kelo"	"C.T.A."	1620	Blue Note	
1953	"Tune Up"	"Smooch"	884	Prestige	
1953	"When Lights Are Low"	"Miles Ahead"	902	Prestige	
1953	"My Funny Valentine"	"Smooch"	45-353	Prestige	
1954	"Well You Needn't"	"Donna"	45-1633	Blue Note	
1954	"Lazy Susan"	"Tempus Fugit"	45-1649	Blue Note	
1954	"The Leap"	"Weirdo"	45-1650	Blue Note	
1954	"Blue Haze, Part 1"	"Blue Haze, Part 2"	893	Prestige	
1954	"Four"	"That Ole Devil Called Love"	898	Prestige	
1954	"But Not for Me, Part 1"	"But Not for Me, Part 2"	915	Prestige	
1954	"Walkin', Part 1"	"Walkin', Part 2"	45-157	Prestige	
1954	"You Don't Know What Love Is"	"That Old Devil Moon"	45-376	Prestige	
1955	"Green Haze, Part 1"	"Green Haze, Part 2"	45-103	Prestige	
1955	"A Night in Tunisia, Part 1"	"A Night in Tunisia, Part 2"	45-114	Prestige	
1955	"S'posin'"	"Just Squeeze Me"	45-268	Prestige	
1955	Blue Moods, Vol. 1: "Nature Boy"	"Alone Together"	27	Debut	
1955	Blue Moods, Vol. 2: "There's No You"	"Easy Living"	28	Debut	
1956	"If I Were a Bell, Part 1"	"If I Were a Bell, Part 2"	45-123	Prestige	
1956	"It Never Entered My Mind, Part 1"	"It Never Entered My Mind, Part 2"	45-165	Prestige	
1956	"When I Fall in Love"	"I Could Write a Book"	45-195	Prestige	
1956	"Surrey with the Fringe on Top"	"Diane"	45-248	Prestige	
1956	"Oleo"	"Tune Up"	45-395	Prestige	
1956	"Airegin"	"'Round Midnight"	45-413	Prestige	
1970	"Great Expectations" (edit)	"The Little Blue Frog"	45090	Columbia	
1970	"Miles Runs the Voodoo Down" (edit)	"Spanish Key" (edit)	45171	Columbia	
1971	"Saturday Miles" (edit)	"Friday Miles" (edit)	45327	Columbia	
1971	"Right Off (Part I)"	"Right Off (Part II)"	45350	Columbia	
1972	"Molester (Part I)"	"Molester (Part II)"	45709	Columbia	
1972	"Vote for Miles (Part I)"	"Vote for Miles (Part II)"	45822	Columbia	
1973	"Holly-Wuud"	"Big Fun"	45946	Columbia	
1974	"Go Ahead John" (edit)	"Great Expectations" (edit)	46074	Columbia	
1975	"Red China Blues"	"Maiysha" (edit)	10110	Columbia	

== Albums recorded as sideman ==
Year	Title	Artist(s)	Ref(s)
1945	Bird's Eyes, Vol. 13	Charlie Parker	
1945	Bird's Eyes, Vol. 14	Charlie Parker	
1945	Bird's Eyes, Vol. 18	Charlie Parker	
1945	The Love Songs of Mr. B	Billy Eckstine	
1945	The Charlie Parker Story	Charlie Parker	
1945	Yardbird in Lotus Land	Charlie Parker	
1946	The Young Rebel	Charles Mingus	
1946	Charlie Parker on Dial, Vol. 1	Charlie Parker	
1947	Encores	Charlie Parker	
1948	The Band That Never Was	Charlie Parker	
1950	Sarah Vaughan in Hi-Fi	Sarah Vaughan	
1951	Swedish Schnapps	Charlie Parker	
1951	The New Sounds	Lee Konitz	
1953	Sonny Rollins with the Modern Jazz Quartet	Sonny Rollins	
1955	Charlie Parker Memorial, Vol. 1	Charlie Parker	
1955	Charlie Parker Memorial, Vol. 2	Charlie Parker	
1955	I Surrender, Dear	Billy Eckstine	
1955	The Genius of Charlie Parker	Charlie Parker	
1956	What is Jazz	Leonard Bernstein	
1957	En Concerts	Rene Urtreger	
1957	Music For Brass: The 1957 Columbia Third Stream Recordings, Vol. 1	Brass Ensemble of the Jazz and Classical Music	
1958	Bird on 52nd Street	Charlie Parker	
1958	Somethin' Else	Cannonball Adderley	
1958	Legrand Jazz	Michel Legrand	
1962	The Bird Returns	Charlie Parker	
1962	A Date with Greatness	Coleman Hawkins, Howard McGhee and Lester Young	
1971	Bird in Paris	Charlie Parker	
1975	Nasty Gal	Betty Davis	
1986	Fahrenheit	Toto	
1987	Siesta	Marcus Miller	
1988	Bopping the Blues	Earl Coleman, Ann Baker	
1988	Machismo	Cameo	
1988	Provision	Scritti Politti	
1988	CK	Chaka Khan	
1988	Scrooged – Original Soundtrack	(various artists)	
1989	Back on the Block	Quincy Jones	
1989	Rara Avis	Charlie Parker	
1989	Stars of Modern Jazz at Carnegie Hall, Christmas 1949	(various artists)	
1989	Hollywood Stampede	Coleman Hawkins	
1989	Prisoner of Love	Kenny Garrett	
1990	The Hot Spot	(various artists)	
1990	Benny Carter And His Orchestra	Benny Carter	
1990	Bird: The Complete Charlie Parker on Verve	Charlie Parker	
1991	You Won't Forget Me	Shirley Horn	
1991	Bird's Eyes, Vol. 7	Charlie Parker	
1992	Flying Home	Illinois Jacquet	
1992	We the People Bop	Serge Chaloff	
1992	Capri	Paolo Rustichelli	
1993	The Sun Don't Lie	Marcus Miller	
1994	Mister B. And The Band	Billy Eckstine	
1994	Bird's Eyes, Vol. 12	Charlie Parker	
1995	Bird's Eyes, Vol. 19	Charlie Parker	
1995	Bird's Eyes, Vol. 20	Charlie Parker	
1995	Blue Bird	Charlie Parker	
1995	The Complete RCA Victor Recordings	Dizzy Gillespie	
1995	The Complete Blue Note and Capitol Recordings of Fats Navarro and Tadd Dameron	Fats Navarro and Tadd Dameron	
1996	In a Soulful Mood		
1996	Music Forever and Beyond: The Selected Works of Chick Corea	Chick Corea	
1996	Mystic Man	Paolo Rustichelli	
1998	Meets Miles Davis	Cannonball Adderley	
1999	Birth of Bop	Charlie Parker	
2000	Cool Bird	Charlie Parker	
2001	Complete 1945–1949 West Coast Recordings	Charles Mingus	
2002	Boss Bird	Charlie Parker	
2002	Louis Armstrong and His Friends	Louis Armstrong	
2003	The Complete Verve Master Takes	Charlie Parker	
2003	Complete Onyx Recordings	Charlie Parker	
2003	The Immortal Charlie Parker	Charlie Parker	
2004	Complete Dial Sessions	Charlie Parker	

== Videography ==
=== Video albums ===
Year	Title	Director	Footnotes
1986	Miles Ahead: The Music of Miles Davis	—	
1991	The Miles Davis Story	—	
1991	In Paris	—	
1993	Live at Montreux	—	
1995	Miles Ahead: Music of Miles Davis	—	
1998	Miles Davis & John Coltrane	—	
2000	Live from the Montreal Jazz Festival	—	
2001	Live in Paris	—	
2001	Miles Davis at La Villette	—	
2002	Live in Munich	—	
2004	Miles Electric: A Different Kind of Blue	—	
2004	The Cool Jazz Sound	—	
2004	Miles Davis: A Different Kind of Blue	Murray Lerner	
2004	Miles Davis – Live In Montreal 1985	—	
2005	Live in Vienna 1973	—	
2006	Live in Germany 1988	—	
2006	European Tour 1967	—	
2007	Milan 1964	—	
2008	Miles Davis: Live in Montreal	Tom O'Neill	
2008	Live in Poland 1983	—	
2008	At Hammersmith Odeon, London	—	
2008	Live in Copenhagen & Rome 1969	—	
2009	That's What Happened: Live in Germany 1987	—	
2010	1969 Berlin Concert	—	
2011	Live at Montreux: Highlights 1973–1991	—	
2011	Miles! The Definitive Miles Davis At Montreux DVD Collection	—	
2020	Birth of the Cool	—	
"—" denotes that no directors collaborated, or that no directors were found due to lack of sources.
