= Miles Davis: The Complete Columbia Album Collection =

The Complete Columbia Album Collection

Box set by Miles Davis
- Released: November 24, 2009
- Recorded: 1949–1989
- Genre: Jazz
- Length: 62 hours
- Label: Sony Legacy
- Producers: Daniel Baumgarten, Richard Seidet

Professional ratings
Review scores
| Source | Rating |
|---|---|
| AllMusic | 4/5 stars |

Miles Davis: The Complete Columbia Album Collection is a box set by jazz musician Miles Davis, released in 2009. It contains all the official releases on the Columbia Records label. The box set consists of 70 CDs and 1 DVD.

== Contents ==
The box set contains fifty-two albums on seventy CDs spanning Davis' career on Columbia Records from 1949 to 1989. All albums feature their original tracklists, while some use various deluxe reissue tracklists when available. A few albums received never-before-released bonus tracks. It also includes a never-before-released CD of the full Isle of Wight 1970 concert, a bonus DVD of the Miles Davis Quintet performing live in Europe in 1967. It also contains a 250-page book with annotations on every album and a biographical essay by magazine editor Frederic Goaty. Since this covers everything that Columbia owns, several albums from the early stages and the later stage of Davis' career are not included. This includes everything released by Prestige Records from 1951 to 1960, which is 12 10" records, and 9 full albums. Also missing is the short-lived Warner Bros. contract Miles had from 1986 to 1991, ending with his death. This includes the praised Tutu and Amandla, as well as 3 others. (One Warner Bros. album, Rubberband, was not released until about 10 years after this set came out.)

The albums were ordered in the box set by time of recording (as opposed to album release date); this order is reflected in the list below. All albums were newly remastered in 2009 for supreme sound quality.

| Disc # | Album # | Album | Year | Version |
|---|---|---|---|---|
| Disc 1 | No. 1 | In Paris Festival International de Jazz, May 1949 ^{a}^{e} | 1977 | Original 1977 Mono Mix |
| Disc 2 | No. 2 | 'Round About Midnight ^{f} | 1957 | Original 1957 Mono Mix |
| Disc 3 | No. 3 | Circle in the Round ^{c} | 1979 | Original 1979 Stereo Mix |
| Disc 4 | No. 3 | Circle in the Round ^{c} | 1979 | Original 1979 Stereo Mix |
| Disc 5 | No. 4 | Miles Ahead ^{f} | 1957 | 1996 True Stereo Mix |
| Disc 6 | No. 5 | Milestones ^{f} | 1958 | 2000 True Stereo Mix |
| Disc 7 | No. 6 | 1958 Miles ^{c}^{e} | 1974 | 2000 True Stereo Mix |
| Disc 8 | No. 7 | At Newport 1958 ^{a} | 1964 | 1994 True Stereo Mix |
| Disc 9 | No. 8 | Porgy and Bess ^{f} | 1959 | 1996 True Stereo Mix |
| Disc 10 | No. 9 | Jazz at the Plaza ^{a} | 1973 | 2000 True Stereo Mix |
| Disc 11 | No. 10 | Kind of Blue ^{f} | 1959 | 1997 Stereo Mix |
| Disc 12 | No. 11 | Sketches of Spain ^{f} | 1960 | 1996 Stereo Mix |
| Disc 13 | No. 12 | Directions ^{c} | 1981 | Original 1981 Stereo Mix |
| Disc 14 | No. 12 | Directions ^{c} | 1981 | Original 1981 Stereo Mix |
| Disc 15 | No. 13 | Someday My Prince Will Come ^{f} | 1961 | 1999 Stereo Mix |
| Disc 16 | No. 14 | In Person Friday Night at the Blackhawk ^{a}^{f} | 1961 | 2003 Stereo Mix |
| Disc 17 | No. 14 | In Person Friday Night at the Blackhawk ^{a}^{f} | 1961 | 2003 Stereo Mix |
| Disc 18 | No. 15 | In Person Saturday Night at the Blackhawk ^{a}^{f} | 1961 | 2003 Stereo Mix |
| Disc 19 | No. 15 | In Person Saturday Night at the Blackhawk ^{a}^{f} | 1961 | 2003 Stereo Mix |
| Disc 20 | No. 16 | Carnegie Hall ^{a}^{f} | 1962 | 1998 Mono Mix |
| Disc 21 | No. 16 | Carnegie Hall ^{a}^{f} | 1962 | 1998 Mono Mix |
| Disc 22 | No. 17 | Quiet Nights ^{e} | 1963 | 2009 Stereo Mix |
| Disc 23 | No. 18 | Seven Steps to Heaven ^{f} | 1963 | 2004 Stereo Mix |
| Disc 24 | No. 19 | In Europe ^{a}^{f} | 1964 | 2005 Mono Mix |
| Disc 25 | No. 20 | My Funny Valentine ^{a} | 1965 | 2004 Stereo Mix |
| Disc 26 | No. 21 | 'Four' and More ^{a}^{f} | 1966 | 2004 Stereo Mix |
| Disc 27 | No. 22 | Miles in Tokyo ^{a}^{f} | 1969 | Original 1969 Stereo Mix |
| Disc 28 | No. 23 | Miles in Berlin ^{a}^{f} | 1965 | 2004 Mono Mix |
| Disc 29 | No. 24 | E.S.P. | 1965 | 1998 Stereo Mix |
| Disc 30 | No. 25 | Plugged Nickel, Vol. 1 and 2 ^{a}^{e} | 1976 | 1995 Stereo Mix |
| Disc 31 | No. 25 | Plugged Nickel, Vol. 1 and 2 ^{a}^{e} | 1976 | 1995 Stereo Mix |
| Disc 32 | No. 26 | Miles Smiles | 1967 | 1998 Stereo Mix |
| Disc 33 | No. 27 | Sorcerer ^{f} | 1967 | 1998 Stereo Mix |
| Disc 34 | No. 28 | Nefertiti ^{f} | 1968 | 1998 Stereo Mix |
| Disc 35 | No. 29 | Water Babies ^{f} | 1976 | 1998 Stereo Mix |
| Disc 36 | No. 30 | Miles in the Sky ^{f} | 1968 | 1998 Stereo Mix / 1993 Stereo Mix |
| Disc 37 | No. 31 | Filles de Kilimanjaro ^{f} | 1968 | Original 1968 Stereo Mix |
| Disc 38 | No. 32 | In a Silent Way | 1969 | Original 1969 Stereo Mix |
| Disc 39 | No. 33 | Bitches Brew ^{f} | 1970 | Original 1970 Stereo Mix |
| Disc 40 | No. 33 | Bitches Brew ^{f} | 1970 | Original 1970 Stereo Mix |
| Disc 41 | No. 34 | Big Fun ^{c}^{f} | 1974 | Original 1974 Stereo Mix |
| Disc 42 | No. 34 | Big Fun ^{c}^{f} | 1974 | Original 1974 Stereo Mix |
| Disc 43 | No. 35 | Jack Johnson | 1971 | 2005 Stereo Mix |
| Disc 44 | No. 36 | Live at the Fillmore East: It's About That Time ^{a} | 2001 | Original 2001 Stereo Mix |
| Disc 45 | No. 36 | Live at the Fillmore East: It's About That Time ^{a} | 2001 | Original 2001 Stereo Mix |
| Disc 46 | No. 37 | Black Beauty ^{a} | 1973 | Original 1973 Stereo Mix |
| Disc 47 | No. 37 | Black Beauty ^{a} | 1973 | Original 1973 Stereo Mix |
| Disc 48 | No. 38 | At Fillmore ^{a} | 1970 | Original 1970 Stereo Mix |
| Disc 49 | No. 38 | At Fillmore ^{a} | 1970 | Original 1970 Stereo Mix |
| Disc 50 | No. 39 | Isle of Wight ^{a}^{d} | 2009 | Original 2009 Stereo Mix |
| Disc 51 | No. 40 | Live-Evil ^{b}^{f} | 1971 | Original 1971 Stereo Mix |
| Disc 52 | No. 40 | Live-Evil ^{b}^{f} | 1971 | Original 1971 Stereo Mix |
| Disc 53 | No. 41 | On the Corner | 1972 | Original 1972 Stereo Mix |
| Disc 54 | No. 42 | In Concert ^{a} | 1973 | Original 1973 Stereo Mix |
| Disc 55 | No. 42 | In Concert ^{a} | 1973 | Original 1973 Stereo Mix |
| Disc 56 | No. 43 | Dark Magus ^{a} | 1977 | Original 1977 Stereo Mix |
| Disc 57 | No. 43 | Dark Magus ^{a} | 1977 | Original 1977 Stereo Mix |
| Disc 58 | No. 44 | Get Up with It ^{c} | 1974 | Original 1974 Stereo Mix |
| Disc 59 | No. 44 | Get Up with It ^{c} | 1974 | Original 1974 Stereo Mix |
| Disc 60 | No. 45 | Agharta ^{a} | 1975 | Original 1975 Stereo Mix |
| Disc 61 | No. 45 | Agharta ^{a} | 1975 | Original 1975 Stereo Mix |
| Disc 62 | No. 46 | Pangaea ^{a} | 1976 | Original 1976 Stereo Mix |
| Disc 63 | No. 46 | Pangaea ^{a} | 1976 | Original 1976 Stereo Mix |
| Disc 64 | No. 47 | The Man with the Horn | 1981 | Original 1981 Stereo Mix |
| Disc 65 | No. 48 | We Want Miles ^{a}^{e} | 1982 | Original 1982 Stereo Mix |
| Disc 66 | No. 48 | We Want Miles ^{a}^{e} | 1982 | Original 1982 Stereo Mix |
| Disc 67 | No. 49 | Star People | 1983 | Original 1983 Stereo Mix |
| Disc 68 | No. 50 | Decoy | 1984 | Original 1984 Stereo Mix |
| Disc 69 | No. 51 | You're Under Arrest | 1985 | Original 1985 Stereo Mix |
| Disc 70 | No. 52 | Aura ^{f} | 1989 | Original 1989 Stereo Mix |
| DVD | No. 53 | Live at Europe 1967 | 2009 | Original 2009 DVD Stereo Mix |

^a This album is a live recording.

^b This album is partially a live recording.

^c This album is a compilation album.

^d This album is exclusive to the box set and was never released before.

^e This album has been expanded exclusively for this box set.

^f This album includes bonus tracks included on previous reissues.

== Bonus tracks and expansions ==
- In Paris Festival International de Jazz, May 1949 is released for the first time on CD outside of Japan and includes two never-released bonus tracks, "The Squirrel" and "Lover Man".
- 'Round About Midnight features the bonus tracks included on the 2001 reissue ("Little Melonae", "Budo", "Sweet Sue, Just You"), and also including the first alternate take of "Two Bass Hit", at around 7:00, not released anywhere else.
- Circle in the Round is unchanged.
- Miles Ahead features 4 previously released alternate takes: "Springsville", "Miles Ahead" (labelled at "Blues for Pablo"), "The Meaning of the Blues / Lament", and "I Don't Wanna Be Kissed (by Anyone but You)".
- Milestones features 3 previously released alternate takes: a second "Two Bass Hit", "Milestones" and "Straight, No Chaser".
- 1958 Miles features 1 previously released alternate take: "Fran-Dance". However, it does not include the 1958 show at The Plaza Hotel on the original release.
- At Newport 1958 is unchanged.
- Porgy and Bess featured 2 previously released alternate takes: "I Loves You, Porgy" and "Gone".
- Jazz at the Plaza is unchanged.
- Kind of Blue features 1 previously released alternate take: "Flamenco Sketches".
- Sketches of Spain features 2 previously released alternate takes: "Concierto de Aranjuez" (Part 1) and "Concierto de Aranjuez" (Part 2).
- Directions is unchanged.
- Someday My Prince Will Come features 1 previously released alternate take: "Someday My Prince Will Come".
- Friday Night and Saturday Night at the Blackhawk both contain the full Blackhawk shows, previously released.
- At Carnegie Hall contains the full Carnegie Hall, previously released.
- Quiet Nights features two unreleased tracks: "Blue Xmas (To Whom It May Concern)", and "Devil May Care".
- Seven Steps to Heaven features 1 previously released alternate take: "So Near, So Far" and 1 previously released outtake: "Summer Night".
- In Europe features 1 previously released track not on the original LP: "I Thought About You".
- My Funny Valentine is unchanged.
- 'Four' and More separates the announcements and versions of "The Theme" with the rest of the tune it's attached to.
- Miles in Tokyo is unchanged.
- Miles in Berlin features 1 previously released track not on the original LP: "Stella by Starlight".
- E.S.P. is unchanged.
- At Plugged Nickel, Chicago features the original track listing of the LP but the unedited versions of the songs included, unlike any other reissue.
- Miles Smiles is unchanged.
- Sorcerer features 2 previously released alternate takes: "Masqualero" and "Limbo".
- Nefertiti features 4 previously released alternate takes: 2 of "Hand Jive", and 1 of "Madness" and "Pinocchio"
- Water Babies features 1 previously released outtake: "Splash".
- Miles in the Sky features 2 previously released alternate takes: "Black Comedy" and "Country Sun".
- Filles de Kilimanjaro features 1 previously released alternate take: "Tout De Suite".
- In a Silent Way is unchanged.
- Bitches Brew features 1 previously released outtake: "Feio".
- Big Fun features the more complete reissue version as opposed to the original LP version.
- Jack Johnson is unchanged.
- The last track on "Pangaea" is increased to almost 50 minutes as compared to 46 minutes on the original version.
- "Agharta" is unchanged.

== Production ==
- Box Set Producer - Daniel Baumgarten and Richard Seidet
- Boxset Supervision/A&R - Steve Berkowitz
- Mastering Engineer - Mark Wilder and Maria at Battery Studio, NYC
- Mastering coordination - Donna Kloepfer
- Project Direction - Adam Farber and Zak Profera
- Archival Research - Michael Panico and Tom Tierney
- Tape Research - Matt Kelly
- Art Direction and Design - Bruno Lefèvre, Christophe Javault and Juliette Carrico / Objectif Lune [Paris]
- English translation - Michelle Sommers and Diane Cousineau
- Editorial Supervision [English translation] - Jeremy Holiday and Sheri Miller
