= The Complete Columbia Album Collection =

The Complete Columbia Album Collection may refer to:

- Johnny Cash: The Complete Columbia Album Collection
- Miles Davis: The Complete Columbia Album Collection
- Blue Öyster Cult: The Complete Columbia Album Collection
