= Live at the Plugged Nickel =

At Plugged Nickel, Chicago

Live album by Miles Davis
- Released: 1976 (Japan); 1982 (Worldwide)
- Recorded: December 22–23, 1965
- Venue: Plugged Nickel; Chicago
- Genre: Post-bop, hard bop, modal jazz
- Length: 100:58
- Label: CBS/Sony; Columbia
- Producer: Teo Macero

Miles Davis chronology
Agharta (1975)	At Plugged Nickel, Chicago (1976)	Pangaea (1976)

Miles Davis live chronology
Miles in Berlin (1964)	Live at the Plugged Nickel (1965)	Live in Europe 1967: The Bootleg Series Vol. 1 (1967)

Live at the Plugged Nickel

Live at the Plugged Nickel is a live double album by Miles Davis, originally released separately as At Plugged Nickel, Chicago, Vol. 1 and At Plugged Nickel, Chicago, Vol. 2 on CBS/Sony in Japan in 1976, recorded in 1965 on December 22 and 23 respectively and released worldwide through Columbia in 1982 as part of the Contemporary Masters Series. The volumes also appear At Plugged Nickel, Chicago (Album No. 25 / Discs 30 & 31) in the box set Miles Davis: The Complete Columbia Album Collection.

Columbia recorded the seven sets the quintet performed over the two nights, but although some tracks were made available on compilations, the full recordings were not released until the appearance of the Complete Live at the Plugged Nickel 1965 in 1995.

== Reception ==
Pianist Jodie Christian, one of the founders of the AACM, was in the audience, and recalled: "Technically, they listened to one another and played together unlike any other band I'd ever heard... Everybody heard each other and was able to respond to the same thing. At intermission everybody in the audience would talk excitedly about what we were hearing, because they were playing both free-form and conventional. I don't think I ever heard anything like that again." Trumpeter Dave Douglas expressed his admiration for Shorter's solo on "On Green Dolphin Street", writing: "it's the counterintuitive choices Shorter makes in this solo that really get me. By counterintuitive I mean: Shorter seems to use the unusual notes in a chord or voice-leading moment to connote other harmonic areas, keys and scales, and somehow always manages to resolve the dissonance tunefully but almost never in the way you expect. It helps that his dialogue with the rest of the band is telepathic, with each interesting harmonic, melodic and rhythmic choice leading to an intelligent and emotive response. The deeper you listen, the more profound those choices seem. That makes a great improvisation, no matter the music or style."

When the 1982 Plugged Nickel recording came out, Wynton Marsalis visited Shorter at his home and asked if they could listen to the music together while Marsalis watched Shorter's facial expressions.

== Track listing ==
=== At Plugged Nickel, Chicago, Vol. 1 ===
No.	Title	Writer(s)	Length
1.	"Walkin'"	Richard Carpenter	11:03
2.	"Agitation"	Miles Davis	10:50
3.	"On Green Dolphin Street"	Ned Washington, Bronisław Kaper	11:14
4.	"So What"	Miles Davis	13:38
5.	"The Theme"	Miles Davis	0:17

=== At Plugged Nickel, Chicago, Vol. 2 ===
No.	Title	Writer(s)	Length
1.	"'Round Midnight"	Bernie Hanighen, Cootie Williams, Thelonious Monk	8:40
2.	"Stella by Starlight"	Ned Washington, Victor Young	13:16
3.	"All Blues"	Miles Davis	12:00
4.	"Yesterdays/The Theme"	Jerome Kern, Otto Harbach/Miles Davis	20:00

== Personnel ==
=== The Miles Davis Quintet ===
- Miles Davis – trumpet
- Wayne Shorter – tenor saxophone
- Herbie Hancock – piano
- Ron Carter – double bass
- Tony Williams – drums
