= Dark Magus =

Live album by Miles Davis
- Released: 1977
- Recorded: March 30, 1974
- Venues: Carnegie Hall, New York City
- Genres: Jazz fusion; jazz-funk; avant-garde jazz
- Length: 100:58
- Label: CBS/Sony
- Producer: Teo Macero

Miles Davis chronology
Water Babies (1976)	Dark Magus (1977)	Circle in the Round (1979)

Miles Davis live chronology
The Complete Miles Davis at Montreux (1973)	Dark Magus (1974)	Agharta (1975)

Dark Magus is a live double album by the American jazz trumpeter, composer, and bandleader Miles Davis. It was recorded on March 30, 1974, at Carnegie Hall in New York City, during the electric period in Davis' career. His group at the time included bassist Michael Henderson, drummer Al Foster, percussionist Mtume, saxophonist Dave Liebman, and guitarists Pete Cosey and Reggie Lucas; Davis used the performance to audition saxophonist Azar Lawrence and guitarist Dominique Gaumont. Dark Magus was produced by Teo Macero and featured four two-part recordings, titled with the Swahili numerals for numbers one through four.

Dark Magus was released after Davis' 1975 retirement, upon which Columbia Records issued a series of albums of his live music and studio outtakes. After releasing the Agharta (1975) live recording in the United States, Columbia released the live Pangaea (1976) and Dark Magus (1977) albums only in Japan, through CBS/Sony. The label's A&R executive, Tatsu Nosaki, suggested the album's title, which refers to the Magus from Zoroastrianism.

Despite an ambivalent reception by contemporary music critics, Dark Magus inspired noise rock acts of the late 1970s and experimental funk artists of the 1980s. In retrospective reviews, critics praised its jazz-rock musical aesthetic and the group members' performances, and some believed certain elements foreshadowed jungle music. The album was not released in the United States until its July 1997 reissue by Columbia/Legacy.

== Background ==
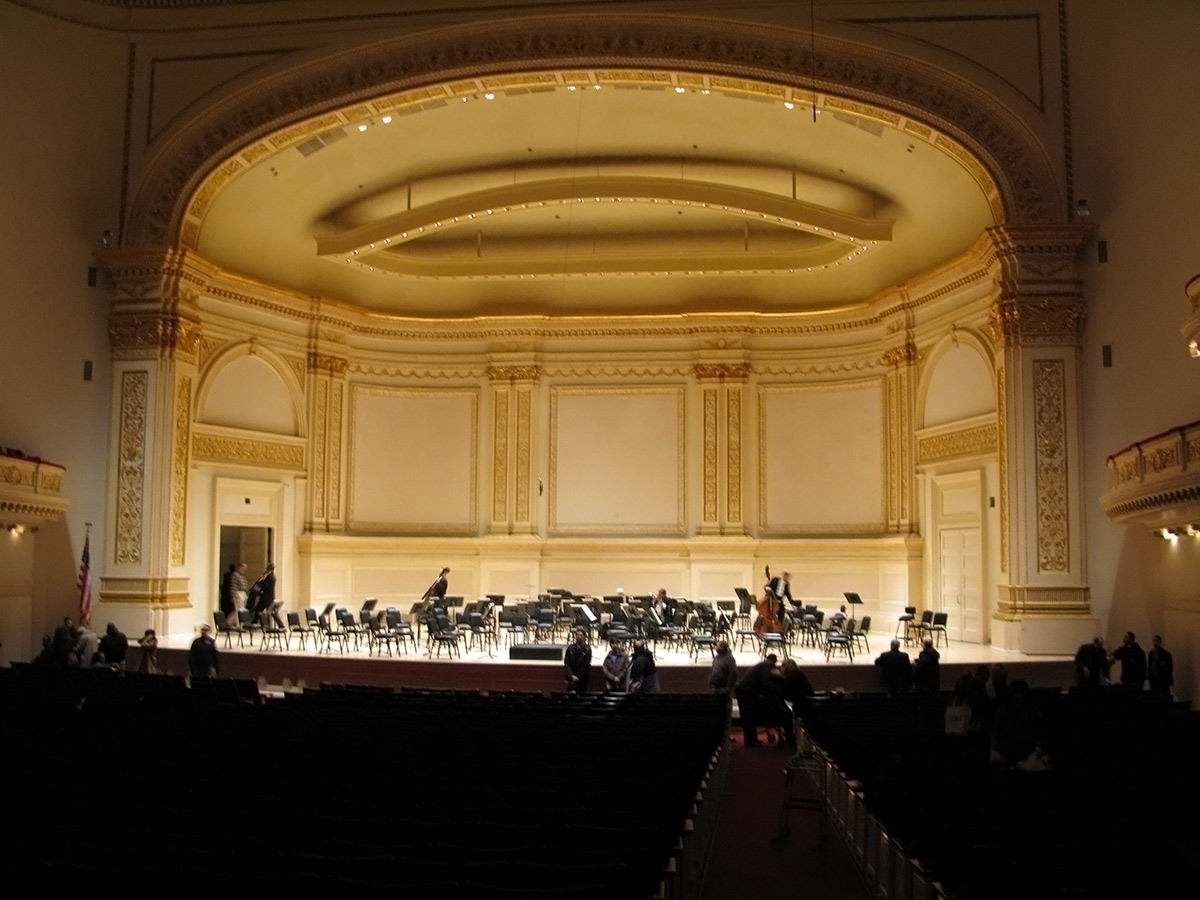
The main hall stage of Carnegie Hall

Miles Davis was 47 years old when he was asked to play Carnegie Hall in 1974, which followed four years of relentless touring. He had played the venue numerous times before and recorded a live album there in 1961. By 1974, Davis had been dealing with several severe mental and physical health problems, including depression, cocaine and sex addictions, osteoarthritis, bursitis, and sickle-cell anemia. He had also lost respect with both critics and his contemporaries because of his musical explorations into more rock- and funk-oriented sounds. Influenced by Karlheinz Stockhausen, Davis wanted to avoid individual songs and instead record extended movements that developed into a different composition. He played his trumpet sparsely and became less of the focal point for his band, whom he allowed more freedom to improvise and with whom he rarely rehearsed, so that the young musicians he enlisted would be tested to learn and play together onstage.

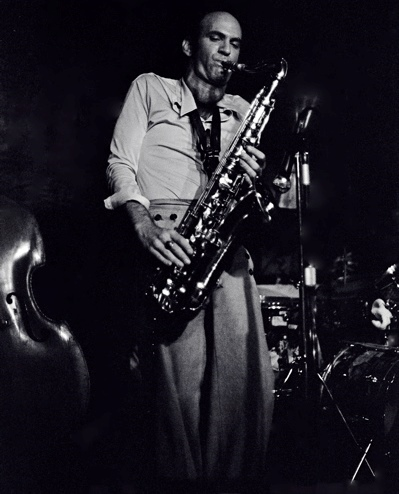
Dave Liebman (pictured in 1975)

The March 30, 1974, concert featured an ethnically and age-diverse audience that included young hippies and old, wealthy attendees. According to Magnet magazine's Bryan Bierman, "the hip, 'with it' kids [sat] side-by-side with middle-aged tuxedoed couples, expecting to hear 'My Funny Valentine.'" Although he lived only 15 minutes away, Davis arrived at the venue more than an hour late. When the band walked out onstage, he followed with his back turned to the audience, casually strolling onstage while the other musicians were setting up. Davis immediately began to play, and the band responded by playing a dense rhythm in unison. Saxophonist Dave Liebman, writing in the 1997 US reissue liner notes for Dark Magus, recalled the start of the show: "It is his whim .. That's the thing! ... Miles can do that and have three thousand musicians follow him. Right? So what I learned in that respect from Miles was to be able to watch him and be on his case."

Somehow, he would get you to play in a manner that in most cases you would never do again.

— Liebman on Davis

Davis used the show to audition two new members—tenor saxophonist Azar Lawrence and guitarist Dominique Gaumont. Lawrence was a highly regarded young saxophonist at the time, while Gaumont was enlisted by Davis in response to incumbent guitarist Reggie Lucas's demand for a pay raise. Although it was unexpected, Liebman later characterized the move as typical Davis: "What he was doing—which he often does at big kinda gigs like that—is change the shit up, by doing something totally out. Totally unexpected. I mean, we had been a band together on the road for a year ... And then, suddenly, a live date, New York City, Carnegie Hall, the cat pulls two cats who never even saw each other. I mean, you gotta say, 'Is the man mad or is he – he's either mad or extremely subtle."

== Composition and performance ==
[Davis] shifted gears at will in his early-'70s music, orchestrating moods and settings to subjugate the individual musical inspirations of his young close-enough-for-funk subgeniuses to the life of a single palpitating organism that would have perished without them—no arrangements, little composition, and not many solos either, although at any moment a player could find himself left to fly off on his own.

— Robert Christgau

Dark Magus features four two-part compositions with an average length of 25 minutes each. The album's music was unrehearsed and eschewed melody for improvisations around funk rhythms and grooves. The rhythms, colors, and keys "would shift and change on a whim from Davis", as AllMusic's Thom Jurek said. Davis eschewed his previous performances' keyboardists in favor of a three-guitar lineup of Reggie Lucas, Dominique Gaumont, and Pete Cosey, who had a penchant for guitar wails and pedal effects. Davis often stopped the band with hand signals and created longer empty spaces than traditional jazz breaks, encouraging the soloists to fill them with exaggerated cadenzas.

Throughout the work, Davis soloed only intermittently or played his Yamaha organ. He played trumpet on "Moja" and both trumpet and organ on the other pieces. The second half of "Moja" is distinguished by a long ballad sequence introduced by Liebman and continued by Lucas and Davis. "Moja" also included a theme from "Nne." On "Tatu", Gaumont followed Lucas's solo with a long passage characterized by fuzzy wah-wah effects, and Lawrence played briefly with Liebman in a duet before his own disjointed solo. "Tatu" ended with a rendition of "Calypso Frelimo." During the first part of "Nne", they played the Davis-penned composition "Ife." Near the end of "Nne", Davis played a short blues.

According to Robert Christgau, the aesthetic on Dark Magus was a culmination of Davis' previous records and "bifurcated, like jazz-rock again." He argued that Davis left the two elements—jazz and rock—"distinct and recognizable", whereas "pure funk" would have subsumed them both "in a new conception, albeit one that" favors rock. Christgau attributed the album's jazz input to Lawrence's "Coltranesque" saxophone, and the rock elements to guitarists Lucas and Gaumont, who "wah-riff[ed] the rhythm", and Pete Cosey, who produced "his own wah-wah-inflected noise into the arena-rock stratosphere." Erik Davis compared Davis' trumpet sound to "a mournful but pissed-off banshee", and Cosey, Lucas, and Gaumont to "somewhere between and beyond James Brown and Can", amid "quiet percussion passages [that] emerge like moonlit clearings." In The Rough Guide to Rock (2003), Ben Smith described the music as "an amazingly dense amalgam of free jazz and funk", while Fred Kaplan from New York magazine called it "electric jazz-rock fusion."

== Release ==
Dark Magus was released after Davis' retirement, when Columbia Records issued several albums of various Davis outtakes. They released his live album Agharta (1975) in the US, though not Pangaea (1976), and ultimately did not approve of his other live recordings, choosing to issue Dark Magus only in Japan. It was released in 1977 by CBS/Sony, who used several engineering fades in the album's production to shorten the original concert for the final release. The album's four tracks were titled after Swahili numerals for numbers one through four. Its title was suggested by Tatsu Nosaki, an A&R executive from CBS/Sony, who were producing the album. According to Nosaki, "Magus ... is the founder of the ancient Persian religion, Zoroastrianism." The cover image is, as The New York Public Library blogger Shawn Donohue describes, "an enigma" as "it is hard to make out anything more than shapes and colors, possibly Davis in tripped out profile on the far right."

The album was not released in the United States until July 1997, when it was reissued by Sony Records and Legacy Records. It was part of the labels' reissue of five two-disc live albums by Davis, including Black Beauty: Miles Davis at Fillmore West (1970), Miles Davis at Fillmore (1970), Live-Evil (1971), and In Concert (1973). The reissued albums featured liner notes written by his sidemen.

== Reception and legacy ==
Retrospective professional reviews
Review scores
Source	Rating
AllMusic	4/5 stars
Christgau's Consumer Guide	A
Down Beat	4/5 stars
Encyclopedia of Popular Music	4/5 stars
Entertainment Weekly	A
Los Angeles Times	2/4 stars
MusicHound Jazz	3.5/5
The Penguin Guide to Jazz	3.5/4 stars
Pitchfork	9.5/10
The Rolling Stone Album Guide	3.5/5 stars

Dark Magus was received ambivalently by contemporary critics but became an inspiration to late-1970s noise rock acts and the experimental funk artists of the 1980s. Its 1997 reissue was ranked by Christgau as the 10th-best album of the year in his list for The Village Voice's annual Pazz & Jop critics' poll. In 2001, Q named it one of the "50 Heaviest Albums of All Time" and called it "a maelstrom of uncut improvisational fury ... arguably the furthest out Miles ever got." David Keenan placed it on his all-time 105 best albums list for the Sunday Herald and said by ornamenting heavy grooves with tribal percussive instruments, wah-wah effects, and otherworldly trumpet bursts, Davis had instinctively fused the most advanced elements of modern African-American music. According to CODA critic Greg Masters, Davis created among the darkest and most radical auras, feelings, and moods in 20th-century music on Dark Magus.

Reviewing the reissue in 1997 for JazzTimes, Tom Terrell said this kind of music would never be heard again, deeming it "tomorrow's sound yesterday ... a terrifyingly exhilarating aural asylum of wails, howls, clanks, chanks, telltale heartbeats, wah wah quacks, white noise and loud silences." According to DownBeat that year, the frantic burbles of congas on "Moja" and "Tatu" predated oldschool jungle by 20 years, while Spin journalist Erik Davis found its anguished, ferocious music extremely impressive, especially when listened to loud. He contended that the group improvisation on tracks such as "Wili" foreshadowed the drum 'n' bass genre: "Miles was invoking the primordial powers of the electronic urban jungle." In The Penguin Guide to Jazz (1998), Richard Cook and Brian Morton wrote that each performance comprises only "shadings and sanations of sound, and as one gets to know these recordings better one becomes almost fixated on the tiniest inflexions." Pitchfork critic Jason Josephes regarded it as a highly valued Davis record that invokes a sense of coolness in listeners.

Just when you think the shit can't get much higher, Miles comes in and hits the wah-wah down hard on the horn and the next thing you know, you're slappin' five to the man upstairs ... By the rite of Dark Magus, I can fake the cool in no time flat.

— Jason Josephes, Pitchfork

In The Rolling Stone Album Guide (2004), J. D. Considine wrote that Dark Magus expressed the band's surging rhythms better than In Concert and offered a balance between their affinity for improvisation amidst their desire to rock. Jeff McCord of The Austin Chronicle found the performances impassioned, enduring, and highlighted by effectively competitive playing between each duo of saxophonists and guitarists. According to John Szwed, it has moments when all three guitarists and two saxophonists are "in dense and exalted free improvisation together, and Pete Cosey's tunings, effects, excess, and sheer inventiveness took the guitar to the point where Hendrix, free jazz, and rhythm and blues proudly merged together." By contrast, Don Heckman of the Los Angeles Times found the funk rhythms repetitive and Davis' playing both limited and unexceptional. AllMusic's Thom Jurek called it an exaggerated and excessive showcase of Davis' disoriented psyche and felt that, although the rhythm section is historically captivating, the other musicians' playing is inconsistent, albeit enthraling.

== Track listing ==
All compositions were credited to Miles Davis.

=== Original release ===
Side one
No.	Title	Length
1.	"Dark Magus – Moja"	25:24

Side two
No.	Title	Length
1.	"Dark Magus – Wili"	25:08

Side three
No.	Title	Length
1.	"Dark Magus – Tatu"	25:20

Side four
No.	Title	Length
1.	"Dark Magus – Nne"	25:32
Total length:		1:41:24

=== 1997 CD reissue ===
Disc one: First set
No.	Title	Length
1.	"Moja (Part 1)"	12:28
2.	"Moja (Part 2)"	12:40
3.	"Wili (Part 1)"	14:20
4.	"Wili (Part 2)"	10:44

Disc two: Second set
No.	Title	Length
1.	"Tatu (Part 1)"	18:47
2.	"Tatu (Part 2) ('Calypso Frelimo')"	6:29
3.	"Nne (Part 1) ('Ife')"	15:19
4.	"Nne (Part 2)"	10:11

== Personnel ==
- Miles Davis – electric trumpet with wah-wah, Yamaha organ (on "Wili", "Tatu", and "Nne")
- Dave Liebman – flute, soprano saxophone, tenor saxophone
- Azar Lawrence – tenor saxophone (on "Tatu" and "Nne")
- Reggie Lucas – electric guitar
- Pete Cosey – electric guitar, percussion
- Dominique Gaumont – electric guitar (on "Tatu" and "Nne")
- Michael Henderson – electric bass
- Al Foster – drums
- James Mtume – percussion

== Bibliography ==
- Chambers, Jack (1998). Milestones: The Music and Times of Miles Davis. Vol. 1–2. Da Capo Press. ISBN 0-306-80849-8.
- Christgau, Robert (2000). Christgau's Consumer Guide: Albums of the '90s. Macmillan. ISBN 0-312-24560-2.
- Considine, J. D.; et al. (November 2, 2004). Brackett, Nathan; Hoard, Christian (eds.). The New Rolling Stone Album Guide: Completely Revised and Updated 4th Edition. Simon & Schuster. ISBN 0-7432-0169-8.
- Cook, Richard; Morton, Brian (1998). The Penguin Guide to Jazz (4th ed.). Penguin Books. ISBN 0-14-051383-3.
- Larkin, Colin, ed. (2006). The Encyclopedia of Popular Music (4th ed.). Muze. ISBN 0-19-531373-9.
- Szwed, John (2004). So What: The Life of Miles Davis. Simon & Schuster. ISBN 0-684-85983-1.
