= Festival Hall, Osaka =

Concert hall in Osaka, Japan

Coordinates: 34.693577°N 135.496396°E

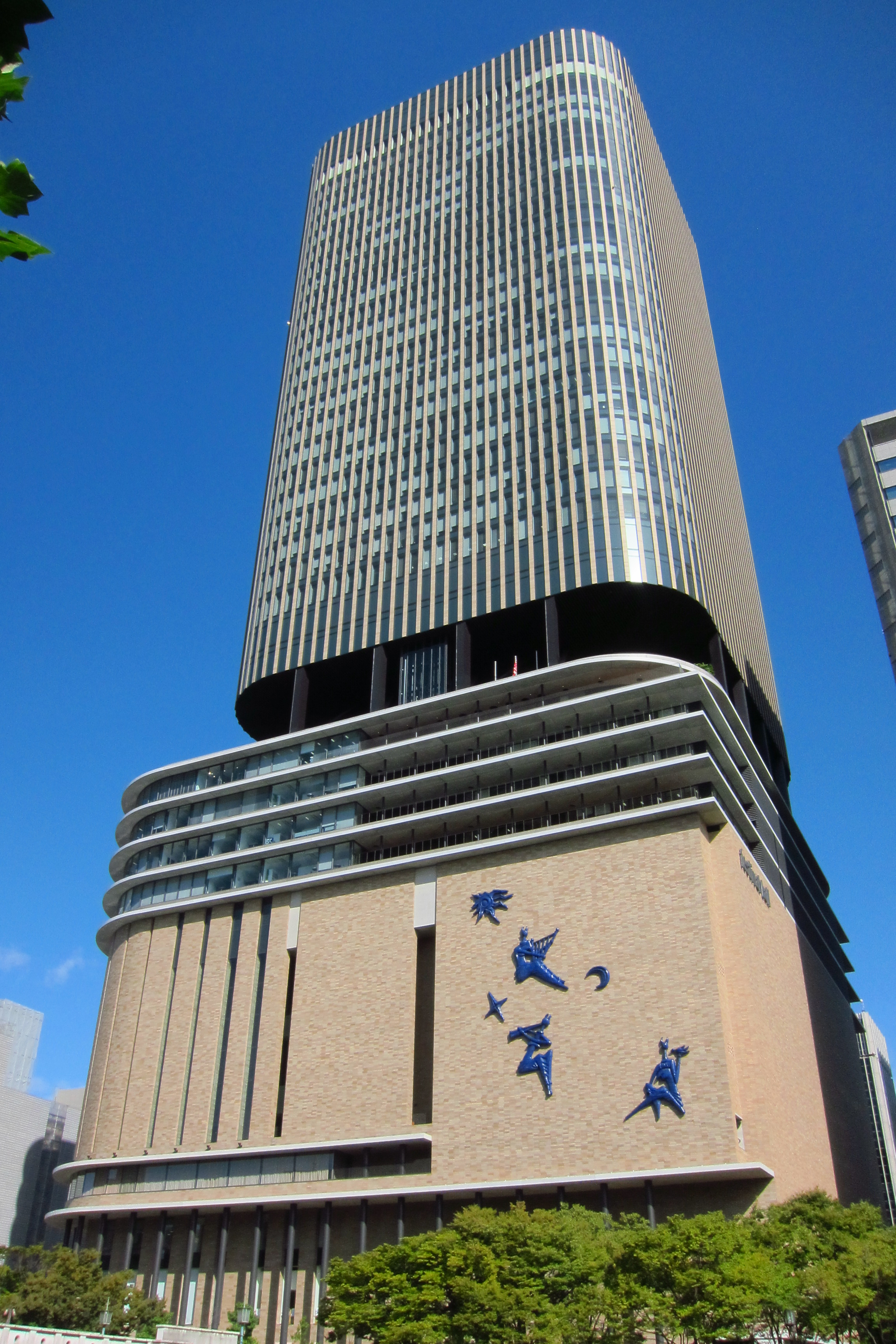
The Festival Hall in Osaka, 2013

Festival Hall (フェスティバルホール) is a concert hall located in Kita-ku, Osaka, Japan. It is run by the Asahi Building Co., Ltd., a Japanese real estate company controlling properties of the Asahi Shimbun Company, and is housed in the Festival Tower, a skyscraper. The opening ceremony for the new hall was held on April 3, 2013. The new hall has 2,700 seats, the same number of seats as the original hall.

The hall is home to the Osaka Philharmonic Orchestra. The orchestra moved its home to Symphony Hall in Oyodo-minami, Kita-ku after the original Festival Hall was closed in 2008, then moved again to the new Festival Hall one year after its opening.

== Original venue ==
Festival Hall was opened in 1958, on the occasion of the first Osaka International Festival for which it was specially built. The Shin Asahi Building was renovated into a skyscraper named Festival Tower East, the plan for which was announced in April 2007 by Asahi Shinbun Company, a group that includes the Asahi Building Co., Ltd. The original Festival Hall closed on December 30, 2008, and was subsequently torn down.

The original Festival Hall had great acoustic characteristics, loved by many renowned musicians, a number of whom such as Tatsuro Yamashita had expressed strong concerns about the reconstruction of the Hall. American group The Jackson Five, and British rock bands like Pink Floyd, Led Zeppelin, Deep Purple, Queen and Ten Years After all played the Festival Hall in the early 1970s during their first visit to Japan.

According to producer Jack Douglas, the audio from Cheap Trick at Budokan is actually from Osaka. The audio recording of the Tokyo show was unusable in 1978.

=== 1975 Miles Davis concerts ===
On February 1, 1975, Festival Hall hosted a series of concerts by Miles Davis during the musician's tour of Japan. The performances were captured by Columbia Records' Japanese division, then known as Sony, and released as two albums — Agharta (that day's afternoon concert) and Pangaea (the evening show).

== New venue ==
The construction of Festival Tower East started on January 9, 2010, and was completed on November 6, 2012. New Festival Hall was constructed on the 4th, 5th, 6th, 7th and 8th levels of the skyscraper. The traditional features are preserved, letting sound shower down on the audience and the scale of a 30 m (98 ft) wide stage and the seating capacity of 2,700. The opening ceremony for the new hall was held on April 3, 2013. As the first event at the new hall, the 51st Osaka International Festival was held from April 10 to 26.

== See also ==
- List of concert halls
