= The Complete Live at the Plugged Nickel 1965 =

1995 live album by Miles Davis

Box set by Miles Davis
- Released: July 8, 1995
- Recorded: December 22–23, 1965
- Venues: Plugged Nickel; Chicago
- Genres: Post-bop, hard bop, modal jazz
- Length: 7:32:03; 1:13:23 (Highlights disc)
- Labels: Sony; Columbia/Legacy
- Producer: Michael Cuscuna

Miles Davis live box set chronology
| The Complete Live at the Plugged Nickel 1965 (1995) | The Complete Miles Davis at Montreux (2002) |

Miles Davis live chronology
| Miles in Berlin (1964) | The Complete Live at the Plugged Nickel 1965 (1965) | Live in Europe 1967: The Bootleg Series Vol. 1 (1967) |

The Complete Live at the Plugged Nickel 1965 is a live box set of the Miles Davis Quintet, recorded on December 22 and 23, 1965. First released in Japan in March 1992 by Sony Records as a 7 disc set (catalogue SRCS 5766~5772), it was re-released on Legacy Records in July 1995 as an 8 disc set (catalogue CK 66955). In conjunction with Legacy, Mosaic Records released a 10 LP set (catalogue MQ10-158). It was re-released as an SA-CD Box in October 2023 in a limited edition of 1500 by Sony Japan for Tower Records Japan. It comprises recordings of seven performance sets over the two nights by the second great Davis quintet at the now-defunct Plugged Nickel nightclub in Chicago. A single-disc sampler, Highlights from the Plugged Nickel (catalogue CK 67377) was released by Legacy on November 14, 1995, and was reissued on February 1, 2008.

The box set provides the complete recordings to the concerts originally released as At Plugged Nickel, Chicago, Vol. 1 and At Plugged Nickel, Chicago, Vol. 2 in Japan and rereleased as Live at the Plugged Nickel by Columbia; this appeared also as At Plugged Nickel, Chicago (Album No. 25 / Discs 30 & 31) in the box set Miles Davis: The Complete Columbia Album Collection. Some tracks were available on Miles Davis compilations, but the full recordings were not released until the appearance of this box set.

== Background ==
The Plugged Nickel concerts came at the end of a difficult year for Davis. In April 1965, roughly three months after the recording of E.S.P., he underwent hip surgery, and was hospitalized until July. In August, while wrestling with one of his sons, he broke his leg, which required further hospitalization followed by the implantation of a plastic hip joint. By late fall, the quintet was finally back together, playing gigs in Philadelphia, Detroit, New York, and Washington, D.C., then travelling to Chicago for a 2 week engagement (December 21 to January 2) at the Plugged Nickel.

According to Wayne Shorter, by this point the group had "settle[d] back into a groove," causing the musicians to become restless and dissatisfied. Herbie Hancock stated: "we'd gotten so cohesive as a band that it had become easy to play together. We had figured out a formula for making it work, but of course playing by formula was exactly the opposite of what we wanted to do. We needed to put the challenge back in, to figure out ways to take more risks." He recalled: "everybody did things according to certain kinds of expectations. I knew if I did this, Ron would do that, or Tony knew that if he did this, I would do that. It became so easy to do that it was almost boring." On the flight to Chicago, Tony Williams came up with a solution, proposing that the group make "anti-music": "whatever someone expects you to play, that's the last thing you play..." After some discussion, the musicians agreed, but decided not to tell Davis. Hancock added: "Some people have suggested that Tony was trying to sabotage the band by doing this, but really he was only trying to sabotage our comfort level, to break us open again. It was just another step in trying to push our boundaries as musicians and as a band."

The Plugged Nickel set list consisted of mostly standards, with the exception of "Agitation" from E.S.P. Hancock wrote: "from the moment Miles counted off the first song, I started focusing on how I could play against expectation. Whenever a song would build up, getting to a natural peak, the natural inclination would be to push it over the top—but instead I would suddenly bring it down with one quiet note. Tony did the same, building up his playing in volume and intensity, and then, instead of hitting the bass drum, he'd gently tap the cymbal. We did the opposite, too, suddenly ratcheting up the intensity just as a tune was winding down." Shorter recalled: "When I heard those guys dropping the bottom out from under me, I knew it was 'Go for it' time!... I'd been in the band for a little over a year, and the next thing I knew we were way out there. It was like... this is what freedom means. The awareness was that the great responsibility that came with the territory was to push the envelope. You heard responsibility converted into expression that sounded like a great adventure." During these sets, tempos were shifted and tunes were stretched to the verge of unrecognizability.

Although Davis was still recovering from his ordeals, he seemed to enjoy the unexpected challenge, and allowed the other players extra space. According to Hancock, Davis "never said a word about it. He knew better than anyone that something strange was going on, but he never asked us, and we never told him. He just went with it. And he was brilliant!" At the conclusion of the concerts, according to Shorter, "we were raising so much hell [musically] that when we came off we couldn't say nothing to each other. We were lethargic in a princely way. We weren't trying to put on airs... it was like, 'let's not touch this.' You were in the royalty of the moment, and such royalty need never be tampered with." Hancock wrote that when he finally mustered the courage to listen to the recordings, he was surprised: "There was so much going on, and it sounded so little like what I remembered, that I was shocked. I really liked it, but I'm not even sure I could explain why. I would call it profound, except that the word 'profound,' to me, implies something that's deep and elegant. This was not elegant. This was naked and had guts. It was raw. To this day, when I hear recordings from the Plugged Nickel, I'm knocked out by their sheer raw intensity and honesty."

== Content ==
Each disc of the box set of 8 discs presents one complete set, with the exception of the second set on the first night of December 22, which is split onto two discs, with the discs in a slimline case and internally numbered accordingly as 2a and 2b. The reasoning for this on the part of Legacy is unclear, since the total timing of the music on discs 2a and 2b is under the 80-minute single disc limit. The original Japanese 7 disc release combined the same tracks onto a single disc 2.

== Reception ==
Professional ratings
Review scores
| Source | Rating |
|---|---|
| AllMusic | 5/5 stars |
| The Rolling Stone Record Guide | 5/5 stars |
| The Penguin Guide to Jazz Recordings | 4/4 stars |

The box set has been awarded a rare crown by the Penguin Guide to Jazz, concluding that "these are genuinely historic recordings." AllMusic reviewer Scott Yanow awarded the album 5 stars, calling the music "continually fascinating" and "[o]ne of the top releases of 1995". Writing for All About Jazz, C. Michael Bailey stated: "All of the pieces performed at the Plugged Nickel were a look at the old stuff through radically different glasses". He wrote that the performances "represent Davis' effort to return to the classics and recast them in the new mode he was creating. The results were—and are—fantastic."

Don Heckman, in a review for the Los Angeles Times, wrote "What makes this collection... arresting is the manner in which Davis and his sidemen reached into such expansive improvisational areas while performing a program that, with the exception of 'Agitation,' consisted of standards and material from earlier repertoire... This two-night window on Davis, performing at the peak of his skills in partnership with one of his finest groups, provides both an invaluable historical document and a constantly mesmerizing listening experience." In a column reviewing Davis' "20 best albums", John Fordham ranked the Plugged Nickel recordings #6, and called them "[m]aybe the best-ever representation of 'the second great quintet' at work. Superbly recorded... the set finds Miles, Wayne Shorter, Herbie Hancock, Ron Carter and Tony Williams reinventing small-band jazz with an all-but-psychic flexibility of timing and on-the-fly harmonising."

The authors of Miles Davis: The Complete Illustrated History stated that the Plugged Nickel recordings "capture the Quintet in full flight, ranging through Miles' catalog and playing with such extraordinary grace that many aficionados consider the rhythm section of Williams–Carter–Hancock jazz's finest ever." Keith Waters wrote that the tracks "show the group moving even further towards free jazz and abstraction in the context of standard tune improvisation. Ever exploratory, these recordings made even the innovations of the previous work seem confining... the Plugged Nickel recordings... appeared to the members as a significant moment in the group's evolution."

Pianist Jodie Christian, one of the founders of the AACM, was in the audience, and recalled: "Technically, they listened to one another and played together unlike any other band I'd ever heard... Everybody heard each other and was able to respond to the same thing. At intermission everybody in the audience would talk excitedly about what we were hearing, because they were playing both free-form and conventional. I don't think I ever heard anything like that again." Trumpeter Dave Douglas expressed his admiration for Shorter's solo on "On Green Dolphin Street", writing: "it's the counterintuitive choices Shorter makes in this solo that really get me. By counterintuitive I mean: Shorter seems to use the unusual notes in a chord or voice-leading moment to connote other harmonic areas, keys and scales, and somehow always manages to resolve the dissonance tunefully but almost never in the way you expect. It helps that his dialogue with the rest of the band is telepathic, with each interesting harmonic, melodic and rhythmic choice leading to an intelligent and emotive response. The deeper you listen, the more profound those choices seem. That makes a great improvisation, no matter the music or style."

When the 1982 Plugged Nickel recording came out, Wynton Marsalis visited Shorter at his home and asked if they could listen to the music together while Marsalis watched Shorter's facial expressions.

== The Complete Live at the Plugged Nickel 1965 track listing ==
All tracks are written by Miles Davis unless otherwise specified.

Disc 1: December 22, 1965 — first set
| No. | Title | Writer(s) | Length |
|---|---|---|---|
| 1. | "If I Were a Bell" | Frank Loesser | 16:42 |
| 2. | "Stella by Starlight" | Ned Washington; Victor Young | 12:49 |
| 3. | "Walkin'" | Richard Carpenter | 15:51 |
| 4. | "I Fall in Love Too Easily" | Jule Styne; Sammy Cahn | 11:43 |
| 5. | "The Theme" | | 10:19 |
| Total length: | | | 1:07:51 |

Disc 2a: December 22, 1965 — second set
| No. | Title | Writer(s) | Length |
|---|---|---|---|
| 1. | "My Funny Valentine" | Richard Rodgers; Lorenz Hart | 16:33 |
| 2. | "Four" | Eddie "Cleanhead" Vinson | 15:05 |
| 3. | "When I Fall in Love" | Edward Heyman; Victor Young | 10:44 |
| Total length: | | | 42:41 |

Disc 2b: December 22, 1965 — second set
| No. | Title | Writer(s) | Length |
|---|---|---|---|
| 1. | "Agitation" | | 13:13 |
| 2. | "Round Midnight" | Bernie Hanighen; Cootie Williams; Thelonious Monk | 8:42 |
| 3. | "Milestones" | | 14:04 |
| 4. | "The Theme" | | 0:38 |
| Total length: | | | 36:47 |

Disc 3: December 22, 1965 — third set
| No. | Title | Writer(s) | Length |
|---|---|---|---|
| 1. | "All of You" | Cole Porter | 14:38 |
| 2. | "Oleo" | Sonny Rollins | 6:05 |
| 3. | "I Fall in Love Too Easily" | Styne; Cahn | 11:53 |
| 4. | "No Blues" | | 17:35 |
| 5. | "I Thought About You" | Johnny Mercer; Jimmy van Heusen | 11:03 |
| 6. | "The Theme" | | 8:05 |
| Total length: | | | 1:09:19 |

Disc 4: December 23, 1965 — first set
| No. | Title | Writer(s) | Length |
|---|---|---|---|
| 1. | "If I Were a Bell" | Loesser | 13:29 |
| 2. | "Stella by Starlight" | Washington; Young | 13:09 |
| 3. | "Walkin'" | Carpenter | 11:01 |
| 4. | "I Fall in Love Too Easily" | Styne; Cahn | 12:07 |
| 5. | "The Theme" | | 2:50 |
| Total length: | | | 52:51 |

Disc 5: December 23, 1965 — second set
| No. | Title | Writer(s) | Length |
|---|---|---|---|
| 1. | "All of You" | Porter | 10:39 |
| 2. | "Agitation" | | 10:48 |
| 3. | "My Funny Valentine" | Rodgers; Hart | 13:52 |
| 4. | "On Green Dolphin Street" | Washington; Bronisław Kaper | 12:48 |
| 5. | "So What" | | 13:36 |
| 6. | "The Theme" | | 3:28 |
| Total length: | | | 1:05:55 |

Disc 6: December 23, 1965 — third set
| No. | Title | Writer(s) | Length |
|---|---|---|---|
| 1. | "When I Fall in Love" | Heyman; Young | 13:39 |
| 2. | "Milestones" | | 11:49 |
| 3. | "Autumn Leaves" | Joseph Kosma; Jacques Prévert; Mercer | 11:56 |
| 4. | "I Fall in Love Too Easily" | Styne; Cahn | 11:43 |
| 5. | "No Blues" | | 20:06 |
| 6. | "The Theme" | | 0:22 |
| Total length: | | | 1:09:44 |

Disc 7: December 23, 1965 — fourth set
| No. | Title | Writer(s) | Length |
|---|---|---|---|
| 1. | "Stella by Starlight" | Washington; Young | 14:16 |
| 2. | "All Blues" | | 12:18 |
| 3. | "Yesterdays" | Jerome Kern; Otto Harbach | 15:00 |
| 4. | "The Theme" | | 4:51 |
| Total length: | | | 46:55 |

== Highlights from the Plugged Nickel ==
Highlights from the Plugged Nickel

Compilation album by Miles Davis
- Released: November 21, 1995
- Recorded: December 22–23, 1965
- Genres: Jazz music, hard bop, avant-garde jazz
- Length: 73:17
- Label: Sony
- Producer: Teo Macero

Miles Davis chronology
| The Ballad Artistry Of Miles Davis (1995) | Highlights from the Plugged Nickel (1995) | Ballads and Blues (1996) |

Professional ratings
Review scores
| Source | Rating |
|---|---|
| AllMusic | (Highlights) |
| The Penguin Guide to Jazz Recordings | (Highlights) |

Highlights from the Plugged Nickel is a compilation album by American jazz musician Miles Davis, released on November 21, 1995, by Sony Music Records and recorded from December 22 through December 23, 1965 at the Plugged Nickel. It consists of several tunes from The Complete Live at the Plugged Nickel 1965.

=== Track listing ===
| No. | Title | Writer(s) | Date & Set | Length |
|---|---|---|---|---|
| 1. | "Milestones" | Miles Davis | 12/23 Third | 11:49 |
| 2. | "Yesterdays" | Kern, Harbach | 12/23 Fourth | 15:00 |
| 3. | "So What" | Miles Davis | 12/23 Second | 13:36 |
| 4. | "Stella by Starlight" | Washington, Young | 12/23 First | 13:09 |
| 5. | "Walkin'" | Richard Carpenter | 12/23 First | 11:01 |
| 6. | "'Round Midnight" | Hanighen, Williams, Monk | 12/22 Second | 8:42 |

== Charts ==
=== Weekly charts ===
Weekly chart performance for The Complete Live at the Plugged Nickel 1965
| Chart (2023–2026) | Peak position |
|---|---|
| French Jazz Albums (SNEP) | 9 |
| French Physical Albums (SNEP) | 105 |
| Japanese Albums (Oricon) | 38 |
| Scottish Albums (Official Charts) | 37 |
| UK Albums Sales (OCC) | 43 |
| US Top Jazz Albums (Billboard) | 13 |

Chart performance for Live At The Plugged Nickel: December 23, 1965 - Second Set
| Chart (2025) | Peak position |
|---|---|
| Australian Jazz & Blues Albums (ARIA) | 5 |

Chart performance for Highlights from the Plugged Nickel
| Chart (2025) | Peak position |
|---|---|
| Billboard Top Jazz Albums | 9 |

=== Monthly charts ===
Monthly chart performance for The Complete Live at the Plugged Nickel 1965
| Chart (2026) | Peak position |
|---|---|
| German Jazz Albums (Offizielle Top 100) | 4 |

== Personnel ==
- Miles Davis – trumpet
- Wayne Shorter – tenor saxophone
- Herbie Hancock – piano
- Ron Carter – double bass
- Tony Williams – drums
