= Forever Miles Davis =

Compilation album by Miles Davis
- Released: September 18, 2007
- Recorded: May 11, 1956 + October 26, 1956
- Genre: Jazz music, hard bop, post bop
- Length: 111:10
- Label: Madacy Special Markets

Miles Davis chronology
Evolution of the Groove (2007)	Forever Miles Davis (2007)	Cool: The Best of Miles Davis (2007)

Forever Miles Davis is a three-disc compilation album by American jazz musician Miles Davis, released in 1981 by independent label Madacy Special Markets.

== Track listing ==
=== Disc 1 ===
1. "My Funny Valentine" (Hart, Rodgers) – 6:04
2. "Blues by Five" (Garland) – 10:23
3. "Airegin" (Rollins) – 4:26
4. "Tune-Up/When Lights Are Low" (Carter, Davis, Williams) – 13:09

=== Disc 2 ===
1. "If I Were a Bell" (Loesser) – 8:18
2. "You're My Everything" (Dixon, Warren, Young) – 5:19
3. "I Could Write a Book" (Hart, Rodgers) – 5:10
4. "Oleo" (Rollins) – 6:20
5. "It Could Happen to You" (Burke, VanHeusen) – 6:39
6. "Woody'n You" (Gillespie) – 5:02

=== Disc 3 ===
1. "It Never Entered My Mind" (Hart, Rodgers) – 5:26
2. "Four" (Davis) – 7:15
3. "In Your Own Sweet Way" (Brubeck) – 5:45
4. "The Theme [Take 1]" (Davis) – 2:01
5. "Trane's Blues" (Coltrane) – 8:35
6. "Ahmad's Blues" (Jamal) – 7:27
7. "Half Nelson" (Davis) – 4:47
8. "The Theme [Take 2]" (Davis) – 1:04

== Personnel ==
- Rikka Arnold – project assistant
- Dave Brubeck – composing
- Johnny Burke – composer
- Emmanuel Campeau – cover design
- Chris Clough – project assistant
- John Coltrane – composing, tenor saxophone
- Miles Davis – composer, trumpet
- Esmond Edwards – cover design
- Zev Feldman – project assistant
- Red Garland – composer, piano
- Dizzy Gillespie – composer
- Ira Gitler – liner notes
- Joe Goldberg – liner notes
- Lorenz Hart – composer
- Jimmy Van Heusen – composer
- Terri Hinte – project assistant
- Ahmad Jamal – composer
- Philly Joe Jones – drums
- Stuart Kremsky – reissue production assistant
- Frank Loesser – composer
- Jack Maher – liner notes
- Reid Miles – cover design
- Cheryl Pawelski – project assistant
- Nick Phillips – reissues producer, reissues supervisor
- Richard Rodgers – composer
- Sonny Rollins – composer
- David Roy – liner notes
- Rudy Van Gelder – author, engineering, remastering
- Bob Weinstock – supervisor

== Charting history ==
Chart	Peak chart position
Billboard Top Jazz Albums	20
