= The Complete Miles Davis at Montreux =

Box set by Miles Davis
- Released: 2002
- Recorded: July 8, 1973 – July 17, 1991
- Venues: Montreux Jazz Festival; Lake Geneva, Switzerland
- Genre: Jazz fusion
- Length: 19:00:42
- Label: Columbia
- Producer: Claude Nobs

Miles Davis live box set chronology
The Complete Live at the Plugged Nickel 1965 (1995)	The Complete Miles Davis at Montreux (2002)	In Person Friday and Saturday Nights at the Blackhawk, Complete (2003)

Miles Davis live chronology
In Concert (1972)	The Complete Miles Davis at Montreux (1973)	Dark Magus (1974)

Professional ratings
Review scores
Source	Rating
AllMusic	5/5 stars
The Penguin Guide to Jazz Recordings	4/4 stars

The Complete Miles Davis at Montreux is a box set of twenty discs compiling the eleven sets Miles Davis performed at his nine appearances at the Montreux Jazz Festival between 1973 and 1991 released in 2002.

== Track listing ==
All tracks are written by Miles Davis unless otherwise noted.

Disc one: July 8, 1973
No.	Title	Length
1.	"Miles in Montreux 73, part 1" (Turnaroundphrase)	16:35
2.	"Miles in Montreux 73, part 2" (Tune in 5)	19:53
Total length:		36:28

Disc two: July 8, 1973
No.	Title	Length
1.	"Ife"	27:23
2.	"Calypso Frelimo"	16:00
3.	"Miles in Montreux 73, part 3" (Unknown 730620)	14:51
Total length:		58:14 1:34:42

Disc three: July 8, 1984 (Afternoon)
No.	Title	Writer(s)	Length
1.	"Speak/That's What Happened"	Miles Davis; John Scofield	11:43
2.	"New Blues"		8:41
3.	"What It Is"	Davis; Scofield	8:05
4.	"It Gets Better"		13:46
5.	"Something on Your Mind"	Hubert Eaves III; James Williams	11:10
Total length:			53:25

Disc four: July 8, 1984 (Afternoon)
No.	Title	Writer(s)	Length
1.	"Time after Time"	Cyndi Lauper; Rob Hyman	13:56
2.	"Hopscotch"	Marcus Miller	7:11
3.	"Bass Solo"		1:26
4.	"Jean Pierre"		10:07
5.	"Lake Geneva"		4:20
6.	"Something on Your Mind" (Reprise)	Eaves III; Williams	7:31
Total length:			44:31 1:37:56

Disc five: July 8, 1984 (Evening)
No.	Title	Writer(s)	Length
1.	"Speak/That's What Happened"	Davis; Scofield	8:29
2.	"New Blues"		9:06
3.	"What It Is"	Davis; Scofield	9:21
4.	"It Gets Better"		13:30
5.	"Something on Your Mind"	Eaves III; Williams	13:00
Total length:			53:26

Disc six: July 8, 1984 (Evening)
No.	Title	Writer(s)	Length
1.	"Time After Time"	Lauper; Hyman	12:08
2.	"Hopscotch"	Miller	8:09
3.	"Bass Solo"		1:53
4.	"Jean Pierre"		10:31
5.	"Lake Geneva"		3:16
6.	"Something on Your Mind" (Reprise)	Eaves III; Williams	10:45
7.	"Code M.D."	Robert Irving III	6:51
Total length:			53:33 1:46:59

Disc seven: July 14, 1985 (Afternoon)
No.	Title	Writer(s)	Length
1.	"One Phone Call/Street Scenes/That's What Happened"	Davis; Scofield	13:27
2.	"New Blues"		6:39
3.	"Maze"	Davis; Erin Davis; Randy Hall; Zane Giles	9:55
4.	"Human Nature"	Steve Porcaro; John Bettis	5:31
5.	"MD 1/Something on Your Mind/MD 2"	Davis; Eaves III; Williams	13:24
6.	"Time after Time"	Lauper; Hyman	8:18
7.	"Ms. Morrisine"	Morrisine Tynes Irving; Davis; Irving III	10:36
Total length:			1:07:48

Disc eight: July 14, 1985 (Afternoon)
No.	Title	Writer(s)	Length
1.	"Code M.D."	Irving III	8:01
2.	"Pacific Express"	John McLaughlin	14:46
3.	"Katia"	Irving III	7:07
4.	"Hopscotch"	Miller	5:55
5.	"You're under Arrest"	Scofield	6:38
6.	"Jean Pierre/You're under Arrest/Then There Were None"	Davis; Scofield	9:04
7.	"Decoy"	Irving III	4:13
Total length:			55:44 2:03:32

Disc nine: July 14, 1985 (Evening)
No.	Title	Writer(s)	Length
1.	"One Phone Call/Street Scenes/That's What Happened"	Davis; Scofield	14:06
2.	"New Blues"		6:16
3.	"Maze"	Davis; Erin Davis; Hall; Giles	10:05
4.	"Human Nature"	Porcaro; Bettis	7:37
5.	"MD 1/Something on Your Mind/MD 2"	Davis; Eaves III; Williams	13:24
6.	"Time after Time"	Lauper; Hyman	11:07
Total length:			1:02:35

Disc ten: July 14, 1985 (Evening)
No.	Title	Writer(s)	Length
1.	"Ms. Morrisine"	Irving; Davis; Irving III	10:12
2.	"Code M.D."	Irving III	8:10
3.	"Pacific Express"	McLaughlin	15:25
4.	"Katia"	Irving III	8:15
5.	"Hopscotch"	Miller	7:41
6.	"You're Under Arrest"	Scofield	7:16
7.	"Jean Pierre/You're Under Arrest/Then There Were None"	Davis; Scofield	8:43
8.	"Decoy"	Irving III	5:04
Total length:			1:00:46 2:03:21

Disc eleven: July 17, 1986
No.	Title	Writer(s)	Length
1.	"One Phone Call/Street Scenes/That's What Happened"	Davis; Scofield	9:08
2.	"New Blues"		5:55
3.	"Maze"	Davis; Erin Davis; Hall; Giles	10:20
4.	"Human Nature"	Porcaro; Bettis	8:36
5.	"Wrinkle"	Davis; Erin Davis; Hall; Giles; Wayne Linsey	10:55
6.	"Tutu"	Miller	6:53
7.	"Splatch"	Miller	11:16
Total length:			1:03:03

Disc twelve: July 17, 1986
No.	Title	Writer(s)	Length
1.	"Time after Time"	Lauper; Hyman	8:32
2.	"Al Jarreau"		6:23
3.	"Carnival Time"	Neil Larsen	4:27
4.	"Burn"	Irving III; Hall	8:26
5.	"Portia"	Miller	7:22
6.	"Jean Pierre"		9:35
Total length:			44:45 1:47:48

Disc thirteen: July 7, 1988
No.	Title	Writer(s)	Length
1.	"In a Silent Way"	Joe Zawinul	1:04
2.	"Intruder"		4:54
3.	"New Blues"		7:07
4.	"Perfect Way"	Green Gartside; David Gamson	4:50
5.	"The Senate/Me and You"	Joseph "Foley" McCreary	9:20
6.	"Human Nature"	Porcaro; Bettis	13:01
7.	"Wrinkle"	Davis; Erin Davis; Hall; Giles; Linsey	8:15
8.	"Tutu"	Miller	11:05
9.	"Time after Time"	Lauper; Hyman	8:11
Total length:			1:07:47

Disc fourteen: July 7, 1988
No.	Title	Writer(s)	Length
1.	"Movie Star"	Prince Rogers Nelson	4:27
2.	"Splatch"	Miller	9:22
3.	"Heavy Metal Prelude"		5:23
4.	"Heavy Metal"		6:25
5.	"Don't Stop Me Now"	Steve Lukather; David Paich	7:19
6.	"Carnival Time"	Larsen	13:19
7.	"Jean Pierre"		8:50
8.	"Tomaas"	Davis; Miller	11:08
Total length:			1:06:13 2:14:00

Disc fifteen: July 21, 1989
No.	Title	Writer(s)	Length
1.	"Intruder"		5:47
2.	"New Blues"		12:08
3.	"Perfect Way"	Gartside; Gamson	6:35
4.	"Hannibal"	Miller	10:43
5.	"Human Nature"	Porcaro; Bettis	10:50
6.	"Mr. Pastorius"	Miller	4:31
7.	"Tutu"	Miller	13:29
Total length:			1:04:03

Disc sixteen: July 21, 1989
No.	Title	Writer(s)	Length
1.	"Jilli"	John Bigham	5:56
2.	"Time after Time"	Lauper; Hyman	10:46
3.	"Jo Jo"	Miller	5:35
4.	"Amandla"		5:16
5.	"The Senate/Me and You"	J. McCreary	11:47
6.	"Wrinkle"	Davis; E. Davis; Hall; Giles; Linsey	6:50
7.	"Portia"	Miller	7:47
Total length:			53:57 1:58:00

Disc seventeen: July 20, 1990
No.	Title	Writer(s)	Length
1.	"Perfect Way"	Gartside; Gamson	6:00
2.	"New Blues"		8:31
3.	Untitled	Miller	10:44
4.	"The Senate/Me and You"	J. McCreary	10:51
5.	"In the Night"	Larry Blackmon; Merv de Peyer	3:15
6.	"Human Nature"	Porcaro; Bettis	12:48
7.	"Time after Time"	Lauper; Hyman	9:13
Total length:			1:01:22

Disc eighteen: July 20, 1990
No.	Title	Writer(s)	Length
1.	"Wrinkle"	Davis; E. Davis; Hall; Giles; Linsey	8:10
2.	"Tutu"	Miller	13:31
3.	"Don't Stop Me Now"	Lukather; Paitch	11:22
4.	"Carnival Time"	Larsen	13:38
Total length:			46:41 1:48:03

Disc nineteen: July 8, 1991
No.	Title	Writer(s)	Length
1.	"Introduction"	Claude Nobs; Quincy Jones	1:22
2.	"Boplicity"	Davis; Gil Evans	3:40
3.	"Springsville" (with introduction)	John Carisi	3:42
4.	"The Maids of Cadiz"	Leo Delibes	3:36
5.	"The Duke"	Dave Brubeck	4:00
6.	"My Ship"	Kurt Weill; Ira Gershwin	4:10
7.	"Miles Ahead"	Davis; G. Evans	3:38
8.	"Blues for Pablo"	G. Evans	6:00
9.	"Introduction"	Quincy Jones	0:27
10.	"Gone"	G. Evans	4:10
11.	"Gone, Gone, Gone"	Dubose Heyward; George Gershwin; Ira Gershwin	1:47
12.	"Summertime"	Gershwin; Gershwin; Heyward	2:54
13.	"Here Come de Honey Man"	Heyward; Gershwin; Gershwin	3:40
14.	"The Pan Piper"	G. Evans	1:40
15.	"Solea"	G. Evans	11:37
Total length:			56:23 56:23

Disc twenty: July 17, 1991
No.	Title	Writer(s)	Length
1.	"Perfect Way"	Gartside; Gamson	5:34
2.	"New Blues"		15:37
3.	"Hannibal"	Miller	17:41
4.	"Human Nature"	Porcaro; Bettis	16:57
5.	"Time after Time"	Lauper; Hyman	9:47
6.	"Wrinkle"	Davis; E. Davis; Hall; Giles; Linsey	4:22
Total length:			1:09:58 1:09:58 19:00:42
