= Pangaea (album) =

Live album by Miles Davis
- Released: 1976
- Recorded: February 1, 1975
- Venue: Festival Hall in Osaka
- Genres: Jazz fusion; jazz-funk; progressive rock
- Length: 88:38
- Label: CBS/Sony
- Producer: Teo Macero

Miles Davis chronology
| Live at the Plugged Nickel (1976) | Pangaea (1976) | Water Babies (1976) |

Miles Davis live chronology
| Agharta (1975) | Pangaea (1975) | We Want Miles (1981) |

Pangaea is a live album by American jazz trumpeter, composer, and bandleader Miles Davis. It was originally released as a double album in 1976 by CBS/Sony in Japan.

Recorded during Davis' electric period, the album captures the second of two concerts he performed on February 1, 1975, at Osaka's Festival Hall. As with the first concert (captured on the 1975 album Agharta), Davis led a band featuring guitarists Pete Cosey and Reggie Lucas, saxophonist Sonny Fortune, bassist Michael Henderson, drummer Al Foster, and percussionist James Mtume.

== Composition and performance ==
Both Pangaea and its predecessor Agharta were recorded on February 1, 1975, in Osaka, Japan, at the Festival Hall. The Agharta concert took place during an afternoon matinee, whereas Pangaea was recorded in the evening. This album's music was split into two tracks, "Zimbabwe" and "Gondwana", the latter of which was the name of the ancient supercontinent, as was "Pangaea".

As with most of Davis's live performances from this era, the band used a number of riffs or fragments as the basis for long semi-improvised suites rather than performing individual songs. The musicians were mostly a generation younger than Davis, and the overall sound was inspired by rock and funk as much as jazz. According to discographer Peter Losin, the first track contains performances of "Turnaroundphrase", "Tune in 5", "Turnaroundphrase" again, "Tune in 5" again and "Zimbabwe" (not to be confused with the actual medley recording's title). The second track contains performances of "Ife", and "For Dave (Mr. Foster)", performed in that order.

== Release ==
The album was first released exclusively in Japan by CBS Sony in 1976. It did not see release anywhere else until 1990, when in May that year, Columbia Records released Pangaea on CD in the United States, as part of the label's Columbia Jazz Contemporary Masters reissue program.

== Critical reception ==
Retrospective professional reviews
Review scores
| Source | Rating |
|---|---|
| AllMusic | 4.5/5 stars |
| Christgau's Consumer Guide | (2-star Honorable Mention) |
| Down Beat | 5/5 stars |
| Encyclopedia of Popular Music | 3/5 stars |
| The Great Rock Discography | 6/10 |
| Los Angeles Times | 3/4 stars |
| MusicHound Jazz | 5/5 |
| The Penguin Guide to Jazz | 3.5/4 stars |
| The Rolling Stone Album Guide | 5/5 stars |
| Tom Hull – on the Web | B+ |

In The Village Voice, Robert Christgau gave Pangaea's CD reissue an honorable mention, citing "Zimbabwe" as the highlight while lamenting the flute playing and scant track listing. Davis biographer Jack Chambers found the performance "vastly" inferior to Agharta, as did Paul Tingen, who lamented Davis' reduced presence and role directing his band. Tingen also observed "a sense of tiredness and drift", which he attributed to the septet having played the first concert earlier that day: "There are several extended periods during which the band just plays out the grooves, waiting for Miles to give the next cue." In the Los Angeles Times, Bill Kohlhaase called Pangaea "a striking personal soundtrack of decline that, like Miles himself, suffers from exhaustion before playing itself out".

AllMusic's Thom Jurek was more enthusiastic. Although he found the band less impressive here than on Agharta, Jurek said some individual members stood out more on Pangaea, which he found just "as relentless" and "plenty satisfying". J. D. Considine rated it half-a-star higher than Agharta in The Rolling Stone Album Guide. In The Penguin Guide to Jazz, Richard Cook and Brian Morton wrote that like its predecessor, Pangaea's lengthy performances combined musical forms from African-American genres with Karlheinz Stockhausen's "conception of a 'world music' that moves like creeping tectonic plates". Furthermore, Cook and Morton write that 'Miles's trumpet playing on these bruising, unconscionable records is of the highest and most adventurous order...' In May 1991, Pangaea was voted the ninth best reissue of the year in the Pazz & Jop, an annual poll of American critics published in The Village Voice.

In naming it the 256th best 'heavy metal' album up to 1991, the author Chuck Eddy described Pangaea as a pair of jam sessions that "lasts too long", but spotlighted it as the only jazz album he knew with a printed demand to be played at the loudest possible volume; he praised the musicianship and in particular felt Cosey and Lucas were the highlights of the album after the opening ten minutes, writing that they "[unload] this unmatched speedcurdle as if they're Slayer's Kerry King and Motörhead's Fast Eddie Clarke, wasting the world." In his book Copendium (2012), Julian Cope describes Pangaea as a "far more distilled take on the music" than Agharta, and said of the similarity between the introductory beats of "Zimbabwe" and "Moja" from Dark Magus (recorded in 1974), "[the] sameness of the rhythm secured the listener in the knowledge that here was an African equivalent to the strictly defined rhythmic parameters of reggae."

== Influence ==
As with several other of Davis' live albums from the period, Pangaea became an influence on several no wave and funk artists. Highbrow new wave and punk rock musicians, including Tom Verlaine of Television and Robert Quine, were also influenced by the album after managing to obtain copies as an import from Japan. In his discussion of the album's climax, Cope writes that Davis' band "sails right up the flooded avenues of No New York and on into post-Atlantean Harlem, far uptown, where James Brown, George Clinton, Sly Stone and the ghost of Jimi Hendrix are all waiting to board".

== Track listing ==
=== 1976 LP ===
Side one
| No. | Title | Length |
|---|---|---|
| 1. | "Zimbabwe" (Part 1) | 20:25 |

Side two
| No. | Title | Length |
|---|---|---|
| 1. | "Zimbabwe" (Part 2) | 21:13 |

Side three
| No. | Title | Length |
|---|---|---|
| 1. | "Gondwana" (Part 1) | 23:23 |

Side four
| No. | Title | Length |
|---|---|---|
| 1. | "Gondwana" (Part 2) | 23:57 |

=== 1991 CD ===
Disc one
| No. | Title | Length |
|---|---|---|
| 1. | "Zimbabwe" | 41:48 |

Disc two
| No. | Title | Length |
|---|---|---|
| 1. | "Gondwana" | 46:50 |

- "Gondwana" runs a length of 49:46 on the album's 1996 Japanese reissue.

== Personnel ==
=== Musicians ===
- Miles Davis – electric trumpet with wah-wah, organ
- Sonny Fortune – soprano saxophone, alto saxophone, flute
- Pete Cosey – electric guitar, synthesizer, percussion
- Reggie Lucas – electric guitar
- Michael Henderson – electric bass
- Al Foster – drums
- James "Mtume" Foreman – conga, percussion, water drum, rhythm box

=== Production ===
- Producer – Teo Macero
- Director – Keiichi Nakamura
- Engineer – Tamoo Suzuki
- Assistant Engineer – Mitsuru Kasai, Takaaki Amano
- Package Coordination – Tony Tiller
- Artwork – Teruhisa Tajima
