= Panthalassa: The Remixes =

Remix album by Miles Davis
- Released: May 25, 1999
- Genre: Acid jazz, fusion
- Length: 46:48
- Label: Columbia/SME Records
- Producer: Jamie Myerson, Doc Scott

Professional ratings
Review scores
Source	Rating
Allmusic	3/5 stars
The Penguin Guide to Jazz Recordings	3/4 stars
Pitchfork	6.5/10

Panthalassa: The Remixes is a remix album by Miles Davis, released on May 25, 1999. It contains compositions from the prior albums, including In a Silent Way, Get Up With It and On the Corner.

== Track listing ==
No.	Title	Music	Length
1.	"Shhh (SEA4 Miles Remix)"	Miles Davis	10:27
2.	"Black Satin/On the Corner (DJ Krush Remix) *"	Davis	6:17
3.	"Rated X (Doc Scott Remix)"	Davis	6:41
4.	"In a Silent Way (DJ Cam Remix)"	Joe Zawinul	5:05
5.	"On the Corner (Subterranean Channel Mix)"	Davis	16:42
6.	"Rated X (Jamie Myerson Remix)"	Davis	8:02

* Only featured on the vinyl LP release of the album.

== Personnel ==
- Miles Davis – trumpet
- Mark Boyce – Fender Rhodes, Polymoog
- Phillip Charles – ARP 2600, Roland Jupiter-6, remixing
- DJ Cam – mixing, remixing
- Sean Evans – design
- King Britt – additional production, drum programming, Fender Rhodes, remixing
- Bill Laswell – mixing translation, reconstruction
- Robert Musso – engineer
- Jamie Myerson – producer, remixing
- Doc Scott – engineer, producer, remix producer, remixing
- Jon Smeltz – engineer, mixing
