= Black Beauty: Miles Davis at Fillmore West =

Live album by Miles Davis
- Released: 1973
- Recorded: April 10, 1970
- Venues: Fillmore West auditorium, Fillmore Street, San Francisco, CA
- Genres: Jazz-funk; jazz-rock; jazz fusion
- Length: 79:20
- Label: CBS/Sony
- Producer: Teo Macero

Miles Davis chronology
On the Corner (1972)	Black Beauty: Miles Davis at Fillmore West (1973)	In Concert (1973)

Miles Davis live chronology
Live at the Fillmore East, March 7, 1970: It's About That Time (1970)	Black Beauty: Miles Davis at Fillmore West (1970)	Miles at the Fillmore – Miles Davis 1970: The Bootleg Series Vol. 3 (1970)

Black Beauty: Miles Davis at Fillmore West is a live double album by the American jazz trumpeter, composer, and bandleader Miles Davis. It was recorded on April 10, 1970, at the Fillmore West in San Francisco, shortly after the release of the trumpeter's Bitches Brew album and the recording of Jack Johnson (1971). Black Beauty was produced by Teo Macero, Davis' longtime record producer. A jazz-rock and fusion album, Black Beauty captured one of Davis' first performances at a rock venue during the early stages of his electric period. At the concert, he led his band—saxophonist Steve Grossman, bassist Dave Holland, keyboardist Chick Corea, drummer Jack DeJohnette, and percussionist Airto Moreira—through one continuously performed set list which functioned as a musical suite for soloists to improvise throughout. He signaled changes from one piece to the next with phrases played on his trumpet.

Black Beauty was first released only in Japan by CBS/Sony in 1973 without individual songs specified in the track listing. Columbia Records, Davis' American record label, had difficulty identifying the compositions for royalty purposes, and the album was not released in the United States until 1997. Critics were generally positive toward Black Beauty, although some were critical of its sound quality and Grossman's solos; Corea said the recording was an accurate document how that particular band of Davis' played live.

== Background ==
Black Beauty was recorded in concert at the Fillmore West in San Francisco on April 10, 1970, when Davis performed as the opening act for the Grateful Dead. The performance took place soon after his studio album Bitches Brew had been released to stores, and he played some songs from the album. Davis led an ensemble that featured soprano saxophonist Steve Grossman, bassist Dave Holland, keyboardist Chick Corea, drummer Jack DeJohnette, and percussionist Airto Moreira. After the departure of saxophonist Wayne Shorter from the group earlier that year, Grossman was enlisted by Davis to participate in an April 7 recording session for his next album Jack Johnson (1971) before joining the live band.

The April 10 show was the second of four concerts Davis played at the Fillmore West that month and one of his first concerts in a rock venue, having performed at New York City's Fillmore East a month earlier. His change to rock venues, suggested by Columbia Records president Clive Davis, helped the label market Bitches Brew to the counterculture audience. According to Holland, the trumpeter's music around this time became well received by the rock audiences they encountered. "I heard quite recently from one of the [Grateful Dead's] ex-members that they were very nervous that they had to play up next to Miles", Holland said. "It was a time when people were not that worried about musical categories. And this was some pretty strong in-your-face music. People loved it." Davis said the Fillmore West shows were an "eye-opening experience" for him. While he became friendly with Grateful Dead frontman Jerry Garcia, who was a fan of Davis' music, there were several thousands of mostly young, white hippies who were generally unfamiliar with him. Davis recalled:

The place was packed with these real spacey, high, white people, and where we first started playing, people were walking around and talking. But after a while they all got quiet and really into the music. I played a little something like [from] Sketches of Spain and then went into the Bitches Brew shit, and that really blew them out. After that concert, every time I would play out there in San Francisco, a lot of young white people showed up at the gigs.

== Composition and performance ==
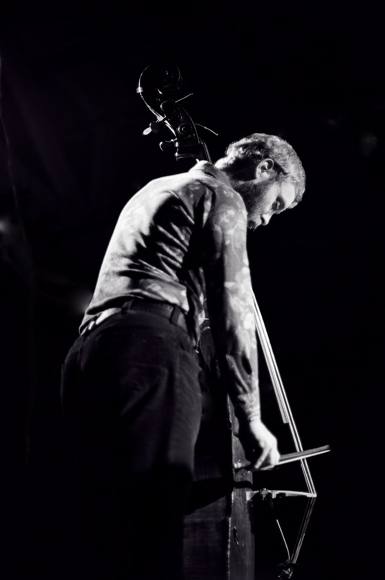
Dave Holland in 1976

The songs in the band's set list were: "Directions", "Miles Runs the Voodoo Down", "Willie Nelson", "I Fall in Love Too Easily", "Sanctuary", "It's About That Time", "Bitches Brew", "Masqualero", "Spanish Key", and "The Theme". They were performed as one continuous and uninterrupted piece of music, a practice Davis had begun in 1967. He later explained in his autobiography that performing these kinds of long musical suites without breaks allowed more space for improvisations in concert.

Most of the band's improvisations on Black Beauty centered around vamps or themes Davis introduced and restated during the performance. According to Davis scholar Paul Tingen, the record is filled with "coded phrases" he played on his trumpet to signify a change from one composition to the next. "The music would be continuous so Miles wouldn't have to speak and announce things to the audience", DeJohnette recalled. "He'd just speak with his horn and just cue the numbers by stating the front part of the melody, and then we automatically knew, which was great, because he wanted it to be a seamless kind of thing." Holland, who played both acoustic and electric bass at the show, elaborated on the tradition of using such musical signals in jazz and their use in Davis' group:

Back in the days with Louis Armstrong and King Oliver, the band would play exactly the same improvised phrase together, in unison. Nobody knew how they could do it. It was like magic. What happened was that King Oliver would play the phrase during the bars before. Louis would hear it and so when it came around the next time he would play it. I learned from Miles how these kind of cues can be used to change direction, or introduce a new section. Miles often used phrases to show us where we'd go next. When we were playing a tune, Miles would superimpose something on top of it, and as soon as he did that we'd know that we were moving to another song, or that this or that rhythmic thing was about to happen. That's the great thing about a working band, you start to develop an intuitive sense for what's going on. You're listening all the time and you build up this language which becomes very personal to the group.

According to Los Angeles Times critic Don Heckman, the resulting textures heard in Black Beauty's music exhibited "an almost pointillistic quality, with bits and pieces of sounds darting in and out of the overall texture, and Davis' trumpet skimming through the mix". In Spin, Erik Davis highlighted Grossman's "squonking sax", Corea's "nastily distorted" keyboards, and Davis' "milky, yearning, sometimes angry" trumpet playing. Because they were playing around a preceding vamp or theme when Davis signaled the next, Tingen said the musical shifts heard on the record had the effect of post-production crossfades, similar to those used by producer Teo Macero on the studio recordings In a Silent Way (1969), Bitches Brew, and Jack Johnson. Macero claimed Davis conceived his onstage approach from him: "It was because of me, because we always overlapped sections in our edits."

"Black Beauty Part IV"
A 30-second sample featuring the band's segue from "Masqualero" to "Spanish Key"

Some of the songs, including "I Fall in Love Too Easily", "Masqualero", and "The Theme", were from Davis' 1950s and 1960s repertoire. "The Theme" was originally recorded in 1955 by his first great quintet and was used to close most of his concerts from the late 1950s to 1970, after which he began to favor "Sanctuary" as a closing number. "Masqualero" was performed in a similar rock-influenced fashion as the newer material, with DeJohnette and Holland carrying aggressive vamps and Corea playing distorted riffs on his electric piano. John Szwed believed the music paid homage to Davis' past, "respecting space, solos, form, and fixed rhythms, though there are also hints throughout that [the band] will soon find some other way to organize this music to play it live." In Corea's opinion, the record was an accurate document of how this particular band of Davis' played in concert.

== Release and reception ==
Black Beauty was originally released only in Japan in 1973. It contained four side-long tracks spread across a double album, grouping the songs as medleys titled "Black Beauty Part I", "Black Beauty Part II", and so on, all of which credited Davis as the composer. He did not want the actual segments specified on the track listing out of a distaste for critics and listeners who arduously analyzed his music; according to DeJohnette's wife Lydia, "Miles really felt that critics and people spent too much time in their mental mind, analyzing and talking for hours about something that really just is." Columbia spent several years identifying some of the individual compositions to ensure royalty payment for the actual composers. The Japanese release also mistakenly credited Michael Henderson—Davis' other bassist during this period—rather than Holland in the liner notes.

Retrospective professional reviews
Review scores
Source	Rating
All Music Guide to Jazz	4/5 stars
Christgau's Consumer Guide	A−
DownBeat	3.5/5 stars
The Encyclopedia of Popular Music	4/5 stars
Entertainment Weekly	A−
Los Angeles Times	3.5/4 stars
The Penguin Guide to Jazz	3.5/4 stars
The Rolling Stone Album Guide	3/5 stars
Sputnikmusic	4/5

The record was only available in the United States as an import until 1997, when it was remastered on CD in 20-bit resolution and released by Legacy Recordings as a limited edition digipak. Robert Christgau reviewed the reissue that year in The Village Voice:

Black Beauty preserved an inkling of why the jazz-rock idea seemed so auspicious before it found form in [fusion's] flash and filigree. Wailing through 'Directions' or blasting the blues from out 'Miles Runs the Voodoo Down,' Chick Corea's keybs sound more audacious and grounded than they ever will again, with an uncommonly muscular Miles challenging his facility and fledgling soprano whiz Steve Grossman mimicking it, and beyond a few dollops of needless noodle, Jack DeJohnette keeps the troops in order, injecting more notes and accents than Ginger Baker on double amphetamines into a beat that rocks. Yet this unique sound is evolving fast. Still nominally beholden to theme-and-variation, Black Beauty is soloists' music, and as such the corniest electric Miles on record.

Davis biographer Jack Chambers was more critical, finding the sound quality and Grossman's performance poor, especially on the first disc, where he indulged in a "nervous downpour of notes that is narrow in range and unimaginative". In general, Chambers complained that the concert's largely improvised format was risky and inauspicious: "It can inspire creative bridges and emotive playing melded into a spontaneous suite or degenerate into a babble of voices bogged down in search of the musical means to get from one theme to the next." In Tingen's opinion, the quality of the mix was "substandard" and Grossman's solos sounded "nervous and shrill", but he still recommended Black Beauty as "a powerful document of an exciting phase in Miles's electric explorations, when the direction of his live performances was catching up with his studio explorations". Writing for DownBeat, John Corbett found the recording "gritty" but the grooves free and pure-sounding. Sputnikmusic's Hernan M. Campbell was more enthusiastic, deeming it "the perfect live album for not just any fan of Miles Davis, but jazz fans in general".

== Track listing ==
All compositions were credited to Miles Davis, except where noted.

=== 1973 double LP ===
Record one: Side A
No.	Title	Length
1.	"Black Beauty Part I"	23:46

Record one: Side B
No.	Title	Length
1.	"Black Beauty Part II"	18:22

Record two: Side A
No.	Title	Length
1.	"Black Beauty Part III"	17:15

Record two: Side B
No.	Title	Length
1.	"Black Beauty Part IV"	21:28

=== 1997 CD reissue ===
Disc one
No.	Title	Length
1.	"Directions" (composed by Joe Zawinul)	10:46
2.	"Miles Runs the Voodoo Down"	12:22
3.	"Willie Nelson"	6:23
4.	"I Fall in Love Too Easily" (Sammy Cahn, Jule Styne)	1:35
5.	"Sanctuary" (Wayne Shorter)	4:01
6.	"It's About That Time"	9:59

Disc two
No.	Title	Length
1.	"Bitches Brew"	12:53
2.	"Masqualero" (Shorter)	9:07
3.	"Spanish Key/The Theme"	12:14

== Personnel ==
Credits are adapted from the album's liner notes.

=== Musicians ===
- Miles Davis – trumpet
- Steve Grossman – saxophone
- Chick Corea – electric piano
- Dave Holland – electric and acoustic basses
- Jack DeJohnette – drums
- Airto Moreira – percussion

=== Technical personnel ===
==== Original ====
- Teo Macero – production
- Teruhisa Tajima, Shuichi Yoshida – cover design
- Tadayuki Naitoh – front cover photo
- Sandy Speiser – liner photos

==== Reissue ====
- Bob Belden – reissue production
- Tom Ruff – reissue mastering
- Randall Martin – reissue design
- Chick Corea – reissue liner notes

== See also ==
- 1970s in jazz
- Agharta (album)

== Bibliography ==
- Alkyer, Frank; Enright, Ed; Koransky, Jason, eds. (2007). The Miles Davis Reader. Hal Leonard Corporation. ISBN 978-1-4234-3076-6.
- Anon. (1981). Jazz Journal International.
- Campbell, Hernan M. (2012). "Review: Miles Davis – Black Beauty". Sputnikmusic.
- Chambers, Jack (1998). Milestones: The Life and Times of Miles Davis. Da Capo Press. ISBN 0-306-80849-8.
- Christgau, Robert (1997). "Miles Davis's '70s:The Excitement! The Terror!". The Village Voice. No. October 14.
- Christgau, Robert (2000). Christgau's Consumer Guide: Albums of the '90s. Macmillan. ISBN 0-312-24560-2.
- Considine, J. D. (2004). "Miles Davis". In Brackett, Nathan; Hoard, Christian (eds.). The Rolling Stone Album Guide. Simon & Schuster. ISBN 0-7432-0169-8.
- Cook, Richard; Morton, Brian (2006). The Penguin Guide to Jazz (8th ed.). Penguin Books. ISBN 0-14-102327-9.
- Corea, Chick (1997). Black Beauty: Miles Davis at Fillmore West (CD reissue liner notes). Miles Davis. Columbia/Legacy. C2K 65138.
- Davis, Erik (1997). "Freakin' the Funk – Revisiting Miles Davis's '70s Visions". Spin (August).
- Heckman, Don (1997). "Unleashing More of the Davis Legacy". Los Angeles Times. No. July 27.
- Jackson, Blair; Gans, David (2015). This Is All a Dream We Dreamed: An Oral History of the Grateful Dead. Macmillan. ISBN 978-1-250-05856-0.
- Jurek, Thom (2002). "Black Beauty: Miles Davis at Fillmore West". In Bogdanov, Vladimir; Woodstra, Chris; Erlewine, Stephen Thomas (eds.). All Music Guide to Jazz. Backbeat Books. ISBN 0-87930-717-X.
- Larkin, Colin (2011). "Miles Davis". The Encyclopedia of Popular Music (5th ed.). Omnibus Press. ISBN 978-0-85712-595-8.
- Sinclair, Tom (1997). "Miles Davis Live Albums". Entertainment Weekly (August 1): 75.
- Szwed, John (2004). So What: The Life of Miles Davis. Simon & Schuster. ISBN 0-684-85983-1.
- Tingen, Paul (2001). Miles Beyond : The Electric Explorations of Miles Davis, 1967–1991 (1st ed.). Billboard Books. ISBN 0-8230-8346-2.
