= In Concert (Miles Davis album) =

Live album by Miles Davis
- Released: May 1973
- Recorded: September 29, 1972
- Venues: Philharmonic Hall; New York City
- Genres: Jazz-funk; jazz-rock; jazz fusion
- Length: 84:06
- Label: Columbia
- Producer: Teo Macero

Miles Davis chronology
Black Beauty (1973)	In Concert (1973)	Jazz at the Plaza Vol. I (1973)

Miles Davis live chronology
The Cellar Door Sessions 1970 (1970)	In Concert (1972)	The Complete Miles Davis at Montreux (1973)

Professional ratings
Review scores
Source	Rating
AllMusic	4/5 stars
Christgau's Record Guide	A–
DownBeat	4/5 stars
The Encyclopedia of Popular Music	4/5 stars
Entertainment Weekly	A
Los Angeles Times	2/4 stars
The Rolling Stone Album Guide	3.5/5 stars
The Penguin Guide to Jazz Recordings	3/4 stars

In Concert (Note: The title of the album's original release (Columbia KG 32092) is listed as "In Concert" by Billboard, Coda, and the Schwann Record & Tape Guide.) is a live double album by the American jazz musician Miles Davis. It was recorded in 1972 at the Philharmonic Hall in New York City. Columbia Records' original release did not credit any personnel, recording date, or track listing, apart from the inner liner listing the two titles "Foot Fooler" and "Slickaphonics."

== Critical reception ==
In a contemporary review of the album, Bob Palmer of Rolling Stone magazine believed Carlos Garnett's saxophone playing sounded marginalized, but wrote that the music is "bracing, popping, at least one step ahead of the many Davis imitators. There are few real surprises, but there's a continuing skein of rhythms, themes and developments that makes fine extended listening." Robert Christgau wrote in Christgau's Record Guide: Rock Albums of the Seventies (1981) that although "it takes a while to get into gear" and is "pretty narrow in function", the album's "urban voodoo" has "more going for it rhythmically than On the Corner." In an article for The Village Voice, Christgau wrote of the album upon its reissue in 1997:

"By In Concert ... [Michael] Henderson is the sole survivor from the more talented prior band—although, crucially, Al Foster pushes like [Jack] DeJohnette with less excess motion. The result is the purest jazz-funk record ever—not as quick or tricky as James Brown, but more richly layered, riffs and drones and wah-wahs and tunelets and weird noises and shifting key centers snaking along on a sexually solicitous, subtly indomitable pulse."

According to AllMusic editor Steve Huey, "melody isn't the point of this music; it's about power, rhythm, and the sum energy of the collective, and of Davis' electric jazz-rock albums, In Concert does one of the most mind-bending jobs of living up to those ideals". Erik Davis, writing in Spin magazine, praised its "rhythmic wall of sound" and said that its music is "of such propulsive psychedelic density that it makes the heaviest P-Funk sound like the Archies." JazzTimes writer Tom Terrell called Davis "a spiritual Hendrix with his own cosmic band of gypsies", and commented that the album's "visionary performance ... predicts hip hop ('Rated X''s bassline = 'White Lines'), Ornette's Prime Time ('Black Satin') and Talking Heads ('Ife')".

In a mixed review, Don Heckman of the Los Angeles Times criticized Davis' use of the wah-wah effects controller and said that he was "not in particularly exceptional form" because he had "moved more deeply into pounding funk rhythms and fairly static sound textures." In The Rolling Stone Album Guide (2004), J. D. Considine felt that, although it was "occasionally fascinating, the busily churning rhythms often seem oddly static, as if the band were laboriously treading water."

== Track listing ==
=== Original LP ===
All tracks were composed by Miles Davis.

==== Record one - “Foot Fooler” ====
Side one
No.	Title	Length
1.	"Miles Davis in Concert"	20:45

Side two
No.	Title	Length
1.	"Miles Davis in Concert"	25:23

==== Record two - “Slickaphonics” ====
Side three
No.	Title	Length
1.	"Miles Davis in Concert"	18:12

Side four
No.	Title	Length
1.	"Miles Davis in Concert"	20:21

=== CD reissue ===
Disc one (First set - “Foot Fooler” in Concert, Parts 1 and 2)
No.	Title	Length
1.	"Rated X"	12:16
2.	"Honky Tonk"	9:18
3.	"Theme from Jack Johnson"	10:12
4.	"Black Satin/The Theme"	14:14

Disc two (Second set - “Slickaphonics” in Concert, Parts 1 and 2)
No.	Title	Length
1.	"Ife"	27:53
2.	"Right Off/The Theme"	10:30

== Personnel ==
- Miles Davis – electric trumpet with wah-wah
- Carlos Garnett – soprano and tenor saxophone
- Cedric Lawson – electric piano, synthesizer
- Reggie Lucas – electric guitar
- Khalil Balakrishna – electric sitar
- Michael Henderson – electric bass
- Al Foster – drums
- Badal Roy – tablas
- James Mtume – percussion

== Bibliography ==
- Christgau, Robert (1981). Christgau's Record Guide: Rock Albums of the Seventies. Ticknor & Fields. ISBN 0899190251.
- Considine, J. D.; et al. (November 2, 2004). Brackett, Nathan; Hoard, Christian (eds.). The New Rolling Stone Album Guide: Completely Revised and Updated 4th Edition. Simon & Schuster. ISBN 0-7432-0169-8.
- Larkin, Colin (2006). The Encyclopedia of Popular Music. Vol. 9 (4th ed.). Muze. ISBN 0195313739.
