= In Person Friday and Saturday Nights at the Blackhawk, Complete =

Box set by Miles Davis
- Released: June 3, 2003
- Recorded: April 21–22, 1961
- Venues: Black Hawk; San Francisco
- Genres: Jazz; hard bop; post-bop; modal jazz
- Length: 117:29 ("Friday"), 123:51 ("Saturday")
- Label: Columbia/Legacy
- Producers: Irving Townsend (1961); Bob Belden and Michael Cuscuna (reissue 2003)

Miles Davis live box set chronology
The Complete Miles Davis at Montreux (2002)	In Person Friday and Saturday Nights at the Blackhawk, Complete (2003)	The Cellar Door Sessions 1970 (2006)

In Person Friday and Saturday Nights at the Blackhawk, Complete, also called The Complete Blackhawk, is a 2003 four-CD boxset of the 1961 live performances of the Miles Davis Quintet at the Black Hawk nightclub in San Francisco.

== Background ==
=== Recording and composition ===
These sets, performed with recording in mind, forged new ground for jazz musician Miles Davis, who had never previously been recorded live in a club with his combo.

=== Release history ===
Material from the four sets was first released simultaneously by Columbia Records on two albums in September 1961, titled In Person Friday Night at the Blackhawk, San Francisco, Volume 1 and In Person Saturday Night at the Blackhawk, San Francisco, Volume 2. Although those albums were rereleased several times, the complete sets were not commercially available until Sony Records released a digital mastering of this collection. Simultaneous to this release, the material was made available as two separate double-albums, entitled Friday Night: In Person at the Blackhawk in San Francisco, Complete and Saturday Night: In Person at the Blackhawk in San Francisco, Complete. In conjunction with Sony, Mosaic Records released the 6 LP set.

The complete collection, which included liner notes from the original release by Monterey Jazz Festival co-founder Ralph J. Gleason as well as additional notes by jazz trumpeter Eddie Henderson, was critically and commercially well received. The collection peaked at #9 on Billboard's "Top Jazz Albums" chart.

=== Cover ===
The original 1961 albums and the 2003 complete reissues (both the 4-disc and 2-disc) displayed a photograph by Leigh Wiener of Davis with his first wife, Frances Taylor, for whom the song "Fran-Dance" was composed. The 2003 restoration of the original cover art came after a number of reissues that used a photo with an atmospheric representation of the exterior of the Black Hawk taken during Davis's performance.

== Critical reception ==
Professional ratings
Review scores
Source	Rating
AllMusic	(Vol. 1)
AllMusic	(Vol. 2)
AllMusic	4.5/5 stars
PopMatters	(positive)
The Penguin Guide to Jazz Recordings	4/4 stars
Tom Hull	A−

In its review of the four-disc compilation, The New York Times indicated that the set was "the gold standard for straight-ahead, postwar jazz rhythm". AllMusic, praising the "pristine" sound and "lovely" packaging, suggested that "no Davis fan should be without these recordings purchased separately or as a set." The All About Jazz website said that the set was "so fastidiously remastered it sounds live in your living room."

== Track listing ==
The track listing for In Person Friday and Saturday Nights at the Blackhawk, Complete reproduces in its entirety the performances of Friday and Saturday nights, April 21 and 22, 1961. Because of space constraints and a desire not to divide sets, the producers of the box set put sessions 1 and 3 together on the first disc, placing the more energetic and lengthier 2nd set on Disc Two. For the two double-disc sets, the track listing for Friday Night: In Person at the Blackhawk in San Francisco, Complete is that of Disc One and Disc Two, below. For Saturday Night: In Person at the Blackhawk in San Francisco, Complete, it is that of Disc Three and Disc Four.

=== In Person Friday and Saturday Nights at the Blackhawk, Complete track listing ===
All tracks are written by Miles Davis, except where otherwise noted.

Disc one: Friday, April 21, 1961 (first and third set)
No.	Title	Writer(s)	Length
1.	"Oleo"	Sonny Rollins	6:56
2.	"No Blues"		17:13
3.	"Bye Bye (Theme)"		2:50
4.	"If I Were a Bell"	Frank Loesser	12:43
5.	"Fran-Dance"		7:38
6.	"On Green Dolphin Street"	Bronislau Kaper; Ned Washington	12:12
7.	"The Theme"		0:44

Disc two: Friday, April 21, 1961 (second set)
No.	Title	Writer(s)	Length
1.	"All of You"	Cole Porter	15:47
2.	"Neo"		10:18
3.	"I Thought About You"	Johnny Mercer; Jimmy van Heusen	5:04
4.	"Bye Bye Blackbird"	Mort Dixon; Ray Henderson	9:46
5.	"Walkin'"	Richard Carpenter	14:16
6.	"Love, I've Found You"	Reverend C.L. Moore; Danny Small	1:54

Disc three: Saturday, April 22, 1961 (first set)
No.	Title	Writer(s)	Length
1.	"If I Were a Bell"	Loesser	12:44
2.	"So What"		12:14
3.	"No Blues"		0:27
4.	"On Green Dolphin Street"	Kaper; Washington	12:04
5.	"Walkin'"	Carpenter	12:24
6.	"'Round Midnight"	Bernie Hanighen; Thelonious Monk; Cootie Williams	7:29
7.	"Well, You Needn't"	Monk	8:02
8.	"The Theme"		0:18

Disc four: Saturday, April 22, 1961 (second and third set)
No.	Title	Writer(s)	Length
1.	"Autumn Leaves"	Joseph Kosma; Mercer; Jacques Prévert	11:45
2.	"Neo"		12:29
3.	"Two Bass Hit"	Dizzy Gillespie; John Lewis	4:36
4.	"Bye Bye (Theme)"		3:27
5.	"Love, I've Found You"	Moore; Small	1:57
6.	"I Thought About You"	Mercer; van Heusen	5:31
7.	"Some Day My Prince Will Come"	Frank Churchill; Larry Morey	9:38
8.	"Softly, as in a Morning Sunrise"	Oscar Hammerstein II; Sigmund Romberg	8:41

== Personnel ==
=== The Miles Davis Quintet ===
- Miles Davis – trumpet
- Hank Mobley – tenor saxophone
- Wynton Kelly – piano
- Paul Chambers – bass
- Jimmy Cobb – drums

=== Technical personnel ===
- Irving Townsend – producer
- Harold Chapman – engineer
- Leigh Wiener – cover photography
- Chuck Stewart – photography
- Ralph J. Gleason – liner notes
- Michael Cuscuna, Bob Belden – reissue producer
- Mark Wilder – audio remixing, audio mastering
- Eddie Henderson – reissue liner notes
