= Scritti Politti discography =

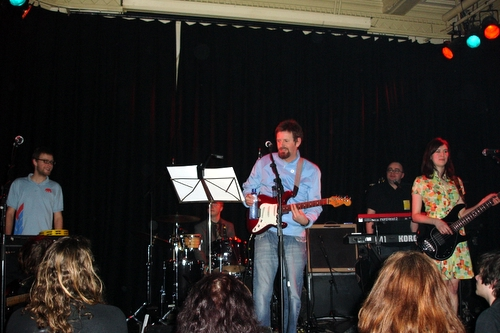
- Scritti Politti performing at Paradiso in Amsterdam, Netherlands, 2006
- Studio albums: 5
- EPs: 3
- Compilation albums: 3
- Singles: 21
- Video albums: 1

This is the discography of the British band Scritti Politti.

== Albums ==
=== Studio albums ===
| Title | Album details | Peak chart positions | | | | | | | | | Certifications |
| Title | Album details | UK | UK Indie | AUS | CAN | NL | NOR | NZ | SWE | US | Certifications |
|---|---|---|---|---|---|---|---|---|---|---|---|
| Songs to Remember | Released: 3 September 1982; Label: Rough Trade; Formats: LP, MC | 12 | 2 | — | — | — | — | 36 | — | — | |
| Cupid & Psyche 85 | Released: 10 June 1985; Label: Virgin, Warner Bros.; Formats: CD, LP, MC | 5 | — | 59 | 55 | 9 | — | 12 | 13 | 50 | BPI: Gold |
| Provision | Released: 6 June 1988; Label: Virgin, Warner Bros.; Formats: CD, LP, MC | 8 | — | 96 | — | 28 | 9 | 13 | 9 | 113 | BPI: Gold |
| Anomie & Bonhomie | Released: 26 July 1999; Label: Virgin; Formats: CD, MC, MD | 33 | — | — | — | — | — | — | 59 | — | |
| White Bread Black Beer | Released: 28 May 2006; Label: Rough Trade, Nonesuch; Formats: CD, LP | 113 | 8 | — | — | — | — | — | 43 | — | |
"—" denotes releases that did not chart or were not released in that territory.

=== Compilation albums ===
| Title | Album details |
|---|---|
| The Basics | Released: 22 May 1986; Label: Virgin; Formats: 12", MC; Japan-only mini-album |
| Early | Released: 14 February 2005; Label: Rough Trade; Formats: CD, 2xLP |
| Absolute | Released: 28 February 2011; Label: Virgin; Formats: CD |

=== Video albums ===
| Title | Album details |
|---|---|
| Scritti Politti | Released: 25 January 1986; Label: Virgin Music Video; Formats: VHS, Betamax, LaserDisc |

== EPs ==
| Title | Album details | Peak chart positions |
| Title | Album details | UK Indie |
|---|---|---|
| 4 'A Sides' | Released: November 1979; Label: Rough Trade/St. Pancras; Formats: 12" | 11 |
| 2nd Peel Session | Released: November 1979; Label: Rough Trade/St. Pancras; Formats: 7" | 13 |
| Tinseltown to the Boogiedown: Variations | Released: 1999; Label: Virgin; Formats: 2x12" | — |
"—" denotes releases that did not chart.

== Singles ==
| Title | Year | Peak chart positions | | | | | | | | | | Album |
| Title | Year | UK | UK Indie | AUS | CAN | IRE | NL | NZ | SWE | US | US Dance | Album |
|---|---|---|---|---|---|---|---|---|---|---|---|---|
| "Skank Bloc Bologna" | 1978 | — | — | — | — | — | — | — | — | — | — | Non-album single |
| "The "Sweetest Girl"" | 1981 | 64 | 3 | — | — | — | — | — | — | — | — | Songs to Remember |
| "Faithless" | 1982 | 56 | 2 | — | — | — | — | — | — | — | — | Songs to Remember |
| "Asylums in Jerusalem"/"Jacques Derrida" | 1982 | 43 | 2 | — | — | — | — | — | — | — | — | Songs to Remember |
| "Wood Beez (Pray Like Aretha Franklin)" | 1984 | 10 | — | 25 | 94 | 11 | — | 26 | — | 91 | 4 | Cupid & Psyche 85 |
| "Absolute" | 1984 | 17 | — | 77 | — | 14 | 10 | 26 | — | — | 4 | Cupid & Psyche 85 |
| "Hypnotize" | 1984 | 68 | — | — | — | — | — | — | — | — | 43 | Cupid & Psyche 85 |
| "The Word Girl" | 1985 | 6 | — | 70 | — | 12 | 18 | 18 | — | — | — | Cupid & Psyche 85 |
| "Perfect Way" | 1985 | 48 | — | 75 | 32 | — | — | — | — | 11 | 6 | Cupid & Psyche 85 |
| "Lover to Fall" (France-only release) | 1985 | — | — | — | — | — | — | — | — | — | — | Cupid & Psyche 85 |
| "Oh Patti (Don't Feel Sorry for Loverboy)" (with Miles Davis) | 1988 | 13 | — | — | — | 18 | 45 | 36 | — | — | — | Provision |
| "First Boy in This Town (Lovesick)" | 1988 | 63 | — | — | — | — | — | 40 | — | — | — | Provision |
| "Boom! There She Was" (featuring Roger Troutman) | 1988 | 55 | — | — | — | — | — | 31 | — | 53 | 12 | Provision |
| "She's a Woman" (featuring Shabba Ranks) | 1991 | 20 | — | 82 | — | — | — | — | 29 | — | — | Non-album singles |
| "Take Me in Your Arms and Love Me" (with Sweetie Irie) | 1991 | 47 | — | 113 | — | — | — | — | — | — | — | Non-album singles |
| "Tinseltown to the Boogiedown" (featuring Mos Def and Lee Majors) | 1999 | 46 | — | — | — | — | — | — | — | — | — | Anomie & Bonhomie |
| "Another Sound Mission" (with Likwit Crew) | 1999 | — | — | — | — | — | — | — | — | — | — | Non-album single |
| "The Boom Boom Bap" | 2006 | 139 | 10 | — | — | — | — | — | — | — | — | White Bread Black Beer |
| "Snow in Sun"/"Robin Hood" | 2006 | — | — | — | — | — | — | — | — | — | — | White Bread Black Beer |
| "A Day Late and a Dollar Short" (promo-only release) | 2011 | — | — | — | — | — | — | — | — | — | — | Absolute |
| "A Failed Scheme" (B-side of split single with a version of the song by Lark) | 2011 | — | — | — | — | — | — | — | — | — | — | Non-album single |
"—" denotes releases that did not chart or were not released in that territory.
