= White Bread Black Beer =

Studio album by Scritti Politti
- Released: 28 May 2006
- Recorded: 2005–2006
- Studios: Green Gartside's Home (Dalston, London)
- Genres: Art pop; avant-garde
- Length: 51:11
- Labels: Rough Trade (UK), Nonesuch (US)
- Producers: Green Gartside; Andy Houston

Scritti Politti chronology
Early (2005)	White Bread Black Beer (2006)

Singles from White Bread Black Beer
- 1. "The Boom Boom Bap" Released: 18 June 2006; 2. "Snow in Sun"/"Robin Hood" Released: 3 September 2006

White Bread Black Beer is the fifth studio album by the British pop band Scritti Politti, released in the UK on 28 May 2006 by Rough Trade Records, and in the US on 25 July 2006 by Nonesuch Records. It is effectively a solo album by the group's only permanent member, Green Gartside, as it was written and recorded at his home in Dalston in east London and he sang and played all the instruments on the album. The album was Green's first for Rough Trade since leaving them in somewhat acrimonious circumstances in 1983, following the release of Scritti Politti's debut album Songs to Remember. Since then Scritti Politti had been signed to Virgin Records and the previous three albums were known for their highly-produced sound. White Bread Black Beer marked a return to a more minimalist style.

The album was nominated for the 2006 Mercury Music Prize and has been critically regarded as one of 2006's finest, leading Gartside to perform his first worldwide gigs in almost 25 years.

== Release and promotion ==
A single, "The Boom Boom Bap", was released ahead of the album. Containing references throughout to hip-hop and ending with a recital of the titles of the tracks on Run DMC's debut album, according to Green the song is about the difference "between being in love with something and being unhealthily addicted to it". It was listed as the 412th best song of the 2000s by Pitchfork. A second double A-sided single, "Snow in Sun"/"Robin Hood", was only released as an iTunes download.

To promote the album Green embarked on his first live dates in 26 years, beginning with a low-key support slot ahead of the record's release at the Brixton Windmill on 7 January 2006. The band were billed as "Double G and the Traitorous Three", the "Traitorous Three" being his bandmates, all of whom were recruited by Green after meeting them in his local pub in Dalston. Green had suffered from stage fright since the early days of Scritti Politti, and had given up playing live after suffering a severe panic attack following a performance in 1980: he said of his return, "It was a kind of experiment to see if I would get the panic attacks again. And I didn't, so I guess I'm over it."

== Cover artwork ==
The sleeve design is based on a stitch pattern created by Green's wife Alys.

== Critical reception ==
Professional ratings
Aggregate scores
Source	Rating
Metacritic	79/100
Review scores
Source	Rating
AllMusic	4/5 stars
The Guardian	2/5 stars
The Observer	4/5 stars
Pitchfork Media	8.1/10
Q	3/5 stars
Spin	2/5 stars
Uncut	5/5 stars

Pitchfork said "The production is ambitious—soft, smooth, and spacious as ever—and Gartside's writing is consistently complex, always plotting out the classiest and most striking shifts in the chord structures and harmonies. But all this sophistication doesn't feel like some grand, expensive endeavor, like pop–soul always did in the 80s; it sounds like something that spilled privately out of Gartside's head... It's gorgeous, but it's the opposite of grand, and [...] I'm beginning to think it's one of the smartest records—musically and lyrically—we'll hear all year."

Uncut said that "White Bread Black Beer could very well be the best record of this restlessly self-critical career... What gives the record its real kick is the lure of emotional engagement... It may have taken almost 30 years of philosophical investigations, but... Green Gartside finally sounds free." Q said "engagingly rambling, there are snatches of all sorts of things here, from the Beach Boys' layered melancholy to Paul McCartney's jolly solo albums; rudimentary folk to Kraftwerk's glittering modernism... Occasionally there's a little too much going on, resulting in a few sketchy moments as the album washes pleasantly past. Overall, though, Gartside remains intriguing, still ploughing his own furrow and still coming up with the goods."

The Observer said that "White Bread Black Beer marks a welcome return to the more specific intellectual concerns of his earlier lyrics, and a simultaneous rediscovery of the pure pop sensibility which made his later, more mainstream work so addictive. The best of the songs here... might even be the work of a post-structuralist Brian Wilson." However, its sister paper The Guardian was unimpressed, feeling that White Bread Black Beer "is more flawed than masterpiece", and concluded that Green "always worked better with a creative foil. Left to his own devices, the music almost seems an afterthought and it's particularly disappointing to hear this former rhythm master turn in such pedestrian beats." Spin was also critical, describing the album as "wordy but somnambulant laptop-pop observations" and calling Green "more cryptic (and less substantial) than when he was making a name for himself in the '80s as Top 40's biggest Jacques Derrida fan".

== Track listing ==
All tracks written and composed by Green Gartside.

1. "The Boom Boom Bap" – 4:18
2. "No Fine Lines" – 1:43
3. "Snow in Sun" – 3:36
4. "Cooking" – 2:44
5. "Throw" – 3:20
6. "Dr. Abernathy" – 6:33
7. "After Six" – 2:13
8. "Petrococadollar" – 3:24
9. "E Eleventh Nuts" – 2:53
10. "Window Wide Open" – 3:12
11. "Road to No Regret" – 3:28
12. "Locked" – 4:17
13. "Mrs. Hughes" – 6:01
14. "Robin Hood" – 3:10

== Trivia ==
- The sleeve notes give thanks to David Gamson and Fred Maher, who were the other two main players within the band's line-up for both the Cupid & Psyche 85 and Provision albums (Gamson also worked on the band's fourth album, Anomie & Bonhomie).
