= Hypnotize (Scritti Politti song) =

Single by Scritti Politti

from the album Cupid & Psyche 85
- B-side: "Hypnotize (Short)"
- Released: November 1984
- Genre: Pop
- Length: 4:26 (long); 3:36 (short)
- Label: Virgin (UK); Warner Bros. (US)
- Songwriters: Green Gartside; David Gamson
- Producers: Green Gartside; David Gamson; Fred Maher

Scritti Politti singles chronology
"Absolute" (1984)	"Hypnotize" (1984)	"The Word Girl" (1985)

Music video
- "Hypnotize" on YouTube

"Hypnotize" is a song by the British pop band Scritti Politti. It was released as a single in November 1984 by Virgin Records, and would later be included on the band's second studio album Cupid & Psyche 85 (1985). It peaked at No. 68 on the UK singles chart, as well as No. 43 on the US Billboard Hot Dance/Disco chart. The music video was directed by the English director Peter Care.

== Critical reception ==
Brian Chin of Billboard described the song as "his third and most oblique comment on American funk, swinging the pendulum way back past 'Wood Beez' after the clearly pop-minded 'Absolute.'" He added, "We hope his exemplary electronic creations will find an audience here despite an apparently unreceptive radio environment." In a review of Scritti Politti's compilation album Absolute (2011), Jude Clarke of MusicOMH wrote, "Although released as a single, it failed to make much impact in the UK or US charts: a shame, as its slightly harder-edge and interesting way of playing fast-and-loose with melody and rhythm make it one of the most textured and enjoyable inclusions on this album – as it was on Cupid… back in the '80s."

== Track listing ==
12-inch single

Side A

1. "Hypnotize (Long)" – 4:26
2. "Hypnotize (Short)" – 3:36

Side B

1. "Hypnotize (Version)" – 6:32

== Personnel ==
Credits adapted from liner notes.

Scritti Politti

- Green Gartside – vocals, production
- David Gamson – keyboards, production
- Fred Maher – drums, production

Others

- Nick Moroch – guitar
- B. J. Nelson – backing vocals
- EBN (Ned Liben) – Fairlight CMI programming
- Ray Bardani – engineering
- Gary Langan – mixing

== Charts ==
Chart (1984–1985)	Peak position
UK Singles (OCC)	68
US Hot Dance/Disco (Billboard)	43
