= Dicky Moore =

- Born: 2 October 1978 (age 47); Rochford, Essex, England
- Genres: Alternative dance, electronic, nu disco, indietronica, nu folk, alternative pop
- Occupations: Guitarist, Composer
- Instruments: Vocals, guitar, synthesizer
- Years active: 1995–present
- Labels: Rough Trade; Hottwerk Records; Australopithecine Records; Too Pure
- Website: bearcraftmusic.com

Dicky Moore (born 2 October 1978) is an English, musician and composer, who plays guitar with Scritti Politti and leads the Bristol-based music collective Bearcraft.

== Scritti Politti ==
Moore joined Scritti Politti on guitar in 2005 after meeting Green Gartside in a Hackney pub opposite where he worked., and played in their first comeback gig after 26 years, under the moniker Double G and the traitorous 3 and in the following year joined them on their first American tour and for the performance of the Mercury Music Prize-nominated White Bread Black Beer. Alongside Green Gartside, Rhodri Marsden and Robert Smoughton, they have toured worldwide, including across the UK, Europe, America and Japan, and playing with artists such as Brian Wilson, Saint Etienne, Heaven 17, Manic Street Preachers, Jeffrey Lewis, and Hot Chip's Alexis Taylor.

== Bearcraft ==
Moore leads the Bristol-based music collective Bearcraft, who mix folk stories with electronic music and whose debut album, Yestreen, featuring artwork from Jessica Akerman was released on 16 August 2010 through Hottwerk Records. The follow-up album, Fabrefactions is due to be released on 4 September 2020 and was produced by Shitdisco's and Age of Consent's Joe Reeves. The album was written after Moore had received a diagnosis of acute hearing loss. Both albums are named after words which have been removed from the Oxford English Dictionary.

== Composition ==
Moore composed the score for the 2016 film Forever Tomorrow, the acclaimed ITV4 series TT Legends, which followed John McGuinness through the Isle of Man TT, and the TV series Thamesmeerd, which ran from 2016 to 2017. Moore's theme to Thamesmeerd was "a celebration of classic soaps, from the dramatic drum fill of EastEnders to Brookside's sweeping synthesizers.". Moore composes the music for the weekly podcast Sustainababble.

== Other groups ==
From 2006, Moore played guitar for Dream Themes, the London branch of Frank Sidebottom's Oh Blimey Big Band, alongside Scritti Politti bandmate Rhodri Marsden. After bandleader Chris Sievey's death, the backing band continued with the name Dream Themes, and released the 7-inch album 20 Golden Greats, which was the last release to be made by Too Pure Records before its dissolution. Moore also formed the band Scintillate in 1994, who disbanded in 2005. His only solo release was the 2007 It's About Time EP which was described as upbeat, layered, complex, and lush.
