= Early (Scritti Politti album) =

Compilation album by Scritti Politti
- Released: 14 February 2005
- Recorded: 1978–1981
- Genre: Post-punk; art pop; experimental
- Length: 47:13
- Label: Rough Trade

Scritti Politti chronology
Anomie & Bonhomie (1999)	Early (2005)	White Bread Black Beer (2006)

Early is a 2005 compilation album by the British band Scritti Politti which collects singles and EPs recorded in the first years of the band's existence, during its early incarnation as a DIY post-punk act characterised by an experimental musical approach and leftist political concerns. Following these recordings, leader Green Gartside would abandon the group's avant-garde leanings and attempt a more commercial musical direction.

== Music ==
The group's sound on these early recordings has been described by AllMusic as "scrappy, taut, and forthrightly experimental in style, utilizing abrupt changes, rhythmic displacements, and gritty and discordant harmonies tempered by Gartside's sweet vocalizing of impenetrably obscure lyrics, vaguely political in sense but temporal and abstract in meaning." Pitchfork Media characterized these songs as "what happens when you combine Marxism, art school, and post-punk London, 1979: A rickety, alien pulse, as made by a band that insisted on printing the production costs of every single on the sleeve."

Professional ratings
Review scores
Source	Rating
AllMusic	4.5/5 stars
Pitchfork Media	(7.1/10)
Rolling Stone	4/5 stars

== Track listing ==
All tracks written by Green Gartside, Nial Jinks, Keith Morley except tracks 12–13, written by Green Gartside.

No.	Title	Length
1.	"Skank Bloc Bologna"	5:53
2.	"Is and Ought the Western World"	3:46
3.	"28/8/78"	2:39
4.	"Scritlocks Door"	1:33
5.	"OPEC–Immac"	3:12
6.	"Messthetics"	1:47
7.	"Hegemony"	2:06
8.	"Bibbly-O-Tek"	3:29
9.	"Doubt Beat"	3:44
10.	"Confidence"	3:06
11.	"P.A.s"	6:00
12.	"The 'Sweetest Girl'"	5:05
13.	"Lions After Slumber"	5:00
Total length:		47:13

=== Original releases ===
- Tracks 1–3 from "Skank Bloc Bologna" single (1978)
- Tracks 4–7 from Work in Progress 2nd Peel Session (1979)
- Tracks 8–11 from 4 A Sides (1979)
- Tracks 12–13 from The "Sweetest Girl" single (1981)

== Personnel ==
=== Scritti Politti ===
- Green Gartside – vocals, guitar
- Nial Jinks – bass (tracks 1–11)
- Tom Morley – drums (tracks 1–11)

=== Additional personnel ===
- Robert Wyatt – piano (track 12)
