= Tony LeMans =

- Born: July 14, 1963
- Died: June 24, 1992 (aged 28)
- Genre: Pop/funk/R&B
- Occupations: Singer, guitarist
- Instruments: vocal, drums, keyboard
- Years active: 1989–1992
- Label: Paisley Park/Reprise/Warner Bros. Records

Tony LeMans was an American singer and songwriter, associated with Prince and signed to Prince's Paisley Park Records.

== Biography ==
Tony LeMans was born Antony L. Fortier on July 14, 1963, in Santa Monica, California, United States. He attended Will Rogers Elementary School, John Adams Junior High, Santa Monica High School and Olympic High School. It was at John Adams that he met Lenny Kravitz, who was just beginning to study music. After dropping out of Olympic High, Tony changed his surname to LeMans as a consequence of his father's love of the vehicle with that name. He then briefly worked with Kravitz on the latter's Romeo Blue project. Due to personal differences, however, they soon went their separate ways. Tony had stolen Lenny's girlfriend, but they remained friends until his death.

LeMans left Los Angeles for Minneapolis, and met Prince shortly after arriving there. Paisley Park Records released Tony's only album, the self-titled Tony LeMans in 1989. Sly Stone of Sly and the Family Stone and George Clinton of Parliament were involved in the creation as well. His album peaked at #58 on the Billboard R&B Album chart. "Higher Than High" (to which Stone contributed), "Cookie Crumbles," and "Forever More" were released as singles without much chart success. His only live performance was on New Year's Eve 1989 at San Francisco's Moscone Center with his newly formed tour band, consisting of Jamie Chezz, Kelley Kelley, Steven Menconi, T. Keanini, Michael Whitfield, and Shayne Soentpiet. Not long after, the tour was put on hold and he worked on separate projects with his producer, David Gamson of Scritti Politti. Tony co-wrote songs with Donny Osmond, as well as Eddie Murphy. Although Prince often worked behind the scenes on albums for his label, he played no official role in this one. Gamson was the main producer.

In the early 1990s, LeMans began work on a second album. Prince offered him a song called "Fuschia Light" that was intended for inclusion on the album. This album was never completed, however, due to LeMans' death. In addition to his own work, LeMans co-produced Sure Lookin' with David Gamson for Donny Osmond's comeback album Eyes Don't Lie.

LeMans, an avid motorcyclist and Harley-Davidson aficionado, died in an accident while riding in Malibu, California on June 24, 1992. He was to be married the next day to Deborah Matthews, Vanity's sister.

== Discography ==
- Tony LeMans (October 10, 1989, Paisley Park Records)
