= David Gamson =

American keyboardist/musician (born 1961)

- Born: David H Gamson; December 1961 (age 64)
- Origin: New York, U.S
- Genres: New wave; neo soul; synth-pop; blue-eyed soul; electropop; funk; R&B
- Occupations: Musician; songwriter; record producer
- Instruments: Keyboards; synthesizer
- Years active: 1981–present
- Labels: Rough Trade; Warner Bros.; Virgin; Atlantic
- Formerly of: Scritti Politti

David Gamson is an American keyboardist/musician (also a producer, songwriter, arranger, engineer). Originally hailing from New York, he has worked with, among others, Kesha, Kelly Clarkson, Jessie J, Adam Lambert, Chaka Khan, Charli XCX, Meshell Ndegeocello, Green Gartside of Scritti Politti, Sheila E., George Benson, Luther Vandross, Donny Osmond, Miles Davis, Al Jarreau, Tony LeMans, Roger Troutman, Eden xo, Quinn XCII and Hannah Diamond.

He is perhaps best known for his distinctive synthesizer work and arrangements as a member of the popular 1980s pop band Scritti Politti for three of their studio albums. Gamson co-produced, co-wrote and arranged most of the songs on three of the band's albums: Cupid & Psyche 85 (1985), Provision (1988), and Anomie & Bonhomie (1999).

== Early life ==
David Gamson was born in 1961, the son of Arnold Gamson, a conductor, composer and founder of the American Opera Society, and Annabelle Gamson (née Gold), a noted dancer and choreographer. Gamson's sister, Rosanna, is also a dancer/choreographer. He spent his infant years in Italy, where his father ran an opera company, and in the mid-1960s the family returned to the US and settled in Westchester County, New York. Growing up in a musical household, Gamson started on violin at the age of five, played in youth symphonies and attended the Manhattan School of Music’s prep program. At 13-years-old he turned to piano and began studying classical composition.

At 15, Gamson was experimenting with his first synthesizer, an ARP 2600 his father Arnold had purchased. Gamson recalled his father had "hit a wall at early thirties, which many musicians do. He took a job at the county of Westchester doing administrative work for parks and recreation, because he needed a job and had a family. But he always was, strangely, really interested in electronic music. So he enrolled in Queen's college continuing education, they had a computer music course...then he bought an ARP 2600 and a 4 track recorder. So we had that at home, and I did everything on that".

Despite his classical training, Gamson had always listened primarily to pop music - as a child to the Beatles, and in his high school years he moved on to progressive rock and the Canterbury scene (an appreciation shared by his future bandmate Green Gartside). In his late teens he became interested in funk and soul through the music of Chic, Leon Sylvers and Bootsy Collins/Parliament-Funkadelic - styles that were the primary influence on his own work as a composer, arranger and producer.

== Career ==
=== 1980–1982: First steps as an electronic musician ===
After graduating from Blind Brook High School, Gamson studied music at Sarah Lawrence College. It was there that he met Fred Maher, who would become the third member of Scritti Politti. Maher played drums in Material, an experimental NY band Gamson was fond of, and the two met through Maher's then-girlfriend, who was Gamson's classmate. Using his father's synthesizer, Gamson made a dance cover version of the Archies’ "Sugar, Sugar", and recorded a demo of the song with Maher on drums: "Well, here I was, a freshman in college...I got a job as an assistant engineer with a terrible little studio that did industrial presentations - you know, slideshows. I did a demo for ‘Sugar Sugar’ on their 16-track".

At Maher's advice, Gamson approached Michael Zilkha of the NY label ZE Records: "In those days I could actually cold call the guy who ran that label. I think he was tickled that I was calling from my dorm". Zilkha passed on "Sugar Sugar", but did fund studio time for Gamson, and introduced him to Geoff Travis, head of the UK independent label Rough Trade. "Sugar Sugar" was distributed in the US by Atlantic, under the moniker Learners Permit, and in the UK by Rough Trade. Gamson recorded another song, "No Turn On Red", for ZE records, which was included in the NME JiveWire compilation cassette, along with Scritti Politti's "Asylums in Jerusalem". That was how Gamson and Green Gartside became aware of each other's work.

Despite his success in securing funding and distribution for his music while still in his teens, Gamson was not planning a career as a pop musician: "Up until the time I got involved with Scritti Politti, I thought I was going to be a serious composer. But what bothered me about that was that serious composers really don't have an audience. I would rather communicate to a whole bunch of people. That's the reason we make music".

=== 1982–1988: Member of Scritti Politti ===
In 1982 Geoff Travis put the young Gamson in contact with one of Rough Trade's most prominent artists, Green Gartside of Scritti Politti. Gartside was then in the final stages of recording Songs to Remember, Scritti Politti's debut album. Shortly after the completion of the album he dismantled the band and was looking for a change of musical direction. Gamson assisted Gartside with arrangements for "Wood Beez (Pray Like Aretha Franklin)" and other songs, while Gartside wrote lyrics for Gamson's "Small Talk" and "L Is for Lover". The two found that they worked well together ("we were symbiotically insane about pushing each other", Gamson noted), and decided to release their collaborations as Scritti Politti, a name which already had an audience.

In 1983 Gamson and Gartside travelled to New York and met up with drummer Fred Maher, who completed the band's new lineup. The trio recorded "Small Talk" and "L Is for Lover", both produced by Nile Rodgers. However, Gartside was negotiating a new deal with a major record label, and due to the legal battle with Rough Trade, the songs were never released. Eventually, Gartside signed with Virgin Records and Warner Bros. Records. The band remained in New York and recorded three songs with producer Arif Mardin: "Wood Beez (Pray Like Aretha Franklin)", "Absolute" and "Hypnotize", all of which would become singles from their album, Cupid & Psyche 85. Gamson was still a college student at that point, and received credit for his work with Scritti Politti. The remaining tracks of the album were produced by the band members themselves - Gamson, Gartside and Maher, and recorded and mixed mostly in London.

Cupid & Psyche 85 came out in June 1985 and marked a sharp shift in Scritti Politti's style, moving from indie aesthetics to a sleek funk-induced sound, largely due to Gamson's arrangements and synth work. Gamson and Maher were not featured in the promotion for the first two singles - "Wood Beez" and "Absolute." Instead, Gartside had stand-ins playing keyboards and drums in the music videos and when appearing on Top Of The Pops. "Hypnotize" was the first video to feature all three band members, and from then on Gamson and Maher participated in videos and TV appearances. The album was a commercial and critical success, with "Wood Beez" and "The Word Girl" becoming hits in the UK, and "Perfect Way" the band's biggest hit in the US.

In addition to his work in Scritti Politti, Gamson wrote and produced for different artists, often in collaboration with Gartside or Maher. In 1985, he co-wrote and co- produced (with Maher) "When it’s Over" for Adele Bertei, with a guest vocal by Gartside. In 1986, he and Gartside co-wrote "Love of a Lifetime" for Chaka Khan, and their unreleased "L Is For Lover" became the title track for Al Jarreau’s album. All three songs had a distinctive "Scritti sound", similar to that of Cupid & Psyche 85. "It’s a double-edged sword," Gamson noted. "There were a few years when people were like ‘oh yeah give us that Scritti thing’, and then you do that, and people are like ‘that’s all he does!’ It took years to prove I could actually do some other stuff too".

After a long promotional tour for Cupid & Psyche 85, Gamson and Gartside immediately started working the band's next album, Provision, co-writing and co-producing all tracks. Recording took place in 1987–88 in London and New York. During that time Gamson wrote two songs for Luther Vandross - "Come Back" and "I Know You Want To", featured on Vandross’ album Any Love.

Scritti Politti's Provision was released in June 1988. according to Keyboard Magazine, "much of the album bears Gamson’s stamp. In fact, his handiwork shows up in virtually every aspect of the record, from programming to sequencing. His crisp, jabbing patches have a poke-in-the-ribs feel that hustles Scritti songs along, and his intricate sequences have established him as one of the most inventive architects on the current dance-pop scene".

Gamson appeared pleased with Provision at the time of its release, saying it "worked much better because Green and I developed our collaboration...I think things are much better placed on the new album...first off, it isn’t so busy". In later years he acknowledged the negative experience of making the album: "It was the most digital sounding analogue record ever made. The most anal sounding record...which is what a lot of people don’t like about it... It was one long very exhausting grind... I got physically ill at the end of that record because I was so exhausted". Commenting on the relationships within the band at that time, he said "by that point we hated each other’s guts and didn't talk to each other for ten years".

Gartside performed most of the promotion for Provision on his own: Gamson and Maher appeared in the video for the first single, "Oh Patti (Don't Feel Sorry For Loverboy)", but were absent from subsequent videos. Provision did not recreate the success of Cupid & Psyche 85 - it was a top ten hit in the UK but did not break into the US billboard top 100. It was the last album for the Gartside-Gamson-Maher incarnation of Scritti Politti.

During Gamson's time as a member of Scritti Politti, the band did not perform live. This is usually attributed to Gartside's stage fright, but Gamson had reservations of his own: When asked about his approach to arranging, he replied "I don’t think in terms of band arrangements at all. I don't think in terms of keyboard, bass, guitar and drums, because I've never experienced that... I never, ever, ever played in a band. Never, ever played live. I never wanted to be in a band. I still don't want to - not in band per se, playing live...I don't like the whole rock and roll thing. It's like an ego stroke for yourself...it's all about the group getting up and wanking themselves off. I couldn't do that without feeling silly". He repeated the sentiment nearly 30 years later, saying "I hate being onstage...I like being in the studio. The only reason I ever got into this was to make records".

=== 1988–2000: Music producer ===
Referring to his work following Scritti Politti, Gamson said "I wanted to prove myself...R&B was always my love and I wanted to do something that was a little less pop and a little more R&B". In 1988-89 he produced Tony LeMans’ debut self titled album for Prince’s Paisley Park Records. According to Green Gartside, he and Gamson started working together with LeMans, but Gartside left the project and went into semi-retirement in Wales. Green's voice can be heard during the chorus of the song Itchin' To Be. Gamson and LeMans went on to write and produce songs for Donny Osmond’s 1990 comeback album Eyes Don't Lie.

In 1990 Gamson became a staff producer and A&R at Warner Bros Records. While at Warner Gamson produced Roger Troutman’s 1991 album Bridging the Gap. This was their second collaboration, as Troutman previously contributed to two tracks on Provision. Gamson described Troutman’s trademark use of the talk box as "magic". Gamson also returned to work with Chaka Khan, producing the hit "Love You All My Lifetime" for Khan's 1992 album The Woman I Am. He then was involved in producing her follow-up album Dare You To Love Me, but Warner decided to shelve the album, and the Gamson-produced tracks found their way onto different projects - "Pain" was included on the soundtrack for Living Single, "Love Me Still" on the Clockers soundtrack, and "Never Miss The Water" on Chaka Khan's 1996 greatest hits compilation. Some of Gamson's other work at Warner included co-writing and producing "Droppin’ Like Flies" for Sheila E’s 1991 album Sex Cymbal; co-writing and producing "I’ll Be Good To You" for George Benson’s 1993 album Love Remembers and re-cutting the song "Dreamweaver" for the Wayne’s World soundtrack. "It really appealed to me, that history of staff producers", Gamson said of his role in the company. "I always have mixed feelings about it, if you were on staff, a lot of times you were the guy that had to fix stuff that was broken, which usually, those are unfixable. Even with my overblown idea of what I could achieve".

Gamson's most significant collaboration during his time at Warner was with Meshell Ndegeocello: They had met at a showcase shortly after Ndegeocello was signed to Warner-owned label Maverick. "She is kind of an old soul", Gamson said of Ndegeocello, "and I was at that time really into the soul records of the seventies and recreating that sound. we were on the same page artistically and sonically. I was trying to limit the sonic palate after all the synths...working with her was really enjoyable. It was more the producer head in terms of ‘let me get into her head and see what she's trying to do’, subverting your own aesthetic in some ways. It was fun".

Gamson produced Ndegeocello's first two albums - Plantation Lullabies (1993) and Peace Beyond Passion (1996) - both Grammy nominated. Their joint work was interrupted by Maverick management, who wanted Ndegeocello to take on a more commercial direction. Gamson only produced the vocals for her third album, Bitter, and did not go on to produce the full album. Bitter did not meet the record company's commercial expectations, and the Gamson-produced Peace Beyond Passion remains Ndegeocello's best selling album to date. Ndegeocello has said that "Gamson made me a better artist and a better musician".

In 1996 Gamson left Warner and became an independent producer. The following year, Green Gartside resurfaced from his exile in Wales with new material, and reached out to Gamson in an attempt to mend their professional and personal relationship. The two met in London where Gamson agreed to produce Scritti Politti's new album. On Anomie & Bonhomie, Scritti Politti's fourth album (and third with Gamson on board), Gartside felt that the two needed to be "on opposite sides of the glass", leaving Gamson with all producing duties and himself as the sole songwriter. Gamson brought in musicians he had previously collaborated with, including Meshell Ndegeocello, Wendy Melvoin and Paul Riser, and recording took place in LA and New York. "There was no big drama"’ said Gamson on producing the album. "There was no pressure to follow anything... it could be anything it wanted to be". Anomie & Bonhomie largely eschewed the synth-heavy sound of Cupid & Psyche 85 and Provision, and included strong hip hop and grunge influences. Upon its release, Gamson said of the album "I do feel like this record, more than the other two, is really Green's vision...Personally I think it's totally weird, and I have no idea where it fits in. But I don't think Green cares about that". Despite positive reviews, Anomie & Bonhomie was not a commercial success, and Gartside went on a second long hiatus.

=== 2000–present: Return to songwriting ===
In 2000 Gamson participated in scoring the film Mission: Impossible 2 as part of Hans Zimmer's team. In 2001 he composed "Sunny Hours" by the Long Beach Dub Allstars featuring will.i.am. During that time Gamson saw a need to adapt to the changing music business and started focusing on composing songs, which became more lucrative than production. He continued to produce for most of the artists he wrote for.

In 2007, Gamson was approached by Kesha Sebert and her mother Pebe. At that time Kesha had no contract with a major record label and was estranged from Dr Luke who had signed her to his label. Kesha and Gamson developed her song drafts which were initially guitar-based, and created a synth-heavy sound which "wasn’t a million miles away from Scritti Politti". This became the predominant sound of Kesha's first two albums. Ultimately Kesha was signed to Sony and three of Gamson's co-written and produced songs made their way to her debut album Animal + Cannibal: "Stephen", "Backstabber" and "C U Next Tuesday". Kesha told Rolling Stone that "Stephen" was one of her favorite tracks, and that Gamson "...does all the keyboard stuff, he's amazing, a crazy cynical genius guy".

In the following years, Gamson wrote and produced for various artists, among them Adam Lambert and Le Concorde. In 2011, a Scritti Politti greatest hits compilation titled Absolute was released, featuring two new songs - "Day Late and a Dollar Short" and "A Place We Both Belong" - co-written by Gamson and Gartside in their first songwriting collaboration in over 20 years.

Gamson found further success as a songwriter in 2012, with the release of Kelly Clarkson’s "Stronger (What Doesn’t Kill You)". The song was originally written in 2010 by Gamson, Jörgen Elofsson, Ali Tamposi, and offered to Leona Lewis who turned it down. After some additional writing and a new arrangement by Greg Kurstin, "Stronger" was recorded by Clarkson and went on to top 23 international charts. Gamson was nominated for a Grammy in the Song of the Year category.

The success of "Stronger" brought on a resurgence in Gamson's career, and in the years following he wrote and produced for Jessie J, LP and Charli XCX. A.G Cook, Charli XCX's creative director who was not yet born when Cupid & Psyche 85 and Provision came out, collaborated with Gamson in writing and producing the track "Femmebot", and singled out Scritti Politti as an example for "extreme pop music".

== Style and influence ==
Gamson's most influential work is his production, synth programming and arrangements on the Scritti Politti albums of the 1980s. Inspired by their contemporaries The System, D Train and Kashif, the band created a unique fusion of funk and electropop, with their distinctive sound carrying through to Gamson's independent projects. Gamson's work is characterised by timbral synth voicing and arrangements, and use of counterpoint. A column in Vinyl Me Please describes his work as "fast-paced and packed with techniques known for accomplishing clear sonic pronunciation, such as hocketing and counterpoint. It avoids melodic stasis by hurdling between distant keys, shifting between the verses and choruses".

Gamson is credited for using over 10 different synthesizers on Cupid & Psyche 85, and has noted that Scritti Politti's motto was "machines groove better than humans", causing the band to discard most live instrument recordings on both Cupid & Psyche 85 and Provision. AllMusic described Cupid & Psyche 85 as "a landmark album in many respects. No prior pop album had integrated the techniques of sampling and sequencing to such a great degree, and the technology of that time was both expensive to use and barely up to the task Scritti Politti demanded of it. Not many albums from smack in the middle of the ‘Big '80s’ can be said to possess the quality of timelessness, but Cupid & Psyche 85 most certainly does".

Artists who cite Scritti Politti as an influence include Kurt Feldman of The Pains of Being Pure at Heart, Kylie Minogue, Max Tundra, A.G Cook and The 1975. Elton John said that he purchases a copy of Cupid & Psyche 85 whenever he sees it in order to share it with other people. David Bowie described the song "Wood Beez (Pray Like Aretha Franklin)" as a "glistening beauty... The upside of the 80s". Perhaps the most well-known Scritti Politti enthusiast was Miles Davis, who covered "Perfect Way" on his 1986 Album Tutu and played a solo on Provision's "Oh Patti (Don’t Feel Sorry for Loverboy)".

In the 1990s, Gamson played a role in the rise of the neo soul genre, mainly through his work with Meshell Ndegeocello. He has contributed to other notable neo soul albums of that era, playing on Maxwell’s Urban Hang Suite and composing and playing on Angie Stone’s Black Diamond.
