= Bestival 2006 =

Music festival on the Isle of Wight

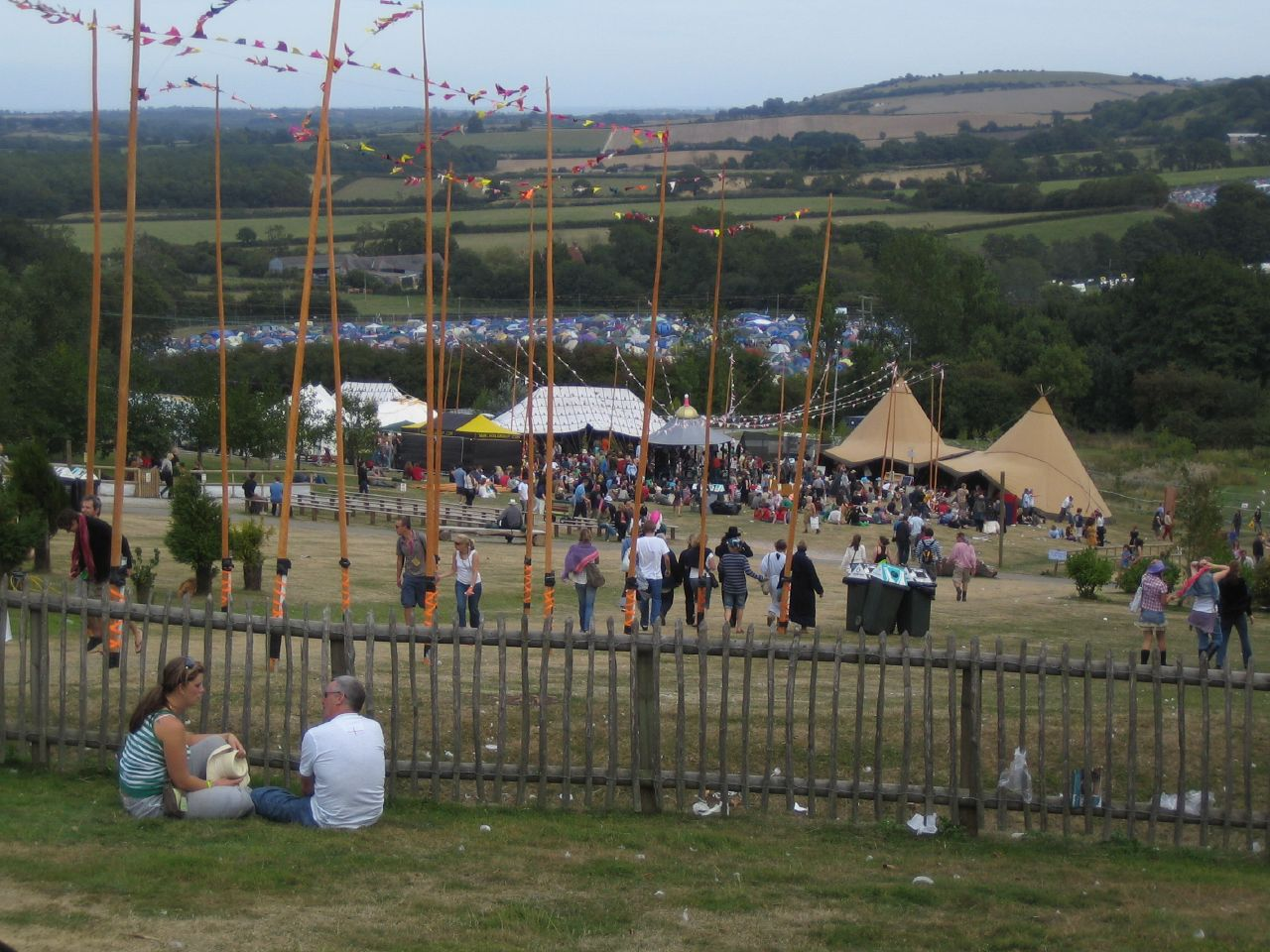
The view over the site.

Bestival 2006 was the third annual Bestival organised by the Rob da Bank's Sunday Best label. It was held at Robin Hill Country Park on the Isle of Wight from 8 to 10 September. Around 17,000 people attended the three-day event. The Bestival is often referred to as a "mini-Glastonbury" with regards to the excellent atmosphere the festival generates.

Bestival 2006 had a distinct sense of environmental and social consciousness. Indeed, the Bestival is one of the most ethically aware of the UK popular music festivals. This is reflected in the eclectic crowd it attracts and the vast array of fancy dress displayed at the 2006 event, including a Jimi Hendrix complete with guitar and amplifier, as well as a Viking Longboat with crew.

Bestival 2006 won Best Medium to Large Festival at the UK Festival Awards.

There were fourteen musical venues at the Bestival 2006. These were - Main Stage, The Big Top, The New Bollywood Bar, The Blue Pavilion, Southern Comfort Fat Tuesday, Rock 'n' Roll Tent, Come Dancing, Hidden Disco, Bandstand, Sense 3D Area, Xbox Lost and Sound, The Guardian Lounge, Loose Tea Tent, Studio 3.

An album was released containing various Bestival tracks since its inauguration in 2004. The Bestival Bugle was a 2006 single sheet newsreel distributed every day throughout the festival, containing Bestival information, tips and comic features. Bestival Radio (87.7 FM) was also established in order to give Bestival goers a live tab on action of the event.

== 2006 Festival ==
Organisers Sunday Best joking dubbed the festival as, "the festival of the year (because Glastonbury was not on this year)". Notable performances included the Scissor Sisters, The Stranglers, Gogol Bordello, FAT Samba and Youngblood Brass Band.

The Scissor Sisters widely recognised as the best act of the weekend were inspirational using dry ice, strobe lighting, paper streamers and shooting various stage items onto the crowd to impress the crowd into submission. Witty conversation, Fantastic showmanship and a euphoric audience reception were some of the ingredients of the dish of the day.

The Stranglers drew upon their back catalogue and a large audience all singing to the tunes of Golden Brown and Peaches amongst others. Fat Samba drew on a large crowd as they led the fancy dress parade, utilising tight drumming and eccentric costumes. Gogol Bordello presented themselves as eccentric and innovative, with lead singer Eugene Hutz being reminiscent of Freddie Mercury on stage. Youngblood Brass Band dazed the crowd with their no nonsense, get on stage and perform attitude. The unusual mix of trombones, trumpets, drummers, a tuba player and a rapper/snare drummer, the band performed an energetic set got the crowd jumping and dancing.

== Clown controversy ==
The stilted clowns who appeared towards the end of Scissor Sisters' set

Following on from 2005's dressing attempt, the organisers of the festival decided to make this year's theme the circus and to have everyone dressed as clowns. On 8 July 2006, it was announced that this had been scrapped as festival-goers asked for refunds as they were scared of clowns.

The Scissor Sisters opened their set dressed in clown costumes, singer Ana Matronic joking "Sorry guys, we didn't get the memo."

== Line Up ==
=== Main Stage ===
==== Friday ====
- Gogol Bordello
- Mystery Jets
- Mark Ronson
- The Fall
- Cagedbaby
- The Sunshine Underground
- Barry Peters Halifax Hospital Radio
- James Yorkston and The Athletes

==== Saturday ====
- Pet Shop Boys
- Guillemots
- Rachid Tara Ban with Brian Eno
- Kid Creole & The Coconuts
- The Cuban Brothers
- Lily Allen
- Man-Machine
- Kanda Bongo Man
- John Martyn
- Kitty Daisy & Lewis
- King Creosote

==== Sunday ====
- Scissor Sisters
- Amadou & Mariam
- Devendra Banhart
- Hot Chip
- The Stranglers
- The Young Knives
- Tunng
- The Hat
- The Aliens
- Jegsy Dodd

=== Other Stages ===
==== Friday ====
- Get Cape. Wear Cape. Fly
- Klaxons
- Jamie T
- Annie Mac
- DJ Yoda
- Scritti Politti
- iLiKETRAiNS

==== Saturday ====
- Nizlopi
- The Pipettes

==== Sunday ====
- Planet Pendulum
- Jim Noir
- Rob da Bank
