= C81 (album) =

Compilation album by NME
- Released: January 1981
- Genre: Post-punk
- Length: 79:39
- Labels: Rough Trade; New Musical Express

NME chronology
C81 (1981)	Jive Wire (1982)

C81 was a cassette compiled for the British music paper NME in 1981 (hence (C)assette 81) and released in conjunction with the record label Rough Trade. Featuring a number of contemporary musical acts and performers, it was intended to mark the first five years of the independent label movement in the UK record industry and Rough Trade itself. It was the first in a series of many cassette releases from the paper, including the C86 compilation of 1986.

== Background ==
C81 was compiled by NME journalist Roy Carr, and Christopher Rose, who worked in public relations for Rough Trade. To obtain a copy, NME readers needed to collect two coupons from the magazine and send off £1.50. The first printed coupons and advertisement for the cassette were in the issue dated 31 January 1981. By the time C81 went on general sale at the end of May that year, 25,500 copies had been sold through the coupon offer, which represented a "big commercial success" according to Carr.

The tape contained a set of 25 diverse tracks ranging from post-punk (Red Crayola, Essential Logic, D.A.F., the Raincoats), jazz (James Blood Ulmer), poetry (John Cooper Clarke), ska (the Beat), electronic (Cabaret Voltaire) to veteran 'Canterbury scene' performer Robert Wyatt. It was accompanied by the C81 Owner's Manual, a 32-page booklet of lyrics and artwork that readers would assemble themselves by cutting up and folding a page from the tabloid sized magazine. This consisted of 16 small double sided panels, and was designed to be slipped into the cassette case. A running joke throughout the booklet was the comparison of a number of acts on the tape to various periods in the history of the Velvet Underground.

When C81 went on general sale in May 1981, Chrysalis Records refused to re-licence the tracks by the Specials and Linx, and these were then replaced by Panther Burns and Television Personalities.

Publishing a tape was an acknowledgment of the flourishing self-published cassette culture of the time that the NME had been supporting during its short-lived Garageland column. An alternative view, however, was that the C81 cassette was more akin to 'bandwagon jumping', drawing on the enthusiasm and momentum of the cassette culture movement and using this as a promotional tool, whilst failing to acknowledge that movement, and ignoring its inherent critique of the established music industry. British music writer Simon Reynolds called it "post punk's swan song", noting the appearance of three acts from Scottish independent label Postcard Records and the emerging new pop tendency of bands such as Linx and Scritti Politti, and that NME stopped publishing the Garageland column in the very same month that C81 went on general sale, an acknowledgement that the DIY cassette culture movement was on the wane.

== Track listing ==
=== Side one ===
1. "The "Sweetest Girl"" – Scritti Politti (6:09)
2. "Twist and Crawl Dub" – The Beat (4:58)
3. "Misery Goats" – Pere Ubu (2:26)
4. "7,000 Names of Wah!" – Wah! Heat (3:57)
5. "Blue Boy" – Orange Juice (2:52)
6. "Raising the Count" – Cabaret Voltaire (3:32)
7. "Kebab-Träume (Live)" – Deutsch Amerikanische Freundschaft (3:50)
8. "Bare Pork" – Furious Pig (1:28)
9. "Raquel" – The Specials (1:51) (replaced by "Bourgeois Blues" by Panther Burns on reissued version)
10. "I Look Alone" – Buzzcocks (3:00)
11. "Fanfare in the Garden" – Essential Logic (3:00)
12. "Born Again Cretin" – Robert Wyatt (3:07)

=== Side two ===
1. "Shouting Out Loud" – The Raincoats (3:19)
2. "Endless Soul" – Josef K (2:27)
3. "Low Profile" – Blue Orchids (3:47)
4. "Red Nettle" – Virgin Prunes (2:13)
5. "We Could Send Letters" – Aztec Camera (4:57)
6. "Milkmaid" – Red Crayola (2:01)
7. "Don't Get in My Way" – Linx (5:15) (replaced by "Magnificent Dreams" by Television Personalities on reissued version)
8. "The Day My Pad Went Mad" – The Massed Carnaby St John Cooper Clarke (1:46)
9. "Jazz Is the Teacher, Funk Is the Preacher" – James Blood Ulmer (4:03)
10. "Close to Home" – Ian Dury (4:13)
11. "Greener Grass" – Gist (2:32)
12. "Parallel Lines" – Subway Sect (2:38)
13. "81 Minutes" – John Cooper Clarke (0:13)

== See also ==
- DIY punk ethic
- Fanzine
