= Songs to Remember =

Studio album by Scritti Politti
- Released: 3 September 1982
- Recorded: late 1980–August 1981
- Studio: Berry Street Studio (London); Island Studios (London)
- Genre: Pop; new wave; blue-eyed soul
- Length: 43:40
- Label: Rough Trade
- Producer: Adam Kidron; Green Gartside

Scritti Politti chronology
4 A-Sides (1979)	Songs to Remember (1982)	Cupid & Psyche 85 (1985)

Singles from Songs to Remember
- 1. "The "Sweetest Girl"" Released: 9 October 1981; 2. "Faithless" Released: 16 April 1982; 3. "Asylums in Jerusalem"/"Jacques Derrida" Released: 23 July 1982

Songs to Remember is the debut studio album by the British pop band Scritti Politti. The album's recording had to be delayed for nine months due to frontman Green Gartside's collapse and illness, and then after completion its release was delayed for a further year at the band's request. It was eventually released on 3 September 1982 by Rough Trade Records, peaking at number 12 on the UK Albums Chart. The album was heavily influenced by disco, reggae, and soul music, and marked the beginning of Scritti Politti's move from their underground DIY post-punk sound towards commercial pop music.

British music magazine Record Mirror placed it at number 14 in their critics' list of the best albums of the 1980s, and it was included in journalist Garry Mulholland's book Fear of Music: The 261 Greatest Albums Since Punk and Disco (2006) where he described the record as "a unique and modestly epic fusion of pop, reggae, funk, soul, jazz and lyrics submerged in the deep end of political philosophy."

== Background ==
After releasing two EPs and a single, Scritti Politti began planning their debut studio album in 1979, but the recording had to be delayed when Gartside collapsed after a gig supporting post-punk band Gang of Four in Brighton in early 1980. Originally believed to be a heart attack, the cause of his collapse was eventually diagnosed as a panic attack, brought on by his chronic stage fright and his unhealthy lifestyle. Returning home to south Wales at his parents' insistence for a nine-month convalescence period, Gartside had plenty of time to think about the direction the band and their music were going in. During 1979 he had already become less interested in the independent music and punk scene and had started listening to and buying American funk and disco like Chic and the Jacksons, Stax soul like Aretha Franklin, and 1960s British beat music such as the Beatles' early records. Gartside came to the conclusion that "you don't have to be lobotomised in order to make pop music. It's a real passion to make it" and that making pop music did not mean selling out punk's principles or dumbing down: "I think the politics of punk does survive. There are a whole lot [of] people who aren't happy to make pap but want to make pop. They understand that what sells means something. It finds a way into people's hearts in a way that independent music never did." He explained his reasons for abandoning the band's original "do-it-yourself" philosophy to Smash Hits in November 1981:

"In simple terms, we were sick to death of the ghetto of the independent scene. The Garageland (Note: Garageland was a column in the NME covering the latest developments and releases in the independent music scene, particularly records and cassettes that were self-financed recordings and only available by mail order. Originally started in August 1980, the column was discontinued less than ten months later in May 1981 due to lack of interest and the acknowledgement that the fashion for the "do it yourself" ethic in music had passed. Gartside's referral to "the Garageland sections of the music papers" was therefore meant as a description of the DIY independent music scene in general.) sections of the music papers became more and more closeted with more and more people sitting in their bedrooms making cassettes and swopping them with other people making cassettes. There were more and more silly names and it began to smack more and more of 'hippy-ness'. It had become an ageing alternative that was never going to present a route for people who wanted to make their music on a wide scale. We never particularly wanted to become a cult group, but the music was very marginal and we were – perhaps rightly – stereotyped as intellectuals."

As well as his musical change of heart, Gartside had also abandoned the strict Marxist philosophy of the early Scritti Politti ideas and recordings, saying that "a lot of the very oppositional politics that we'd been involved in lost their appeal and credibility for me. I rejected the principles of that, what was monolithical Marxism. I no longer supported the mechanism which held that up, and carried over to the music. Plus I was bored shitless with the noise we were making."

Before his collapse Gartside had already broached the concept of taking the group in a more commercial pop direction with his band mates. His ideas did not go down well with them, as he recounted in an interview for Jamming! fanzine in June 1982:

"In 1980 I spent nine months in Wales, and the reason I went away was not just because I was sick, but also because there was a bit of dissension in the group about me. I wanted to go very poppy, but Tom [Morley, drummer] and Nial [Jinks, bassist] weren't very keen on the idea, so in coordinance with the old bookwormish Scritti Politti I decided to make some notes – which in retrospect is a ridiculous thing to do – about the theory and politics of it, and why it was a good thing to do, as opposed to keep slogging away at St. Pancras Records [Scritti Politti's self-financed independent record label]. So I went away and wrote an enormous amount of stuff for them as well. I ended up saying, 'Right, from now on when I've got a number of songs I want to do, then if you want to play on them, that's great; if you don't, lets forget the whole thing'. That was the basic shift of footing, that I wasn't prepared to go to the lengths of all that intellectualising to justify the songs – it was crazy."

Although both initially stayed with the group to play on the album, Jinks left Scritti Politti shortly after the record's completion in 1981. Morley decided to stay with the group even though his drumming was becoming replaced more frequently by programmed drum machines, but he was eventually sidelined and left the group in November 1982.

== Recording ==
On his recovery from illness Gartside returned to London and went straight into the studio with the group to begin recording the album at the end of 1980. It was recorded at Berry Street Studio in London, with the exception of "Faithless" which was recorded at Island Studios (since renamed Sarm Studios). The band were able to take their time with the recording and to employ guest musicians including Mike McEvoy and Joe Cang because their label Rough Trade paid each member a salary of £50 per week, as well as giving them a generous advance to record the album. Gartside explained that the album had taken several months to make because "a lot of the ideas for this album, particularly lyrically, weren't finalised by the time we went into the studio, so we decided to do a couple of days at a time. Also, we were working with Adam Kidron, who was at the time committed to Delta Five [sic] and Pere Ubu and Orange Juice, so it took that much longer to complete. Plus the fact that there's quite a few other musicians playing on it, many of whom could only work two hour schedules."

Gartside told NME that he had originally planned to call the album Stand and Deliver before Adam and the Ants released their chart-topping single of the same name, and then Junior Gichi before realising that the name could be confused with that of the singer Junior Giscombe, a backing vocalist for the Brit funk band Linx who was just beginning a solo career in 1982.

== Release and promotion ==
The first song to be released from the album was "The 'Sweetest Girl'", described by Gartside ahead of its release as "a perversion and an extension of lovers rock". It was first made available in January 1981 when it was included as the opening track on the C81 cassette compiled by the NME. A German import single of the song arrived in the UK in August 1981 but was quickly withdrawn at the band's request, as they were unhappy with both the mix and the vinyl pressing. "The 'Sweetest Girl'" finally received a full release as a single on 9 October 1981. The single versions of "The 'Sweetest Girl'" and its B-side "Lions After Slumber" are both different from the versions that later appeared on Songs to Remember.

The album was preceded by two more singles, "Faithless" and the double A-side "Asylums in Jerusalem"/"Jacques Derrida". The cover artwork for each of the singles was a homage to the packaging of a luxury consumer item: Dunhill cigarettes for "The 'Sweetest Girl'", Dior's Eau Sauvage perfume for "Faithless", and Courvoisier cognac for "Asylums in Jerusalem"/"Jacques Derrida". Gartside claimed that the idea behind the singles' sleeves was to "convey a sense of a common, available thing which is classy, like our records now".

Although the album was completed in August 1981, its release was delayed for a whole year until the group felt ready to release it. Gartside defended the decision to hold back the album, saying that "we could have released it then, and it would probably have got some nice reviews, sold a few thousand copies and disappeared. But we thought that if we held on to it, put out 'The "Sweetest Girl"', built on that a bit, took some more singles off the album, built up the interest and then put it out, it would do a lot more. Seeing as we were really pleased with it, I would much rather that happened."

Songs to Remember was finally released in September 1982. In several interviews at the time of the album's release, Gartside stated his dissatisfaction with Rough Trade's promotion of the record, hinting in one interview that "there's still a lot of problems, as far as I'm concerned, fundamental matters of distribution and economics, promotion, marketing and a bias against their product at radio stations" and in another he complained, "I must say I've been badly disappointed the way RT have handled the past three singles. I dunno, but when you really need that boost, they can't give it to you ... I'd like to see it generally happen with RT. But we'll have to see the way they handle the LP."

The album was first released on CD in 1986. A remastered version was released in October 2001 by Virgin Records. A newer remastered version is due to be released in April 2026 by Rough Trade.

== Writing and composition ==
Gartside's change in beliefs directly affected the music and particularly the lyrics of Songs to Remember. In one interview with NME in October 1981 he told the paper, "The politics have moved from an essentialist and reductionist position in which we believed in a history of science which could make sense of the future to one that realized that what you've got is needs, demands, and desires, and you go out and you fight for them. Which means that your music will at points be indexed fairly clearly to Politics with a big 'P' and at other points will cut across it completely." In another interview with The Face the following year Gartside said, "My loss has been political conviction, the idea of a correct understanding of the past, present and future (Marxism). I've always been obsessively concerned that my understanding of political truth should be scientifically grounded. Many songs [on the album] are about what happens when the anchor points of political, moral or religious understanding fall away." For example, he stated that the track "Faithless" was about "how living without faith brings you both happiness and sadness. I've never had any religion, except maybe politics, although I am interested in having some means of achieving social order and progress."

The result of these changes was that the lyrics on the album moved away from the overtly political lyrics of the early Scritti Politti EPs towards those that explored linguistics as a means of expressing personal politics and deconstructing the traditional love song. As Gartside explained, "The problematic of language is present on the LP as an essential filter to each of the songs, dealing as most of them do with love and sexuality". He described "The 'Sweetest Girl'" as "the tendency for things to fall apart in the light of political awareness", or as he put it more directly in another interview, "It's got a lot to do with the promise and the myth and the cliché of the sweetest girl", or how the male idealised vision of the perfect girl was a myth, hence the inverted commas around the song's title (a subject and a grammatical trick he would later return to on the 1985 single "The Word 'Girl'"). The song also alludes to "the sickest group in all the world", which Gartside would later admit referred to the former bandmates and collaborators he had jettisoned from the early squat-punk collective days of Scritti Politti: "We were a sick group for some time. I used to read and write a lot, which was the only thing I did apart from being debauched ... we were always pretty poorly".

References to famous philosophers, another of Gartside's favourite subjects, recur throughout the album, most obviously on the track "Jacques Derrida", named after the poststructuralist philosopher whom Gartside eventually met in 1988. Speaking about the song Gartside said, "It's about how powerful and contradictory the politics of desire are. About being torn between all things glamorous and reactionary and all things glamorous and leftist. Then in the rap it dispenses with both in favour of desire." "Asylums in Jerusalem" was inspired by the writings of Friedrich Nietzsche and tells of the vast madhouses built around ancient Jerusalem to house the large numbers of desert-dwelling locust-eating religious fanatics who sprang up claiming to be "prophets" in the wake of Jesus's arrival. Gartside also references philosopher Ludwig Wittgenstein with the line "it's true like the Tractatus" in the song "Gettin' Havin' & Holdin'"—the joke being that according to the picture theory of language Wittgenstein developed in the Tractatus, the concept of "truth" does not exist.

The last line in the song "Lions After Slumber" ("like lions after slumber in unvanquishable number") is taken from Shelley's 1819 poem The Masque of Anarchy which describes the Peterloo Massacre and has since been held up as a political poem signifying peaceful resistance.

The lines "He held it like a cigarette behind a squaddie's back, he held it so he hid its length and so he hid its lack" in "Jacques Derrida" have nothing to do with the rest of the song, but refer to Gartside's remembrances of observing old men urinating in the toilets of the folk clubs he used to frequent as a young man: "They had a way of holding their cocks while they were pissing. I found that fascinating."

== Artwork ==
The album cover was plain white, with the handwritten artist name and album title separated by a dark blue horizontal line. Early editions of the vinyl LP were embossed with a pictogram of an insect inside a circle in the bottom right corner. On the CD and later versions of the vinyl album this pictogram was printed onto the album cover.

== Critical reception ==
Professional ratings
Review scores
Source	Rating
AllMusic	3/5 stars
Christgau's Record Guide	B
Pitchfork	7.6/10
Q	4/5 stars
Record Mirror	4/5 stars
The Rolling Stone Album Guide	4/5 stars
Smash Hits	7 1/2/10
Sounds	5/5 stars
Spin Alternative Record Guide	8/10
Uncut	8/10

Songs to Remember received a favourable reception from the UK music press on its release. Melody Maker stated that "Green's determination to stamp his brandmark into the nation's consciousness is reflected by the album's pompous title ... Yet the funny thing is those dubious proclamations just aren't needed because the arrogance embodied in the title is emphatically based on vinyl reality ... Some people may find Green's sugary vocals and Adam Kidron's lush production just a little too refined; listening to Scritti can be a bit like having honey tipped down your ears, but that seems like a perfect design for mainstream invasion. If justice prevailed Songs to Remember would be number one across the globe ... You'd have to go back a long way to find a better pop record than this – back to the Sixties probably." NME noted that many of the album's nine tracks had already appeared in some form on the singles, and described Songs to Remember as "Scritti Politti's greatest hits", and said that the unfinished nature of the tracks made them "sound like ideas about songs", rather than songs themselves. It continued, "It's by no means a disturbing record to listen to, which is why it could appeal to the timid, but Green's lyrical preoccupations – language, definitions, the way one's preconceptions determine and control perception – would intrigue the curious ... Songs to Remember is witty, ingenious, likeable and probably in the public interest ... All this notwithstanding, there is something missing; a certain solidity, perhaps." Smash Hits felt that "the two years it took to make may have blunted its impact somewhat" but "there's more than enough in Songs to Remember to establish Scritti Politti as the acceptable face of intellectual pop."

AllMusic described Songs to Remember as "a rather scatterbrained record. Sometimes it sounds like T. Rex in miniature form ("Jacques Derrida"); sometimes it sounds like wannabe Dirty Mind-era Prince ("Sex"); sometimes it sounds like wannabe Young Americans-era David Bowie ("A Slow Soul")" but also that "there are moments of full-on glory that aren't sunk in their influences ... In sum, there's as much to love as there is to skip." Reviewing the 2001 reissue, Q said, "This is trademark Scritti Politti from the start, all unlikely musical fusions (vocoder-gospel, anyone?), lilting melodies, winsome wit and wonderful invention ... [it] sounds as delightfully undateable as it did back in 1982 ...Songs to Remember remains a well-named, well-made record". Mojo said that Scritti Politti had "valiantly spot-welded such rarified tropes [as Derrida and digital dancehall] to an unsuspecting pop chassis ... Lovers Rock and Left Bank intellectualism have rarely combined more fruitfully."

=== Accolades and legacy ===
Songs to Remember was included as one of Sounds top 20 albums of 1982. "The 'Sweetest Girl'" was placed at number 45 in NME's singles of the year for 1981, while "Faithless" was listed at number 35 in the magazine's equivalent list the following year.

In 2006, Garry Mulholland included the album in his book Fear of Music: The 261 Greatest Albums Since Punk and Disco where he described the record as "a unique and modestly epic fusion of pop, reggae, funk, soul, jazz and lyrics submerged in the deep end of political philosophy".

The Scottish band Wet Wet Wet took their name from a line in the track "Gettin' Havin' & Holdin'" – "it's tired of joking ... wet, wet with tears".

== Track listing ==
All songs written and arranged by Green Gartside. On the album credits "The Sweetest Girl" did not include the inverted commas used on the single version of the song.

Side one

1. "Asylums in Jerusalem" – 3:12
2. "A Slow Soul" – 3:16
3. "Jacques Derrida" – 4:58
4. "Lions After Slumber" – 6:09
5. "Faithless" – 4:13

Side two

6. "Sex" – 4:20
7. "Rock-A-Boy Blue" – 5:52
8. "Gettin' Havin' & Holdin'" – 5:16
9. "The Sweetest Girl" – 6:15

== Personnel ==
Adapted from the Songs to Remember liner notes. All personnel are credited on the album by their first names only.

- Joe Cang – bass
- Green Gartside – vocals, guitar
- Nial Jinks – bass
- Mike McEvoy – keyboards
- Tom Morley – drums
- Mgotse Mothle – double bass
- Jamie Talbot – saxophone
- Robert Wyatt – keyboards
- Jackie Challenor, Lorenza Johnson, Mae McKenna – backing vocals
- Matthew Kay – organisation (management)

Although he does not appear on the album, Steve Sidwell played trumpet on the single version of "Faithless".

== Charts ==
Chart (1982–1983)	Peak position
New Zealand Albums (RMNZ)	36
UK Albums (OCC)	12

== Release history ==
Region	Date	Label	Format	Catalog
United Kingdom	3 September 1982	Rough Trade	LP	ROUGH 20
United Kingdom	3 September 1982	Rough Trade	Cassette	ROUGH 20C
United Kingdom	1986	Rough Trade	CD	ROUGH CD 20
United Kingdom	15 October 2001	Virgin Records	Remastered CD	CDV 2944
