= Absolute (song) =

1984 single by Scritti Politti

Single by Scritti Politti

from the album Cupid & Psyche 85
- Released: 29 May 1984
- Genre: Sophisti-pop
- Length: 3:52 (7"); 4:25 (album); 6:10 (Version)
- Label: Virgin (UK); Warner Bros. (US)
- Songwriter: Green Gartside
- Producer: Arif Mardin

Scritti Politti singles chronology
"Wood Beez (Pray Like Aretha Franklin)" (1984)	"Absolute" (1984)	"Hypnotize" (1984)

Music video
- "Absolute" on YouTube

"Absolute" is the eighth single released by the British pop band Scritti Politti, released on 29 May 1984 by Virgin Records in the UK. It later appeared on the studio album Cupid & Psyche 85 (released in June 1985) and was produced by Arif Mardin.

Following on from their breakthrough hit "Wood Beez (Pray Like Aretha Franklin)", "Absolute" peaked at No. 17 on the UK singles chart. It also peaked at No. 10 on the Dutch Single Top 100.

The music video was directed by John Scarlett-Davis.

== Track listing ==
7" single

A: "Absolute" – 3:52
B: "Absolute" (Version) – 5:08 (an edit of the "Version" which appears on the 12")

12" single

A: "Absolute" – 4:16
B: "Absolute" (Version) – 6:10

== Charts ==
Chart (1984–1985)	Peak position
Australia (Kent Music Report)	77
Ireland (IRMA)	14
Netherlands (Dutch Top 40)	10
New Zealand (Recorded Music NZ)	26
UK Singles Chart	17
