= Wood Beez (Pray Like Aretha Franklin) =

1984 single by Scritti Politti

Single by Scritti Politti

from the album Cupid & Psyche 85
- Released: 24 February 1984
- Recorded: December 1983
- Genre: Post-disco; funk; boogie; synth-pop
- Length: 3:34 (7"); 4:48 (album); 5:54 (Version)
- Label: Virgin (UK); Warner Bros. (US)
- Songwriter: Green Gartside
- Producer: Arif Mardin

Scritti Politti singles chronology
"Asylums in Jerusalem"/"Jacques Derrida" (1982)	"Wood Beez (Pray Like Aretha Franklin)" (1984)	"Absolute" (1984)

Music video
- "Wood Beez (Pray Like Aretha Franklin)" on YouTube

"Wood Beez (Pray Like Aretha Franklin)" is the seventh single released by the British pop band Scritti Politti, issued in the UK on 24 February 1984 by Virgin Records. It later appeared on the band's second studio album Cupid & Psyche 85 (released in June 1985) and was produced by Arif Mardin. The song's subtitle is a reference to "I Say a Little Prayer", Aretha Franklin's biggest UK hit; Mardin had also produced Franklin.

The single was Scritti Politti's breakthrough hit on the UK Singles Chart, where it peaked at No. 10 in a 16-week chart run. It was also a Top 30 hit in Australia and New Zealand.

In the US, it was released as the follow up single to "Perfect Way" and peaked at No. 91 on the Billboard Hot 100 for 2 weeks in February of 1986.

== Style ==
Writing in a 2011 interview with Green Gartside, Robin Turner said:

In April '84, "Wood Beez (Pray Like Aretha Franklin)" crackled over airwaves from Anglesey to Arizona like an alien radio transmission beamed out to an unsuspecting planet. A gleaming, chromium nugget molded by ultra-modernist studioheads, it heralded in three and a half minutes the dramatic, bravura transformation of a band called Scritti Politti. Formerly a DIY squat punk band, they were now a group doused in glinting pop sheen. ... The resultant LP, Cupid and Psyche 85, yielded a string of radio-slaying singles ("Wood Beez...", "Absolute", "The Word Girl" and "Perfect Way") that segued fluently between ultra-slick robotised funk and meticulously constructed swoonsome lovers rock. Huge sales followed.

== Critical reception ==
Reviewed at the time of release, Sounds said, "Somewhere in this over-produced record is the last remaining remnant of the Scritts. The soulful strains of "Sweetest Girl" are gone, the voice is wispy. Whereas other people are straining to get an ounce of soul into their discs, Green lets the computer do the work and chews up any sparkle of emotion."

== Music videos ==
Two music videos were shot for the song. The first, shot in 1984, was directed by John Scarlett-Davis, who also directed the videos for "Absolute" and "The Word Girl" and features the dancing of Michael Clark. A second music video was released for the US in 1986, directed by Jean-Baptiste Mondino and featuring model Veronica Webb (who also appeared in the video for "Perfect Way"). Both versions were featured on a video compilation simply titled "Scritti Politti", released on VHS, Betamax and LaserDisc by Virgin Music Video in 1986. The 1984 version is simply titled "Wood Beez", while the 1986 version is titled "Wood Beez – USA".

== Other versions and uses ==
The extended version is subtitled "Version". It appeared on the CD release of the album and also on the 2005 compilation 12"/80s, which prompted AllMusic to call its inclusion "smart" and Pitchfork Media to note the extended version's "ultra-brite (p)op-art stabs and gimmicky samples are a mini-essay in mid-80s remixing-- as well as on what the 80s did to punk."

== Track listing ==
7" single

1. A: "Wood Beez" – 3:34
2. B: "Wood Beez" (Version) – 4:43 (an edit of the "Version" which appears on the 12")

12" single

1. A: "Wood Beez" – 4:50
2. B: "Wood Beez" (Version) – 5:54

CD single (released 1988)

1. "Wood Beez" – 4:50
2. "Small Talk" – 3:36
3. "Wood Beez" (Version) – 6:00

== Chart performance ==
=== Weekly charts ===
Chart (1984)	Peak position
Australia (Kent Music Report)	25
New Zealand	26
UK Singles Chart	10
US Billboard Hot Dance Club Play	4
