= Anomie & Bonhomie =

Studio album by Scritti Politti
- Released: 26 July 1999
- Recorded: 1997–1998
- Studio: The Townhouse (London, UK); Ocean Way Recording (Hollywood, California); Baby Monster Studios (New York City, New York).
- Genre: Alternative rock; rap rock; hip-hop
- Length: 49:27
- Label: Virgin
- Producer: David Gamson

Scritti Politti chronology
Provision (1988)	Anomie & Bonhomie (1999)	Early (2005)

Anomie & Bonhomie is the fourth studio album by the British band Scritti Politti, released on 26 July 1999 by Virgin Records. The album marks a sharp departure from their previous synth-pop era and features contributions from rappers Mos Def, Me'Shell Ndegeocello, and Lee Majors of Da Bush Babees. The track "Tinseltown to the Boogiedown" was released as a single, reaching number 46 in the UK singles chart.

== Critical reception ==
Professional ratings
Review scores
Source	Rating
AllMusic	4/5 stars
NME	3.5/5 stars

Anomie & Bonhomie was generally well received by critics; however, opinions regarding the reinvention of Scritti Politti's sound through its mixture with contemporary genres and vocal styles such as grunge and hip-hop, respectively, were both praised and denounced by critics.

Writing for AllMusic, Stephen Thomas Erlewine said that of the contemporary "updates" that "rapper cameos, vague house beats, grunge guitars -- sound as if they're pasted over backing tracks from 1986. Not necessarily a bad thing, but disconcerting, since the heart of this album is squarely in 'Cupid & Psyche 85' territory." Ultimately he concluded: "'Anomie & Bonhomie' [...] remains faithful to the sophisti-pop aesthetic the band pioneered in the mid-'80s."

NME stated that frontman Green Gartside successfully takes influences from contemporary genres such as grunge and hip-hop and "hammers" them into the Scritti aesthetic, concluding, "Gartside has returned with an album as glossy, eccentric and beguiling as he's ever made"

Andy Gill of The Independent was more critical, claiming that Anomie & Bonhomie has an "uneasy alliance between hard rock, hip-hop and ambient", that the album "comes waving a big sign announcing its sophistication, but, for all the care and polish taken in its execution, it lacks the easy, relaxed air that sustains the truly sophisticated."

== Track listing ==
All tracks are written by Green Gartside, except where noted.

No.	Title	Writer(s)	Length
1.	"Umm"	Gartside; Lee Majors	4:14
2.	"Tinseltown to the Boogiedown"	Gartside; Majors; Mos Def	4:55
3.	"First Goodbye"		5:13
4.	"Die Alone"		4:23
5.	"Mystic Handyman"		3:46
6.	"Smith 'n' Slappy"	Gartside; Mos Def	4:53
7.	"Born To Be"		3:53
8.	"The World You Understand (Is Over + Over + Over)"		3:13
9.	"Here Come July"		4:00
10.	"Prince Among Men"	Gartside; Mos Def	4:07
11.	"Brushed With Oil, Dusted With Powder"		6:05
Total length:			49:27

Japanese edition bonus track
No.	Title	Length
12.	"Dead Certainty"	4:20
Total length:		53:47

== Personnel ==
- Green Gartside – vocals, guitars, Ebow, vinylism (scratches), noises, music arrangements, vocal arrangements
- Allen Cato – guitars
- Wendy Melvoin – guitars
- David Dyson – bass
- David Gamson – bass, vocal arrangements
- Vere Isaacs – bass
- Me'Shell NdegéOcello – bass, backing vocals (2, 4, 8), rap (2, 4, 8)
- Abe Laboriel Jr. – drums
- William "Juju" House – drums
- Steve Pigott – string arrangements
- Paul Riser – string arrangements
- Brent Fischer – string contractor
- Patrick "Red Cloud" Mah – backing vocals
- Lee Majors – backing vocals (1, 2, 10), rap (1, 2, 10)
- Mos Def – rap (2, 6)
- Jimahl – backing vocals (4), rap (4)

== Production ==
- David Gamson – producer, mixing (2, 4, 6, 9, 10)
- John Hopkins – recording
- Rail Jon Rogut – recording
- Tim Burrell – compiling engineer
- Bob Power – mixing (1, 5, 8)
- Bob Brockman – mixing (3, 7, 11)
- Michael J. Ade – pre-production recording
- Andy Houston – pre-production recording
- Tom Coyne – mastering
- Ted Jensen – mastering
- Lon Cohen – guitar technician
- Bobby Schneck – guitar technician
- Ian Alexander – A&R coordinator
- Mary Hogan – project coordinator
- Green Gartside – art direction, design
- Paula Benson – art direction, design
- Paul West – art direction, design
- Mark Mattock – photography
- Simon Hicks – management

Studios

- Recorded at The Townhouse (London, UK); Ocean Way Recording (Hollywood, California); Baby Monster Studios (New York City, New York).
- Mixed at The Enterprise (Burbank, California); Room With A View, Sony Music Studios and Battery Studios (New York City, New York).
- Mastered at Sterling Sound (New York City, New York).

== Charts ==
Chart performance for Anomie & Bonhomie
Chart (1999)	Peak position
Swedish Albums (Sverigetopplistan)	59
UK Albums (OCC)	33
