= Scritti Politti =

British music group

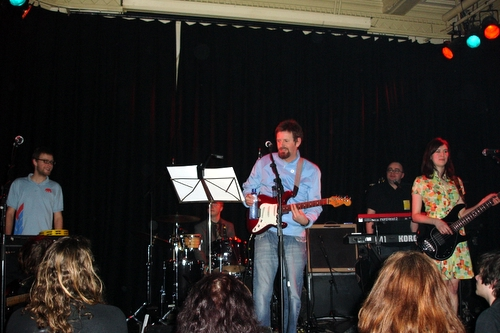
- Scritti Politti performing at Paradiso in Amsterdam, Netherlands, 2006

Background information
- Origin: Leeds, England
- Genres: Pop; new wave; synth-pop; sophisti-pop; blue-eyed soul; art pop; post-punk; avant-pop
- Years active: 1977–1991; 1999–present
- Labels: Rough Trade; Warner Bros.; Virgin
- Members: Green Gartside; Rhodri Marsden; Dicky Moore; Rob Smoughton
- Past members: Harry Denton: Alyssa McDonald; Dave Ferrett; Nial Jinks; Tom Morley; Joe Cang; Marcus Miller; Steve Ferrone; Paul Jackson Jr.; Fred Maher; David Gamson; Alan Murphy; Robert Scotland; Simon Emmerson

Scritti Politti are a British band formed in 1977 in Leeds by the Welsh singer-songwriter Green Gartside, who is the sole remaining member of the original band.

Initially formed as a punk-aligned underground act influenced by leftist politics, they transitioned into a commercial pop music project in the early 1980s, achieving success on the record charts in the UK. The group's most successful album, 1985's Cupid & Psyche 85, spawned three UK Top 20 hits with "Wood Beez (Pray Like Aretha Franklin)", "Absolute", and "The Word Girl", and one US Top 20 hit with "Perfect Way". The band's 1988 album Provision peaked in the UK Top 10 and produced a UK Top 20 hit single, "Oh Patti". After releasing two non-album singles in 1991, as well as a collaboration with B.E.F., the band returned in the late 1990s after a seven-year break.

== History ==
=== Origins ===
In the mid-1970s, Green Gartside studied fine art at Leeds Polytechnic. The punk rock group Sex Pistols 'Anarchy' tour, which included the Damned and the Heartbreakers, was launched at the Polytechnic on 6 December 1976. It inspired Gartside to form a band with his childhood friend Nial Jinks and fellow student Tom Morley.

Scritti Politti originally consisted of Gartside as the lead vocalist, Jinks as bass player, and Morley as drummer, with Matthew Kay as their manager who sometimes played the keyboard. Gartside and Jinks knew each other since being students at Croesyceiliog Grammar School in Cwmbran, South Wales. Gartside met Morley at Leeds Polytechnic. For their first public performance in 1976, supporting local Leeds punk group SOS, the group went under the name 'The Against'.

Upon finishing their studies, the group relocated to London's Camden Town around 1977, where they lived in a squat. The name Scritti Politti was chosen as a homage to the Italian Marxist writer and political theorist Antonio Gramsci. The correct spelling in Italian to refer to "Political Writings" would have produced Scritti Politici. Gartside changed it to Scritti Politti as he thought it sounded more rock and roll, like the Little Richard song "Tutti Frutti". Alongside other groups of what has been termed the DIY ethic or movement (notably The Desperate Bicycles and Steve Treatment, the latter being associated with Swell Maps), Scritti Politti released a DIY record titled "Skank Bloc Bologna" (a sort of ode to the traditionally leftist Italian city of Bologna) on their own St. Pancras label in 1978. Scritti Politti commonly added allusions to intellectual figures such as Karl Marx, Mikhail Bakunin, Jacques Derrida, Gilles Deleuze, and Jacques Lacan in their songs.

"Skank Bloc Bologna" gained airplay on John Peel's BBC Radio 1 show, and the band were signed to Rough Trade under Geoff Travis in 1979, making them labelmates with the other Cardiff avant-garde band, Young Marble Giants. Scritti Politti released two EPs in 1979 with singles "Bibbly-O-Tek", "Doubt Beat", "OPEC/Immac" and "Hegemony". "Hegemony"—which Gartside eventually cited as being based on the old English folk song "Lemady"—led to more melodic songs such as "Confidence", which in turn hinted at the direction the band would take in the 1980s.

Gartside reduced the band to three pieces. It exhibited an explicit do-it-yourself attitude, which manifested itself in their hand-made record sleeves with detailed breakdowns of production costs, including addresses and phone numbers of record pressing plants, and their own Camden squat address for feedback. They produced a booklet called "How To Make A Record", which was given the catalogue number SCRIT 3, and aimed to be a guide to recording and releasing a record for aspiring indie artists, based on Scritti Politti's personal experience of putting out their first three singles independently.

=== 1980s ===
Scritti Politti began planning their debut album in 1979, but the recording had to be delayed when Gartside collapsed after a gig supporting Gang of Four in Brighton in early 1980. Originally believed to be a heart attack, the cause of his collapse was eventually diagnosed as a panic attack, brought on by his chronic stage fright and his unhealthy lifestyle. Returning home to south Wales at his parents' insistence for a nine-month convalescence period, Gartside had plenty of time to think about the direction the band and where their music was going. During 1979, he had already become less interested in the independent music and punk scene and had started listening to and buying American funk and disco like Chic and the Jacksons, American soul like Aretha Franklin, and 1960s British beat music such as the Beatles' early records. Gartside came to the conclusion that making pop music did not require selling out punk's principles or dumbing down. He explained his reasons for abandoning the band's original "do-it-yourself" philosophy to Smash Hits in November 1981:

In simple terms, we were sick to death of the ghetto of the independent scene. The Garageland (Note: Garageland was a column in the NME covering the latest developments and releases in the independent music scene, particularly records and cassettes that were self-financed recordings and only available by mail order. Originally started in August 1980, the column was discontinued less than ten months later in May 1981 due to lack of interest and the acknowledgement that the fashion for the "DIY ethic" in music had passed. Green's referral to "the Garageland sections of the music papers" was therefore meant as a description of the DIY independent music scene in general.) sections of the music papers became more and more closeted with more and more people sitting in their bedrooms making cassettes and swapping them with other people making cassettes. There were more and more silly names and it began to smack more and more of 'hippy-ness'. It had become an ageing alternative that was never going to present a route for people who wanted to make their music on a wide scale. We never particularly wanted to become a cult group, but the music was very marginal and we were—perhaps rightly—stereotyped as intellectuals.

As well as his musical change of heart, Gartside had also abandoned the strict Marxist philosophy of the early Scritti Politti ideas and recordings, saying that "a lot of the very oppositional politics that we'd been involved in lost their appeal and credibility for me. I rejected the principles of that, what was monolithical Marxism. I no longer supported the mechanism which held that up, and carried over to the music. Plus I was bored shitless with the noise we were making."

Before his collapse Gartside had already broached the concept of taking the group in a more commercial pop direction with his bandmates. His ideas did not go down well with them, as he recounted in an interview for Jamming! fanzine in June 1982:

In 1980 I spent nine months in Wales, and the reason I went away was not just because I was sick, but also because there was a bit of dissension in the group about me. I wanted to go very poppy, but Tom [Morley, drummer] and Nial [Jinks, bassist] weren't very keen on the idea, so in coordinance with the old bookwormish Scritti Politti I decided to make some notes – which in retrospect is a ridiculous thing to do – about the theory and politics of it, and why it was a good thing to do, as opposed to keep slogging away at St. Pancras Records [Scritti Politti's self-financed independent record label]. So I went away and wrote an enormous amount of stuff for them as well. I ended up saying, 'Right, from now on when I've got a number of songs I want to do, then if you want to play on them, that's great; if you don't, lets forget the whole thing'.

Gartside recorded a demo of one of his new songs, "The 'Sweetest Girl'", in January 1981, and the song was included on the C81 cassette compilation obtained with tokens from the March issues of NME. The song – which features Robert Wyatt on keyboards – received strong reviews. It was cited by The New York Times as one of the ten best singles of the year, but the track did not get a wide release for ten months, by which time momentum was lost, and it only achieved a minor placing on the UK Singles Chart at No. 64. The single was later covered by pop band Madness, with their version reaching No. 35 on the UK Singles Chart in 1986. Drummer Tom Morley departed Scritti Politti in November 1982.

"The 'Sweetest Girl'" prompted many major labels to offer Gartside record contracts, but he decided to stay with Rough Trade Records. "The 'Sweetest Girl'" marked a stylistic change toward the more melodic, and was followed by minor hits "Faithless" (UK No. 56) and double A-side "Asylums in Jerusalem" / "Jacques Derrida" (UK No. 43). The song "Jacques Derrida" was influenced by Gartside's reading of deconstruction and the work of semiotic analysis from the French philosopher Derrida.

The debut album, Songs to Remember, was released on Rough Trade in August 1982. Displaying Gartside's previously hidden reggae influence, it was a critical and commercial success, reaching No. 12 in the UK Albums Chart. One of Rough Trade's most unlikely success stories, the album became their biggest selling release to date. Also during this period, Gartside recorded a duet with Annie Lennox on the Eurythmics track "Wrap It Up", for their Sweet Dreams (Are Made of This) album released in early 1983.

Around this time Gartside returned to his home in South Wales:

I became sick. I went back to Caerleon... and I started listening to my sister's music for the first time. She had a lot of black music. Around that time my parents moved to Florida, and it was visiting there I first heard black radio – that's where I first heard 'the funk'. The System, Zapp... artists like that. There was a rapid change of influences combined with a disgust at big-I 'Indie' being born. It didn't take long to say, 'Fuck that, let's do this instead.'

Gartside became influenced by the new sounds coming out of New York City, especially hip-hop. He signed with Virgin Records in 1983 (and with Warner Bros. in the US.) The original line-up was disbanded and Gartside moved to New York.

Collaborating with veteran producer Arif Mardin, David Gamson and Fred Maher, the first recording to emerge from these sessions was the single: "Wood Beez (Pray Like Aretha Franklin)". Released in February 1984, "Wood Beez" was an immediate UK hit, peaking at No. 10, and was also successful in Australia, charting at No. 25, and in New Zealand where it reached No. 26. A series of intricately programmed dance/soul-style hits followed, including "Absolute" (UK No. 17), "Hypnotize" (UK No. 68 and No. 43 on the US Dance Charts) and the reggae-styled "The Word Girl", which became Scritti Politti's biggest UK hit single, climbing to No. 6 in May 1985.

Green Gartside: The record is an art form by its own.

In June 1985, Scritti Politti released their second (and most successful) album, Cupid & Psyche 85, with songs produced by Arif Mardin and performances by numerous session musicians. The LP was a top 5 hit in the UK and sold well in the US. In addition to the four already released singles, the album included the song, "Perfect Way". It was only a minor hit when released in the UK (No. 48) but it became the band's biggest US single, peaking at No. 11.

The personnel for Cupid and Psyche 85 differed from that of their first album, and featured keyboardist David Gamson and ex-Material drummer Fred Maher, both of whom would collaborate with Gartside on songwriting and production duties. Arif Mardin would also produce three songs for the album. Stylistically, the songs on the album feature dense timbral counterpoint (in fact, nearly every song on the album), using synthesizer chords and effects (as well as "real" instruments), programmed largely by David Gamson, creating a style that they would refine in their next album. In the US, "Wood Beez" was re-released as the follow-up single to "Perfect Way", but it only managed to hit No. 91 (it had previously hit No. 4 on the US Dance charts in late 1984).

In 1986, Gartside and Gamson wrote and produced "Love of a Lifetime" for Chaka Khan, which appeared on her Destiny album. The same year they also collaborated to write the title track for Al Jarreau's album, L is For Lover.

In 1987, Scritti Politti appeared on the Who's That Girl soundtrack with the song "Best Thing Ever". This track also appeared on the next Scritti Politti album, 1988's Provision, which continued Gartside's development into synth-funk as well as reggae and other styles. The roster of session players became even more notable, including contributions from Roger Troutman, Marcus Miller and Miles Davis, who performed on the single "Oh Patti (Don't Feel Sorry for Loverboy)", a UK No. 13 hit. Although the album charted in the top 10 in the UK (No. 8), it did not match the commercial success of Cupid and Psyche 85 in the US, stalling at No. 113.

=== 1990s ===
Scritti Politti entered the UK charts again in 1991 with their cover of the Beatles' "She's a Woman", which featured guest vocals from Shabba Ranks and a remix version by William Orbit. It became Scritti Politti's final UK top 20 single, peaking at No. 20. This was swiftly followed by the release of "Take Me in Your Arms and Love Me"', a cover of the Gladys Knight song, featuring guest vocals from Sweetie Irie, which failed to chart inside the top 40. The same year, Gartside also worked with B.E.F. as a guest vocalist for their cover of "I Don't Know Why I Love You" for the album Music of Quality and Distinction, Volume 2. However, a new Scritti Politti album never materialised, with Gartside deciding on another hiatus.

The hip-hop inspired album Anomie and Bonhomie was released in 1999, and involved even more session artists. The now bearded Gartside dived directly into the now commercially accessible hip-hop scene, borrowing tradesmen of the genre such as Mos Def and Jimahl amongst others. While considered by many critics to be a return to form, the album was not as commercially successful as their previous output, reaching only No. 33 on the UK Albums Chart.

=== 21st century ===
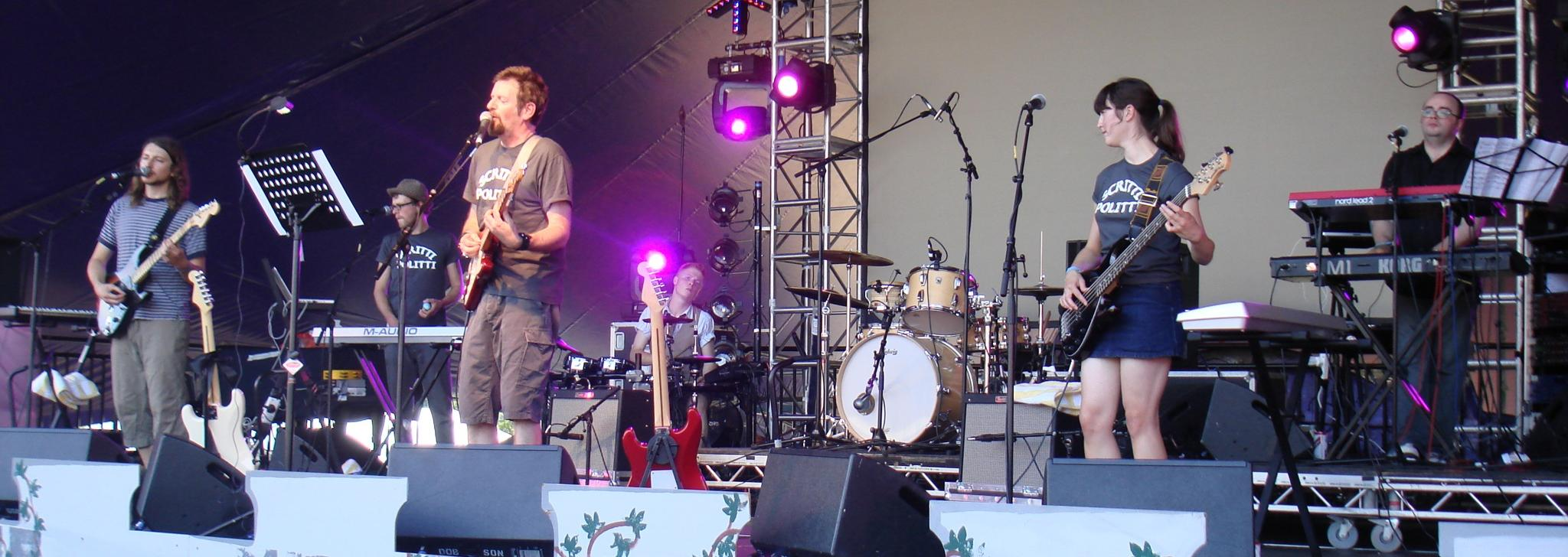
Performing in 2006

In 2003, Gartside appeared on Kylie Minogue's album Body Language, duetting on the Emiliana Torrini co-write "Someday".

In February 2005, Rough Trade released Early, a compilation album of Scritti Politti's earliest recordings.

In early January 2006, Gartside and a new incarnation of Scritti Politti, billed as 'Double G and the Traitorous 3', played a show in Brixton. This was Gartside's first live appearance since 1980. This band, including journalist/musician Rhodri Marsden on keyboards, Dicky Moore on guitar and Ralph Phillips on drums, played a number of concerts previewing a new album, White Bread, Black Beer, which was released on Rough Trade on 29 May 2006. Later that year, White Bread, Black Beer was nominated for the Mercury Music Prize.

The current line-up toured worldwide (under the Scritti Politti name) on the back of the album's success, embarked on their first-ever North American tour in October 2006 and completed a UK tour in November 2006. They appeared at the Bestival music festival in September 2006, and at Summer Sonic Festival in Japan. On 19 December, they played a short set at the Rough Trade Christmas party in London.

In 2007, Gartside worked on an album with Alexis Taylor, the singer with Hot Chip. The pair met at the Mercury Music Prize ceremony, and played a concert supporting Kieran Hebden and Steve Reid at KOKO in London in March 2007.

Gartside joined 'Way to Blue: The Songs of Nick Drake', a 2008 UK and Australian tour featuring interpretations of Nick Drake's songs by amongst others, Robyn Hitchcock, Lisa Hannigan and Teddy Thompson. A subsequent live 15-track CD was released, including Gartside's version of Drake's "Fruit Tree" which he also performed at The Barbican, London.

In 2009, Gartside participated in 'Very Cellular Songs', a concert at The Barbican celebrating the music of the Incredible String Band.

On 28 February 2011, Absolute, a compilation of singles and album tracks was released, with two new tracks both written with David Gamson: "Day Late and a Dollar Short" and "A Place We Both Belong". Gamson played a part in the recording of both Cupid & Psyche 85 and Provision. The album was voted "Best New Reissue" by Pitchfork on 10 March 2011.

The Tracey Thorn Christmas album Tinsel and Lights, released in October 2012, featured a duet with Gartside and a cover of the song "Snow in Sun" from White Bread, Black Beer.

Gartside has also collaborated with fellow Welshmen, the Manic Street Preachers. In addition to Gartside contributing lead vocals to the track "Between the Clock and the Bed" on the Manics' Futurology album (2014), Scritti Politti was the support act for three of the Manics' live shows in April 2014.

In 2020, Gartside released a solo single under his own name. This release on Rough Trade records featured covers of "Tangled Man" and "Wishing Well" as originally recorded by folk singer Anne Briggs.

Rough Trade also picked up the rights to the band's Virgin/Warner US albums with Cupid & Psyche 85, Provision and Anomie & Bonhomie due to be re-issued on CD and vinyl by the indie label on 30 July 2021, with a re-issue of Provision delayed until later in the year.

== Legacy and influence ==
Miles Davis covered Scritti Politti's song "Perfect Way" on his 1986 album Tutu. Davis also appeared on the track "Oh Patti (Don't Feel Sorry for Loverboy)" on the band's album Provision.

"The 'Sweetest Girl'" was covered by Madness on their 1985 album Mad Not Mad.

There are references to Scritti Politti's "sugar coated pop" sound on Max Tundra's Parallax Error Beheads You. Tundra said that he welcomed comparisons with Scritti Politti.

Richard Thompson references the band in his song "A Bone Through Her Nose" from his 1986 release Daring Adventures ("Her boyfriend plays in Scritti Politti...").

Kurt Feldman (the Pains of Being Pure at Heart, the Depreciation Guild) stated that the band's music is a major inspiration for his work. The influence is especially prominent on the album Afar, released under his Ice Choir project.

Other artists who have cited Scritti Politti as an influence include Kylie Minogue, Matty Healy of The 1975, Carly Rae Jepsen, Dirty Projectors, Max Tundra, and Haim. Elton John has also expressed an affinity for the group.

== Discography ==
- Songs to Remember (1982)
- Cupid & Psyche 85 (1985)
- Provision (1988)
- Anomie & Bonhomie (1999)
- White Bread Black Beer (2006)

== Awards and nominations ==
Award	Year	Nominee(s)	Category	Result	Ref.
D&AD Awards	2000	Anomie & Bonhomie's Campaign	Graphic Design - Graphite Pencil	Won	
D&AD Awards	2000	Anomie & Bonhomie's Album Poster	Graphic Design - Wood Pencil	Won	
D&AD Awards	2000	"Tinseltown to the Boogiedown"'s Single Poster	Graphic Design - Wood Pencil	Won	
D&AD Awards	2000	Anomie & Bonhomie's Promo Book	Graphic Design - Wood Pencil	Won	
Grammy Awards	1989	Provision	Best Engineered Recording – Non-Classical	Nominated	
Mercury Prize	2006	White Bread Black Beer	Album of the Year	Nominated	
Smash Hits Poll Winners Party	1985	Cupid & Psyche 85	Best LP	Nominated	
UK Festival Awards	2006	Scritti Politti	Festival Pop Act	Nominated	

== See also ==
- List of post-punk bands
- List of new wave artists
- List of one-hit wonders in the United States
- List of performers on Top of the Pops
- List of Peel sessions
