= Perfect Way =

1985 single by Scritti Politti

Single by Scritti Politti

from the album Cupid & Psyche 85
- Released: 27 August 1985
- Genre: New wave; funk-pop
- Length: 4:33 (album version); 4:02 (single version)
- Label: Virgin (UK); Warner Bros. (US)
- Songwriters: Green Gartside; David Gamson
- Producers: Green Gartside; David Gamson; Fred Maher

Scritti Politti singles chronology
"The Word Girl" (1985)	"Perfect Way" (1985)	"Oh Patti (Don't Feel Sorry for Loverboy)" (1988)

Official video
- "Perfect Way" on YouTube

"Perfect Way" is a song written by Green Gartside and David Gamson and performed by the British pop band Scritti Politti. It was featured on the band's second and most successful studio album, Cupid & Psyche 85, released in June 1985. The song features synthesizer in its instrumentation.

== Chart performance ==
Four singles had already been released in the UK from the album before "Perfect Way" was issued in August 1985. It was only a minor hit in the UK (No. 48), but in the US "Perfect Way" became Scritti Politti's only top 40 hit, reaching No. 11 on the Billboard Hot 100. On other US charts, "Perfect Way" reached No. 6 on the Hot Dance/Disco chart and No. 85 on the Hot Black Singles chart. In Canada, it reached No. 32 on the RPM singles chart.

== Music video ==
The official music video, which mixes monochrome and colour footage, features musicians performing in the studio, intercut with close-up faces, video effects, and urban scenes, was directed by Paula Greif and Peter Kagan.

The music video features singer and actress Fiona Flanagan and supermodel Veronica Webb.

== Critical reception ==
John Leland of Spin wrote the song was, "a pretty, lightweight pop tune that skips around on a busy electronic groove as feyly as Green's ultrawimp vocals. This is extremely well crafted, but it packs all the punch of a neutered "Sussudio"."

== Charts ==
=== Weekly charts ===
Chart (1986)	Peak position
Australia (Kent Music Report)	75

=== Year-end charts ===
Year-end chart (1986)	Rank
US Top Pop Singles (Billboard)	64

== Cover versions ==
An instrumental version of the song was covered by Miles Davis on his 1986 studio album Tutu, providing a second success for the song in the US. The song entered Davis' live repertoire and he was recorded playing it live many times. Davis would make a guest appearance on Scritti Politti's next album Provision (1988), playing trumpet on the hit single "Oh Patti (Don't Feel Sorry For Loverboy)".
