= The Word Girl =

1985 single by Scritti Politti

Single by Scritti Politti

from the album Cupid & Psyche 85
- B-side: "Flesh & Blood"
- Released: 29 April 1985
- Genre: Lovers rock; reggae; pop
- Label: Virgin
- Songwriters: Green Gartside; David Gamson
- Producer: Scritti Politti

Scritti Politti singles chronology
"Hypnotize" (1984)	"The Word Girl" (1985)	"Perfect Way" (1985)

Music video
- "The Word Girl" on YouTube

"The Word Girl" is a song by the British pop band Scritti Politti. Included as the opening track on their second studio album, Cupid & Psyche 85, the reggae style song was released as a single in the UK on 29 April 1985 by Virgin Records, serving as the fourth single from the album. It remains the band's highest-charting hit in the UK, peaking at No. 6 on the UK singles chart.

The band self-produced and recorded the song as a trio, supplemented by guitarist Nick Moroch. The B-side to the single, "Flesh & Blood", is an alternative version of the song with lovers rock and roots reggae chanter Ranking Ann on lead vocals.

== Background and composition ==
Harking back to the band's 1981 single "The 'Sweetest Girl'" with a reggae-based rhythm, it attempts to deconstruct the use of the word 'girl' in everyday language and in pop songs. Gartside told Sounds, "I was taking stock of all the lyrics of the songs for the new album and, lo and behold, in every song there was – this girl, or that girl. It seemed a good idea to show awareness of the device being used, to take it out of neutral and show it didn't connote or denote certain things. It was important to admit a consciousness of the materiality of referring to 'girls' in songs."

== Critical reception ==
Spin called it a "bubbling reggae ditty. Sort of like Bryan Ferry, only infinitely more sophisticated."

== Music video ==
The music video was directed by John Scarlett-Davis and produced by Nick Verden at Aldabra Films for Virgin Records. They perform in a dark, empty theatre, where Green plays a sunburst Fender while multiple projectors play films of a young woman who makes hand drawings with moisture on a nearby rainy window.

== Charts ==
Chart (1985)	Peak position
Australia (Kent Music Report)	70
Netherlands (Single Top 100)	18
New Zealand (RIANZ)	18
UK Singles (Official Charts)	6
