= Cupid & Psyche 85 =

Studio album by Scritti Politti
- Released: 10 June 1985
- Recorded: 1983–1985
- Studios: Minot Sound (New York City); Power Station (New York City); Atlantic Studios (New York City); Eden Studios (London); Wessex Sound Studios (London); Sarm West (London); Sarm East (London)
- Genres: Pop; synth-pop; art pop; electro-funk; blue-eyed soul; sophisti-pop; R&B; bubblegum pop; pop-soul
- Length: 38:50 (LP); 63:11/62:40 (CD)
- Labels: Virgin (UK); Warner Bros. (US)
- Producers: Scritti Politti; Arif Mardin

Scritti Politti chronology
Songs to Remember (1982)	Cupid & Psyche 85 (1985)	Provision (1988)

Singles from Cupid & Psyche 85
- 1. "Wood Beez (Pray Like Aretha Franklin)" Released: 24 February 1984; 2. "Absolute" Released: 29 May 1984; 3. "Hypnotize" Released: 2 November 1984; 4. "The Word Girl" Released: 29 April 1985; 5. "Perfect Way" Released: 27 August 1985; 6. "Lover to Fall (Remix Version)" Released: 1985 (France only)

Cupid & Psyche 85 is the second studio album by the British pop band Scritti Politti, released in the UK on 10 June 1985 by Virgin Records. The release continued frontman Green Gartside's embrace of commercial pop music stylings and state-of-the-art studio production, while its lyrics reflect his preoccupation with language and politics.

It remains the band's most commercially successful studio album, peaking at number five on the UK Albums Chart, and was certified gold by the British Phonographic Industry (BPI) for 100,000 copies sold. The album contained five singles, three of which were top 20 hits on the UK singles chart. The single "Perfect Way" became a surprise hit in the US, peaking at number 11 on the Billboard Hot 100 in a 25-week run on the chart.

== Background ==
Scritti Politti's debut studio album Songs to Remember had been released in September 1982, but even before the album's release frontman Gartside had expressed in interviews his frustration at the limitations of being signed to an independent label like Rough Trade Records. After Songs to Remember he began to talk to major record labels, a move reluctantly supported by Rough Trade who wanted to keep him but realised they could not support him financially with the budget for the type of record that Gartside wanted to make. At the same time Gartside had been distancing himself from the Marxist collective that Scritti Politti had originated from, and by the time of the album's release Scritti Politti was effectively his solo vehicle, the other original members having left during the album's recording or shortly afterwards (the album's release had been delayed by a year at the band's request).

During the recording of Songs to Remember Rough Trade had introduced Gartside to the New York musician David Gamson. Gamson was a keyboardist, programmer and an assistant engineer for the label who had used some studio downtime to record a demo version of the Archies' 1969 hit song "Sugar, Sugar". Gartside and Gamson hit it off and decided that they would work together in future as they had similar ideas about the type of music they wanted to make.

== Recording ==
In 1983 the duo of Gartside and Gamson travelled to Gamson's home city of New York and met up with another New Yorker, drummer Fred Maher, to put together a new version of Scritti Politti. Maher remembered, "I'll never forget the first time I saw Green. It was in the studio in New York and he came up to me and said 'hello, I'm Green, I'm terrible'. He'd been out the night before with Marc Almond [of Soft Cell] and he looked a bit the worse for wear." The trio continued work on "Small Talk" which had been started by Gamson and Gartside in the UK and was later remixed by Nile Rodgers. They hoped to release it as a new Scritti Politti single. However, due to the legal battle involving Green's release from his contract with Rough Trade, the single was never released. "Small Talk" would eventually appear as a track on Cupid & Psyche 85. Another song from this period written by Gartside and Gamson, "L Is for Lover", was recorded by the American R&B singer Al Jarreau and released as the title track of his 1986 studio album.

Green remained in New York with his new musical partners, and with the help of his new manager Bob Last he finally resolved his problems with Rough Trade and signed major label deals with Virgin Records in the UK and with Warner Bros. Records in North America. He also used the time to set up meetings with musicians and producers that he wanted to work with, later recalling, "I seemed to get put in touch with anybody I wanted to meet and they were all very enthusiastic". Following the signing of the new recording contracts, the band remained in New York and recorded three songs with producer Arif Mardin: "Wood Beez (Pray Like Aretha Franklin)", "Absolute" and "Don't Work That Hard"; the first two would later become singles from the new album. Gartside told NME, "He was the producer I most wanted to work with. We sent him some demos and he liked them very much and wanted to do it. It was his work with people like Chaka Khan over the past few years that made me want to work with Arif. Her [1981] version of [ the Beatles'] 'We Can Work It Out' – incredible!" Gamson brought the influence of black American radio acts such as Parliament-Funkadelic, while Gartside took inspiration from nascent hip-hop music. According to Uncle Dave Lewis of AllMusic, "no prior pop album had integrated the techniques of sampling and sequencing to such a great degree".

== Composition and release ==
The first single to be released from the album was "Wood Beez (Pray Like Aretha Franklin)" in February 1984, its subtitle alluding to Aretha Franklin's 1968 song "I Say a Little Prayer" which producer Arif Mardin had also worked on. Asked about the change in musical direction Gartside admitted, "if you'd played me 'Wood Beez' six years ago I think I'd have spat at it or something. But I like change." He described the song as "very complicated, it's the whole question of what pop is; its relationship to language, power and politics. It's also a question of music's transgression and abuse of some of the rules of language. Aretha was singing what are arguably inane pop songs and had left her gospel roots. But she sang them with a fervour, a passion, though I hate to use that word because it's been hideously tarred in recent usage. To a committed materialist whose interest had come round to language again – perhaps because of a bankruptcy in Marxism to deal with ideology or any artistic community – hearing her was as near to a hymn or a prayer as I could get. Obviously I couldn't make that point in a three minute pop song."

After releasing "Absolute" and "Hypnotize" as the follow-up singles, there was a gap of six months before "The Word Girl" was released as the fourth single, just ahead of the album. "The Word Girl" was the biggest hit single from the album in the UK and harked back to Scritti Politti's 1981 single "The 'Sweetest Girl'" in its reggae-based rhythm and its attempt to deconstruct the use of the word 'girl' in everyday language and in pop songs. Gartside told Sounds, "I was taking stock of all the lyrics of the songs for the new album and, lo and behold, in every song there was – this girl, or that girl. It seemed a good idea to show awareness of the device being used, to take it out of neutral and show it didn't connote or denote certain things. It was important to admit a consciousness of the materiality of referring to 'girls' in songs."

The single's B-side "Flesh and Blood" (which also appeared as one of the four bonus tracks on the cassette and CD versions of Cupid & Psyche 85) was the same musical backing of "The Word Girl" but with a new lyric written and sung by militant south London lovers rock and roots reggae MC Ranking Ann (real name Ann Swinton). Green explained that the idea was to present the alternative female view of the male construct of 'girl': "Having heard Ann's two albums, I thought she'd like the sentiments of the song rather than approve of the rhythmics. I knew she was stroppy, but it's positive. She saw she'd be giving her counsel to a completely different audience – teenagers. Which I think is great. It complements what we've done on the other side." The single's sleeve reinforced the point being made in the lyrics: fragments of the label of Aretha Franklin's 1967 single "Chain of Fools" and a section of the Écrits (1966) by the French psychoanalyst and psychiatrist Jacques Lacan with the word "chain" prominent in both, superimposed on a picture of the American actress and author Shirley MacLaine from the comedy drama film My Geisha (1962) dressed as a bride and wearing an expression of resignation on her face.

Although Scritti Politti had embraced the musical mainstream, Gartside's lyrics were often still preoccupied with the contradiction of becoming more distant from the reality of a person the more one became in love with the idealised version of that person, summed up on the album track "A Little Knowledge" by the line "Now I know to love you is not to know you". This contradiction was reflected in the album's title, referring to the myth of the two ancient Greek gods who were destined to never be able to truly love each other. Gartside explained in interviews that "there is a fable, the myth of Cupid and Psyche, and the deal was that they would stay in love as long as they never tried too hard to find out too much about each other – they should just enjoy each other's company and not make demands. But that's what they made the mistake of doing, so Cupid fled, for some reason, and Psyche was sent around the world for eternity to find him. Although, at the very end of the legend, they do get reconciled... But in our society, Cupid has now come to stand for 'romance' and Psyche for 'hidden lurking depths', so of course it would've been preposterous to call the album Cupid and Psyche. But putting '85 after it makes it... perfectly cool. It makes it awfully sensible."

A remastered version of the album was issued, in digital format, in March 2022.

== Critical reception ==
Professional ratings
Review scores
Source	Rating
AllMusic	4.5/5 stars
Classic Pop	5/5 stars
Pitchfork	9.6/10
Record Collector	5/5 stars
Record Mirror	4/5
The Rolling Stone Album Guide	4/5 stars
Sounds	4.75/5 stars
Spin Alternative Record Guide	9/10
Uncut	8/10
The Village Voice	A−

Reviews for Cupid & Psyche 85 were generally positive. Melody Maker said, "It may not be the sweetest sound in all the world... but it's close. In pursuit of the silkier sensations to be cut from the sow's ear of pop, Scritti's Green has finally let the slide rule slip and succumbed to sensuality. His guerrilla days as the post-Marxist irritant of his peculiarly capitalist trade [...] aren't completely lost, of course. He's still aware of the irony of his role, and nagging snatches of guilt and cries of conscience continually pepper Cupid, subverting its aims." The review concluded that "as a free-standing product, this is pop as it should be: smart, sweet but not sickly, rich and seductive, exotic, teasing, tempting and, judging by its persistent insinuation onto my Walkman, a durable, desirable thrill". Awarding the album "4¾ stars out of 5", Sounds wrote, "If you only indulge yourself in one smooth, non-alternative, chainstore pop album this year, make it this". However, NME dismissed Green's wordplay as insincere: "In his pop music, he plays with the language of the medium, both verbal and musical, in a way which implicitly criticises the way the language was used originally... Unfortunately, when this kind of post-modernist dissection is applied to affairs of the heart it can't help but come across hollow and artificial, because it's getting further removed from the business of actually moving, of authentic emotional experience."

In the US, Spin stated that "no disco was ever this sublime" and that Green's mixture of pop music and intellectualism "benefits us by teaching us the vocabulary of emotion. Green's gilded, fabricated palace of sentiment makes you want to know more about these matters even as his clever-dick wordplay, woozy vocals and slick manipulation of modern dance music's subtlest syncopations lead you onto some empty dance floor of the soul." Writing for The Village Voice, critic Robert Christgau wrote that "the high-relief production and birdlike tunes and spry little keyb arrangements and hippety-hoppety beat and archly ethereal falsetto add up to a music of amazing lightness and wit that's saved from any hint of triviality by wordplay whose delight in its own turns is hard to resist." Rolling Stone was cooler towards the record, acknowledging that Scritti Politti's new direction worked well on "Wood Beez (Pray Like Aretha Franklin)" and "Absolute", but that "the rest of Cupid & Psyche 85 isn't deviant enough. Green has absorbed the lessons of dance masters like Arif Mardin so well that he often imitates the very formulas he seeks to undermine... Stylishly wrought, at times delightfully eccentric, Cupid & Psyche 85 is ultimately too true to its form to be genuinely subversive." Among retrospective reviews, AllMusic called the album "a state-of-the-art, immaculately constructed set of catchy synth pop", and Pitchfork deemed it a "masterpiece of gleamingly mechanized post-modern pop" while concluding that "Gartside's genius lies not in his accounts of complex philosophical problems but in the way he alchemizes them into something joyful, into music that speaks to the heart, just like Aretha Franklin's."

== Track listing ==
All songs written by Green Gartside, except where noted.

=== LP ===
Side one

1. "The Word Girl" (Gartside, David Gamson) – 4:24
2. "Small Talk" (Gartside, Gamson) – 3:39
3. "Absolute" – 4:25
4. "A Little Knowledge" – 5:02
5. "Don't Work That Hard" – 3:59

Side two

1. "Perfect Way" (Gartside, Gamson) – 4:33 [UK/US]; 4:43 [Japan LP – Remixed]
2. "Lover to Fall" – 4:13 [UK Version]; 3:52 [US Version – Remixed]
3. "Wood Beez (Pray Like Aretha Franklin)" – 4:48
4. "Hypnotize" (Gartside, Gamson) – 3:34

=== Cassette ===
Side one

1. "The Word Girl" (Gartside, David Gamson) – 4:24
2. "Small Talk" (Gartside, Gamson) – 3:39
3. "Absolute" – 4:25
4. "A Little Knowledge" – 5:02
5. "Don't Work That Hard" – 3:59
6. "Flesh & Blood" (Gartside, Gamson, Ann Swinton) – 5:35
7. "Absolute" (Version) – 6:11

Side two

1. "Perfect Way" (Gartside, Gamson) – 4:33
2. "Lover to Fall" – 4:13 [UK]; 3:52 [US]
3. "Wood Beez (Pray Like Aretha Franklin)" – 4:48
4. "Hypnotize" (Gartside, Gamson) – 3:34
5. "Wood Beez" (Version) – 5:56
6. "Hypnotize" (Version) – 6:34

=== CD ===
1. "The Word Girl" (Gartside, David Gamson) – 4:24
2. "Small Talk" (Gartside, Gamson) – 3:39
3. "Absolute" – 4:25
4. "A Little Knowledge" – 5:02
5. "Don't Work That Hard" – 3:59
6. "Perfect Way" (Gartside, Gamson) – 4:43 [UK CD – Remixed]; 4:33 [US CD]
7. "Lover to Fall" – 4:13 [UK]; 3:52 [US]
8. "Wood Beez (Pray Like Aretha Franklin)" – 4:48
9. "Hypnotize" (Gartside, Gamson) – 3:34
10. "Flesh & Blood" (Gartside, Gamson, Ann Swinton) – 5:35
11. "Absolute" (Version) – 6:11
12. "Wood Beez" (Version) – 5:56
13. "Hypnotize" (Version) – 6:34

=== Deluxe Edition Remastered ===
1. "The Word Girl" (Gartside, David Gamson) – 4:24
2. "Small Talk" (Gartside, Gamson) – 3:38
3. "Absolute" – 4:24
4. "A Little Knowledge" – 5:01
5. "Don't Work That Hard" – 3:59
6. "Perfect Way" (Gartside, Gamson) – 4:33
7. "Lover to Fall" – 4:12
8. "Wood Beez (Pray Like Aretha Franklin)" – 4:48
9. "Hypnotize" (Gartside, Gamson) – 3:35
10. "Flesh & Blood" (Gartside, Gamson, Ann Swinton) – 5:35
11. "Absolute" (Version) – 6:10
12. "Wood Beez" (Version) – 5:56
13. "Hypnotize" (Version) – 4:21
14. "Perfect Way" (Version) – 5:03
15. "Lover to Fall" 12" Dance Mix – 6:18
16. "Perfect Way" 12" Dance Mix – 7:24

== Personnel ==
Credits are adapted from the Cupid & Psyche 85 liner notes.

Scritti Politti

- Green Gartside – vocals, keyboards (3), arrangements (3, 8), guitars (7)
- David Gamson – keyboards, arrangements (3–5, 7, 8)
- Fred Maher – drums (1, 2, 4, 6, 7, 9, 10), drum programming (3, 5, 8)

Additional musicians

- Simon Climie – Fairlight programming (2)
- Robbie Buchanan – keyboards (3, 5, 8, 11, 12)
- David Frank – keyboards (3, 5, 8, 11, 12)
- J. J. Jeczalik – Fairlight programming (3)
- EBN (Ned Liben) – Fairlight programming (3, 5, 7–9, 11–13)
- Nick Moroch – guitars (1, 6, 7)
- Alan Murphy – guitars (2, 6)
- Paul Jackson Jr. – guitars (3, 5, 8, 11, 12)
- Ira Siegel – guitars (4)
- Robert Quine – guitars (5)
- Will Lee – bass (3)
- Marcus Miller – bass (5)
- Steve Ferrone – drums (3, 5, 8)
- B.J. Nelson – backing vocals (1–5, 7–13), vocals (4)
- Tawatha Agee – backing vocals (3, 5, 8)
- Fonzi Thornton – backing vocals (3, 5, 8)
- Ranking Ann (Ann Swinton) – additional vocals and toasting (10)

== Production ==
- Scritti Politti – producers (1, 2, 4, 6, 7, 9, 10, 13)
- Arif Mardin – producer (3, 5, 8, 11, 12)
- Howard Gray – engineer (1, 2, 6, 10), mixing (1, 2, 4–7, 10)
- Jason Corsaro – engineer (3, 5, 8), mixing (8)
- Lew Hahn – engineer (3, 5, 8)
- Gary Langan – mixing (3, 9)
- Ray Bardani – engineer (4, 7, 9)
- Bunt Stafford-Clark – additional tape editing
- Tony Cousins – mastering
- Townhouse Studios (London, England) – editing and mastering location
- Art-O-Matic – artwork
- Keith Breeden – package design
- Andy Earl – group photography
- Rob Brimson – article photography
- Robert Warr – management

== Chart performance ==
Chart (1985–1986)	Peak position
Australian Albums (Kent Music Report)	59
Canada Top Albums/CDs (RPM)	55
Dutch Albums (Album Top 100)	9
New Zealand Albums (RMNZ)	12
Swedish Albums (Sverigetopplistan)	13
UK Albums (Official Charts)	5
US Billboard 200	50

== Video compilation ==
A six-track video compilation containing promotional music videos for all five of the singles from the album was released by Virgin Music Video in 1986. Simply titled Scritti Politti, with a total running time of 19 minutes, it also included two versions of the "Wood Beez" video.

=== Track listing ===
1. "Wood Beez (Pray Like Aretha Franklin)" – 3:36 (director: John Scarlett-Davies)
2. "Absolute" – 3:47 (director: John Scarlett-Davies)
3. "Hypnotize" – 3:30 (director: Peter Care)
4. "The Word Girl" – 3:16 (director: John Scarlett-Davies)
5. "Perfect Way" – (director: Paula Greif and Peter Kagan)
6. "Wood Beez (Pray Like Aretha Franklin)" US version – 3:36 (director: Jean-Baptiste Mondino)
