= Provision (album) =

Studio album by Scritti Politti
- Released: 6 June 1988
- Recorded: 1987–1988
- Studios: Minot Sound; Atlantic (New York); Hit Factory (New York); Right Track (New York); Sorcerer Sound (New York); Britannia Row (London); AIR (London); Townhouse (London); Sarm West (London); Swan Yard (London)
- Genres: Dance-pop; electro-funk; sophisti-pop; synth-pop; blue-eyed soul; pop
- Length: 39:33 (LP); 53:14 (CD)
- Labels: Virgin (UK); Warner Bros. (US)
- Producers: Green Gartside; David Gamson (except "Best Thing Ever", co-produced with John Potoker)

Scritti Politti chronology
Cupid & Psyche 85 (1985)	Provision (1988)	Anomie & Bonhomie (1999)

Singles from Provision
- 1. "Oh Patti (Don't Feel Sorry for Loverboy)" Released: April 1988; 2. "First Boy in This Town (Lovesick)" Released: August 1988; 3. "Boom! There She Was" Released: November 1988

Professional ratings
Review scores
Source	Rating
AllMusic	2/5 stars
Robert Christgau	C+
Smash Hits	6.5/10

Provision is the third studio album by the British pop band Scritti Politti, released in the UK on 6 June 1988 by Virgin Records, approximately three years after the band's commercial breakthrough, the album Cupid & Psyche 85 (1985).

Provision was Scritti Politti's second top ten hit in the UK, peaking at No. 8 on the UK Albums Chart, and was certified Gold by the BPI for 100,000 copies shipped. Three singles were taken from the album, but only "Oh Patti (Don't Feel Sorry for Loverboy)" reached the UK Top 40, peaking at No. 13 in May 1988. "First Boy in This Town (Lovesick)" peaked at No. 63 in August 1988, and "Boom! There She Was" peaked at No. 55 in the UK in November 1988, but reached No. 12 on the US Billboard Dance Club Songs chart, and No. 53 on the US Billboard Hot 100 chart.

The album was nominated for the Grammy Award for Best Engineered Album, Non-Classical.

== Background ==
The track "Oh Patti (Don't Feel Sorry for Loverboy)" features Miles Davis on trumpet; Davis's 1986 album Tutu had included a cover of Scritti Politti's "Perfect Way" from Cupid & Psyche 85. (A longer version of Davis's trumpet solo can be heard in the extended mix of "Oh Patti".) The tracks "Boom! There She Was" and "Sugar and Spice" feature Roger Troutman on talk box vocals. The track "Best Thing Ever" was previously released on the soundtrack of the 1987 film Who's That Girl. In an interview with David Gamson, he stated that "Provision took an incredibly long time to make. The initial drum tracks were all recorded with the Synclavier and at that point the Synclav's sequencer was extremely primitive. Lots of inputing kick and snare hits via SMPTE numbers rather than beats and bars. Ultimately, I think we kinda lost the forest for the trees on that album."

Green Gartside's health was deteriorating before and after Provision was recorded. Gartside recalled in 2011, "Promoting Cupid & Psyche knocked chunks out of my already fragile psyche... I was in a poor state, physically and psychologically. I was living in various hotels and apartments in America. Cocaine was briefly a problem. After promoting Provision, that's when the complete collapse happened."

Interviewed in 2021, Gartside recalled,

I don't think I was the full fucking shilling when Provision was made and I certainly wasn't afterwards... I crawled from my hospital bed to film "Boom! There She Was" and returned to hospital when it was finished... I was really out of it. Management were very upset and angry about having to film it, because I was too ill to get through it. We had one attempt to get it right. I'd wanted to present Scritti as a party like Morris Day And The Time's performances. It was probably how we'd have presented ourselves if we'd done any concerts at the time, but my health was so precarious by then. I went straight back to hospital and from there to live the life of a hermit in the Welsh countryside for a good few years."

After Provision, Gartside would release a couple of new Scritti Politti singles in 1991, and also contribute vocals to the BEF album Music of Quality and Distinction - Volume Two, but would not release another Scritti Politti album for eleven years (1999's Anomie & Bonhomie).

== Critical reception ==
Provision received mixed reviews upon release. Smash Hits magazine gave the album 6.5 out of 10, and stated "The songs on Provision still twinkle one's toes like nobody's business, especially "First Boy In This Town" and "Bam Salute". But though Green always writes extremely clever, dreamy, crisp songs, there's nothing here - apart from the current single "Oh Patti" - to suggest that Green will be having too many pop hits over the next few months.

In a retrospective review, Stephen Thomas Erlewine of AllMusic gave it two out of five stars, saying: "To be certain, it's a pleasant listen, and several tracks are pretty entertaining, but the music is so lightweight and Green Gartside's voice is so thin that the album virtually disappears into thin air, leaving behind no impression. That is, of course, with the exception of the unresolved question of why on earth Miles Davis contributed a trumpet solo to "Oh Patti." According to Keyboard magazine, "much of the album bears Gamson's stamp. In fact, his handiwork shows up in virtually every aspect of the record, from programming to sequencing. His crisp, jabbing patches have a poke-in-the-ribs feel that hustles Scritti songs along, and his intricate sequences have established him as one of the most inventive architects on the current dance-pop scene".

Gamson himself was pleased with Provision at the time of its release, saying it "worked much better because Green and I developed our collaboration...I think things are much better placed on the new album...first off, it isn't so busy". In later years he acknowledged the negative experience of making the album: "It was the most digital sounding analogue record ever made. The most anal sounding record...which is what a lot of people don't like about it... It was one long very exhausting grind... I got physically ill at the end of that record because I was so exhausted". Commenting on the relationships within the band at that time, he said "by that point we hated each other's guts and didn't talk to each other for ten years".

== Promotion ==
Three music videos were made to support the album's three singles, "Boom! There She Was", "First Boy in This Town (Lovesick)" and "Oh Patti (Don't Feel Sorry for Loverboy)". Gartside performed most of the promotion for Provision on his own: Gamson and Fred Maher appeared in the video for the first single, "Oh Patti (Don't Feel Sorry for Loverboy)", but were absent from subsequent videos. "Boom! There She Was" featured Gartside playing the song live with a band in a large concert venue, while "First Boy in This Town (Lovesick)" shows Gartside singing while imagery and videos inspired by the 1950s and 1960s are shown in the background.

== Track listing ==
All songs written by Green Gartside and David Gamson, except where noted.

Side one
No.	Title	Writer(s)	Length
1.	"Boom! There She Was"		5:00
2.	"Overnite"		4:44
3.	"First Boy in This Town (Lovesick)"		4:23
4.	"All That We Are"		3:31
5.	"Best Thing Ever"	Gartside, Gamson, John Potoker	3:51

Side two
No.	Title	Length
6.	"Oh Patti (Don't Feel Sorry for Loverboy)"	4:21
7.	"Bam Salute"	4:33
8.	"Sugar and Spice"	4:11
9.	"Philosophy Now"	4:53

CD and cassette bonus tracks
No.	Title	Length
10.	"Oh Patti (Extended)"	6:32
11.	"Boom! There She Was (Dub)"	7:15

- A song recorded during the Provision sessions, "World Come Back to Life", was released as the B-side of the "First Boy In This Town (Lovesick)" single but was never included on any edition of the Provision album.
- "Oh Patti (Don't Feel Sorry for Loverboy)" and the shorter US mix of "Boom! There She Was" were later included in the compilation album Absolute: The Best of Scritti Politti (2011).

== Personnel ==
Scritti Politti

- Green Gartside – vocals, guitars (3), vocal arrangements (3)
- David Gamson – keyboards, drum programming, arrangements
- Fred Maher – drums, drum programming, timbales (5)

Additional personnel

- John Mahoney – Synclavier programming
- Raymond Niznik – Synclavier programming
- Jason Miles – additional keyboard programming (5)
- Dann Huff – guitars (1, 4, 6–9)
- Roger Troutman – talk box (1, 8)
- Nick Moroch – guitars (5)
- Marcus Miller – bass guitar (1, 7–9)
- Bashiri Johnson – percussion (5, 7–9), timbales (7, 9), congas (9)
- Mitch Corn – horns (5)
- Joe Mennonna – horns (5)
- Andy Snitzer – saxophones (7, 9)
- Michael Davis – trombone (7, 9)
- Miles Davis – trumpet (6)
- Chris Botti – trumpet (7, 9)
- Kent Smith – trumpet (7, 9)
- Tawatha Agee – backing vocals (1, 2, 5, 7, 8)
- B.J. Nelson – backing vocals (1–5, 7–9)
- Fonzi Thornton – backing vocals (1–4, 7, 8)
- Rory Dodd – backing vocals (3, 4, 6, 9)
- Eric Troyer – backing vocals (3, 4, 6, 9), vocal arrangements (3, 6)
- Diva Gray – backing vocals (5)
- Yogi Lee – backing vocals (5)
- Mark Stevens – backing vocals (5)

== Production ==
- David Gamson – producer
- Green Gartside – producer, sleeve design
- John Potoker – co-producer (5), engineer (5), drum sample recording
- Ray Bardani – engineer (1–4, 6–9), mixing (1–3, 5, 7, 8)
- Mike Shipley – mixing (4, 6)
- Michael O'Reilly – recording for Miles Davis (6)
- Mike Shipley – mixing (4, 6)
- Julian Mendelsohn – mixing (9)
- Claude Achille – assistant engineer
- Stuart Breed – assistant engineer
- Graham Meek – assistant engineer
- Hugo Nicholson – assistant engineer
- Arabella Rodriguez – assistant engineer
- Bunt Stafford-Clark – additional tape editing
- Howard Gray – additional tape editing
- Tony Cousins – mastering at Townhouse Studios
- Susie McKinley – production coordinator
- Keith Breeden – sleeve design
- Juergen Teller – sleeve design, objects photography
- Andy Catlin – group photography
- Lawrence Lawry – group photography
- Robert Warr at Partisan Management Ltd. – management

== Charts ==
Chart (1988)	Position
Australia (Kent Music Report)	96
UK Albums Chart	8
U.S. Billboard 200	113

== Certifications ==
Certifications for Provision
Region	Certification	Certified units/sales
United Kingdom (BPI)	Gold	100,000^{^}
^{^} Shipments figures based on certification alone.
