= The "Sweetest Girl" =

1981 single by Scritti Politti

"The 'Sweetest Girl'"

Single by Scritti Politti

from the album Songs to Remember
- B-side: "Lions After Slumber" (UK, US, Germany); "Confidence" (France, Japan)
- Released: October 1981
- Genre: New wave; reggae; art pop; sophisti-pop; lovers rock
- Length: 4:37 (single version); 6:18 (album version)
- Label: Rough Trade
- Songwriter: Green Gartside
- Producers: Adam Kidron; Scritti Politti

Scritti Politti singles chronology
"4 A-Sides" (1979)	"The 'Sweetest Girl'" (1981)	"Faithless" (1982)

Official audio
- "The Sweetest Girl" (2001 Remaster) on YouTube

"The 'Sweetest Girl'" is a song written by the Welsh singer Green Gartside. It was originally performed by Gartside's band Scritti Politti, and released in October 1981 as a single. The single peaked at No. 64 in the UK singles chart. The keyboards were played by Robert Wyatt.

The song became a marginally bigger hit five years later, when covered by ska and pop band Madness. Their version of the song peaked at No. 35 in the UK and No. 29 in Ireland in early 1986. Madness changed the title of the song slightly, losing both the definite article and the quotation marks around the last two words in "The 'Sweetest Girl'", thereby rendering it as "Sweetest Girl".

== Background ==
The "Sweetest Girl" was a radical departure from Scritti Politti's "low tech homemade aesthetic" in favour of "expensive studio production" as noted in the BBC documentary "Do it Yourself: The Story of Rough Trade" (2006). Rough Trade producer Mayo Thompson stated the single cost £60,000 to produce. The "Sweetest Girl" was released in October 1981 and peaked at number 64 on the UK singles chart. It was not a financial success, which led to worsening financial difficulties at Rough Trade. The label would avoid bankruptcy after the success of Manchester band the Smiths.

== Scritti Politti version ==
=== Artwork ===
As with the cover artwork for all of the singles from Songs to Remember (1982), "The 'Sweetest Girl'" pays homage to the packaging of a luxury consumer item, which in this case was Dunhill cigarettes. Gartside claimed that the idea behind the singles' sleeves was to "convey a sense of a common, available thing which is classy, like our records now".

=== Track listing ===
The B-side "Lions After Slumber" takes its title from, and quotes in its final lines from, the 1819 political poem The Masque of Anarchy by Percy Bysshe Shelley.

==== 7" and 12" vinyl (UK, US, Germany) ====
Side one
No.	Title	Length
1.	"The 'Sweetest Girl'"	4:34

Side two
No.	Title	Length
1.	"Lions After Slumber"	4:58

==== 7" vinyl (France, Japan) ====
Side one
No.	Title	Length
1.	"The 'Sweetest Girl'"	4:37

Side two
No.	Title	Length
1.	"Confidence"	3:04

== Personnel ==
- Robert Wyatt – keyboards
- Green Gartside – vocals, guitar
- Joe Cang – bass
- Nial Jinks – bass
- Lorenza, Mae, Jackie – chorus
- Tom Morley – LinnDrum
- Jamie Talbot – saxophone ("Lions After Slumber")

== Madness version ==
"Sweetest Girl"

Single by Madness

from the album Mad Not Mad
- B-side: "Jennie (A Portrait Of)"
- Released: 10 February 1986
- Genre: Reggae; pop
- Length: 4:20 (single version); 5:46 (album version); 7:01 (dub mix); 6:34 (extended mix)
- Label: Zarjazz
- Songwriter: Green Gartside
- Producers: Clive Langer; Alan Winstanley

Madness singles chronology
"Uncle Sam" (1985)	"Sweetest Girl" (1986)	"(Waiting For) The Ghost Train" (1986)

Music video
- Madness – "Sweetest Girl" on YouTube

The cover of the song by the ska and pop band Madness was included on their sixth studio album Mad Not Mad (1985), and released as a single the following year. The song spent six weeks on the UK Singles Chart, peaking at No. 35. Whilst reflecting on the Mad Not Mad album, the band's lead vocalist Suggs said that "The Sweetest Girl" was my idea – let’s get really serious and take a song that we don't even understand." The band's parent label, Virgin Records, were more enthusiastic about its release as a single than the band were, as the band wished to release the album's opening track, "I'll Compete", as a single instead.

=== Music video ===
The song's music video was featured in the 1986 BBC Omnibus documentary Video Jukebox.

=== Critical reception ===
Upon its release as a single, Simon Witter of NME noted how Suggs' "slightly monotone delivery is bolstered by gorgeous harmonies and an inventive rearrangement". He predicted the song would be a hit. Dave Rimmer of Smash Hits described it as "a rather strained version of the first decent song Scritti Politti ever wrote" and added that it "limps and stumbles all the way through". Frank Hopkinson of Number One commented, "The record's light, slow with subtle changes of pace and Suggs singing at his most plaintive."

=== Track listing ===
==== 7" vinyl ====
Side one
No.	Title	Writer(s)	Length
1.	"Sweetest Girl"	Green Gartside	4:20

- Horns:- Gary Barnacle
- Backing Vocals:- Afrodiziak

Side two
No.	Title	Writer(s)	Length
1.	"Jennie (A Portrait Of)"	Lee Thompson; Daniel Woodgate	3:24

==== 12" vinyl ====
Side one
No.	Title	Writer(s)	Length
1.	"Sweetest Girl" (Dub Mix)	Gartside	7:01

Side two
No.	Title	Writer(s)	Length
1.	"Sweetest Girl" (Extended Mix)	Gartside	6:34
2.	"Jennie (A Portrait Of)"	Thompson; Woodgate	3:05

=== Charts ===
Chart (1986)	Peak position
UK Singles Chart	35
Irish Singles Chart	29

== Bibliography ==
- Young, Rob (2006). Rough Trade. Black Dog Publishing. ISBN 978-1-904772-47-7.
