= Green Gartside =

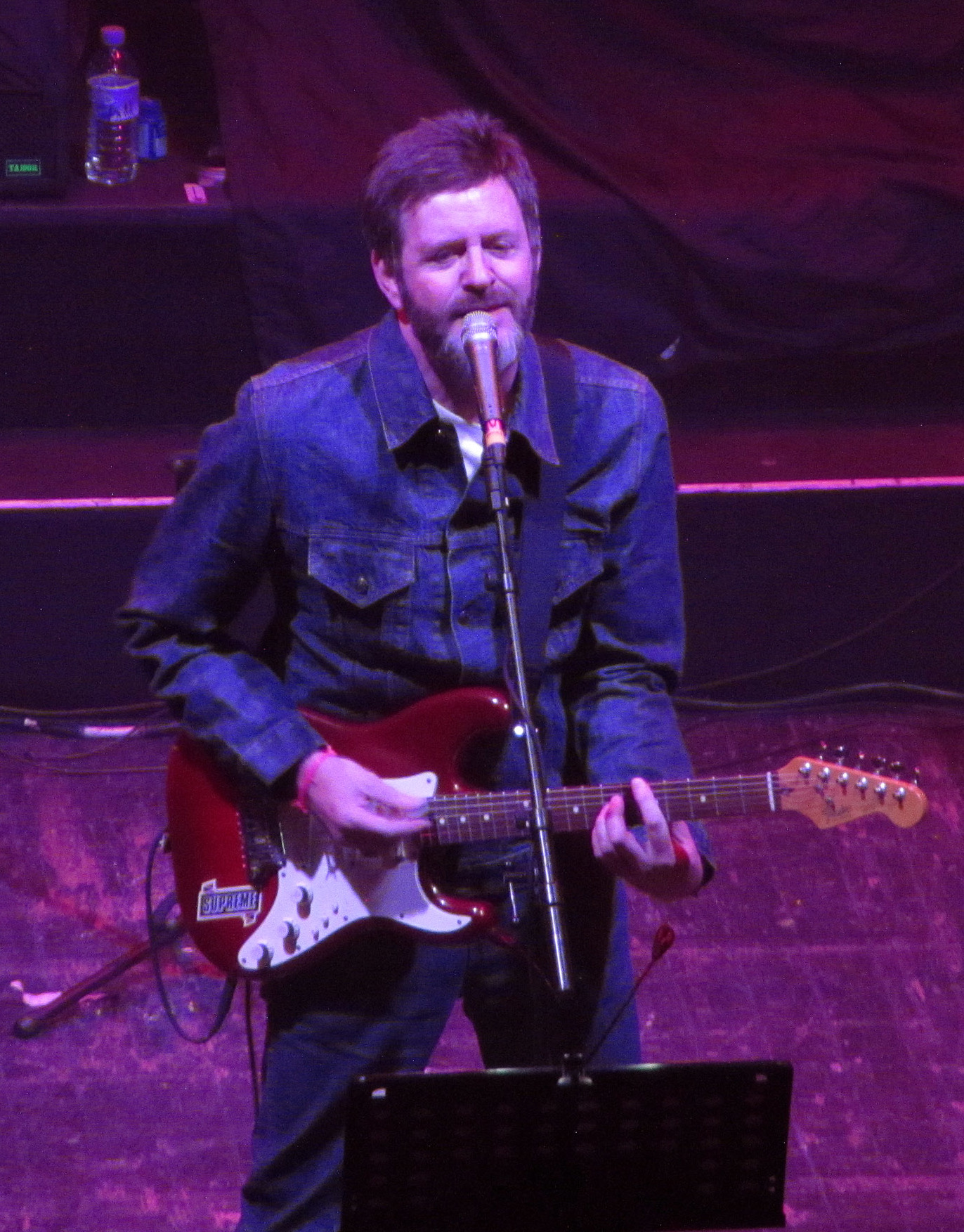
- Gartside performing live at Brixton Academy in London, 2014

Background information
- Born: Paul Julian Strohmeyer; 22 June 1955 (age 71)
- Origin: Cardiff, Wales
- Genres: New wave; post-punk; synthpop; blue-eyed soul; post-disco; pop-funk; boogie
- Occupations: Singer; songwriter; musician
- Instruments: Vocals; guitar
- Years active: 1977–1991; 1999–present
- Labels: Rough Trade; Warner Bros.; Virgin
- Member of: Scritti Politti

Green Gartside (born Paul Julian Strohmeyer; 22 June 1955) is a Welsh singer, songwriter and musician. He is the frontman of the British band Scritti Politti.

== Early life ==
Gartside was born on 22 June 1955 in Cardiff, Wales, to a "Cup-a-Soup salesman dad and a hairdresser / secretary / whatever mum". His childhood was not always happy, with the family, which included a sister, having to move every twelve months or so because of his father's job. The family ended up "living all over [Wales], from Bridgend to Newport to Ystrad Mynach". His father died while he was a child and his widowed mother married her boss, a solicitor from Newport named Gordon Gartside, from whom he adopted his new surname. Gartside recalls, "The 'Green' bit came about because I didn't like the fact there were two other Pauls in my class and I wanted something different. So I just chose something random after listening to a Captain Beefheart album where all the musicians were named odd things like Zoot Horn Rollo. I thought having a made-up name was well cool".

Gartside attended Croesyceiliog Grammar School in Cwmbran. At the age of 14, he formed a branch of the Young Communist League, along with his schoolfriend and future Scritti Politti bassist Nial Jinks. He later completed a foundation course in Art at Newport Art College. and formed a band called Heads of the Valleys.

In the mid-1970s, Gartside moved to England to study Fine Art at Leeds Polytechnic.

== Career ==
Green Gartside: The record is an art form by its own.

While at art school in Leeds in 1977, Gartside formed the post-punk band Scritti Politti with schoolmate and friend Nial Jinks and art school friend Tom Morley. After Gartside and Morley had left Leeds Polytechnic, they moved to London, later securing a recording contract with Rough Trade Records who released Scritti Politti's debut studio album Songs to Remember in September 1982. Subsequent Scritti Politti studio albums featured Gartside with different personnel, with Gartside being the only constant member of the group. In 1983, Gartside provided guest vocals on Eurythmics's cover version of the Sam & Dave song "Wrap It Up" from their second studio album Sweet Dreams (Are Made of This).

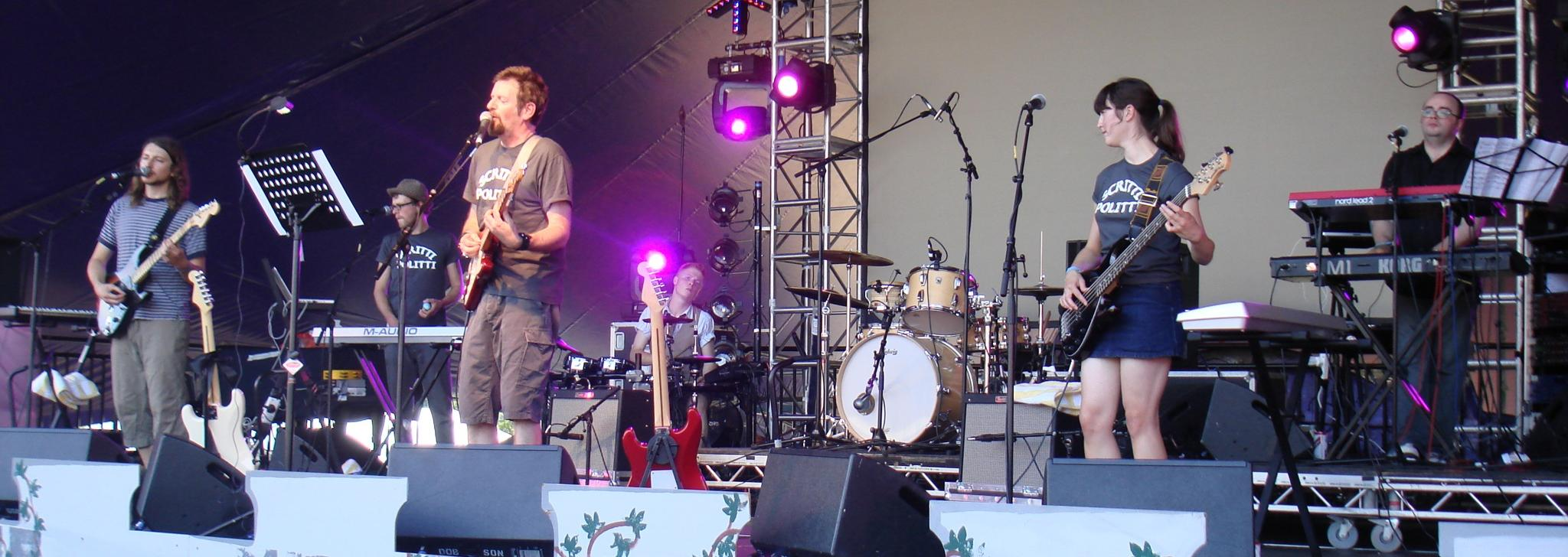
Scritti Politti performing live at Big Chill 2006

As Scritti Politti, Gartside and New Yorkers keyboardist David Gamson and drummer Fred Maher released the band's second studio album Cupid & Psyche 85 in June 1985. The album included hits "Wood Beez (Pray Like Aretha Franklin)" (to the music video for which Michael Clark lent his contemporary dance); "Absolute" (the music video being based on William Shakespeare's A Midsummer Night's Dream); "The Word Girl"; "Perfect Way"; and "Hypnotize". Released on Virgin Records, it reached number 5 in the UK and was certified gold by the British Phonographic Industry (BPI) for 100,000 copies sold. It was produced by Scritti Politti and Turkish-born Arif Mardin who coincidentally had also produced Aretha Franklin, one of Gartside's musical influences.

Released in June 1988, Scritti Politti's third studio album Provision was a UK top 10 success, though it only produced one UK top 20 hit single, "Oh Patti (Don't Feel Sorry for Loverboy)". After releasing a couple of non-album singles in 1991, as well as a collaboration with B.E.F., Gartside became disillusioned with the music industry and retired to South Wales for more than seven years.

In the early to mid-1990s, Gartside lived alone in a secluded cottage in Usk, Monmouthshire, spending his time listening to hip hop, playing darts and drinking beer at his local pub The Nags Head Inn. He returned to music-making in the late 1990s, releasing a new studio album, Anomie & Bonhomie, in 1999 (which included various rap and hip hop influences).

In 2006, another new studio album was released by Gartside, the stripped-down White Bread Black Beer by Scritti Politti, which returned to the more experimental era of the band's history. He also returned to touring, including his first ever tour of the United States with his band Scritti Politti.

In 2012 Gartside, who has suffered from recurring stage fright that prevented Scritti Politti from touring for many years, performed several songs by folk rock singer Sandy Denny of Fairport Convention as part of a tribute called The Lady in several UK cities.

In 2015 he was awarded an Honorary Fellowship from Goldsmiths, University of London. He has been a regular stand-in presenter on BBC Radio 6 Music.

Gartside has also worked with Miles Davis, Chaka Khan, Eurythmics, Elvis Costello, Shabba Ranks, Mos Def, Meshell Ndegeocello, Kylie Minogue, Robyn Hitchcock, Manic Street Preachers, Tracey Thorn, and Robert Wyatt (on Songs to Remember).

In 2020 Gartside released a solo single on Rough Trade Records, which featured cover versions of "Tangled Man" and "Wishing Well" by folk singer Anne Briggs.

In 2026 he was featured singing on the song "Hold Onto Today", the sixth track on the album Ever The Optimist by Trashcan Sinatras.

== See also ==
- List of Welsh musicians
