= Deron Johnson (musician) =

American musician

Background information
- Origin: Los Angeles
- Genres: Jazz
- Website: Facebook page

Deron Johnson is an American jazz keyboardist. Beginning at the age of sixteen, Johnson became hooked on jazz music and attended California State University, Long Beach where he continued his pursuit with private lessons from Billy Childs. In 1991, after touring with pop idol Paula Abdul, Johnson was discovered by the trumpeter Miles Davis. Johnson completed three European tours and two American tours with Davis before he died, and recorded the keyboards on his last CD Doo-Bop (1992). Johnson then toured extensively and recorded with jazz bassist Stanley Clarke and alto saxophonist David Sanborn. In 1996, Johnson began to focus on original projects, along with more touring and more recordings with artists including Alanis Morissette, Boz Scaggs, and Seal.

Johnson has continued to write and record for television and began recording his first solo album Learning to Crawl. He has also composed music for several QCODE podcasts, eventually becoming its Head of Music in 2020.

== Discography ==
Year	Artist	Album	Credit
1992	Foley	7 Years Ago...	Piano, Keyboards
1992	Karl Denson	Blackened Red Snapper	Piano
1992	George Howard (jazz)	Do I Ever Cross Your Mind?	Synthesizer, Bass, Arranger, Keyboards, Producer, Fender Rhodes, Synthesizer Bass, Keyboard Programming
1992	Miles Davis	Doo Bop	Keyboards
1992	Louis Verdieu	Louis	Piano
1993	Stanley Clarke	East River Drive	Keyboards
1993	Karl Denson	Herbal Turkey Breast	Piano
1993	Stanley Clarke	Live at the Greek	Keyboards, Performer
1993	George Howard (jazz)	When Summer Comes	Piano
1994	Gerald Alston	First Class Only	Piano
1994	George Howard (jazz)	Home Far Away	Piano, Organ, Keyboards
1995	Jimmy Earl	Jimmy Earl	Fender Rhodes
1996	Miles Davis	Live Around the World	Keyboards
1996	Various Artists	New Spirits in Jazz	Piano (electric)
1997	Various Artists	Bass Talk, Vol. 4: Who's Afraid of the Big Bad Bass?	Piano (electric), Fender Rhodes
1997	Monica Behan	Behan/Johnson	Arranger, Vocals (background), Multi Instruments, Producer, Orchestration, Drum Programming
1997	Various Artists	Hotwired	
1997	Michael White	Side by Side	Piano, Keyboards
1997	Pino Daniele	Dimmi cosa succede sulla terra	Piano, Keyboards, Organ (Hammond)
1998	Pino Daniele	The Best of Pino Daniele: Yes I Know My Way	
1998	Stanley Clarke	This is Jazz, Vol. 41	Keyboards
1999	Alanis Morissette	Alanis Unplugged	Keyboards, Background Vocals
1999	Howard Shore	Dogma (Original Soundtrack)	Organ, Celeste, Cello, Harmonium
1999	Other Sisters	Original Soundtrack	Keyboards
1999	Jimmy Earl	Stratosphere	Piano
2000	Stanley Clarke	Portrait Stanley Clarke	Keyboards
2000	Miles Davis	Tutu/Amandla/Doo-Bop	
2001	Larry Carlton	Deep Into It	Organ
2001	Dean Brown	Here	Organ (Hammond), Fender Rhodes
2002	Carly Simon	Christmas Is Almost Here Again [Bonus Tracks]	Synthesizer
2002	Carly Simon	Christmas Is Almost Here	Synthesizer
2002	Miles Davis	Complete Miles Davis at Montreux 1973-1991	Keyboards
2003	Gabriel Gordon	Gypsy Living	Synthesizer, Piano, Organ (Hammond), Clavinet, Moog Synthesizer, Fender Rhodes, Wurlitzer
2003	Phil Roy	Issues + Options	Piano (electric)
2003	Rayford Griffin	Rebirth of the Cool	Keyboards
2004	Seal	Best: 1991-2004 [2 Disc]	Piano, Celeste, Harpsichord, Organ (Hammond), Vibraphone, Organ (Pump), Hammond B3
2004	Seal	Best: 1991-2004 [3 Disc]	Piano, Celeste, Harpsichord, Organ (Hammond), Vibraphone, Organ (Pump)
2004	Seal	Best: 1991-2004 [DVD Audio]	Piano, Celeste, Harpsichord, Organ (Hammond), Vibraphone, Organ (Pump), Musician
2004	Stanley Clarke	Trios: East River Drive/Schooldays/Live at the Greek	Keyboards
2005	Self Scientific	Change	Fender Rhodes
2005	Poptart Monkeys	Happily Never After	Keyboards
2005	Seal	Live in Paris [DVD]	Keyboards
2005	Seal	Live in Paris	Keyboards
2005	George Howard (jazz)	Very Best of George Howard	Keyboards, Fender Rhodes, Synthesizer Bass
2006	Stanley Clarke	Bass Days	Keyboards
2006	Alexi Murdoch	Time Without Consequence	Fender Rhodes
2007	Chris Pierce	Walking on the Earth (Album)	Hammond B3, Wurlitzer, Fender Rhodes
2007	Leni Stern	Alu Mayé (Have You Heard)	Fender Rhodes
2007	Miles Davis	Very Best of the Warner Bros. Sessions 1985-1991	Keyboards
2008	Beth Hirsch	Wholehearted	Piano, Keyboards, Fender Rhodes
2008	Eric Hutchinson	Sounds Like This	Synthesizer, Piano, Wurlitzer, Soloist
2008	Alyssa	Within	Synthesizer, Guitar, Piano, Arranger, Organ (Hammond), Programming, Producer, Wurlitzer
2009	Chris Pierce	Chris Pierce Live at the Hotel Cafe	Hammond B3, Wurlitzer, Fender Rhodes
2009	Hyperstory	Hyperstory	Piano, Clavinet, Fender Rhodes
2009	Chantelle Berry	Simple Things	Keyboards
2010	Stereofox	Ice the Symphony	Keyboards, Guitar, Piano, Fender Rhodes, Producer
2012	Joshua	Listen EP	Keyboards, Programming, Producer
2013	Joshua	Joshua EP	Keyboards, Programming
2021	Lady Blackbird	Black Acid Soul	Piano, Mellotron, Casio Synth
2023	Chris Pierce	Let All Who Will	Piano, Fender Rhodes
