= List of certified jazz recordings =

This is a list of certified jazz recordings, which also represents best-selling jazz recordings.

== Jazz recordings ==
=== Studio albums ===
List of studio albums, with details and certifications
Title	Artist	Details	Certifications
Blue Train	John Coltrane	Released: January 1958; Recorded: September 15, 1957; Label: Blue Note; Format: LP	US: Gold; MC: Gold; ITA: Platinum; UK: Gold
Porgy and Bess	Miles Davis	Released: 1959; Recorded: July 22, 1958 – August 18, 1958; Label: Columbia; Format: LP	UK: Silver
Kind of Blue	Miles Davis	Released: August 17, 1959; Recorded: March 2, 1959 – April 22, 1959; Label: Columbia; Format: LP, Reel Tape	US: 5× Platinum; AUS: 2× Platinum; BEA: Gold; DEN: Gold; FRA: Platinum; ITA: 2× Platinum; NVPI: Silver; ZPAV: Platinum; UK: 2× Platinum
Giant Steps	John Coltrane	Released: February 1960; Recorded: May 4, 1959 – December 2, 1959; Label: Atlantic; Format: LP	US: Gold
Sketches of Spain	Miles Davis	Released: July 18, 1960; Recorded: November 15, 1959 – November 20, 1959; Label: Columbia; Format: LP, Reel Tape	US: Platinum; UK: Gold
My Favorite Things	John Coltrane	Released: March 1961; Recorded: October 21, 1960 – October 26, 1960; Label: Atlantic; Format: LP	US: Gold
Getz/Gilberto	Stan Getz and João Gilberto	Released: March 1964; Recorded: March 18–19, 1963; Label: Verve; Format: LP	US: Gold; MC: Gold; DEN: Platinum; ITA: Gold
A Love Supreme	John Coltrane	Released: January 1965; Recorded: December 9, 1964; Label: Impulse!; Format: LP	US: Platinum; ITA: Gold; UK: Gold
In a Silent Way	Miles Davis	Released: July 30, 1969; Recorded: February 18, 1969; Label: Columbia; Format: LP	UK: Gold
Bitches Brew	Miles Davis	Released: April 1970; Recorded: August 19, 1969 – January 28, 1970; Label: Columbia; Format: LP, Reel Tape, 8 Track Tape	US: Platinum; UK: Gold
Tutu	Miles Davis	Released: December 1986; Recorded: January 6, 1986 – March 25, 1986; Label: Warner Bros.; Format: LP, CD, CS	FRA: Gold
Doo-Bop	Miles Davis	Released: June 30, 1992; Recorded: January 19, 1991 – February 1991; Label: Warner Bros.; Format: LP, CD, CS	GER: Gold

=== Live albums ===
List of live albums, with details and certifications
Title	Artist	Details	Certifications
Miles & Quincy Live at Montreux	Miles Davis	Released: 1993; Recorded: July 8, 1991; Label: Warner Bros.; Format: CD, CS	GER: Gold
Live Around the World	Miles Davis	Released: May 14, 1996; Recorded: August 1988-August 1991; Label: Warner Bros.; Format: LP, CD, CS	GER: Gold

=== Compilation albums ===
List of compilation albums, with details and certifications
Title	Artist	Details	Certifications
Birth of the Cool	Miles Davis	Released: 1957; Recorded: January 21, 1949 – March 9, 1950; Label: Capitol; Format: LP	UK: Silver
Miles Davis Story	Miles Davis	Released: 1991; Label: Columbia; Format: LP, CD, CS	FRA: Gold
