= That's What Happened: Live in Germany 1987 =

That's What Happened

Video by Miles Davis
- Released: 2009
- Recorded: 1987
- Venues: Gasteig (Munich, West Germany)
- Genre: Jazz fusion
- Length: 115 DVD
- Label: Eagle Eye Media

That's What Happened: Live in Germany 1987 is a 98-minute DVD by Miles Davis, comprising a concert and interview, recorded in Munich, West Germany, in 1987, and released by Eagle Eye Media in 2009.

== Description ==
The concert was recorded on July 18, 1987, at the Gasteig Philharmonie, Munich, by the ZDF.

A review in JazzTimes by Jeff Tamarkin describes the music, mostly taken from Davis's studio albums You're Under Arrest and Tutu, as typical of Davis in the last part of his career, playing, in the same show, "exhilarating, highly charged funk jams, dark and mysterious blues and syrupy sweet, empty-calorie schmaltz". Tamarking noted that the Cyndi Lauper cover "Time After Time" elicits the most enthusiastic response from the audience, because it's the first time in the show that Davis solos at length and accessibly. Of the individual players, Tamarkin says that Kenny Garrett does most of the "heavy lifting", bassist Darryl Jones "cooks", and Foley, on lead bass, can "shred with the best" lead guitarist.

== Track listing ==
No.	Title	Length
1.	"Medley ('One Phone Call'; 'Street Scenes'; 'That's What Happened')"
2.	"New Blues"
3.	"Human Nature"
4.	"Tutu"
5.	"Time After Time"
6.	"Portia"

== Personnel ==
- Miles Davis – trumpet
- Kenny Garrett – alto saxophone, flute
- Adam Holzman – keyboards
- Robert Irving III – keyboards
- Darryl Jones – electric bass
- Joseph "Foley" McCreary – electric bass ("lead bass")
- Ricky Wellman – drums
- Mino Cinélu – percussion
