= Merci Miles! Live at Vienne =

Live album by Miles Davis
- Released: June 25, 2021
- Recorded: July 1, 1991
- Venue: Jazz à Vienne, Vienne, France
- Genre: Jazz
- Length: 80:21
- Label: Rhino; Warner
- Producer: Ashley Kahn; Florence Joelle Halfon; Vince Wilburn, Jr.

Miles Davis chronology
Rubberband (2019)	Merci Miles! Live at Vienne (2021)	Turnaround (2023)

Miles Davis live chronology
Miles in Paris (1989)	Merci Miles! Live at Vienne (1991)	Miles & Quincy Live at Montreux (1991)

Merci Miles! Live at Vienne is a live album by American jazz trumpeter Miles Davis, released on Rhino and Warner Records in 2021. It was recorded in 1991 at the Jazz à Vienne festival.

The album was released as part of Rhino's celebration of Black Music Month.

== Recording ==
The album was recorded at the Théâtre antique de Vienne on July 1, 1991, the opening night of the Jazz à Vienne festival. The set included interpretations of songs by pop musicians Michael Jackson, Cyndi Lauper, and Prince. Davis died less than three months later, making this one of his final live performances.

== Critical reception ==
Professional ratings
Review scores
Source	Rating
AllMusic	3.5/5 stars
All About Jazz	3/5 stars

Reviews for the album have been largely positive. Writing for AllMusic, Thom Jurek noted "While none of this music is revelatory, it is intuitive and energetic," and described Davis's playing as "surprisingly muscular" despite the proximity to his death. Tom Moon considered it a quality late-era performance in Davis's career, writing "Where some late Davis performances tended to wander, this one is all show-biz discipline" in his JazzTimes review. In All About Jazz, Ian Patterson noted problems with the sound quality and mixing, but compared Davis's "brooding, melancholy and quite gorgeous" phrasing positively to his performance on Ascenseur pour l'échafaud.

== Track listing ==
Disc 1
No.	Title	Writer(s)	Length
1.	"Hannibal"	Marcus Miller	15:58
2.	"Human Nature"	Steve Porcaro; John Bettis	18:10
3.	"Time After Time"	Cyndi Lauper; Rob Hyman	10:16
4.	"Penetration"	Prince	9:10

Disc 2
No.	Title	Writer(s)	Length
1.	"Wrinkle"	Miles Davis; Zane Giles; Randy Hall; Wayne Linsey	8:35
2.	"Amandla"	Marcus Miller	6:08
3.	"Jailbait"	Prince	5:55
4.	"Finale (Band Only)"	Ricky Wellman	6:09

== Personnel ==
Credits taken from the album's liner notes.

- Miles Davis – trumpet
- Kenny Garrett – saxophone
- Deron Johnson – keyboard
- Foley – lead bass
- Richard Patterson – bass
- Ricky Wellman – drums

== Charts ==
Chart performance for Merci Miles! Live at Vienne
Chart (2021)	Peak position
Belgian Albums (Ultratop Wallonia)	131
French Albums (SNEP)	99
German Albums (Offizielle Top 100)	72
Portuguese Albums (AFP)	34
Swiss Albums (Schweizer Hitparade)	25
