= The Bootleg Series, Vol. 7: That's What Happened 1982–1985 =

The Bootleg Series Vol. 7: That's What Happened 1982–1985

Box set by Miles Davis
- Released: September 16, 2022
- Recorded: 1982–1985
- Genre: Jazz
- Length: 210:00
- Label: Columbia/Legacy
- Producers: Steve Berkowitz; Michael Cuscuna; Richard Seidel

Miles Davis Bootleg Series chronology
The Bootleg Series, Vol. 6: The Final Tour (2018)	The Bootleg Series Vol. 7: That's What Happened 1982–1985 (2022)	Miles In France 1963 & 1964: The Bootleg Series, Vol. 8 (2024)

The Bootleg Series Vol. 7: That's What Happened 1982–1985 is a compilation of recordings by Miles Davis from the 1980s. Released as a three-compact disc box set in 2022, it compiles studio recordings and a live set recorded between 1982 and 1985. It is the seventh installment in the Davis bootleg series on Sony Legacy.

== Content ==
The first two discs contain outtakes from studio sessions for the Columbia albums Star People, Decoy, and You're Under Arrest. All but the last two tracks on the first disc date from the Star People sessions, with those last tracks originating from Decoy on a cassette owned by guitarist John Scofield. The second disc consists of material entirely from sessions for You're Under Arrest.

The third disc contains nine songs recorded live on July 7, 1983 at the Montreal International Jazz Festival, including full versions of two songs released on Decoy. All of the material in the box had been unreleased previously in this form.

Included is a booklet with photographs, essays by Marcus J. Moore and Gregory Tate, as well as reminiscences by musicians Darryl Jones, Marcus Miller, John Scofield, Mike Stern, Vince Wilburn Jr., and Sony Legacy producer Steve Berkowitz.

== Track listing ==
All tracks written by Miles Davis except where indicated. In the booklet liner notes, the live version of "Hopscotch" is credited to Davis and Scofield, where the studio version is to Davis alone.

Disc one
No.	Title	Recording date	Length
1.	"Santana"	January 1 or 2, 1983	13:06
2.	"Minor Ninths, Part 1"	October 20, 1982	3:12
3.	"Minor Ninths, Part 2"	October 20, 1982	4:32
4.	"Celestial Blues, Part 1"	October 20, 1982	8:04
5.	"Celestial Blues, Part 2"	October 20, 1982	4:00
6.	"Celestial Blues, Part 3"	October 20, 1982	5:56
7.	"Remake of OBX Ballad"	October 11, 1982	4:57
8.	"Remake of OBX Ballad" (full studio session)	October 11, 1982	7:15
9.	"Freaky Deaky, Part 1"	June 30, 1983	9:50
10.	"Freaky Deaky, Part 2"	June 30, 1983	5:25

Disc two
No.	Title	Writer(s)	Recording date	Length
1.	"Time After Time" (alternate take)	Cyndi Lauper, Rob Hyman	January 26–29, 1984	5:53
2.	"Time After Time" (full studio session)	Cyndi Lauper, Rob Hyman	January 26–29, 1984	8:57
3.	"Theme from Jack Johnson (Right Off) / Intro"		January 27, 1984	8:30
4.	"Never Loved Like This" (studio session demo)	Miles Davis, Robert Irving III	January 1984	5:00
5.	"Hopscotch (slow)"		December 27, 1984	5:34
6.	"Hopscotch (fast)"		December 27, 1984	7:01
7.	"What's Love Got to Do with It"	Terry Britten, Graham Lyle	December 26, 1984	4:21
8.	"Human Nature" (alternate take)	Steve Porcaro, John Bettis	December 26, 1984	6:00
9.	"Katia" (full studio session)	Miles Davis, Robert Irving III	January 1985	10:24

Disc three
No.	Title	Writer(s)	Length
1.	"Speak (That's What Happened)"	Miles Davis, John Scofield	12:27
2.	"Star People"		9:21
3.	"What It Is"	Miles Davis, John Scofield	6:58
4.	"It Gets Better"		12:25
5.	"Hopscotch"	Miles Davis, John Scofield	7:51
6.	"Star on Cicely"		9:12
7.	"Jean-Pierre"		7:34
8.	"Code 3"		6:36
9.	"Creepin' In"		10:36

== Personnel ==
- Miles Davis — trumpet; synthesizers on discs one and three
- J. J. Johnson — trombone on "Minor Ninths" and "Celestial Blues"
- Bill Evans — soprano and tenor saxophone, flute on "Santana," "Celestial Blues," "Remake of OBX Ballad," and disc three
- Bob Berg — soprano saxophone on "Theme from Jack Johnson," "Hopscotch," "What's Love Got to Do with It," and "Human Nature"
- Robert Irving III — keyboards on disc two; Linn drum programming on "Freaky Deaky"
- John Scofield — electric guitar on "Freaky Deaky," "Time After Time," "Theme from Jack Johnson," "Hopscotch," "What's Love Got to Do with It," "Human Nature," and disc three
- Mike Stern — electric guitar on "Santana," "Celestial Blues," and "Remake of OBX Ballad"
- John McLaughlin — electric guitar on "Katia"
- Darryl Jones – bass on "Freaky Deaky," disc two, and disc three
- Marcus Miller — bass on "Santana," "Celestial Blues," and "Remake of OBX Ballad"
- Al Foster — drums on "Santana," "Celestial Blues," "Remake of OBX Ballad," "Time After Time," "Theme from Jack Johnson," and disc three
- Vince Wilburn Jr. — drums on "Never Loved Like This," "Hopscotch," "What's Love Got to Do with It," "Human Nature," and "Katia"; drum programming, percussion on "Never Loved Like This"
- Mino Cinélu — percussion on disc one except "Minor Ninths" and disc three
- Steve Thornton — percussion on disc two except "Never Loved Like This"
