= Miles in Paris =

1991 live DVD by Miles Davis

Live album by Miles Davis
- Released: July 1, 1991
- Recorded: November 3, 1989
- Venue: Paris Jazz Festival
- Genre: Jazz fusion
- Length: 60:00
- Label: Warner Bros.

Miles Davis chronology
Aura (1989)	Miles in Paris (1991)	Doo-Bop (1992)

Miles Davis live chronology
Live Around the World (1988)	Miles in Paris (1989)	Merci Miles! Live at Vienne (1991)

Miles in Paris is a live DVD by Miles Davis recorded at the Paris Jazz Festival on November 3, 1989. The album includes a cover version of the song “Human Nature”, recorded by Michael Jackson and written by Steve Porcaro of the rock band Toto. Davis performs with Benjamin Rietveld, Foley, John Bigham, Kei Akagi, Kenny Garrett, and Ricky Wellman.

== Track listing ==
All tracks are written by Marcus Miller, unless otherwise noted.

No.	Title	Writer(s)	Length
1.	"Human Nature"	Steve Porcaro
2.	"Amandla"
3.	"Tutu"
4.	"New Blues"	Miles Davis
5.	"Mr. Pastorius"

== Personnel ==
- Miles Davis – trumpet
- Kei Akagi – keyboards
- John Bigham – percussion
- Kenny Garret – saxophone, flute
- Foley – lead bass
- Benjamin Rietveld – bass
- Ricky Wellman – drums
