= Rubberband (Miles Davis album) =

Studio album by Miles Davis
- Released: September 6, 2019
- Recorded: October 1985–January 1986
- Studio: Ameraycan Studios; Utopia Studios (new recordings); The Village (Ledisi Lalah Hathaway, Isaiah Sharkey, and Vince Wilburn Jr.); Dot's Way Recorders (Munyungo Jackson and Vince Wilburn Jr.)
- Genre: Jazz
- Length: 63:11
- Label: Rhino/Warner
- Producer: Zane Giles; Randy Hall; Vince Wilburn Jr.

Miles Davis chronology
| Miles Davis & John Coltrane The Final Tour: The Bootleg Series, Vol. 6 (2018) | Rubberband (2019) | Merci Miles! Live at Vienne (2021) |

Rubberband is the final Miles Davis album, recorded in 1985 and released on Rhino Records and Warner Records on September 6, 2019. The album received mixed to positive reviews.

== Recording and Rubberband EP ==
After leaving long-time record label Columbia Records, Davis signed with Warner Bros. Although the 1985 album was not released in Davis's lifetime, sections of the song "Give it Up" were sampled posthumously in the track "High Speed Chase", from Davis's final album, Doo-Bop, in 1992.

In 2018, an EP of takes of the title track titled Rubberband EP was released:

1. "Rubberband of Life" (Radio Edit) – 4:22
2. "Rubberband of Life" – 5:44
3. "Rubberband of Life" (Instrumental) – 5:44
4. "Rubberband" – 6:12
5. "Rubberband of Life" (Amerigo Gazaway Remix) – 4:41

Versions of "Rubberband of Life" feature vocalist Ledisi.

== Critical reception ==
According to the review aggregator Metacritic, Rubberband received "generally favorable reviews" based on a weighted average score of 63 out of 100 from 11 critic scores. These mixed views may in part stem from a divergent opinion of Davis's 1980s recordings as a whole. As music journalist Rob Shepherd, a fan of the artist's works from that decade, has noted: "Recorded mostly in 1985, the height of Miles Davis’ most critically maligned era, Rubberband is unlikely to be appreciated by one who generally disfavors the artist’s 1980s oeuvre. However, for a listener open to Davis’ music from that period, there is much to enjoy."

== Track listing ==
1. "Rubberband of Life" – 5:43
2. "This Is It" – 4:36
3. "Paradise" – 6:10
4. "So Emotional" – 5:18
5. "Give It Up" – 6:28
6. "Maze" – 4:11
7. "Carnival Time" – 4:24
8. "I Love What We Make Together" – 5:05
9. "See I See" – 4:19
10. "Echoes in Time"/"The Wrinkle" – 9:25
11. "Rubberband" – 6:10

== Personnel ==
- Miles Davis – trumpet, keyboards, synthesizers, bandleader

Additional musicians

- Randy Hall – on "I Love What We Make Together", production on 1985 sessions
- Lalah Hathaway – vocals on "So Emotional"
- Ledisi – vocals on "Rubberband of Life"
- Michael Paulo – tenor, alto, flute
- Mike Stern – lead guitar on “Rubberband"

Technical personnel

- Zane Giles – production on 1985 sessions
- Vince Wilburn Jr. – production for 2019 release

== Charts ==
| Chart (2019) | Peak position |
|---|---|
| Belgian Albums (Ultratop Flanders) | 36 |
| Belgian Albums (Ultratop Wallonia) | 58 |
| French Albums (SNEP) | 39 |
| German Albums (Offizielle Top 100) | 31 |
| Hungarian Albums (MAHASZ) | 9 |
| Italian Albums (FIMI) | 41 |
| Japanese Albums (Oricon) | 24 |
| Polish Albums (ZPAV) | 31 |
| Scottish Albums (OCC) | 25 |
| Spanish Albums (PROMUSICAE) | 45 |
| Swiss Albums (Schweizer Hitparade) | 16 |
| UK Albums (OCC) | 87 |
