= Randy Hall =

American musician

- Born: Chicago, Illinois, United States
- Genres: Disco; R&B; Soul; Funk
- Occupations: Singer; Songwriter; Producer
- Instruments: Vocals; Guitar
- Years active: 1975–present
- Labels: MCA Records; Six Nine Records

Randy Hall is an American singer, guitarist, and record producer who collaborated with Miles Davis during the 1980s. Hall helped Davis arrange The Man with the Horn, and its title track featured lead vocals by Hall, who also played guitar, synthesizer and celesta on the track.

== Career ==
=== Early career ===
Randy Hall grew up in Chicago. His first instrument was the piano, but at the age of 13 he switched to guitar, taking lessons from British jazz guitarist Peter Budd. Despite Budd's best efforts, Hall adopted a playing technique similar to Wes Montgomery, whereby the thumb is used as a pick. Hall can play fast and explosively, as in the opening number "One Phone Call/Street Scenes" on the ESP 2 DVD A Tribute to Miles.

Hall met Miles's nephew (and future drummer) Vince Wilburn Jr in kindergarten and the two became lifelong friends. Wilburn's mother Dorothy, was Miles's sister. The two friends started playing together and at the age of 16 joined a local band called Time, Space and Distance.

That soon gained them a reputation around Chicago, and they did session work for local groups, including the Dells. When Hall and Wilburn were around 17 years old, Pete Cosey, who had played in Miles's band from 1973 to 1975, began giving them lessons. They did gigs with him, festivals, and other events. Pete played bass and Randy played guitar. In 1975, Hall went to study music at the Berklee College of Music in Boston. When Hall returned to Chicago, he joined a new band called Data, which included Wilburn, bassist Richard Patterson, keyboardist Robert Irving III, and saxophonist Glenn Burris. All of these musicians later worked with Miles Davis, with Patterson becoming the last bassist in a Miles Davis band and the others working on Davis' comeback album The Man with the Horn. Irving and Wilburn also joined Davis' band in the 1980s.

Hall, Irving and Wilburn performed with other local musicians, including bassist Darryl Jones (who joined Miles's band in 1983) and guitarist Jean-Paul Bourelly, who played on the Amandla album. In 1979, Data disbanded, and a new band was formed, AL7, which included Hall, Wilburn, Irving, Burris, bassist Felton Crews (who also joined Miles's band) and Hall's sister Saundra, a vocalist.

AL7 performed part-time, their main preoccupation being rehearsing and writing material. They also worked with arranger Tom Washington (known as Tom Tom 84), who was connected with another local band, Earth, Wind & Fire. Tom Tom 84 recorded several demos with AL7, including a track called "Space," which had been written by Robert Irving III.

=== Collaboration with Miles Davis ===
Miles Davis's record label, Columbia Records, flew four of the AL7 band members - Hall, Wilburn, Crews, and Irving - from Chicago to New York City, booked them iton a top-flight hotel and arranged recording sessions. Glenn Burris later joined the four, and although he was at many of the sessions, he did not play. Instead, the four Chicago musicians were joined by a young saxophonist Bill Evans, who had been recommended to Miles by ex-band member Dave Liebman.

The musicians worked on the music at Miles's house most days and in the studio and recorded more than a dozen tracks, although Davis did not play on any of them at that stage. One of them was "Shout," a disco-funk track written by Hall, Irving, and Burris. Another was "The Man with the Horn," a tribute ballad to Miles written by Hall and Irving, which became the title track for Davis's comeback album. Randy Hall also played guitar, synthesiser and celeste on the track.

The release of The Man with the Horn gave Hall a lot of exposure and as a result of his singing on the title track, he was invited to join the soul/funk band Pleasure. Occasionally, Hall was asked by Miles Davis to compose some songs.

=== Post-Miles Davis ===
After leaving Pleasure, Hall carved out a successful career as an artist/producer and in 1984, he released a solo album, I Belong to You, produced by Ray Parker Jr. (of Raydio and "Ghostbusters" fame). The album included contributions from Irving, Wilburn, Crews and Burris. In 1985, Hall was in Ray Parker Jr's studio (Ameraycan) in Los Angeles, recording a follow-up solo album, Love You Like A Stranger. Once again, Crews and Irving were involved in the sessions. Meanwhile, Miles had left Columbia Records after almost thirty years and signed with Warner Bros. Records, with Warner's head of jazz Tommy LiPuma given the responsibility of handling Miles's musical development. During the initial stages, LiPuma was happy for Miles to choose his own musical direction. Miles decided that he wanted Hall to produce his first album for Warner Bros.

Hall decided to work with a number of people from the Love You Like A Stranger sessions on the new Miles Davis album. One of these people was Atalla Zane Giles, who had played guitar, keyboards, bass and sang on the album. Giles was asked to compose, arrange and produce the new album with Hall. Engineer Reggie Dozier was asked to join the project, as were keyboardist Adam Holzman (who later joined Davis's band), bassist Cornelius Mims, percussionist Steve Reid, Burris and Wilburn. More than a dozen tunes were recorded during the sessions, which took place between October 1985 and January 1986, and the plan was to release an album called Rubberband. One of the tracks was called "Give It Up," the same name as a hit tune for Pleasure. The Rubberband material was not released until 2019.

Davis later worked with Marcus Miller to record Tutu. Davis's performances from a couple of the Rubberband sessions were used to create new tracks on the Doo-Bop album. Two tunes from the Rubberband sessions were due to appear on a retrospective set called The Last Word, but were ultimately not included.

In more recent years, Hall has been working with Elliott Small. Hall produced, wrote the music, and played piano and guitar on Small's album This Season's Collection. Hall also wrote the lyrics for two songs on the album: "Share Your Love" and "Delightful".

Hall currently lives in Las Vegas, where he has a production studio, and he performs locally, nationally, and internationally.

== Discography ==
=== Albums ===
Year	Album	Label	US R&B
1984	I Belong to You	MCA Records	30
1988	Love You Like a Stranger	MCA Records	—

=== Singles ===
Year	Song	US R&B
1984	"A Gentleman"	60
1984	"I've Been Watching You"	18
1988	"Slow Starter"	36
1988	"As Long as I Can Last"	—
2019	"DJ's Need Love Too / Callin' for Love"	—
2019	"How Do You Want Your Love"	—
2020	"A New Way of Love"	—
"—" denotes releases that did not chart.
