= Love Around the World =

Love Around the World may refer to:

- Love Around the World, a 1985 album by Leon Patillo
- "Love Around the World", a 2017 song by Snoop Dogg from Neva Left

== See also ==
- Live Around the World (disambiguation)
