= Foley (musician) =

American bassist and drummer

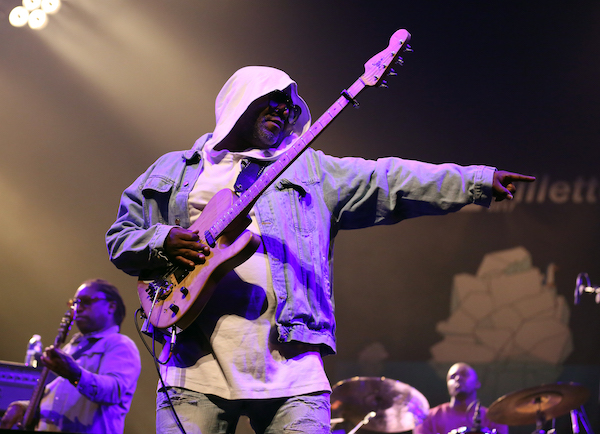
- Foley performing at Jazz à la Villette, France 2017

Background information
- Also known as: Foley
- Born: Joseph Lee McCreary, Jr. November 6, 1962 (age 63); Columbus, Ohio, U.S.
- Origin: Columbus, OH
- Genres: Jazz, jazz fusion, post-bop, Funk, Funk Rock
- Occupations: Musician, photographer
- Instruments: Leadbass, bass, drums, guitar, singing
- Years active: 1980s–present
- Labels: Motown, SmartAlecRECORDS
- Website: smartalecmusic.com

Foley (born Joseph Lee McCreary, Jr. 6 November 1962) is an American bassist, drummer and singer who is best known as the "lead bassist" with Miles Davis from 1987 until 1991.

== Music career ==
Foley was born in Columbus, Ohio. Growing up he listened to Sly and the Family Stone, and after his mother bought him a bass (at age 12) he started playing with local bands. In 1987, he had a phone conversation with Marcus Miller, then Miles Davis's bass player, and afterward sent him a tape of his music. Weeks later he got a call from Davis, who'd heard the tape and asked Foley to send him a copy: Miles Davis was looking for a guitarist, but at that time Foley had been working on getting his bass to sound like a guitar. By May 1987 Foley was touring with Davis, and played with him until the fall of 1991.

According to author George Cole, Davis gave Foley advice late in Foley's tenure with his band that changed the bassist's musical approach:

Ironically Miles died at the time when Foley was beginning to feel happy about his playing in Miles's band. "I didn't enjoy any performance with Miles for the most part until the last seven gigs before it was over – I started playing that gig," he says, "we were at Venice airport one night and he told me to play half of what I normally played. It really fucked me up the whole day and then I went on-stage and tried it and I began to realize that's what would make me phrase. That was the night I started to learn how to play."

In 1993 he played a lead bass solo on Mint Condition's R&B Top 40 hit "So Fine" and the interlude track "Gumbo" from their album From the Mint Factory.

In 1993, during his time at Motown, Foley released 7 Years Ago...Directions in Smart-Alec Music. The album included "If It's Positive".

The Cité de la Musique showed a Miles Davis exhibition from October 16, 2009, to January 17, 2010, that included Foley's "lead bass".

== Technique ==
Foley tuned his bass nearly an octave higher than a standard bass guitar using piccolo bass strings and processed it through various effects, allowing him to sound like a lead guitarist.

== Discography ==
=== As leader ===
- 7 Years Ago ... Directions in Smart-Alec Music (MoJazz, 1993)
- Smart Alec Music? (SmartAlecRECORDS 1997)
- Life without Dat Vol.1 (SmartAlecRECORDS, 2001)
- IN My Life (SmartAlecRECORDS, 2002)
- Tryin Mai Nerves (Single) (SmartAlecRECORDS, 2004)
- The Lost Sessions: LA (SmartAlecRECORDS, 2017)

=== As sideman ===
With George Clinton

- Hey, Man, Smell My Finger (Paisley Park, 1993) – rec. 1992–93
- George Clinton and His Gangsters of Love (Shanachie, 2008)

With Miles Davis

- Amandla (Warner Bros., 1989) – rec. 1988–89
- Miles in Paris (Warner Bros., 1990)
- Dingo (Warner Bros., 1991) – rec. 1990
- Black Devil (Beech Marten, 1992)
- Live – From His Last Concert in Avignon (LaserLight Digital, 1992)
- Miles in Montreux (Jazz Door, 1993)
- Live Around the World (Warner Bros., 1996) – rec. 1988–91
- Miles And His Group (Toshiba EMI, 1997)
- At La Villette (JVC, 2001)
- Live in Munich (Pioneer, 2002)
- The Complete Miles Davis at Montreux (Warner Music, 2002)
- Munich Concert (Deluxe, 2005)
- Time After Time. Live at the Philharmonic Concert Hall (Standing Oh!vation, 2005)[DVD-Video]
- The Very Best Of Miles Davis (Rhino Records, 2007)
- That's What Happened Live in Germany (Eagle Vision, 2009) – rec. 1987
- Miles! The Definitive Miles Davis at Montreux DVD Collection (Eagle Vision, 2011)
- 1986-1991 The Warner Years (Warner Music France, 2011)
- Merci Miles! Live at Vienne (Warner Bros., 2021) – rec. 1991

With Paolo Rustichelli

- Capri (Verve, 1991)
- Mystic Jazz (Polydor, 1992)

With Keith Staten

- Take Me Now (Self-Released, 1984)
- Don't Tell Me That (Self-Released, 1985)
- Break Your Body (Self-Released, 1985)

With Lenny White

- Renderors Of Spirit (Hip Bop, 1996)
- Edge (Hip Bop, 1998)
- Lenny White Live (BFM Jazz, 2013) – live rec. 1997

With others

- Arrested Development, Zingalamaduni (Chrysalis, 1994)
- Paul Brown's Science Gravy Orchestra, Science Gravy Classics (Self-Released, 2001)
- Dean Francis, Black As All That (Soulciety, 1998)
- Kenny Garrett, Prisoner of Love (Atlantic, 1989)
- Happy Chichester, Lovers Come Back (PopFly, 2007)
- Talib Kweli, Quality (Rawkus, 2002)
- Mint Condition, From the Mint Factory (Perspective, 1993)
- Parliament-Funkadelic, Chocolate City: London | P-Funk Live at Metropolis (Metropolis Recordings, 2015)
- Mavis Staples, Have A Little Faith (Alligator, 2004)
- Bobby Sparks II, Schizophrenia: The Yang Project (Leopard, 2019)
- Speech, Speech (Chrysalis, 1995)
- Tree Thirteen, Rough Grooves Surface (Out The Box, 2004)

=== As an engineer ===
With Vanessa Williams

- The Comfort Zone (Wing, 1991)
