= Decoy (album) =

Studio album by Miles Davis
- Released: June 1984
- Recorded: June 30, 1983 at A&R Studio, New York City; July 7, 1983 at Théâtre St. Denis, Montreal; and September 5, 10 and 11, 1983; and Record Plant, New York City.
- Genre: Jazz fusion
- Length: 39:12
- Label: Columbia
- Producer: Miles Davis

Miles Davis chronology
Star People (1983)	Decoy (1984)	You're Under Arrest (1985)

Professional ratings
Review scores
Source	Rating
AllMusic	2/5 stars
Tom Hull	B−
The Penguin Guide to Jazz Recordings	2.5/4 stars
The Rolling Stone Jazz Record Guide	4/5 stars
The Village Voice	B+

Decoy is a 1984 album by jazz musician Miles Davis, recorded in 1983. It was nominated for the Grammy Award for Best Jazz Fusion Performance. Keyboardist Robert Irving III and guitarist John Scofield wrote or co-wrote most of the new compositions. Saxophonist Branford Marsalis appears with the group on “Decoy”, “Code M.D.” and “That’s Right” playing soprano.

== Background ==
Decoy is the first album Davis recorded without the help of longtime producer Teo Macero. Macero still had plans, including recording Davis with the London Philharmonic Orchestra, but Davis insisted on producing the album himself. Herbie Hancock's "Rockit" was a hit, and Davis figured he could get airplay with his own new album as well, if he added more synthesizers, as well as beefed-up bass lines and overdubs, and so "we put clothes on the melodies", he said later. Gil Evans advised him as well, and suggested, on "That's Right", that Davis put chords behind the trumpet lines as a contrast. The idea of layering sounds was put to practice on "Code M.D.", where Davis plays a muted solo behind his own solo.

The main theme of "That's What Happened" was lifted directly from Scofield's improvised solo on "Speak", a live performance included on the previous album Star People. Full (live) versions of "That's What Happened" and "What It Is" were released in 2022 on That’s What Happened 1982-1985: The Bootleg Series, Vol. 7.

== Track listing ==
1. "Decoy" (Robert Irving III) - 8:33
2. "Robot 415" (Miles Davis, Robert Irving III) - 0:59
3. "Code M.D." (Robert Irving III) - 5:56
4. "Freaky Deaky" (Miles Davis) - 4:30
5. "What It Is" (Miles Davis, John Scofield) recorded live at the Festival International de Jazz, Montreal, 1983 - 4:32
6. "That's Right" (Miles Davis, John Scofield) - 11:11
7. "That's What Happened" (Miles Davis, John Scofield) recorded live at the Festival International de Jazz, Montreal, 1983 - 3:31

== Personnel ==
- Miles Davis – trumpet, synthesizers (2, 4–7), arrangements (2, 5–7)
- Robert Irving III – synthesizers (1–3, 6), electric drum programming and arrangements (1–3), synth bass (2)
- John Scofield – guitars (1, 3, 5–7)
- Darryl "The Munch" Jones – electric bass (1, 3–7)
- Al Foster – drums (1, 3–7)
- Mino Cinelu – percussion
- Branford Marsalis – soprano saxophone (1, 3, 6)
- Bill Evans – soprano saxophone (5, 7)
- Gil Evans – arrangements (6)

== Production ==
- George Butler – executive producer
- Miles Davis – producer
- Robert Irving III – co-producer
- Vincent Wilburn Jr. – associate co-producer
- Ron Lorman – engineer, remixing
- Tom Swift – assistant engineer, editing
- Guy Charbonneau – recording (5, 7)
- Mark "The King" Allison – technical assistant
- Bob Ludwig – mastering at Masterdisk (New York, NY)
- Genevieve Stewart – administrative assistant
- John Berg – package design
- Gilles Larrain – cover photography
- Blank & Blank – management
