= The Man with the Horn =

Studio album by Miles Davis
- Released: July 1981
- Recorded: June 1, 1980 – May 6, 1981
- Studio: Columbia 30th Street (New York City)
- Genre: Jazz-funk
- Length: 52:32
- Label: Columbia
- Producer: Teo Macero

Miles Davis chronology
Directions (1981)	The Man with the Horn (1981)	We Want Miles (1982)

Professional ratings
Review scores
Source	Rating
AllMusic	2.5/5 stars
The Penguin Guide to Jazz Recordings	3.5/4 stars
The Rolling Stone Jazz Record Guide	3/5 stars
Tom Hull – on the Web	B+

The Man with the Horn is an album released by Miles Davis in 1981. It was Davis's first new studio album since 1972's On the Corner, his first recordings of any kind since 1975 and his first activity following a six-year retirement. The album title references his 1952 10-inch LP Young Man with a Horn.

Largely pop influenced, the album fuses 1980s rock, pop and R&B with improvisational funk and fusion styles. The album marked Davis's return to more traditional acoustic trumpet playing after having utilized electronics in the mid-1970s, although the title song "The Man with the Horn" does feature a wah-wah pedal on Davis's improvisation (along with a lead vocal by keyboardist Randy Hall).

The title for "Fat Time" derived from a nickname given to guitarist Mike Stern during the recording sessions. Stern recalled that nickname was based on his time feel and his weight, elaborating that he was "heavier at the time". Davis approved of Stern's guitar solo on the song and thus decided to title the song "Fat Time" in honor of Stern.

== Track listing ==
All tracks composed by Miles Davis; except where indicated

1. "Fat Time" – 9:53
2. "Back Seat Betty" – 11:15
3. "Shout" (Glenn Burris, Randy Hall, Robert Irving III) – 5:52
4. "Aïda" – 8:10
5. "The Man with the Horn" (Hall, Irving) – 6:32
6. "Ursula" – 10:50

== Personnel ==
Musicians

- Miles Davis – trumpet, arrangements (1, 2, 4, 6), Wah pedal (5)
- Bill Evans – soprano saxophone (1, 2, 4, 5, 6)
- Robert Irving III – Yamaha CP-30 electronic piano (3, 5), acoustic piano (5), arrangements
- Randy Hall – Minimoog (3, 5), arrangements (3, 5), celeste (5), electric guitar (5), lead and backing vocals (5)
- Mike Stern – electric guitar (1)
- Barry Finnerty – electric guitar (2, 3, 4, 6)
- Marcus Miller – electric bass (1, 2, 4, 6)
- Felton Crews – electric bass (3, 5)
- Al Foster – drums (1, 2, 4, 6)
- Vince Wilburn Jr. – drums (3, 5)
- Sammy Figueroa – percussion (1–4, 6)

Production

- Teo Macero – producer
- George Butler – executive producer
- Don Puluse – engineer (1), remix engineer
- Stan Tonkel – engineer (2–6)
- Harold Tarowsky – technical adviser
- Ted Brosnan – second engineer
- Nancy Byers – second engineer
- Joe Gastwirt – mastering

Recorded, mixed and mastered at CBS Recording Studios (New York, NY)

- John Berg – design
- Cindy Brown – design
- Bob Cato – photography
