= Joshua C.S. =

Joshua Caleb Smith
- Birth name: Joshua Caleb Smith
- Also known as: Joshua C.S., Joshua, Joshua and the Bandits, Stereofox
- Born: Nashville, Tennessee, US
- Origin: Nashville, Tennessee, US
- Occupation(s): Singer-songwriter, composer, musician, performer, record producer, filmmaker
- Instrument(s): Vocals, guitar, bass guitar, synth, percussion
- Labels: True Source Entertainment (self)
- Website: listentojoshua.com

Joshua Caleb Smith, is an American songwriter, recording artist and musician. He was the vocalist on "Our Time Will Come", nominated for an Emmy Award in 2012 (Outstanding Original Score in a Drama Series). The song was showcased in 2011 on the show The Young and the Restless. In 2009, he founded the company True Source Entertainment.

== Professional life ==
Smith lived and worked in Los Angeles, California from 2005 to 2012. Currently he lives and works in Nashville as a recording artist, songwriter, and producer of music, video and other creative projects under True Source Entertainment, a "creative collective". In 2012 he opened an advertising and marketing agency called Plan Left with his brother Matthew Smith. He records and performs under the artist name, "Joshua" or "Joshua C.S." and when performing with a band, "Joshua and the Bandits" of which the line-up changes regularly.

His first record release under the band name, "Stereofox" was recorded in Los Angeles, by Gary Novak (drummer and recording professional) and produced by Deron Johnson (keyboardist, producer, multi-instrumentalist). His first independent EP under the name, "Listen | Joshua" has been released through Bandcamp in 2012 with True Source Entertainment and now iTunes in 2013 and was produced by Deron Johnson with the help of Andrea Remanda (under the name, "DANDA 1 Productions").

== Discography ==
=== Singles & EPs ===
- Joshua EP (2011) – promotional limited release
- Listen (2012) by Joshua – released on Bandcamp
  - Listen and Joshua were later released as a double EP
- Love and War EP.1 (TSE, 2014) by Joshua and the Bandits
- Milk and Honey Tapes Vol.1 (TSE, 2018) by Joshua C.S.
- Milk and Honey Tapes Vol.2 (TSE, 2018) by Joshua C.S.

=== Albums ===
- Ice the Symphony (Ecco Bravo Music Group, 2009) by Stereofox
- Roots (TSE, 2017)
- Live at Hendershot's in Athens GA (TSE, 2017)

=== Collaborations and other songs ===
- "Our Time Will Come" (TSE, 2012) by Joshua
- "Butter Song" (TSE, 2012) – limited release single for the 2011 film Butter by The Weinstein Company
- Pennhurst: Asylum of the Dead Soundtrack, Film score (TSE, 2012) – film directed by Michael Rooker
- "Cold As Ice" (Color Red, 2021) by Lamar Williams Jr. (written by Joshua C.S. and Lamar Williams Jr.)
