= The Best of Pino Daniele: Yes I Know My Way =

1998 compilation album by Pino Daniele

Compilation album by Pino Daniele
- Released: April 1998
- Genre: Pop rock; blues; jazz
- Length: 1:01:59
- Label: CGD East West
- Producer: Pino Daniele

Pino Daniele chronology
Dimmi cosa succede sulla Terra (1997)	The Best of Pino Daniele: Yes I Know My Way (1998)	Come un gelato all'equatore (1999)

Singles from The Best of Pino Daniele: Yes I Know My Way
- 1. "Senza peccato" Released: March 1998; 2. "Amore senza fine" Released: 1998

The Best of Pino Daniele: Yes I Know My Way is a compilation album by Italian musician Pino Daniele, released in 1998.

== Track listing ==
All tracks written by Pino Daniele, except where noted.

Side one
No.	Title	Length
1.	"Quando"	3:32
2.	"Io per lei"	3:34
3.	"Che male c'è"	4:07
4.	"Amore senza fine"	4:19
5.	"Senza peccato" (Pino Daniele, Jim Kerr)	5:02
6.	"Dubbi non ho"	4:14
7.	"Resta... Resta cu'mme"	2:49
8.	"Anna verrà"	4:57
Total length:		32:34

Side two
No.	Title	Length
1.	"Che soddisfazione"	3:13
2.	"Quanno chiove"	4:21
3.	"Napule è"	3:45
4.	"A testa in giù"	3:49
5.	"Je so' pazzo"	3:43
6.	"A me me piace 'o Blues"	3:08
7.	"Che Dio ti benedica"	4:17
8.	"Per te"	3:09
Total length:		29:25

== Charts ==
=== Weekly charts ===
Chart (1998)	Peak position
European Albums (European Top 100 Albums)	23
Italian Albums (Musica e dischi)	1
Swiss Albums (Schweizer Hitparade)	30

Chart (2015)	Peak position
Italian Albums (FIMI)	44
