= Freedom Jazz Dance: The Bootleg Series, Vol. 5 =

Box set by the Miles Davis Quintet
- Released: October 21, 2016
- Recorded: 1966–1968
- Studios: 30th Street Studio, New York City
- Genre: Jazz
- Length: 194:32
- Label: Columbia/Legacy
- Producer: Teo Macero

Miles Davis Bootleg Series chronology
Miles Davis at Newport 1955–1975: The Bootleg Series Vol. 4 (2015)	Freedom Jazz Dance: The Bootleg Series, Vol. 5 (2016)	The Final Tour: The Bootleg Series, Vol. 6 (2018)

Professional ratings
Aggregate scores
Source	Rating
Metacritic	76/100
Review scores
Source	Rating
All About Jazz (Collette)	5/5 stars
All About Jazz (Comandini)	4/5 stars
Cutting Edge	4/5 stars
Financial Times	4/5 stars
Rondo	4/5 stars

Freedom Jazz Dance: The Bootleg Series, Vol. 5 is a 3-CD box set by the Miles Davis Quintet compiling studio recordings by jazz trumpeter Miles Davis recorded between 1966 and 1968. The album contains remastered versions, alternate takes, and conversations among the musicians.

== Background ==
Davis recorded this music with what is sometimes called his second great quintet: saxophonist Wayne Shorter and rhythm section Herbie Hancock, Ron Carter and Tony Williams. Most of the music was recorded for the album Miles Smiles at the 30th Street Studio, a former church in New York City, in 1966.

== Track listing ==
All tracks are written by Wayne Shorter except where noted.

Disc one
No.	Title	Writer(s)	Length
1.	"Freedom Jazz Dance" (session reel)	Eddie Harris	23:13
2.	"Freedom Jazz Dance" (master take)	Harris	7:13
3.	"Circle" (session reel)	Miles Davis	11:44
4.	"Circle" (take 5 – closing theme used on master take)	Davis	5:23
5.	"Circle" (take 6 – released master take excluding closing theme)	Davis	5:48
6.	"Dolores" (session reel)		5:16
7.	"Dolores" (master take)		6:23

Disc two
No.	Title	Writer(s)	Length
1.	"Orbits" (session reel)		14:43
2.	"Orbits" (master take)		4:41
3.	"Footprints" (session reel)		5:47
4.	"Footprints" (master take)		9:51
5.	"Gingerbread Boy" (session reel)	Jimmy Heath	3:43
6.	"Gingerbread Boy" (master take)	Heath	7:44
7.	"Nefertiti" (session reel)		11:05
8.	"Nefertiti" (master take)		8:04

Disc three
No.	Title	Writer(s)	Length
1.	"Fall" (session reel)		19:44
2.	"Fall" (master take)		6:41
3.	"Water Babies" (session reel)		8:32
4.	"Water Babies" (master take)		5:09
5.	"Masqualero" (alternate take/take 3)		7:59
6.	"Country Son" (rhythm section rehearsal)	Davis	7:43
7.	"Blues in F (My Ding)"	Davis	7:29
8.	"Play Your Eight (Miles Speaks)"	Davis	0:05

== Personnel ==
=== The Miles Davis Quintet ===
- Miles Davis – trumpet
- Wayne Shorter – tenor saxophone
- Herbie Hancock – piano
- Ron Carter – bass
- Tony Williams – drums
