= Suddenly (Marcus Miller album) =

Studio album by Marcus Miller
- Released: March 23, 1983
- Recorded: August–December 1982
- Studio: Minot Sound (White Plains, New York); Celebration Recording Studios, Soundworks Digital Audio/Video Studios and Studio 54 (New York City, New York)
- Genre: Jazz fusion, jazz-funk
- Length: 43:23
- Label: Warner Bros.
- Producer: Marcus Miller; Michael Colina; Ray Bardani

Marcus Miller chronology
| Suddenly (1983) | Marcus Miller (1984) |

Professional ratings
Review scores
| Source | Rating |
|---|---|
| AllMusic | 2/5 stars |

Suddenly is the debut studio album by American jazz bass-guitarist Marcus Miller, released in 1983.

The album was re-released in 1999.

== Track listing ==
All tracks composed by Marcus Miller except where noted.

1. "Lovin' You" - 5:19
2. "Much Too Much" - 6:12
3. "Suddenly" (Miller, Mainor Ramsay) - 5:25
4. "Just For You" - 3:53
5. "The Only Reason I Live" - 5:01
6. "Just What I Needed" - 4:51
7. "Let Me Show You (I Just Want To Make You Smile)" - 4:41
8. "Be My Love" (Miller, Luther Vandross) - 4:25
9. "Could It Be You" (instrumental) - 3:24

== Personnel ==
=== Musicians ===
- Marcus Miller – lead vocals, backing vocals, all instruments
- Ralph MacDonald – percussion (2–4, 6, 9)
- Yvonne Lewis – backing vocals (2, 4), additional backing vocals (3)
- Luther Vandross – additional backing vocals (1), backing vocals (4)
- David Sanborn – alto saxophone (3–4)
- Buddy Williams – drums (4, 9)
- Mike Mainieri – vibraphone (2)
- Tawatha Agee – backing vocals (4)
- Brenda White King – backing vocals (4)
- Yogi Horton – drums (5)
- Harvey Mason – drums (6)
- Nick Moroch – acoustic guitar (9)

Strings (tracks 4 & 9)

- Michael Colina – string arrangements
- Dean Crandall and Lewis Paer – 2-string bass
- Eric Bartlett – cello
- Maureen Gallagher and Valerie Haywood – viola
- Kineko Barbini, Martha Caplin-Silverman, Robert Chausow, Guillermo Figueroa, Joanna Jenner, Anca Nicolau, Carol Pool, Eriko Sato, Naoko Tanaka and Ruth Waterman – violin

=== Production ===
- Michael Colina – producer
- Marcus Miller – producer
- Ray Bardani – producer, recording, mixing
- Phil Burnett – assistant engineer
- Daniel Christopher – assistant engineer
- Michael Morongell – assistant engineer
- Eddie Osario – assistant engineer
- Steven Remote – assistant engineer
- Wayne Yurgelin – assistant engineer
- Bruce Robbins – technical maintenance
- George Marino – mastering at Sterling Sound (New York, NY)
- Katherine Jewel – contractor
- Christine Sauers – art direction
- George Holz – photography
