= Music from Siesta =

Soundtrack album by Miles Davis and Marcus Miller
- Released: November 1987
- Recorded: January–February 1987
- Studios: Sigma Sound, New York City; Amigo, North Hollywood, California
- Genres: Classical, jazz
- Length: 37:54
- Label: Warner Bros./WEA
- Producer: Marcus Miller

Miles Davis chronology
Tutu (1986)	Music from Siesta (1987)	Amandla (1989)

Marcus Miller chronology
Marcus Miller (1984)	Music from Siesta (1987)	The Sun Don't Lie (1993)

Professional ratings
Review scores
Source	Rating
Allmusic	3/5 stars

Music from Siesta is an album released in 1987 by Miles Davis and Marcus Miller. It is the soundtrack of the 1987 film Siesta, directed by Mary Lambert. Miles was nominated for a GRAMMY Award, for Best Solo Jazz Instrumental Performance, at the 31st Annual GRAMMY Awards.

== Track listing ==
All songs composed by Marcus Miller, except "Theme for Augustine" by Miles Davis & Marcus Miller

1. "Lost in Madrid, Part 1" - 1:48
2. "Siesta / Kitt's Kiss / Lost in Madrid, Part 2" - 6:54
3. "Theme for Augustine / Wind / Seduction / Kiss" - 6:33
4. "Submission" - 2:32
5. "Lost in Madrid, Part 3" - 0:49
6. "Conchita / Lament" - 6:43
7. "Lost in Madrid, Part 4 / Rat Dance / The Call" - 1:41
8. "Claire / Lost in Madrid, Part 5" - 4:33
9. "Afterglow" - 1:41
10. "Los Feliz" - 4:35

== Performers ==
- Miles Davis - trumpet
- Marcus Miller - bass, bass clarinet, keyboards, drum machine, etc.
- John Scofield - acoustic guitar on "Siesta"
- Omar Hakim - drums on "Siesta"
- Earl Klugh - classical guitar on "Claire"
- James Walker - flute on "Los Feliz"
- Jason Miles - synthesizer programming

== Charts ==
Chart performance
Chart (2026)	Peak position
Hungarian Physical Albums (MAHASZ)	23
