= Marcus Miller (album) =

Studio album by Marcus Miller
- Released: June 26, 1984, re-released 1999
- Recorded: October 1983 – March 1984
- Studio: Mediasound, New York City; Minot Sound, White Plains; Warner Bros., North Hollywood
- Genre: Jazz-rock, jazz
- Length: 47:38
- Label: Warner Bros.
- Producer: Marcus Miller; Ray Bardani

Marcus Miller chronology
Suddenly (1983)	Marcus Miller (1984)	Music from Siesta (1987)

Professional ratings
Review scores
Source	Rating
AllMusic	3/5 stars

Marcus Miller is a Marcus Miller album released in the summer of 1984.

== Reception ==
Allmusic awarded the album 3 stars and its review by Ed Hogan states: "Marcus Miller followed his debut LP, Suddenly, with this self-titled PRA/Warner Bros. album released during summer 1984. His fusion of funk/R&B/jazz is well-balanced on this effort and better represents his formidable talents as a bassist/songwriter/producer/vocalist/multi-instrumentalist."

== Track listing ==
All tracks composed by Marcus Miller

1. "Unforgettable" - 5:45
2. "Is There Anything I Can Do" - 5:24
3. "Superspy" - 5:59
4. "Juice" - 6:40
5. "I Could Give You More" - 6:00
6. "Perfect Guy" - 5:52
7. "My Best Friend's Girlfriend" - 7:27
8. "Nadine" - 4:31

== Personnel ==
=== Musicians ===
- Marcus Miller – lead vocals, backing vocals, all instruments
- Errol "Crusher" Bennett – additional percussion
- Anthony MacDonald – additional percussion
- David Sanborn – alto saxophone (4, 6)
- Tawatha Agee – backing vocals
- Robin Clark – backing vocals
- Renee Diggs – backing vocals
- Diva Gray – backing vocals
- Yvonne Lewis – backing vocals
- Fonzi Thornton – backing vocals

=== Production ===
- Marcus Miller – producer
- Ray Bardani – producer, engineer, mixing
- Paul Brown – assistant engineer
- Rudy Hill – assistant engineer
- Steve Rinkoff – assistant engineer
- Bruce Robbins – assistant engineer, technical maintenance
- Wayne Warnecke – assistant engineer
- George Marino – mastering at Sterling Sound (New York, NY)
- Kate Jansen – production administrator
- Dana Lester – production administrator
- Shirley Klein – album coordinator
- Simon Levy – art direction, design
- Brian Hagiwara – photography
- Patrick Rains – management
