= Sal Giorgianni =

American saxophone player

Sal Giorgianni is an American saxophone player.

He was born in Upstate New York. Giorgianni was a member of the Ellenville High School Jazz Ensemble which, among other things, performed at the 1982 Montreux Jazz Festivalwith jazz director Brian Shaw. He returned again to Montreux to appear on the cd Miles & Quincy Live at Montreux. Sal was one of the saxophone players of Big Bop Nouveau with Maynard Ferguson on the cd Brass Attitude. Giorganni has released three albums as a solo artist on Windhouse Records: "Sango", "Blue 'N' Boogie", and "Angel Eyes".
