= Common Ground (Richie Havens album) =

Studio album by Richie Havens
- Released: 1983
- Studio: Stone Castle Studios, Carimate, Como, Italy
- Label: EMI Italiana/Bagaria
- Producer: Pino Daniele

Richie Havens chronology
Connections (1980)	Common Ground (1983)	Simple Things (1987)

Common Ground is a 1983 album by American folk rock musician Richie Havens. The album was recorded at Stone Castle Studios in Carimate (Como) Italy.

== Track listing ==
All tracks composed by Pino Daniele and Richie Havens; except where indicated

1. "Death at an Early Age" (Greg Chansky)
2. "Gay Cavalier" (Pino Daniele, Richie Havens, William Rafael)
3. "Lay Ye Down Boys" (Ken Lauber, Merritt Melloy)
4. "This Is the Hour"
5. "Stand Up" (Pino Daniele, Kelvin Bullen)
6. "Dear John" (Maury Yeston)
7. "Leave Well Enough Alone"
8. "Moonlight Rain"
9. "Things Must Change"

== Personnel ==
- Richie Havens — lead vocals, arrangements
- Pino Daniele — electric and acoustic guitars, keyboard arrangements, backing vocals on "Gay Cavalier" and "Things Must Change"
- Allan Goldberg — arrangements
- Joe Amoruso — keyboards
- Jennifer Lessing — backing vocals
- Linda Wesley — backing vocals
- Jeremy Meek — bass
- Tullio De Piscopo — drums
- Enzo Avitabile — flute
- Kelvin Bullen — rhythm electric and acoustic guitars
- Aldo Banfi — synclavier
- Danny Cummings — percussion
- Mel Collins — saxophone
- Arnold David Clapman — cover artwork

== Releases ==
The album was released on vinyl and tape.
