= Miles! Miles! Miles! =

Live album by Miles Davis
- Released: November 1, 1992
- Recorded: October 4, 1981
- Venue: special stage in Nishi-Shinjuku, Tokyo
- Genre: Jazz fusion
- Length: 1:14:51
- Label: Sony Music Japan

Miles Davis chronology
Doo-Bop (1992)	Miles! Miles! Miles! (1992)	Miles & Quincy Live at Montreux (1993)

Miles Davis live chronology
We Want Miles (1981)	Miles! Miles! Miles! (1981)	Live Around the World (1988)

Professional ratings
Review scores
Source	Rating
AllMusic	3/5 stars

Miles! Miles! Miles!: Live in Japan '81 is an album by Miles Davis, released exclusively in Japan in 1992. It contains recordings from the October 4, 1981 concert in Tokyo, some of which had appeared on We Want Miles, including the original version of the track "Jean-Pierre", elsewhere edited by producer Teo Macero to remove the first twenty-five seconds of introduction, consisting primarily of a guitar riff and percussion.

== Track listing ==
Sony Music Japan – SRCS 6513-4

Disc one
No.	Title	Writer(s)	Length
1.	"Back Seat Betty"	Miles Davis	20:18
2.	"Ursula"	Miles Davis	2:00
3.	"My Man's Gone Now"	DuBose Heyward, George Gershwin	15:44
4.	"Aïda"	Miles Davis	12:17

Disc two
No.	Title	Writer(s)	Length
1.	"Fat Time"	Miles Davis	12:59
2.	"Jean-Pierre"	Miles Davis	11:33
Total length:			1:14:51

== Personnel ==
Musicians

- Miles Davis – trumpet, Keyboard
- Bill Evans – soprano saxophone
- Mike Stern – electric guitar
- Marcus Miller – electric bass
- Al Foster – drums
- Mino Cinelu – percussion

Production

- Motoaki Uehara – coordinator
- Tomoo Suzuki – engineer (mixing)
- Kazumi Sugiura – engineer (mastering)
- Hideki Sawa – art direction
- Katuji Abe – photography
- Shigeru Uchiyama – photography
