= Live Around the World =

Live Around the World may refer to:

- Live Around the World (Meat Loaf album), 1996
- Live Around the World (Miles Davis album), 1996
- Live Around the World (Queen + Adam Lambert album), 2020
