= We Want Miles =

Live album by Miles Davis
- Released: May 1982
- Recorded: June 27, July 5 & October 4, 1981
- Venue: KIX in Boston, Avery Fisher Hall in NYC and special stage in Nishi-Shinjuku
- Genre: Jazz fusion, jazz funk
- Length: 76:45
- Label: CBS
- Producer: Teo Macero

Miles Davis chronology
The Man with the Horn (1981)	We Want Miles (1982)	Star People (1983)

Miles Davis live chronology
Pangaea (1975)	We Want Miles (1981)	Miles! Miles! Miles! (1981)

Professional ratings
Review scores
Source	Rating
AllMusic	4/5 stars
The Penguin Guide to Jazz Recordings	3/4 stars
Rolling Stone	2/5 stars
The Rolling Stone Jazz Record Guide	4/5 stars

We Want Miles is a double album recorded by jazz trumpeter Miles Davis in 1981, produced by Teo Macero and released by Columbia Records in 1982. The album combines recordings from the first live appearances by Davis in more than five years, at Boston's Kix Club, on June 27, 1981. Other tracks were recorded at Avery Fisher Hall, New York City, on July 5, and a specially prepared stage at Nishi-Shinjuku in Tokyo, Japan, October 4 of that year.

== Background ==
Miles Davis had returned to the studio in 1980, after a long hiatus during which he left the trumpet alone and focused on women and cocaine, according to his autobiography. Changing some personnel while recording The Man with the Horn, he formed a live band consisting of Mike Stern on guitar (replacing Barry Finnerty), Al Foster on drums, Mino Cinelu on percussion (he had replaced Sammy Figueroa), Bill Evans on soprano, and Marcus Miller on bass. By this time it had been six years since he played live.

Davis secured a two-performance gig on July 2, 1981, at the Kool Jazz Festival (the name given to the old Newport Jazz Festival while it was held in New York City, at Avery Fisher Hall), but first played four shows at Kix, a club in Boston. Recordings from these shows, with a recording from an October date in Japan, were used to compile We Want Miles. It was for the shows at Kix, 26–29 June, that he hired Cinelu, whom he saw play percussion at a New York City club (Cinelu having just fortuitously switched from drums—Davis was looking for a percussionist, not a drummer). After the show Davis put his hand on Cinelu's arm and said, "You're a motherfucker". Cinelu didn't recognize Davis, who was in poor health, but when he was told who it was, returned to Davis who asked for his number. Soon after Davis called him, saying "come to the studio, you motherfucker". He attended an impromptu jam session at Davis's apartment with Mike Stern, playing with a cymbal and some drums, and was hired.

Rehearsals were mostly jam sessions, though technical preparations were meticulous and included the development of a wireless system for Davis's trumpet. The younger band members were somewhat disconcerted by the looseness of the rehearsals (Stern especially was worried), but this organization, with no music written down beyond basic song structures, was exactly what Davis wanted.

== Performances ==
The sets at Kix were built on four tunes, with the band usually playing a medley of three of them each set. "Kix" was a new tune named for the Boston club, "Back-Seat Betty" and "Aïda" came from The Man with the Horn, and "My Man's Gone Now" was an adaptation of the Gershwin song that Davis had recorded in 1958 for the Gil Evans-orchestrated Porgy and Bess album. Longtime Davis producer Teo Macero supervised the Kix recordings; at the time Davis was still in poor health, and Macero commented that he was still regaining control of himself and the band. Davis's record company, Columbia Records, was unsure how long his comeback would last and sent out their mobile recording unit to capture every moment. Video was shot also but as of 2007 had not yet been released.

The shows at Avery Fisher Hall were advertised as Davis's real comeback, and the sold-out concerts were attended by many artists and celebrities. Recordings were done with a mobile unit from Record Plant Studios in New York. At the first show, the announcer incorrectly mentioned there was a delay; when the band started half the audience was still in the foyer. The show lasted a little over an hour, and there was no encore; the second show was longer because Davis added "My Man's Gone Now". Reviews were mixed, with Stern's long hair and Stratocaster being derided by some of the jazz connoisseurs: Robert Palmer criticized Stern's guitar work as full of rock cliches. Stern himself commented that Avery Fisher Hall was not the right venue for electric music. He was close to tears after one review, and Davis comforted him, according to George Cole. Jack Chambers, in Milestones, commented that the Avery Fisher shows were "frenetic" given the "pressure-packed" venue and that the band was much more relaxed at Kix, though at Kix they were "much less comfortable with Davis and with one another" than they would be a few months later, and he deems the Japan shows superior.

After Avery Fisher, Davis was booked at the Savoy on 44th street and then went on to tour the US, from July to late September. The physical exertion of playing was taking its toll; by the end of the tour he had to be given oxygen after the shows and was physically and mentally coached even during the concerts. To get the support he needed to play, he wore a rubber corset. Still he planned a tour of Japan, which was the last country he played before his 1975 retirement, apart from a tour of the Midwest with Herbie Hancock and several East Coast dates that summer. On October 2, 3, and 4 he played at an outdoor venue in Shinjuku, Tokyo, under trying circumstances: the entire PA system blew out on the first night, during the show, and had to be rebuilt speaker by speaker. The October 4 show was released on the Japan-only Miles! Miles! Miles!. Further shows were played at Nagoya, Osaka, Fukuoka, and when the band returned to the USA they performed "Jean-Pierre" on Saturday Night Live, in a disappointing performance: Davis had caught pneumonia and there was no time to recuperate. The song was played too fast, Davis was in constant pain, and the performance and the taping were awkward.

== Content ==
The double album contains six tracks. Two versions of "Jean-Pierre", a long and a short one, are the bookends on the first record for two songs from The Man With the Horn, "Back-Seat Betty" and "Aïda" (here called "Fast Track"). Two long tracks fill up the second record: the "long vamp" "Kix", and "My Man's Gone Now".

The long version of "Jean-Pierre" features a long guitar solo by Stern (which Philip Freeman calls one of the best moments on the album); the shorter one is an edited version, possibly for radio play. "Back-Seat Betty", a "powerfully urgent, rocky outing", was the opening song of the very first concert in Avery Fisher Hall (edited down to half the original length), and the only song from those shows to make it to the album. Solos by Stern and Evans were edited out.

== Release information ==
First released on CD in Japan as a two-disc set (CBS/Sony CSCS 5131/5132), subsequent CD releases fit the music onto one disc. Columbia Records have never released it on CD in North America (a 2 disc version was released in America as part of the CD box set “The Perfect Miles Davis Collection”). The shows in Japan were released in Japan only, as Miles! Miles! Miles!.

== Awards and influence ==
This album won the 1982 Grammy Award for Best Jazz Instrumental Performance by a Soloist, though Davis said in an interview he did not know why. In regard to the Grammy he told journalist David Breskin that he didn't record for any other reason than money, though biographer Ian Carr says the comment "belied the fact that the award had pleased him mightily".

One of the attendees of the 1981 tour that followed the Avery Fisher shows was Don Cheadle, director of the 2015 biopic Miles Ahead.

== Track listing ==
All tracks composed by Miles Davis except where indicated

Side One

1. "Jean-Pierre" – 10:30
2. "Back Seat Betty" – 8:10

Side Two

3. "Fast Track" – 15:10
4. "Jean-Pierre" – 4:00

Side Three

5. "My Man's Gone Now" (DuBose Heyward, George Gershwin) – 20:12

Side Four

6. "Kix" – 18:45

== Personnel ==
Musicians

- Miles Davis – trumpet, keyboards
- Bill Evans – soprano saxophone, tenor saxophone
- Mike Stern – electric guitar
- Marcus Miller – bass guitar
- Al Foster – drums
- Mino Cinelu – percussion

Production

- Teo Macero – producer
- Henri Renaud – series producer
- George Butler – executive producer
- Bud Grahm – engineer (control)
- Don Puluse – engineer (control)
- Hank Altman – engineer (recording)
- Ted Brosnan – engineer (recording)
- David Hewitt – engineer (recording)
- Don Puluse – engineer (remix)
- Ted Brosnan – engineer (remix)
- Yasuhisa Yoneda – photography (cover)
- Bruce Talamon – photography (Inside)
