= The Final Tour: The Bootleg Series, Vol. 6 =

Box set / live album by Miles Davis & John Coltrane
- Released: March 23, 2018
- Recorded: March 21, 22 & 24, 1960
- Venues: L'Olympia, Paris; Konserthuset, Stockholm; Tivolis Koncertsal, Copenhagen
- Genre: Jazz
- Length: 220:00
- Label: Columbia/Legacy
- Producers: Steve Berkowitz, Michael Cuscuna, Richard Seidel

Miles Davis Bootleg Series chronology
The Bootleg Series, Vol. 5: Freedom Jazz Dance (2016)	The Final Tour: The Bootleg Series, Vol. 6 (2018)	The Bootleg Series, Vol. 7: That's What Happened 1982–1985 (2022)

The Final Tour: The Bootleg Series, Vol. 6 is a four-CD live box set credited to Miles Davis and John Coltrane compiling five sets from three performances by the Miles Davis Quintet in Europe during late March 1960. The anthology was released by Columbia/Legacy in 2018 and topped the Billboard Jazz Albums chart.

Professional ratings
Aggregate scores
Source	Rating
Metacritic	87/100
Review scores
Source	Rating
All About Jazz	5/5 stars
AllMusic	4.5/5 stars
Pitchfork	8.3/10
PopMatters	8/10
Record Collector	4/5 stars

== Background ==
The concerts derive from a three-week European tour undertaken by the Davis band as part of a Jazz at the Philharmonic presentation as organized by promoter Norman Granz, which also included Stan Getz and Oscar Peterson as headliners.

== Track listing ==
All tracks are written by Miles Davis, except as noted.

Disc one
No.	Title	Writer(s)	Recording details	Length
1.	"All of You"	Cole Porter	L'Olympia, Paris first set	17:05
2.	"So What"		L'Olympia, Paris first set	13:06
3.	"On Green Dolphin Street"	Ned Washington; Bronislaw Kaper	L'Olympia, Paris first set	14:59
4.	"Walkin'"	Richard Carpenter	L'Olympia, Paris second set	15:52

Disc two
No.	Title	Writer(s)	Recording details	Length
1.	"Bye Bye Blackbird"	Mort Dixon; Ray Henderson	L'Olympia, Paris second set	14:01
2.	"'Round Midnight"	Thelonious Monk	L'Olympia, Paris second set	5:37
3.	"Oleo"	Sonny Rollins	L'Olympia, Paris second set	4:22
4.	"The Theme"		L'Olympia, Paris second set	0:50
5.	"Introduction by Norman Granz"		Tivolis Koncertsal, Copenhagen	0:59
6.	"So What"		Tivolis Koncertsal, Copenhagen	14:37
7.	"On Green Dolphin Street"	Washington; Kaper	Tivolis Koncertsal, Copenhagen	14:35
8.	"All Blues"		Tivolis Koncertsal, Copenhagen	15:31
9.	"The Theme" (incomplete)		Tivolis Koncertsal, Copenhagen	0:31

Disc three
No.	Title	Writer(s)	Recording details	Length
1.	"Introduction by Norman Granz"		Konserthuset, Stockholm first set	1:11
2.	"So What"		Konserthuset, Stockholm first set	10:35
3.	"Fran-Dance"		Konserthuset, Stockholm first set	7:25
4.	"Walkin'"	Carpenter	Konserthuset, Stockholm first set	16:21
5.	"The Theme"		Konserthuset, Stockholm first set	0:53

Disc four
No.	Title	Writer(s)	Recording details	Length
1.	"So What"		Konserthuset, Stockholm second set	15:20
2.	"On Green Dolphin Street"	Washington; Kaper	Konserthuset, Stockholm second set	13:40
3.	"All Blues"		Konserthuset, Stockholm second set	16:10
4.	"The Theme"		Konserthuset, Stockholm second set	0:59
5.	"John Coltrane interview"			6:13

== Personnel ==
- Miles Davis – trumpet
- John Coltrane – tenor saxophone
- Wynton Kelly – piano
- Paul Chambers – double bass
- Jimmy Cobb – drums
