= Star People =

Studio album with live recordings by Miles Davis
- Released: April 1983
- Recorded: August 11, 1982 – February 3, 1983
- Genre: Jazz fusion
- Length: 58:35
- Label: Columbia
- Producer: Teo Macero

Miles Davis chronology
We Want Miles (1982)	Star People (1983)	Decoy (1984)

Star People is a 1983 album recorded by Miles Davis and issued by Columbia Records. It is the second studio recording released after the trumpeter's six-year hiatus, the first to feature electric guitarist John Scofield, who was recommended by saxophonist Bill Evans, and the last to be produced by long-standing collaborator Teo Macero.

Bassist Marcus Miller, who would go on to produce future Davis sessions, plays on five of the tracks. Electric guitarist Mike Stern features on most of the pieces, and drummer Al Foster and percussionist Mino Cinelu round out the rhythm section. Davis played trumpet and Oberheim synthesizer simultaneously (without using overdubs), and also on separately recorded interludes for the over-18-minute-long blues "Star People". The album was re-released as a part of the boxed set Miles Davis: The Complete Columbia Album Collection in 2009, and was further remastered and reissued in 2022.

== Reception ==
Professional ratings
Review scores
Source	Rating
AllMusic	4/5 stars
Christgau's Record Guide	A−
The Penguin Guide to Jazz Recordings	3/4 stars
The Rolling Stone Jazz Record Guide	4/5 stars
Tom Hull – on the Web	B+

In a contemporaneous review, music writer Greg Tate wrote:

Now, what I've come to love about Star People is that it doesn't sound like Miles wants this band to become capable of anything but playing a simple blues. And while seeing Miles in concert recently made me think he was trying to reconstruct his mystique out of thin air, Star People reveals him capable of delightful self-parody. Like Picasso when he ran out of ideas, Miles has taken to enjoying poking a little fun at himself. So that on Star People we hear the innovator of modern music make a big to-do out of playing muted blues cliches over funk vamps that were old in 1970, hear him riotously romp through a cornball Tin Pan Alley variation like he was born yesterday, find him spurting soul band trumpet squeals in and out of a number whose head and rhythm arrangement come across like a cross between Basie, Bird, and James Brown. Moreover, we find Miles enjoying working with musicians not on the cutting edge, but on the backburner of bebop conservatism. [...] On the other hand, I'm not going to say the record doesn't swing when it wants to, and all in all it just may be the most accessible LP Miles has ever made. [...] Furthermore, when you stop and consider the source of this oldhat comedy routine, it kinda leaves you in stitches. (When genius mocks itself, what other response is there?)

The album was nominated for the Grammy Award for Best Jazz Fusion Performance.

== Track listing ==
All tracks are written by Miles Davis.

Side one
No.	Title	Recording date and studio/venue	Length
1.	"Come Get It"	August 28, 1982 live at Jones Beach Theatre, New York	11:22
2.	"It Gets Better"	January 5, 1983 at Record Plant Studio, New York	9:47
3.	"Speak"	February 3, 1983 live at Cullen Auditorium, University of Houston, Houston	8:24

Side two
No.	Title	Recording date and studio/venue	Length
1.	"Star People"	September 1, 1982 at Columbia Studio B, New York	18:44
2.	"U'n'I"	September 1, 1982 at Columbia Studio B, New York	5:55
3.	"Star on Cicely"	August 11, 1982 at Columbia Studio B, New York	4:23

== Personnel ==
- Miles Davis – trumpet, keyboards
- Mike Stern – electric guitar
- John Scofield – electric guitar (2, 3)
- Marcus Miller – electric bass (1, 2, 4, 5, 6)
- Tom Barney – electric bass (3)
- Al Foster – drums
- Mino Cinelu – percussion
- Bill Evans – soprano saxophone, tenor saxophone
- Gil Evans – arrangements (uncredited)

=== Production ===
- Dr George Butler – executive producer
- Teo Macero – producer
- Don Puluse – recording and remix engineer at CBS Studios (New York City)
- Jay Messina – recording engineer at Record Plant (New York City)
- Ron Lorman – remote sound engineer
- Bill Messina, Ken Robertson, Lou Schlossberg and Harold Tarowski – engineers
- Mark Allison, Chris Murphy and Jim Rose – technician assistants
- Joe Gastwirt – mastering at Frankford/Wayne Mastering Labs (New York City)
- Miles Davis – "all drawings, color concepts and basic attitudes"
- Janet Perr – cover design
- John Berg – art direction
- Leonard Feather – liner notes
