= Doo-Bop =

Studio album by Miles Davis
- Released: June 30, 1992
- Recorded: January 19 – February 1991
- Studios: Unique Recording Studios, New York City
- Genres: Acid jazz, jazz rap
- Length: 40:02
- Label: Warner Bros.
- Producer: Easy Mo Bee

Miles Davis chronology
Dingo (1991)	Doo-Bop (1992)	Miles! Miles! Miles! (1992)

Doo-Bop is a studio album by American jazz trumpeter Miles Davis. It was recorded with hip hop producer Easy Mo Bee and released posthumously on June 30, 1992, by Warner Bros. Records. The album was received unfavorably by most critics, although it won a Grammy Award for Best R&B Instrumental Performance the following year, and the track Fantasy received a nomination for the Grammy Award for Best Jazz Performance.

== Background ==
The project stemmed from Davis sitting in his New York City apartment in the summer with the windows open, listening to the sound of the streets. He wanted to record an album of music that captured these sounds. In early 1991, Davis called up his friend Russell Simmons and asked him to find some young producers who could help create this kind of music, leading to Davis's collaboration with Easy Mo Bee.

At the time of Davis's death in 1991, only six pieces for the album had been completed. Easy Mo Bee was asked by Warner Bros. to take some of the unreleased trumpet performances (stemming from the unreleased 1985 album Rubberband, which was later released as an album in 2019), and build tracks that Davis "would have loved" around the recordings. The album's posthumous tracks (as stated in the liner notes) are "High Speed Chase" and "Fantasy". A reprise of the song "Mystery" rounded out the album's nine-track length.

== Release and reception ==
Professional ratings
Review scores
Source	Rating
AllMusic	2/5 stars
DownBeat	4.5/5 stars
The Encyclopedia of Popular Music	3/5 stars
Entertainment Weekly	B−
Los Angeles Times	2.5/4 stars
The Penguin Guide to Jazz Recordings	3/4 stars
Q	4/5 stars
(The New) Rolling Stone Album Guide	2/5 stars

The title is a play on words on the two musical genres doo-wop and bebop. Doo-Bop was released by Warner Bros. Records on June 30, 1992. By May 1993, it had sold approximately 300,000 copies worldwide. The album received negative reviews from most critics. Greg Tate called it an "inconsequential" jazz-rap record from Davis, while Billboard found the R&B-based album to not "quite cut as deeply" as his 1970s funk recordings. In Entertainment Weekly, Greg Sandow wrote that Davis's solos were performed with "impeccable logic and wistful finesse" but accompanied by hackneyed guest raps and unadventurous hip hop beats, which reduced Doo-Bop to "elegant aural wallpaper". Los Angeles Times critic Don Snowden believed the album "succeeded only in fits and starts" because of Davis's first time working with hip hop tracks, "the rigidity" of which Snowden felt often reduced his "muted-laced-with-echo trumpet to just another instrumental color in the mix". Richard Williams from The Independent viewed the tracks as a regression from the ambient-inflected Tutu (1986) album as they inspired trumpet improvisations from Davis which displayed "a rhythmic banality that was never remotely discernible in Miles's pre-electric playing".

In a positive review, Q called Doo-Bop "a collector's piece ... as hip, sexy, open and complex as the best of his work since he elected to turn to FM airplay music in the 1980s". Musician considered it a pleasant hip hop album and an accessible introduction to Davis's music for "younger ears weaned on modern beats". In DownBeat, Robin Tolleson wrote that Davis sounded less timid than on previous few records as "his phrasing and concept adapt sharply from tune to tune". Doo-Bop won the 1993 Grammy Award for Best R&B Instrumental Performance.

== Track listing ==
- All tracks written by Miles Davis/Easy Mo Bee, except where indicated:

Side One
No.	Title	Writer(s)	Length
1.	"Mystery"		3:56
2.	"The Doo-Bop Song"		5:02
3.	"Chocolate Chip"	Davis, Easy Mo Bee, Donald Hepburn	4:41
4.	"High Speed Chase"	Davis, Easy Mo Bee, Larry Mizell	4:40

Side Two
No.	Title	Length
5.	"Blow"	5:07
6.	"Sonya"	5:32
7.	"Fantasy"	4:38
8.	"Duke Booty"	4:56
9.	"Mystery (Reprise)"	1:26

== Personnel ==
Credits are adapted from The Last Miles (2007) by George Cole.
Musicians

- Miles Davis – trumpet
- Deron Johnson – keyboards
- J.R – performer
- A.B. Money – performer

Production

- Easy Mo Bee – producer
- Matt Pierson – associate producer
- Gordon Meltzer – associate executive producer
- Daniel Beroff – engineer
- Reginald Dozier – engineer
- Zane Giles – engineer
- Randy Hall – engineer
- John McGlain – engineer
- Bruce Moore – engineer
- Arthur Steuer – engineer
- Kirk Yano – engineer
- D'Anthony Johnson – engineer, mixing
- Eric Lynch – engineer, mixing
- Ted Jensen – mastering
- Rodney Lucas – technical Services
- Faith Newman – production services
- Linda Burke – production services
- Robin Lynch – art direction
- Annie Leibovitz – photography
- Michael Benabib – photography

== Charts ==
=== Weekly charts ===
Weekly chart performance for Doo-Bop
Chart (1992)	Peak position
American Albums Chart	190
American Jazz Albums Chart	1
American R&B Albums Chart	28

Chart (2026)	Peak position
French Jazz Albums (SNEP)	7
Greek Albums (IFPI)	8
Hungarian Physical Albums (MAHASZ)	32

=== Monthly charts ===
Monthly chart performance for Doo-Bop
Chart (2026)	Peak position
German Jazz Albums (Offizielle Top 100)	16

== Certifications and sales ==
Region	Certification	Certified units/sales
Germany (BVMI)	Gold	10,000^{^}
United States	—	276,000
Summaries
Worldwide	—	300,000
^{^} Shipments figures based on certification alone.
