= Miles & Quincy Live at Montreux =

Miles & Quincy: Live at Montreux

Live album by Miles Davis and Quincy Jones
- Released: August 10, 1993
- Recorded: July 8, 1991
- Venue: Montreux Casino (Montreux)
- Genre: Jazz
- Length: 56:45
- Label: Warner Bros.
- Producer: Quincy Jones

Miles Davis chronology
Miles! Miles! Miles! (1992)	Miles & Quincy: Live at Montreux (1993)	1969 Miles: Festiva de Juan Pins (1993)

Miles Davis live chronology
Merci Miles! Live at Vienne (1991)	Live at Montreux (1991)

Quincy Jones chronology
Back on the Block (1989)	Live at Montreux (1993)	Q's Jook Joint (1995)

Miles & Quincy: Live at Montreux is a collaborative live album by American jazz trumpeter Miles Davis and conductor Quincy Jones. It was recorded at the 1991 Montreux Jazz Festival and released by Warner Bros. Records in 1993.

Miles & Quincy: Live at Montreux charted at number one on the Billboard Top Jazz Albums. It won Davis his eighth competitive Grammy Award, for Best Large Jazz Ensemble Performance.

== Background ==
Miles Davis, who had never revisited past music from his career before, surprised jazz fans when he worked with an ensemble led by Quincy Jones at the Montreux Jazz Festival on July 8, 1991. Quincy had persuaded Miles to play his older music after they met with a psychic at Quincy’s home in New York. The psychic’s dice had fallen into Miles’ lap and they interpreted this as a sign that it was right for him to play his older music. The concert was also a tribute to Gil Evans who had died a few years before. Jones developed the idea of using two orchestras and conducted both the Gil Evans Orchestra and George Gruntz Concert Jazz Band at the concert. The performance also featured guest instrumentalists who played with Davis, including trumpeters Benny Bailey and Wallace Roney, drummer Grady Tate, bassist Carles Benavent, and alto saxophonist Kenny Garrett. Davis was seriously ill when he played the concert, and it was the final album he recorded before his death three months later.

== Critical reception ==
Professional ratings
Review scores
Source	Rating
Allmusic	3/5 stars
Entertainment Weekly	A
The Penguin Guide to Jazz	3/4 stars
Q	3/5 stars
The Rolling Stone Album Guide	5/5 stars
Encyclopedia of Popular Music	4/5 stars

In a contemporary review for Entertainment Weekly, critic David Hajdu gave the album an "A" and said that it is "simply the most exquisite music of tragedy this side of a New Orleans funeral. Don't be mistaken though: This ain't no party. Nor is it a career-summing work of miraculous late-life virtuosity. It's something even rarer: an almost unbearably honest musical expression, without apology or shame, of weakness, age, and pain." Q magazine found the sound thin, but funky and strong. In a less enthusiastic review for Vibe magazine, Greg Tate found Davis' playing occasionally sketchy and felt that the recreations are not on-par with Evans' original arrangements: "[T]he compressed nature of this document—even its shadowy relationship to the original—only serves to highlight the nova-like luminosity of Gil and Miles's work together."

In a retrospective review, Allmusic's Ron Wynn wrote that "not every moment is golden, but the overall session ranks just a bit below the majestic '50s and '60s dates featuring Davis' trumpet and Evans' arrangements." In The Penguin Guide to Jazz, Richard Cook and Brian Morton said that the exaggerated arrangements are redeemed by the audience's enraptured reception and Davis' musical ideas, if not his labored solos: "Jones hails Miles Davis as a 'great painter' and that is exactly what he was. He left some masterpieces, some puzzling abstracts, and a pile of fascinating sketches."

== Track listing ==
No.	Title	Writer(s)	Length
1.	"Introduction" (by Claude Nobs & Quincy Jones)		1:23
2.	"Boplicity"	Cléo Henry	3:40
3.	"Introduction" (to Miles Ahead Medley)		0:09
4.	"Springsville"	John Carisi	3:34
5.	"Maids of Cadiz"	Gil Evans	3:37
6.	"The Duke"	Dave Brubeck	4:01
7.	"My Ship"	Ira Gershwin, Kurt Weil	4:11
8.	"Miles Ahead"	Miles Davis, Gil Evans	3:39
9.	"Blues For Pablo"	Gil Evans	6:04
10.	"Introduction" (to Porgy and Bess Medley)		0:28
11.	"Gone"	Gil Evans	4:09
12.	"Gone, Gone, Gone"	George Gershwin	1:48
13.	"Summertime"	George Gershwin, Ira Gershwin	2:54
14.	"Here Come De Honey Man"	George Gershwin, Ira Gershwin	3:41
15.	"The Pan Piper" (from Sketches of Spain)	Gil Evans	1:40
16.	"Solea" (from Sketches of Spain)	Gil Evans	11:44

== Personnel ==
Musicians

- Miles Davis - trumpet
- Quincy Jones - conductor
- Kenny Garrett - alto saxophone
- Wallace Roney - trumpet, flugelhorn
- The Gil Evans Orchestra
  - Lew Soloff - trumpet
  - Miles Evans - trumpet
  - Tom Malone - trombone
  - Alex Foster - alto and soprano saxophones, flute
  - George Adams - tenor saxophone, flute
  - Gil Goldstein - keyboards
  - Delmar Brown - keyboards
  - Kenwood Dennard - percussion
- The George Gruntz Concert Jazz Band
  - Marvin Stamm - trumpet, flugelhorn
  - John D'earth - trumpet, flugelhorn
  - Jack Walrath - trumpet, flugelhorn
  - John Clark - French horn
  - Tom Varner - French horn
  - Dave Bargeron - euphonium, trombone
  - Earl McIntyre - euphonium, trombone
  - Dave Taylor - bass trombone
  - Howard Johnson - tuba, baritone saxophone
  - Sal Giorgianni - alto saxophone
  - Bob Malach - tenor saxophone, flute, clarinet
  - Larry Schneider - tenor saxophone, oboe, flute, clarinet
  - Jerry Bergonzi - tenor saxophone
  - George Gruntz -piano
  - Mike Richmond - double bass
  - John Riley - percussion
- Additional musicians to George Gruntz Concert Jazz Band
  - Manfred Schoof - trumpet, flugelhorn
  - Ack Van Rooyen - trumpet, flugelhorn
  - Alex Brofsky - French horn
  - Roland Dahinden - trombone
  - Claudio Pontiggia - French horn
  - Anne O’Brien - flute
  - Julian Cawdry - flute
  - Hanspeter Frehner - flute
  - Michel Weber - clarinet
  - Christian Gavillet - bass clarinet, baritone saxophone
  - Tilman Zahn - oboe
  - Dave Seghezzo - oboe
  - Xavier Duss - oboe
  - Judith Wenziker - oboe
  - Christian Raabe - bassoon
  - Reiner Erb - bassoon
  - Xenia Schindler - harp
  - Conrad Herwig - trombone
  - Roger Rosenberg - bass clarinet, baritone saxophone
- Other additional musicians
  - Benny Bailey - trumpet, flugelhorn
  - Carles Benavent - double bass, electric bass on "The Pan Piper" and "Solea"
  - Grady Tate - drums

Production

- Quincy Jones - producer
- Jerry Hey - associate producer
- Claude Nobs - executive producer
- Louise Velazquez - executive producer
- Jolie Levine - production coordinator
- Jeff Gold - art direction
- Jeri Heiden - art direction
- John Heiden - design
- Annie Leibovitz - photography
- Philippe Dutoit - photography

== Charts ==
Chart (1993)	Peak position
U.S. Top Jazz Albums (Billboard)	1
U.S. Top R&B Albums (Billboard)	86

== Certifications and sales ==
Region	Certification	Certified units/sales
Germany (BVMI)	Gold	10,000^{^}
^{^} Shipments figures based on certification alone.

== See also ==
- The Complete Miles Davis at Montreux
- Miles! The Definitive Miles Davis At Montreux Dvd Collection
