= Monica Behan =

American singer, songwriter

Monica Goretti Behan
- Origin: Thousand Islands, New York
- Genres: Smooth jazz
- Occupations: Singer, songwriter, CEO
- Instruments: Vocals, piano
- Years active: 1982–present
- Label: RCA Records
- Website: monicabehan.com

Monica Behan is a singer / songwriter and entrepreneur. She is best known for her top ten hit "World Keeps Spinning" in 1997, on the album Behan Johnson. She began songwriting at age seven and performing live at sixteen, after high school she moved to New York city with her godparents, Abbie Hoffman and Johanna Lawrenson, who introduced her to the counter-culture movement and the venue Max's Kansas City.

As an entrepreneur, Behan formed the music-themed fashion label Goretti with Desiree Kohan.

Behan is the founder and director of Compassionate Care Foundation, a cancer victim advocacy group.

In 2014, Behan suffered a snowmobiling accident which included broken bones and facial lacerations, avoiding plastic-surgery, she developed a line of skincare nutrients which she currently markets as Modicum.

== Discography ==
=== Singles ===
- "World Keeps Spinning"

Chart performance of "World Keeps Spinning"
Chart (Nov 1, 1997)	Peak position
US Adult Alternative Airplay (Billboard)	10

=== Albums ===
- Behan Johnson (1997)
- Ruby (2010)
- Right Where I Need To Be (2015)
