= Pino Daniele =

Italian singer-songwriter and musician (1955–2015)

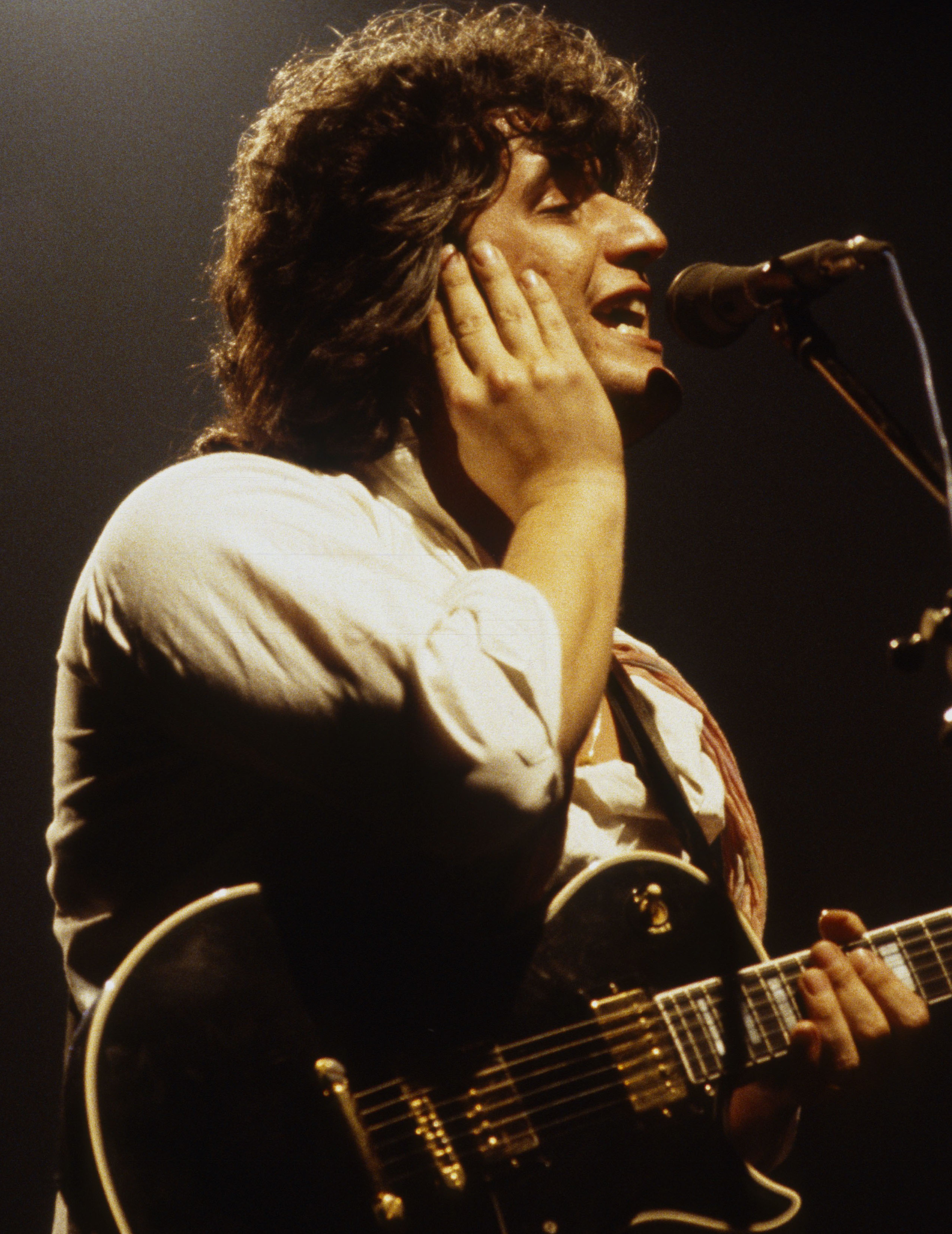
- Pino Daniele performing in 1982
- Born: Giuseppe Daniele; 19 March 1955; Naples, Italy
- Died: 4 January 2015 (aged 59); Rome, Italy
- Occupations: Singer-songwriter; musician
- Years active: 1974–2015
- Musical career
- Genres: Pop rock; blues; jazz
- Instruments: Vocals; guitar
- Labels: CGD; EMI; Polydor; RCA
- Website: pinodaniele.com

Giuseppe "Pino" Daniele (19 March 1955 – 4 January 2015) was an Italian singer-songwriter and musician. His influences covered a wide number of genres, including pop, blues, jazz, and Italian and Middle Eastern music.

== Biography ==
Daniele was born to a working-class family in Naples, his father being a harbor worker. A self-taught guitarist, he began his career as a musician playing for other successful singers of the 1970s. His debut in the Italian music world was in 1977 with the album Terra mia, which proved to be a successful mix of Neapolitan tradition and blues sounds. Daniele defined his music with the term "tarumbò", which indicated a mix of tarantella, blues and rumba. His lyrics also attracted critical praise: written and sung in an intense Neapolitan, they contained strong and bitter accusations against the social injustices of Naples, as well as Italian society in general, and included melancholic personal themes. Several of the later songs are characterized by a free intermingling of English, Italian and Neapolitan passages.

Daniele's talent was confirmed on the following album Pino Daniele (1979). He scored his greatest success in 1980, with Nero a metà ("Half-Black"), which was noted by some authorities as the hallmark of the rebirth of Neapolitan song. In that year Daniele opened the Bob Marley concert at the San Siro stadium in Milan. In 1981 Vai Mo was released. The presence of some of the most renowned musicians of the Neapolitan musical milieu, including James Senese, Enzo Avitabile, Tullio De Piscopo and Tony Esposito, as session men on his albums has also been widely praised.

In 1982, Daniele shifted to a personal and early version of world music: in Bella 'mbriana musicians such as Alphonso Johnson and Wayne Shorter appeared as guest players. In the following year Daniele held a concert in Havana, and later formed a Latin-American band. In 1983 Daniele collaborated with the American singer/guitarist Richie Havens on Common Ground, an album written and played together. His interest in Arabic music is emphasized on Bonne Soirée (1987), while the subsequent Schizzechea With Love (1988) was more Mediterranean-oriented. In the same year he started a collaboration with the Italian actor and director Massimo Troisi: Daniele completed the soundtracks for Troisi's films Le vie del Signore sono finite and Pensavo fosse amore invece era un calesse.

Non calpestare i fiori nel deserto, released in Spring 1995, was an attempt to revive inspiration through African and Ethnic influences, and sold more than 800,000 copies. The subsequent tour ended with a double date with Jazz guitarist Pat Metheny.

In 2010, Daniele played at Crossroads Guitar Festival, having been called by his friend Eric Clapton to perform at Toyota Park in Chicago, playing with Joe Bonamassa and Robert Randolph. In 2011, he performed in concert with Clapton at Cava de' Tirreni stadium.

Daniele died of a heart attack on 4 January 2015, at Sant'Eugenio Hospital in Rome.

== Covers ==
Many artists recorded cover versions of Pino Daniele's songs: among others, Sarah Jane Morris (Alleria on album Cello Song), Randy Crawford (Quanno chiove, in English It's Raining, on album Through the Eyes of Love), Patricia Marx (Quanno chiove, in Portuguese Quando chove, on album Charme do mundo), Marisa Monte (E po' che fa, in Portuguese Bem que se quis, on album MM), and Issac Delgado (Quando, on album Malecon).

== Discography ==
=== Studio albums ===
| Year | Title | Sales | Certifications |
|---|---|---|---|
| 1977 | Terra Mia | | FIMI: Gold |
| 1979 | Pino Daniele | | FIMI: Gold |
| 1980 | Nero a metà | ITA: 300,000 | FIMI: 2× Platinum |
| 1981 | Vai mò | ITA: 250,000 | AFI: Gold |
| 1982 | Bella 'mbriana | | |
| 1984 | Musicante | | |
| 1985 | Ferryboat | ITA: 300,000 | ITA: Platinum |
| 1987 | Bonne Soirée | | |
| 1988 | Schizzechea with Love | | ITA: Platinum |
| 1989 | Mascalzone latino | | ITA: Platinum |
| 1991 | Un uomo in Blues | ITA: 400,000 | ITA: Platinum |
| 1992 | Sotto 'o sole | | ITA: Platinum |
| 1993 | Che Dio ti benedica | | |
| 1995 | Non calpestare i fiori nel deserto | ITA: 800,000 | ITA: 8× Platinum |
| 1997 | Dimmi cosa succede sulla terra | ITA: 1,000,000 | |
| 1999 | Come un Gelato All'equatore | ITA: 300,000 | |
| 2001 | Medina | ITA: 300,000 | FIMI: Gold |
| 2004 | Passi d'autore | | |
| 2005 | Iguana Cafè | ITA: 100,000 | |
| 2007 | Il Mio Nome è Pino Daniele e Vivo Qui | | |
| 2008 | Ricomincio da Trenta | ITA: 90,000 | |
| 2009 | Electric Jam | | FIMI: Gold |
| 2010 | Boogie Boogie Man | | FIMI: Gold |
| 2012 | Le Grande Madre | | |

=== Compilation albums ===
| Year | Title | Sales | Certifications |
|---|---|---|---|
| 1986 | Musica Musica | | |
| 1990 | “Passa 'o Tiempo e Che Fa - I Primi Anni | | |
| 1995 | Nero a metà | | |
| 1997 | Voglio 'o Mare | | |
| 1998 | Yes I Know My Way | ITA: 1,000,000 | |
| 2000 | Studio Collection, Le Origini | | |
| 2000 | Napule è | | |
| 2002 | Amore Senza Fine | | |
| 2004 | The Platinum Collection | | |
| 2005 | Studio Collection | | |
| 2006 | Sucessi D'autore | | FIMI: Gold |
| 2006 | Pino Daniele D.O.C. | | |
| 2006 | Tutto Daniele - Che Male c'e | | FIMI: Gold |
| 2008 | Ricomincio da 30 | | |
| 2008 | The Platinum Collection: The Early Years | | |
| 2008 | I grandi Successi | | |

=== Live albums ===
| Year | Title | Certifications |
|---|---|---|
| 1984 | Sció Live | |
| 1994 | E Sona Mo' | |
| 2002 | Concerto Medina Tour 2001 | |
| 2003 | In Tour | |
| 2006 | Pino Daniele Live @ RTS | |
| 2013 | Tutta n'ata Storia: Vai mo' – Live in Napoli | |
| 2015 | Nero a Metà Live: Il concerto – Milano 22 dicembre 2014 | FIMI: Gold |

=== Soundtracks ===
- Le vie del Signore sono finite (album)|Le vie del Signore sono finite (EMI Italiana, 1988)

=== Singles ===
| Year | Title | Certifications |
|---|---|---|
| 1976 | "Che Calore" | |
| 1977 | "Napule è" | FIMI: Platinum |
| 1979 | "Je so' Pazzo" | FIMI: Gold |
| 1980 | "Quanno Chiove" | FIMI: Gold |
| 1980 | "Nun me scoccià" | |
| 1984 | "Keep On Movin" | |
| 1984 | "Yes I Know My Way" | |
| 1985 | "Ferryboat" | |
| 1987 | "Watch Out" | |
| 1988 | "Tell Me Now" | |
| 1988 | "Jesce juorno/Tell Me Now" | |
| 1991 | "O Scarrafone" | |
| 1991 | "Quando" | FIMI: Platinum |
| 1997 | "Dubbi Non Ho" | FIMI: Gold |
| 1998 | "Amore Senza Fine" | FIMI: Gold |
| 1998 | "Senza Peccato" | |
| 2001 | "Sara Non Piangere" | FIMI: Gold |
| 2006 | "Narcisista In Azione" | |
| 2007 | "Rhum and Coca" | |
| 2008 | "Anema e Core" | |
| 2008 | "O Munn va/L'ironia di Sempre/Acqua 'e Rose" | |
| 2009 | "Il sole Dentro Me" | |
| 2009 | "Dimentica" | |
| 2010 | "Boogie Boogie Man" | |
| 2012 | "Melodramma" | |
| 2012 | "Niente è Come Prima" | |
| 2012 | "Boogie Boogie Man" | |
| 2012 | "Due Scarpe" | |
| 2013 | "Non Si Torna Indietro" | |
