= Chris Pierce =

American musician

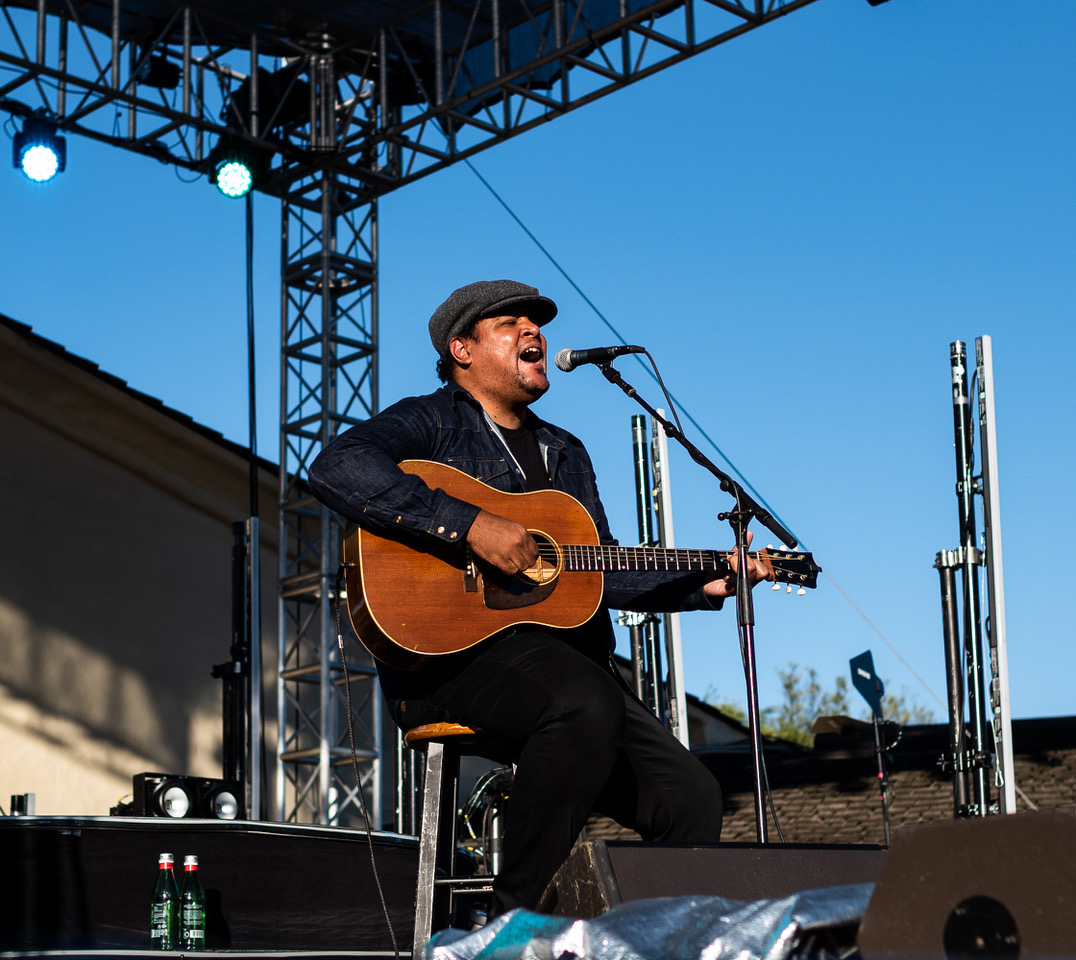
- Chris Pierce performing in Napa, California, in 2019

Background information
- Born: Pasadena, California, U.S.
- Genres: Soul, folk, Americana
- Occupations: Musician, singer-songwriter, guitarist
- Instruments: Vocals, guitar, harmonica
- Years active: 1995–present
- Label: Pierce Records
- Website: chrispierce.com

Chris Pierce is an American singer-songwriter, producer, multi-instrumentalist, radio host, educator, public speaker, wine producer and officiant born and based in California.

== Early life ==
Pierce is from Pasadena, California. He grew up singing in church and playing in bands from an early age and listened to classic soul, rhythm and blues, jazz, gospel and rock and roll recordings. When he was 15 he was diagnosed with otosclerosis which caused him to lose significant hearing. A surgery helped him regain 60% of his hearing in his right year. In his teenage years, he pursued acting and singing in local theater presentations and appeared on notable television shows such as Kids Incorporated, Big Break hosted by Natalie Cole, Star Search and Half and Half.

While still in high school, Pierce began playing gigs with Grammy-nominated rock musician Jon Butcher. After high school he received a scholarship to study jazz at USC. At 19 years old he performed on a US tour with Sonia Dada and later continued on to Moscow, Russia. After touring with Sonia Dada, Pierce came home to Southern California to work on his degree in jazz studies at USC. In 2005, Pierce met Seal at a house party and later joined him as his opening act on a world tour. Pierce says, "I kinda got discovered by him... That opened up a bunch of different things."

== Career ==
For over 3 decades, Pierce has been recording and doing independent road tours. He has opened for Neil Young, B.B. King, Seal, Rodrigo y Gabriela, Jill Scott, Aaron Neville, Colbie Caillat, Al Green, Jamie Cullum, Toots & the Maytals, and Robert Cray. In 2021, Chris Pierce's cover of "No One" by Alicia Keys was featured on the ABC television series A Million Little Things and the single was released by Hollywood Records. Pierce also co-wrote the hit song "We Can Always Come Back to This" which was featured 3 times on the NBC drama This Is Us. The song peaked at #1 on the Billboard Blues Chart and #12 on iTunes's Top 100.

His songs have also been featured in film and television including Crash, Brothers and Sisters, In Plain Sight, True Blood, Eli Stone, What About Brian, Lincoln Heights, Army Wives, North Shore, Half and Half, Dawson's Creek, Sister Act, Great Plains and The Long Shots starring Ice Cube. His single "Are You Beautiful" has been used in a national Banana Republic ad campaign.

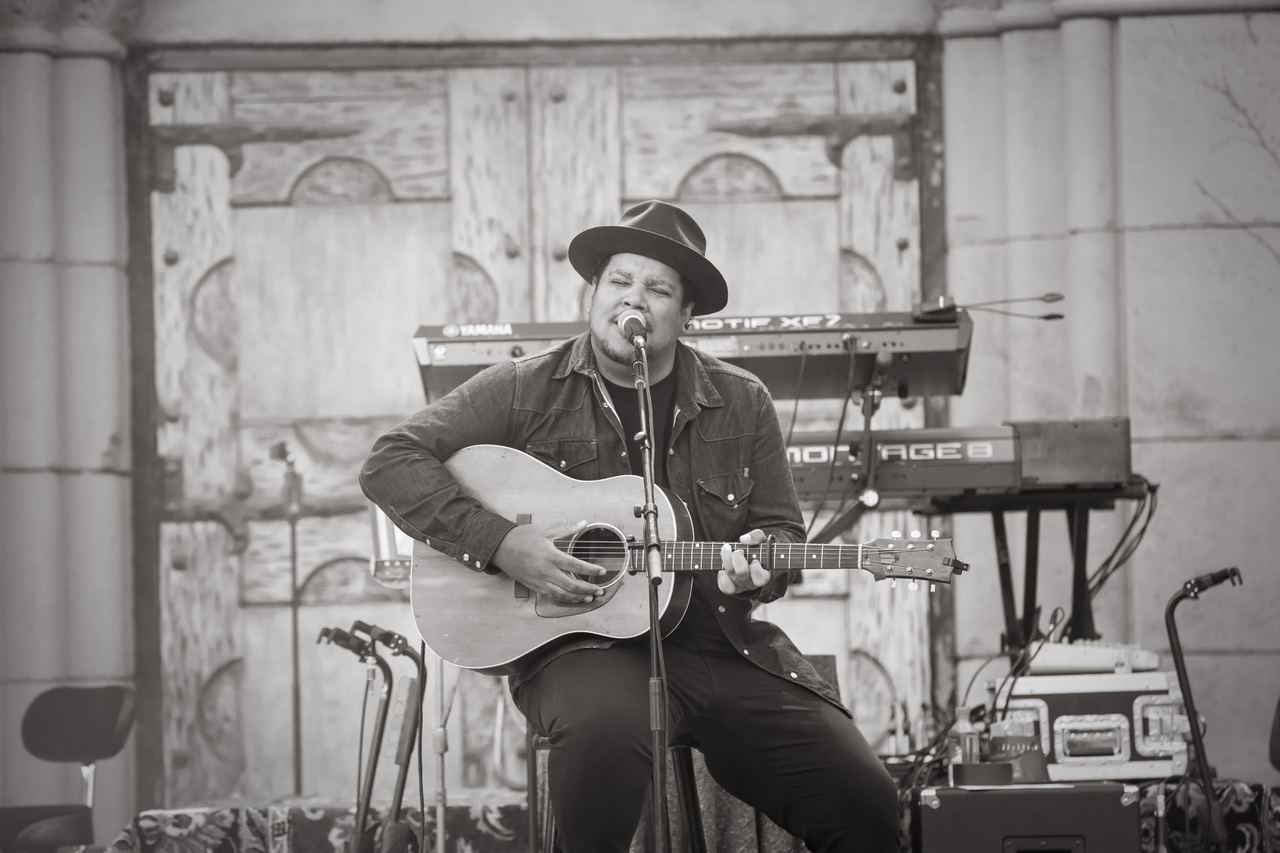
Chris Pierce performing at the Mountain Winery in Saratoga, California (2019)

== Reception ==
Critic Paul Saitowitz of The Press-Enterprise has compared Pierce's voice to Ray Charles, writing that it "fluctuates from delicate falsettos to shrieks reminiscent of Ray Charles". In a concert review, the San Antonio Express-News wrote that he has "one of the most powerful voices going."

Pierce's 2021 album, American Silence garnered critical acclaim from NPR, SiriusXM, The Bluegrass Situation, Acoustic Guitar, No Depression, Rolling Stone, Americana UK and more for its strong racial justice themes. NPR's Robin Hilton said, "I haven't been so deeply, deeply moved by just a person and their guitar like this in a long time.” Rolling Stone wrote, "American Silence is the sound of everyone who's hungry for change, steadying themselves and marching toward a common goal." No Depression noted the timelines of the album's release around the worldwide racial justice uprisings: "Chris Pierce's American Silence is one of those albums that truly feels like a lifetime in the making."

Additionally, his song "Keep On Keeping On" was chosen as KCRW's "Today's Top Tune" and he appeared on KCRW's "Morning Becomes Eclectic" with Nic Harcourt, who selected Pierce's album, Walking on the Earth, as "Best Album of July 2008".

== Personal life ==
Pierce currently resides in California. He married actress Tara Buck in 2012.

== Discography ==
- Liberation Vol. 1 (2002)
- Intimate Moments (2004)
- Static Trampoline (2005)
- Walking on the Earth (2007)
- Chris Pierce Live at the Hotel Cafe (2009)
- I Can Hear You (2011)
- When the Hustle Comes to a Stop (2012)
- Reverend Tall Tree (2015)
- You've Got to Feel It! (2017)
- American Silence (2021)
- Let All Who Will (2023)
- Songs for the Heavy Hearted (2026)
