= Live in Munich (Miles Davis video) =

Video by Miles Davis
- Released: 2002
- Recorded: July 10, 1988
- Venues: Gasteig (Munich, West Germany)
- Genre: Jazz fusion
- Length: 39:36 (DVD)
- Label: Pioneer

Live in Munich is a DVD release of a concert by American jazz musician Miles Davis, recorded on July 10, 1988, at the Gasteig in Munich, West Germany.
