= Napule è =

Single by Pino Daniele

from the album Terra mia
- B-side: "'Na tazzulella 'e cafè"
- Released: 1977
- Genre: Blues; jazz; canzone napoletana
- Length: 3:47
- Label: EMI Italiana
- Songwriter: Pino Daniele

Pino Daniele singles chronology
"Che calore" (1976)	"Napule è" (1977)	"Je so' pazzo" (1979)

Audio
- "Napule è" on YouTube

"Napule è" (Neapolitan pronunciation: [ˈnɑːpəl ˈɛ]; "Naples Is") is an Italian song composed and performed by Pino Daniele. It is considered his signature song.

== Background ==
The song was composed by Daniele in 1973, when he was 18 years old. Daniele initially considered to have it performed by Peppino di Capri. Along with its B-side "'Na tazzulella 'e cafè" and "Cammina cammina", the song was a last-minute addition to his debut album Terra mia.

== Recording and release ==
After listening to the song's demo, producers and label decided the song deserved a more rich, orchestral arrangement than the lo-fi arrangements of the other songs of the album, and the task was entrusted to Antonio Sinagra, a Naples Conservatory professor who was fresh from the arrangements for Roberto De Simone's musical La Gatta Cenerentola. Sinagra also composed the oboes and mandolins intro. Jazz musician Amedeo Tommasi played the piano, but asked to be credited as Amedeo Forte. The single was eventually chosen as leading song of the album, and premiered in a show of the private radio Capitale Eurosound. Daniele performed it in an episode of the RAI musical show Senza Rete.

== Reception ==
The song has been described as a "jewel [...], one of the most striking, poetic and realistic portraits of Naples," and as "regenerating lymph for the new Neapolitan song, the manifesto of a generation's hopes and disillusions."

== Other versions ==
Artists who recorded the song include Mina, Luciano Pavarotti, Gino Paoli, Laura Pausini, Drupi, Teresa De Sio, Fiordaliso, Roberto Murolo, Mario Trevi.

== Track listing ==
No.	Title	Writer(s)	Length
1.	"Napule è"	Pino Daniele	3:47
2.	"'Na tazzulella 'e cafè"	Pino Daniele	3:22

== Charts ==
Original version
Chart (2015)	Peak position
Italy (FIMI)	5

== Certifications ==
Region	Certification	Certified units/sales
Italy (FIMI) Sales since 2009	Platinum	50,000^{‡}
^{‡} Sales+streaming figures based on certification alone.
