= Live Around the World (Miles Davis album) =

Live album by Miles Davis
- Released: May 14, 1996
- Recorded: 1988–1991
- Genres: Jazz fusion, pop
- Length: 70:48
- Label: Warner Bros.
- Producers: Miles Davis (live), Gordon Meltzer (executive)

Miles Davis chronology
The Complete Live at the Plugged Nickel 1965 (1995)	Live Around the World (1996)	Live at the Fillmore East (2001)

Miles Davis live chronology
Miles! Miles! Miles! (1981)	Live Around the World (1988)	Miles in Paris (1989)

Live Around the World is a live album released in 1996 by American jazz musician Miles Davis. The single CD contains live recordings from 1988 to 1991. The album peaked at No. 4 on the Billboard Top Jazz Albums chart.

== Critical reception ==
Professional ratings
Review scores
Source	Rating
AllMusic	4.5/5 stars
Down Beat	4/5 stars
Encyclopedia of Popular Music	3/5 stars
The Village Voice	(dud)
The Penguin Guide to Jazz Recordings	3/4 stars

Writing for AllMusic, Scott Yanow said "no Miles Davis collection is complete without this important set." Down Beat magazine's Jon Andrews said his "once-controversial" pop covers benefited from "expansions and improvisations". Village Voice critic Robert Christgau was less enthusiastic, deeming it a "dud".

== Track listing ==
1. "In a Silent Way" (Joe Zawinul) – 1:49
2. "Intruder" (Miles Davis) – 4:52
3. "New Blues" (Davis) – 5:35
4. "Human Nature" (Steve Porcaro, John Bettis) – 12:48
5. "Mr. Pastorius" (Marcus Miller) – 3:32
6. "Amandla" (Miller) – 5:52
7. "Wrinkle" (Davis) – 7:17
8. "Tutu" (Miller) – 8:53
9. "Full Nelson" (Miller) – 2:48
10. "Time After Time" (Rob Hyman, Cyndi Lauper) – 9:56
11. "Hannibal" (Miller) – 7:22

== Personnel ==
Musicians

- Miles Davis – trumpet
- Foley – lead bass
- Benny Rietveld – bass on tracks (1–6, 9–10)
- Richard Patterson – bass on tracks (7–8, 11)
- Marilyn Mazur – percussion on tracks (1–4, 9)
- Erin Davis – electronic percussion (7–8)
- Ricky Wellman – drums
- Munyungo Jackson – percussion on tracks (5–6, 10)
- Kei Akagi – keyboards on tracks (5–8, 10)
- Joey DeFrancesco – keyboards on tracks (1–2, 4)
- Kenny Garrett – alto saxophone on tracks (1–5, 7, 9, 11), flute on tracks (8, 10)
- Adam Holzman – keyboards on tracks (1–4, 6, 9–10)
- Robert Irving III – keyboards on tracks (3, 9)
- John Beasley – keyboards on track (5)
- Rick Margitza – tenor sax on track (6)
- Deron Johnson – keyboards on track (11)

Production

- Dan Gellert – analog transfer, editing
- Dany Gignoux – booklet, inlay design, photography
- Scott Hull – digital editing, mastering
- Don Kurek – engineer, mixing
- Gordon Meltzer – booklet design, CD art adaptation, compilation producer, cover photo, executive producer, liner notes
- Patrick Murray – engineer, mixing
- Stuart Nicholson – liner notes
- Tom Recchion – art direction, design
- Stine Schyberg – art direction, design
- Jeff Sedlik – photography

== Charts ==
Chart (1996)	Peak position
U.S. Top Jazz Albums (Billboard)	4

== Certifications and sales ==
Region	Certification	Certified units/sales
Germany (BVMI)	Gold	10,000^{^}
^{^} Shipments figures based on certification alone.
