= Amandla (album) =

Studio album by Miles Davis
- Released: May 18, 1989
- Recorded: December 1988 – early 1989
- Genres: Pop jazz, funk, jazz fusion
- Length: 43:16
- Label: Warner Bros.
- Producers: Tommy LiPuma, Marcus Miller, George Duke

Miles Davis chronology
Music from Siesta (1987)	Amandla (1989)	Aura (1989)

Amandla is an album by jazz musician Miles Davis, released in 1989. The word Amandla holds significance in various Nguni languages, including Zulu and Xhosa, where it translates to "power." It is the third collaboration between Miles Davis and producer/bassist Marcus Miller, following their previous works Tutu (1986) and Music from Siesta (1987), and it serves as their final album together.

The album mixes elements of the genres go-go, zouk, funk and jazz, combining electronic instruments with live musicians. The composition "Mr. Pastorius", featuring drummer Al Foster, is a tribute to late jazz bassist Jaco Pastorius. "Catémbe" is a Mozambican and Angolan cocktail of red wine and cola.

== Critical reception ==
Professional ratings
Review scores
Source	Rating
AllMusic	4/5 stars
DownBeat	4/5 stars
Encyclopedia of Popular Music	3/5 stars
Hi-Fi News & Record Review	A*:2
Los Angeles Times	3.5/5 stars
MusicHound Jazz	2/5
The Rolling Stone Album Guide	3/5 stars
The Penguin Guide to Jazz Recordings	3.5/4 stars
Tom Hull – on the Web	B+

In a contemporary review, DownBeat said Amandla possessed "a precise and consistent sound that flows through the shifting instrumental combinations and lingers after the music has stopped". In The Rolling Stone Album Guide (2004), J. D. Considine felt the record sounded "vaguely African" and somewhat conservative because of its reliance on session musicians.

The album was nominated for the Grammy Award for Best Jazz Fusion Performance.

== Track listing ==
All tracks are written by Marcus Miller, except where noted.

No.	Title	Writer(s)	Length
1.	"Catémbe"		5:35
2.	"Cobra"	George Duke	5:15
3.	"Big Time"		5:40
4.	"Hannibal"		5:49
5.	"Jo-Jo"		4:51
6.	"Amandla"		5:20
7.	"Jilli"	John Bigham	5:41
8.	"Mr. Pastorius"		5:41

== Personnel ==
- Miles Davis – trumpet
- Marcus Miller – bass guitar, arrangements (1, 3–8), keyboards (1, 3–6, 8), guitars (1, 4, 7), drums (1), bass clarinet (1–4, 7–8), soprano saxophone (1, 3), additional keyboards (2, 7)
- Foley – guitars (3–4, 7)
- Jean-Paul Bourelly – guitars (3, 5)
- Kenny Garrett – alto saxophone (1, 3–7), soprano saxophone (2)
- Ricky Wellman – drums (3, 7)
- Paulinho da Costa – percussion (4–5)
- Omar Hakim – drums (4, 6)
- Don Alias – percussion (1, 3, 6)
- Mino Cinelu – percussion (1)
- Michael Landau – guitars (2)
- George Duke – keyboards (2), Synclavier (2), arrangements (2)
- Joey DeFrancesco – additional keyboards (2)
- Rick Margitza – tenor saxophone (5)
- Joe Sample – acoustic piano (6)
- Bashiri Johnson – percussion (6)
- John Bigham – keyboards (7), guitars (7), drum programming (7), arrangements (7)
- Billy "Spaceman" Patterson – wah-wah guitar (7)
- Jason Miles – synthesizer programming (8)
- Al Foster – drums (8)

=== Production ===
- Miles Davis – executive producer, cover artwork
- Tommy LiPuma – producer (1, 3–8)
- Marcus Miller – producer (1, 3–8)
- George Duke – producer (2)
- John Bigham – associate producer (7)
- Eric Calvi – recording (1, 3–8)
- Bruce Miller – recording (1, 3–8)
- Erik Zobler – recording (2)
- Al Schmitt – additional recording
- Henry Falco – additional engineer
- Alec Head – additional engineer
- Debi Cornish – assistant engineer
- Kevin Fisher – assistant engineer
- Mitch Gibson – assistant engineer
- Roy Hendrickson – assistant engineer
- Ed Korengo – assistant engineer
- Scott Mabuchi – assistant engineer
- Joe Martin – assistant engineer
- Danny Mormando – assistant engineer
- Dave Wolk – assistant engineer
- Bill Schnee – mixing
- Doug Sax – mastering
- Bibi Green – production coordinator
- Rosemary Kraitz – production coordinator
- Stephanie McCravey – production coordinator
- Jo Gelbard – cover artwork
- Richard Rothman – photography

Studios

- Recorded at Clinton Recording Studios, Electric Lady Studios, The Power Station, Right Track Recording and Quadrasonic Studio (New York City, New York); Le Gonks West (West Hollywood, California); Ocean Way Recording (Hollywood, California).
- Mixed at Bill Schnee Studios (North Hollywood, California).
- Mastered at The Mastering Lab (Hollywood, California).
