= You're Under Arrest (Miles Davis album) =

Studio album by Miles Davis
- Released: April 1985
- Recorded: January 26, 1984 – January 14, 1985
- Studios: Record Plant (New York City, New York)
- Genres: Fusion, jazz-funk
- Length: 43:02
- Label: Columbia
- Producers: Miles Davis, Robert Irving III

Miles Davis chronology
Decoy (1984)	You're Under Arrest (1985)	Tutu (1986)

Professional ratings
Review scores
Source	Rating
AllMusic	3/5 stars
Tom Hull	B
The Penguin Guide to Jazz Recordings	3.5/4 stars
Rolling Stone	(not rated)

You're Under Arrest is a 1985 album recorded by Miles Davis, presenting a mixture of pop covers (including Cyndi Lauper's "Time After Time" and Michael Jackson's "Human Nature"), and original material dealing with politics, racism, pollution and war. It is the first Davis album since On the Corner in 1972 to include electric guitarist John McLaughlin. It was nominated for the Grammy Award for Best Jazz Fusion Performance.

== Background ==
During the recording sessions, bass player Darryl Jones introduced Sting to Davis. Jones had played in Sting’s band, and arranged the meeting as Sting had idolized Davis. Sting was startled when Davis asked if he spoke French; after Sting said yes, Davis asked him to translate the Miranda warning into French and yell it into the microphone over a pre-recorded musical track that was included as the album's first song.

The album was one of Davis's final albums with Columbia Records after a 30-year association before moving to Warner Bros. However, the Davis album Aura was recorded in 1984 for Columbia but not released until 1989, and Columbia released many archival recordings after Davis died in 1991

The album contains an instrumental version of Cyndi Lauper's 1983 song "Time After Time". Lauper later said Davis's interpretation of the song was "[t]he most honored I ever felt".

== Track listing ==
Columbia – FC 40023

No.	Title	Writer(s)	Length
1.	"One Phone Call/Street Scenes"	Miles Davis	4:34
2.	"Human Nature"	John Bettis, Steve Porcaro	4:30
3.	"Intro: MD1/Something's On Your Mind/MD2"	Miles Davis/Hubert Eaves III, James "D-Train" Williams/Miles Davis	7:17
4.	"Ms. Morrisine"	Miles Davis, Morrisine Tynes Irving, Robert Irving III	4:57
5.	"Katia Prelude"	Miles Davis, Robert Irving III	0:40
6.	"Katia"	Miles Davis, Robert Irving III	7:37
7.	"Time After Time"	Cyndi Lauper, Rob Hyman	3:37
8.	"You're Under Arrest"	John Scofield	6:14
9.	"Medley: Jean Pierre/You're Under Arrest/Then There Were None"	Miles Davis/John Scofield/Robert Irving III, Miles Davis	3:23

== Personnel ==
=== Musicians ===
- Miles Davis – trumpet, "Police Voices, Davis Voices" (1), arrangements (1–7, 9), Oberheim OB-Xa (5, 6)
- Robert Irving III – synthesizers (1–4, 7, 9), arrangements (2, 4–7, 9), Yamaha DX7 (5, 6, 8), Korg Polysix and Oberheim OB-Xa (5, 6), organ and clavinet (8), celesta (9)
- John Scofield – guitar (1–3, 7–9), arrangements (8)
- John McLaughlin – all guitars (4), guitar (5, 6)
- Darryl Jones, aka "The Munch" – bass
- Al Foster – drums (1, 7–9)
- Vincent Wilburn – drums (2, 3), Simmons drums (4–6)
- Steve Thornton – percussion, Spanish voice (1)
- Bob Berg – soprano saxophone (1), tenor saxophone (8, 9)
- Sting – French policeman's voice (1)
- Marek Olko – Polish voice (1)
- James "J.R." Prindiville (Jim Rose, road manager) – sound of handcuffs (1)

=== Production ===
- Dr. George Butler – executive producer
- Miles Davis – producer, illustration
- Robert Irving III – producer
- Vincent Wilburn – co-producer
- Eddie Ciletti – engineer, technician
- Ron Lorman – engineer, mixing
- Tom Swift – engineer, mixing
- Nick Joyce – studio technician
- Bob Ludwig – mastering at Masterdisk (New York City, New York)
- Jim Rose – production coordination
- Lane/Donald – art direction
- Anthony Barboza – photography
- Blank & Blank – management
