= Tutu (album) =

- Cover photograph by Irving Penn

Studio album by Miles Davis
- Released: September 29, 1986
- Recorded: February 6 – March 25, 1986
- Studios: Capitol Studios and Ocean Way Recording (Hollywood, CA); Le Gonks (West Hollywood, CA); Clinton Recording Studios and Atlantic Studios (New York, NY)
- Genres: Pop jazz; funk; R&B; electronic pop
- Length: 42:05
- Label: Warner Bros.
- Producers: Marcus Miller; Tommy LiPuma

Miles Davis chronology
You're Under Arrest (1985)	Tutu (1986)	Music from Siesta (1987)

Audio sample
- "Tutu": file; help

Tutu is a studio album by American jazz trumpeter, composer and bandleader Miles Davis, released on September 29, 1986, by Warner Bros. Records. The album is Miles Davis' tribute to Archbishop Desmond Tutu who was a human rights and anti-apartheid activist. It was recorded primarily at Capitol Studios in Los Angeles and Clinton Recording in New York, except the song "Backyard Ritual", which was recorded at Le Gonks in West Hollywood. Davis received the 1986 Best Jazz Instrumental Performance, Soloist Grammy Award for his performance on the album.

== Background ==
Some tracks were originally planned as a collaboration with Prince. Prince later pulled out for undisclosed reasons, although the two remained firm friends and later collaborated on "Can I Play With U" as well. (Davis later covered "Movie Star" and "Penetration" by Prince.) Davis ultimately worked with bassist/multi-instrumentalist Marcus Miller. Miller wrote and arranged all the songs, except "Tomaas" (co-written by Davis), "Backyard Ritual" (by keyboardist George Duke), and "Perfect Way" (by pop group Scritti Politti). The music is strongly inspired by mid-1980s R&B and funk, with heavy use of synthesizers, sequencers and drum machines. Miller performed the bulk of instrumentation on the album, including bass guitar, synthesizers and drum machines, bass clarinet and soprano saxophone.

As indicated in the notes accompanying the album, Tutu was produced by Tommy LiPuma and Marcus Miller, with the exception of "Backyard Ritual", which was co-produced by Duke and LiPuma.

The cover was designed by Eiko Ishioka and photographed by Irving Penn. Eiko Ishioka received the 1987 Grammy Award for Best Album Package for her work as the art director. The original vinyl album featured a colored inner sleeve printed with the album credits on one side and a photograph of Davis's left hand (with middle finger depressed) on the reverse.

== Reception and legacy ==
Professional ratings
Review scores
Source	Rating
AllMusic	2.5/5 stars
The Encyclopedia of Popular Music	4/5 stars
The Guardian	4/5 stars
Jazzwise	5/5 stars
MusicHound Jazz	4/5 stars
The New Zealand Herald	4/5
The Penguin Guide to Jazz	3/4 stars
Record Collector	4/5 stars
The Rolling Stone Album Guide	4/5 stars
The Village Voice	B+

Tutu divided critics and listeners when it was released in 1986. Like Davis's pivotal 1970 album Bitches Brew, Paul Tingen wrote, Tutu became one of the "defining jazz albums" of its decade and attracted a young, new audience while alienating many other jazz listeners because of its heavy reliance on the drum machine and synthesizers. A number of critics felt the music was ingratiatingly elegant, designed for casual listening, and largely a work by Miller. In The New York Times that year, Robert Palmer said it "already sounds curiously dated" and unambitious, featuring synthesizers that "have glutinous textures so overly familiar from the mainstream of late-1970s pop jazz" and electronic rhythms lacking the innovation of contemporary hip hop records.

Others believed the album gave a musical setting for Davis's improvisations to thrive in, comparable to his orchestral recordings with Gil Evans from the late 1950s and early 1960s. The Village Voice critic Robert Christgau deemed it a marginal success but also Davis's "best in a decade". He contended that while Davis's 1970s fusion recordings for Columbia Records were purely improvised jazz-rock, Tutu sounded "more like pop-funk Sketches of Spain, with the starperson's trumpet glancing smartly off an up-to-date panoply of catchy little tunes, beats, and rhythm effects". Jazz musician and writer Mike Zwerin was more enthusiastic, hailing it as "the best jazz record of the decade".

In a retrospective piece, Christgau later wrote that with "shlock" like Tutu and Amandla, Davis was taking advantage of the fusion movement he helped develop while showing "gratifying groove and class". In J. D. Considine's opinion, the album's compositions and improvisations endured well with the passage of time, even though its electronically processed and enigmatic music turned off jazz purists. Writing for Something Else! in 2006, S. Victor Aaron said the best song from Tutu may have been Davis's own composition "Tomaas": "With a reggae beat married to repetitive single note underpinned by some very nifty bass work by Miller, Miles and Miller (also on soprano sax) trade fours and eights in a rare opportunity for Miles to stretch out. Overall, though, the trumpet playing is subdued, probably more constrained by production than declining abilities. Rarely does the mute come off his horn." Reviewing the album for Jazzwise in 2011, Davis' biographer George Cole said, "Tutu was a product of the 80s, a decade where music was often in danger of becoming subservient to technology. But while much of the music from this era is now long forgotten; Tutu continues to thrive; artists such as George Benson, Al Jarreau, and Cassandra Wilson have recorded cover versions of the title track."

Between May and August 2010, Miller performed on the "Tutu Revisited" concert tour with a band comprising Christian Scott on trumpet with Alex Han on saxophone, Federico González Peña on keyboards and Louis Cato on drums. In an interview for JazzTimes, Miller said, "I'm finding that although the music mirrored the times in which it was created, there is so much in the music that still seems relevant today. Although we've replaced some of the super electro sounding elements, the melodies are still very cool. It feels like they have withstood the test of time. People seem to be feeling this music twenty years later."

== Track listing ==
All tracks composed by Marcus Miller except where indicated:

1. "Tutu" – 5:15
2. "Tomaas" – 5:38 (Davis, Marcus Miller)
3. "Portia" – 6:18
4. "Splatch" – 4:46
5. "Backyard Ritual" – 4:49 (George Duke)
6. "Perfect Way" – 4:35 (David Gamson, Green Gartside)
7. "Don't Lose Your Mind" – 5:49
8. "Full Nelson" – 5:06

=== Deluxe edition ===
Disc two (Live from Nice Festival, France, July 1986)

1. "Opening Medley": 'Theme from Jack Johnson', 'Speak', 'That's What Happened' – 15:14
2. "New Blues" – 5:20
3. "The Maze" – 10:15
4. "Human Nature" – 9:04
5. "Portia" – 7:54
6. "Splatch" – 17:10
7. "Time After Time" (Cyndi Lauper, Rob Hyman) – 7:22
8. "Carnival" – 4:20

== Personnel ==
Adapted from liner notes.

=== Musicians ===
- Miles Davis – trumpet
- Marcus Miller – musical arrangements, electric bass, bass clarinet and all other instruments (except 5), additional synthesizer programming (5)
- Jason Miles – synthesizer programming
- Paulinho da Costa – percussion (1, 3–5)
- Bernard Wright – additional synthesizers (2, 7)
- Omar Hakim – drums and percussion (2)
- Adam Holzman – additional synthesizer programming, synthesizer solo (4)
- Steve Reid – additional percussion (4)
- George Duke – musical arrangement and all other instruments (5)
- Michał Urbaniak – electric violin (7)

=== Production ===
- Tommy LiPuma – executive producer, producer
- Marcus Miller – producer (exc. 5)
- Eric Calvi – recording engineer (exc. 5), mixing (2, 6–8)
- Peter Doell – recording engineer (exc. 5)
- Bill Schnee – mixing (1, 3–4)
- Maureen Thompson – assistant engineer (1, 3–4)
- Eddie Garcia – assistant engineer (2, 6–8)
- George Duke – producer (5)
- Erik Zobler – recording and mixing engineer (5)
- Doug Sax – mastering at The Mastering Lab (Hollywood)
- Larry Fishman – production assistant
- Eiko Ishioka – art direction
- Susan Welt – design
- Irving Penn – photography

== Charts ==
1986 chart performance for Tutu
Chart (1986)	Peak position
Dutch Albums (Album Top 100)	46
Swedish Albums (Sverigetopplistan)	33
Swiss Albums (Schweizer Hitparade)	27
UK Albums (Official Charts)	74
US Billboard 200	141

2026 chart performance for Tutu
Chart (2026)	Peak position
Hungarian Physical Albums (MAHASZ)	14

== Certifications and sales ==
Certifications for Tutu
Region	Certification	Certified units/sales
France (SNEP)	Gold	100,000^{*}
^{*} Sales figures based on certification alone.

== Bibliography ==
- Christgau, Robert (1990). Christgau's Record Guide: The '80s. Pantheon Books. ISBN 067973015X.
- Considine, J. D.; et al. (2004). Brackett, Nathan; Hoard, Christian (eds.). The New Rolling Stone Album Guide: Completely Revised and Updated 4th Edition. Simon & Schuster. ISBN 0-7432-0169-8.
- Cook, Richard; Morton, Brian (1992). The Penguin Guide to Jazz on CD, LP and Cassette. Penguin Books. ISBN 0140153640.
