= Seven Steps: The Complete Columbia Recordings of Miles Davis 1963–1964 =

Box set by Miles Davis
- Released: September 28, 2004
- Recorded: April 16, 1963 – September 19, 1964
- Genre: Jazz
- Length: 7:07:40
- Label: Columbia/Legacy
- Producers: Bob Belden; Michael Cuscuna (reissue)

The Miles Davis Series chronology
(Box 2); Miles Davis & Gil Evans: The Complete Columbia Studio Recordings (1996)	Seven Steps: The Complete Columbia Recordings of Miles Davis 1963–1964 (2004)	(Box 4); The Complete Studio Recordings of The Miles Davis Quintet 1965–1968 (1998)

Seven Steps: The Complete Columbia Recordings of Miles Davis 1963–1964 is a box set of studio and concert recordings by Miles Davis for Columbia over a two-year period. Instead of focusing on a particular collaboration or session period, it focuses on the time period in between the solidified lineups of the first and second Great Quintets, starting with Ron Carter's introduction and finishing with the establishment of Wayne Shorter in the lineup.

== Reception ==
Professional ratings
Review scores
Source	Rating
Rolling Stone	3.5/5 stars
AllMusic	4/5 stars

AllMusic awarded the box set four stars.

== Albums ==
The third chronologically in the series of Miles Davis box sets issued by Columbia, the set includes material from the albums:

- Seven Steps to Heaven (1963)
- Quiet Nights (1963) (One track only)
- Miles Davis in Europe (1964)
- My Funny Valentine (1965)
- 'Four' & More (1966)
- Miles in Tokyo (1969)
- Miles in Berlin (1965)

== Track listing ==
Disc one
No.	Title	Original Release	Length
1.	"Joshua"	Previously Unreleased	5:24
2.	"I Fall in Love Too Easily"	Seven Steps to Heaven	6:44
3.	"Baby Won't You Please Come Home"	Seven Steps to Heaven	8:25
4.	"So Near, So Far"	Directions	5:11
5.	"Basin Street Blues"	Seven Steps to Heaven	10:27
6.	"Seven Steps to Heaven (Take 3)"	Previously Unreleased	5:29
7.	"Seven Steps to Heaven (Take 5)"	Previously Unreleased	6:11
8.	"Summer Night"	Quiet Nights	6:01

- Track 1 incorrectly indexed as "Album Version", the master take of the song can be found on Disc 2
- Track 4 incorrectly indexed as "Album Version", however it is available as a Bonus Track on the 2005 reissue of Seven Steps to Heaven
- Track 8 also found as a Bonus Track on the 2005 reissue of Seven Steps to Heaven

Disc two
No.	Title	Original Release	Length
1.	"Seven Steps to Heaven (Rehearsal Take)"	Previously Unreleased	6:57
2.	"Seven Steps to Heaven"	Seven Steps to Heaven	6:23
3.	"So Near, So Far"	Seven Steps to Heaven	6:56
4.	"Joshua"	Seven Steps to Heaven	6:58
5.	"Introduction by Andre Francis"	In Europe	1:00
6.	"Autumn Leaves"	In Europe	13:55
7.	"Milestones"	In Europe	9:17
8.	"I Thought About You"	In Europe	11:48

Disc three
No.	Title	Original Release	Length
1.	"Joshua"	In Europe	11:36
2.	"All of You"	In Europe	16:54
3.	"Walkin'"	In Europe	16:14
4.	"Bye Bye Blackbird"	Previously Unreleased	16:47
5.	"Bye Bye (Theme)"	Previously Unreleased	6:06

- Tracks 4 and 5 are the final numbers from the concert In Europe was recorded on. Both were left off of previous and future reissues due to CD limitations.

Disc four
No.	Title	Original Release	Length
1.	"Introduction by Mort Fega"	Previously Unreleased	2:49
2.	"Autumn Leaves"	Previously Unreleased	10:40
3.	"So What"	'Four' & More	9:11
4.	"Stella by Starlight"	My Funny Valentine	12:54
5.	"Walkin'"	'Four' & More	8:07
6.	"All of You"	My Funny Valentine	14:40
7.	"Go-Go (Theme and Announcement)"	'Four' & More	1:44

Disc five
No.	Title	Original Release	Length
1.	"Introduction by Billy Taylor"	Previously Unreleased	0:44
2.	"All Blues"	My Funny Valentine	8:53
3.	"My Funny Valentine"	My Funny Valentine	14:55
4.	"Joshua"	'Four' & More	9:32
5.	"I Thought About You"	My Funny Valentine	11:15
6.	"Four"	'Four' & More	6:17
7.	"Seven Steps to Heaven"	'Four' & More	7:45
8.	"There Is No Greater Love"	'Four' & More	10:03
9.	"Go-Go (Theme and Re-Introduction)"	'Four' & More	1:45

- All tracks from Discs Four and Five come from the same recording at Philharmonic Hall, which would be split into the slow tracks on My Funny Valentine and the fast tracks on 'Four' and More.

Disc six
No.	Title	Original Release	Length
1.	"Introduction by Teruo Isono"	Miles in Tokyo	1:10
2.	"If I Were a Bell"	Miles in Tokyo	10:15
3.	"My Funny Valentine"	Miles in Tokyo	12:48
4.	"So What"	Miles in Tokyo	8:03
5.	"Walkin'"	Miles in Tokyo	9:13
6.	"All of You"	Miles in Tokyo	11:18
7.	"Go-Go (Theme)"	Miles in Tokyo	1:20

Disc seven
No.	Title	Original Release	Length
1.	"Milestones"	Miles in Berlin	8:57
2.	"Autumn Leaves"	Miles in Berlin	12:39
3.	"So What"	Miles in Berlin	10:27
4.	"Stella by Starlight"	Miles in Berlin	12:54
5.	"Walkin'"	Miles in Berlin	10:39
6.	"Go-Go (Theme)"	Miles in Berlin	1:46

== Personnel ==
- Miles Davis – trumpet
- George Coleman – tenor saxophone (Discs 1–5)
- Sam Rivers – tenor saxophone (Disc 6)
- Wayne Shorter – tenor saxophone (Disc 7)
- Victor Feldman – piano (Disc 1)
- Herbie Hancock – piano (Discs 2–7)
- Ron Carter – double bass
- Frank Butler – drums (Disc 1)
- Tony Williams – drums (Discs 2–7)
