= Miles Davis' Greatest Hits =

Compilation album by Miles Davis
- Released: May 1969
- Recorded: 1956–1965
- Genre: Jazz
- Length: 73:45
- Label: Columbia
- Producer: Teo Macero (Original)

Miles Davis chronology
Filles de Kilimanjaro (1969)	Miles Davis' Greatest Hits (1969)	In a Silent Way (1969)

Miles Davis' Greatest Hits is a compilation album by Miles Davis originally released in 1969 and re-released in 1997 on CD with different recordings of tracks 3, 4 and 8.

== Track listing 1997 CD reissue ==
1. "Seven Steps to Heaven" (Victor Feldman, Miles Davis) – 6:26
  Available on Seven Steps to Heaven
2. "All Blues" [live] (Davis) – 8:54
  Available on My Funny Valentine
3. "Someday My Prince Will Come" (Larry Morey, Frank E. Churchill) – 9:11
  Available on Someday My Prince Will Come
4. "Walkin'" [live] [edited] (Richard Carpenter) – 13:11
  Unedited version available on In Person Friday and Saturday Nights at the Blackhawk, Complete
5. "My Funny Valentine" [live] (Richard Rodgers, Lorenz Hart) – 5:10
  Available on My Funny Valentine
6. "E.S.P." (Wayne Shorter) – 5:32
  Available on E.S.P.
7. "'Round Midnight" (Thelonious Monk, Cootie Williams, Bernie Hanighen) – 5:58
  Available on 'Round About Midnight
8. "So What" (Davis) – 9:23
  Available on Kind of Blue

== Personnel & Recording date ==
Note: tracks 3, 4 and 8 of the original 1969 edition have different personnel and recording dates.

1. "Seven Steps to Heaven"
  Miles Davis, trumpet; George Coleman, tenor sax; Herbie Hancock, piano; Ron Carter, bass; Tony Williams, drums.
  Recorded 5/14/63 at Columbia 30th Street Studio, New York, NY.
2. "All Blues"
  Miles Davis, trumpet; George Coleman, tenor sax; Herbie Hancock, piano; Ron Carter, bass; Tony Williams, drums.
  Recorded 2/12/64 at the Philharmonic Hall at Lincoln Center, New York, NY.
3. "Someday My Prince Will Come"
  Miles Davis, trumpet; John Coltrane, tenor sax; Hank Mobley, tenor sax; Wynton Kelly, piano; Paul Chambers, bass; Jimmy Cobb, drums.
  Recorded 3/20/61 at Columbia 30th Street Studio, New York NY.
4. "Walkin'"
  Miles Davis, trumpet; Hank Mobley, tenor sax; Wynton Kelly, piano; Paul Chambers, bass; Jimmy Cobb, drums.
  Recorded 4/21/61 at the Black Hawk Club, San Francisco, CA.
5. "My Funny Valentine"
  Miles Davis, trumpet; George Coleman, tenor sax; Herbie Hancock, piano; Ron Carter, bass; Tony Williams, drums.
  Recorded 2/12/64 at the Philharmonic Hall at Lincoln Center, New York, NY.
6. "E.S.P."
  Miles Davis, trumpet; Wayne Shorter, tenor sax; Herbie Hancock, piano; Ron Carter, bass; Tony Williams, drums.
  Recorded 1/20/65 at Columbia Studio, Los Angeles, CA.
7. "'Round Midnight"
  Miles Davis, trumpet; John Coltrane, tenor sax; Red Garland, piano; Paul Chambers, bass; Philly Joe Jones, drums.
  Recorded 9/10/56 at Columbia 30th Street Studio, New York, NY.
8. "So What"
  Miles Davis, trumpet; John Coltrane, tenor sax; Cannonball Adderley, alto sax; Bill Evans, piano; Paul Chambers, bass; Jimmy Cobb, drums.
  Recorded 3/2/1959 at Columbia 30th Street Studio, New York, NY.

=== Production ===
- Original Recordings Produced by Irving Townsend, George Avakian, Teo Macero
- Reissue Produced by Nedra Olds-Neal
- C 1997 Sony Music Entertainment Inc./Originally released 1969 Sony Music Entertainment Inc./"Columbia" is the exclusive trademark of Sony Music Entertainment Inc. / "Legacy" and L are trademark of Sony Music Entertainment Inc./Distribution Sony Music 01-065418-10
