= Miles in Tokyo =

1969 live album by Miles Davis

Live album by Miles Davis
- Released: June 6, 1969
- Recorded: July 14, 1964
- Venues: Tokyo Kōsei Nenkin Kaikan; Shinjuku, Tokyo, Japan
- Genre: Jazz
- Length: 51:14 (LP); 53:59 (CD)
- Label: CBS/Sony
- Producer: Kiyoshi Itoh

Miles Davis chronology
In a Silent Way (1969)	Miles in Tokyo (1969)	Bitches Brew (1970)

Miles Davis live chronology
Four & More (1964)	Miles in Tokyo (1964)	Miles in Berlin (1964)

Alternative Cover
- 1970s Reissue

Professional ratings
Review scores
Source	Rating
AllMusic	4.5/5 stars
All About Jazz	(favorable)

Miles in Tokyo is a live album recorded on July 14, 1964, by the Miles Davis Quintet at the Tokyo Kōsei Nenkin Kaikan, Shinjuku, Tokyo, Japan. It was released in the United States on CD in 2005 and is the first recording of Davis in Japan. It is the only album to showcase an early incarnation of his Second Great Quintet featuring Sam Rivers on tenor saxophone, following George Coleman's departure; after this, Wayne Shorter's appointment completed the classic lineup that recorded such albums as ESP and Miles Smiles, through to Miles in the Sky.

== Track listing ==
=== Original release ===
Side one
No.	Title	Writer(s)	Length
1.	"Introduction by Teruo Isono"
2.	"If I Were a Bell"	Frank Loesser	10:18
3.	"My Funny Valentine"	Richard Rodgers; Lorenz Hart	12:45
Total length:			23:03

Side two
No.	Title	Writer(s)	Length
1.	"So What"	Miles Davis	7:50
2.	"Walkin'"	Richard Henry Carpenter	9:11
3.	"All of You"	Cole Porter	11:10
4.	"Theme and Announcement"
Total length:			28:11

=== Reissue CD (COL 519507 2, 2005) ===
1. "Introduction by Teruo Isono" - 1:10
2. "If I Were a Bell" (Frank Loesser) – 10:14
3. "My Funny Valentine" (Richard Rodgers, Lorenz Hart) – 12:45
4. "So What" (Miles Davis) – 8:02
5. "Walkin'" (Richard H. Carpenter) – 9:11
6. "All of You" (Cole Porter) – 11:18
7. "Go-Go (Theme) + closing announcement" (Miles Davis) - (1:19)

== Personnel ==
=== The Miles Davis Quintet ===
- Miles Davis – trumpet
- Sam Rivers – tenor saxophone
- Herbie Hancock – piano
- Ron Carter – acoustic bass
- Tony Williams – drums

=== Production ===
- Recording Producer - Kiyoshi Itoh
- Recording Engineer - Kenichi Handa, Nippon Broadcasting System, Inc.
- Cover Photography - Akiyoshi Miyashita
- Album Design - Mituru Yamada, Kiyoshi Itoh

=== 2005 CD Reissue ===
- Reissue Producer - Michael Cuscuna and Bob Belden
- Remastered - Mark Wilder at Sony Music Studios, New York, NY.
- Project Director - Seth Rothstein
- Legacy A&R - Steve Berkowitz
- A&R Coordination - Stacey Boyle
- Reissue Art Direction - Howard Fritzson
- Reissue Design - Randall Martin
- Photography - Akiyoshi Miyashita
- Packaging Manager - Norm Elrod
- Liner Note - Takao Ogawa
