= Miles Davis in Europe =

Live album by Miles Davis
- Released: July 13, 1964
- Recorded: July 27, 1963
- Venues: Festival Mondial, du Jazz Antibes, France
- Genre: Jazz
- Length: 60:54
- Label: Columbia
- Producer: Teo Macero

Miles Davis chronology
Miles & Monk at Newport (1964)	Miles Davis in Europe (1964)	My Funny Valentine (1965)

Miles Davis live chronology
Miles Davis at Carnegie Hall (1961)	Miles Davis in Europe (1963)	Live at the 1963 Monterey Jazz Festival (1963)

Professional ratings
Review scores
Source	Rating
AllMusic	4/5 stars

Miles Davis in Europe is a live album by Miles Davis, released in 1964. It was the first full album by the first incarnation of the "Second Quintet" featuring George Coleman, Herbie Hancock, Ron Carter and Tony Williams, whose first recordings with Davis had made up half of the album Seven Steps to Heaven.

The final songs of the concert, "Bye Bye Blackbird" and "The Theme", were released only on the box set Seven Steps: The Complete Columbia Recordings of Miles Davis 1963–1964. On the original LP, some of the tenor sax and piano solos were edited, although it still offered nearly an hour of music.

The album was nominated for a Grammy Award: Best Instrumental Jazz Performance, Small Group or Soloist with Small Group.

== Track listing ==
=== Original LP ===
Columbia – CS 8983:

Side one
No.	Title	Writer(s)	Length
1.	"Introduction by Andre Francis"		0:15
2.	"Autumn Leaves"	Jacques Prévert, Johnny Mercer, Joseph Kosma	11:40
3.	"Milestones"	Miles Davis	9:15
4.	"Joshua"	Victor Feldman	9:30

Side two
No.	Title	Writer(s)	Length
1.	"All of You"	Cole Porter	13:58
2.	"Walkin'"	Richard Carpenter	16:16
Total length:			60:54

=== CD reissue ===
Columbia – CK 93583:

No.	Title	Writer(s)	Length
1.	"Introduction by Andre Francis"		0:46
2.	"Autumn Leaves"	Jacques Prévert, Johnny Mercer, Joseph Kosma	13:52
3.	"Milestones"	Miles Davis	9:17
4.	"I Thought About You"	Jimmy Van Heusen, Johnny Mercer	11:44
5.	"Joshua"	Victor Feldman	11:27
6.	"All of You"	Cole Porter	16:49
7.	"Walkin'"	Richard Carpenter	16:15
Total length:			80:10

== Personnel ==
- Miles Davis – trumpet
- George Coleman – tenor saxophone
- Herbie Hancock – piano
- Ron Carter – bass
- Tony Williams – drums
