= In Person at the Blackhawk, San Francisco, Vols. 1 & 2 =

In Person at the Blackhawk, San Francisco
- Volume I: Friday Night

Live album by Miles Davis
- Released: September 1961
- Recorded: April 21–22, 1961
- Venues: Black Hawk; San Francisco
- Genres: Jazz; hard bop; post-bop
- Length: 53:29, 57:46
- Labels: Columbia; CL 1669/CL 1670 (mono); CS 8469/CS 8470 (stereo)
- Producer: Irving Townsend

Miles Davis chronology
Steamin' with the Miles Davis Quintet (1961)	In Person at the Blackhawk, San Francisco (1961)	Miles Davis at Carnegie Hall (1962)

Miles Davis live chronology
Jazz at the Plaza Vol. I (1958)	In Person at the Blackhawk, San Francisco (1961)	Miles Davis at Carnegie Hall (1961)

In Person at the Blackhawk, San Francisco
- Volume II: Saturday Night

Professional ratings
Review scores
Source	Rating
AllMusic	(Vol. 1)
AllMusic	(Vol. 2)
AllMusic	4.5/5 stars
PopMatters	(positive)
The Penguin Guide to Jazz Recordings	4/4 stars
Tom Hull	A−

In Person at the Blackhawk, San Francisco, Vols. 1 & 2 are a pair of separate but related live albums by Miles Davis recorded at the Black Hawk nightclub in San Francisco on April 21 & 22, 1961, respectively, and released by Columbia September that same year, as In Person Friday Night at the Blackhawk, San Francisco, Volume 1 and In Person Saturday Night at the Blackhawk, San Francisco, Volume 2.

== Background ==
These sets, performed with recording in mind, forged new ground for jazz musician Miles Davis, who had never previously been recorded live in a club with his combo. Although the pair were re-released several times, the complete sets were not commercially available until they were released in 2003 as In Person Friday and Saturday Nights at the Blackhawk, Complete.

== Critical reception ==
AllMusic's Thom Jurek writes of the "underappreciated" quintet: "What is most remarkable is the way Kelly fits into this particular blend of the Miles band. Kelly's interplay with Chambers is especially brilliant, because his sense of blues phrasing inside counterpoint harmony is edgy and large, with left-hand chords in the middle register rather than sharp right-hand runs to accentuate choruses. Davis himself has never played with more intensity and muscularity on record than he does here. He is absolutely fierce, both on the Friday night and Saturday night sets.... It is difficult to recommend this set over Saturday Night or vice versa; Miles fans will need both to fully appreciate how special this engagement with this particular band was."

== Track listing ==
=== In Person Friday Night at the Blackhawk, San Francisco, Volume 1 ===
All tracks are written by Miles Davis, except as noted.

Side one
No.	Title	Writer(s)	Length
1.	"Walkin'"	Carpenter	14:20
2.	"Bye Bye Blackbird"	Dixon, Henderson	10:02

Side two
No.	Title	Writer(s)	Length
1.	"All of You"	Cole Porter	10:30
2.	"No Blues"		9:09
3.	"Bye Bye/The Theme"		2:36
4.	"Love, I've Found You"	Moore, Small	1:59

=== In Person Saturday Night at the Blackhawk, San Francisco, Volume 2 ===
All tracks are written by Miles Davis, except as noted.

Side one
No.	Title	Writer(s)	Length
1.	"Well, You Needn't"	Thelonious Monk	4:42
2.	"Fran-Dance"		6:06
3.	"So What"		12:44

Side two
No.	Title	Writer(s)	Length
1.	"Oleo"	Sonny Rollins	5:12
2.	"If I Were a Bell"	Frank Loesser	8:40
3.	"Neo"		12:51

== Personnel ==
=== The Miles Davis Quintet ===
- Miles Davis – trumpet
- Hank Mobley – tenor saxophone
- Wynton Kelly – piano
- Paul Chambers – bass
- Jimmy Cobb – drums
