= Live at the 1963 Monterey Jazz Festival =

Live album by Miles Davis
- Released: July 31, 2007
- Recorded: September 20, 1963
- Venue: Monterey Jazz Festival
- Genre: Jazz music
- Length: 51:24
- Label: Monterey Jazz Festival Records; MJFR-30310
- Producer: Tim "T-Bone" Jackson, Glen Barros

Miles Davis chronology
Amsterdam Concert (2005)	Live at the 1963 Monterey Jazz Festival (2007)	Bitches Brew Live (2011)

Miles Davis live chronology
Miles Davis in Europe (1963)	Live at the 1963 Monterey Jazz Festival (1963)	My Funny Valentine (1964)

Professional ratings
Review scores
Source	Rating
AllMusic	4/5 stars
DownBeat	4.5/5 stars

Live at the 1963 Monterey Jazz Festival is a live album by Miles Davis recorded on September 20, 1963 and released July 31, 2007. Davis searched for new musicians for his quintet, after splitting with saxophonist John Coltrane in 1960. The new quintet consists of saxophonist George Coleman, pianist Herbie Hancock, bassist Ron Carter and drummer Tony Williams. It was recorded at the Monterey Jazz Festival in the early fall of 1963.

== Background ==
Critics place the show in a "transitional" phase that saw Davis move from his first great quintet to the second one. In between had been the famous sextet (with Cannonball Adderley, Bill Evans, and John Coltrane), which had broken up by 1961, and Davis was in something of a lull, with no studio projects and a difficult live reputation. He was suffering severely from sickle cell disease, and having canceled on a number of appearances he had a hard time getting engagements and was being sued by promoters—and as a result found it hard to form a steady group and offer them a regular paycheck. Hank Mobley (in 1961) and Wynton Kelly, Paul Chambers, and Jimmy Cobb (1962) had left him, and he needed to form a group to play dates at the Black Hawk in San Francisco. The band he formed, with Frank Strozier (alto saxophone), Harold Mabern (piano), Ron Carter (bass), Frank Butler (drums), and George Coleman (tenor) gave him the nucleus the next few years. With a few personnel changes, this group started recording Seven Steps to Heaven, in April 1963 in LA, and a few more changes later, the second great quintet, with Davis, Coleman, Carter, Herbie Hancock (piano), and Tony Williams (drums), was complete. John Fordham praises Williams's "whirlwind" drumming.

Stuart Nicholson, writing for Jazzwise, sees the album as a kind of missing step between the live recordings made in France and released on The Bootleg Series, Vol. 8 and the last studio albums he recorded with the second great quintet, and praises the recording: "There is certainly a step change in the quality of recorded sound with the Monterey recordings, but little change in the basic repertoire – 'Autumn Leaves', 'So What', 'Stella by Starlight', 'Walkin'' – with further intimations of pushing these songs to breaking point, with the single exception of 'The Theme' that evokes the memory of Davis's previous rhythm section of Wynton Kelly, Paul Chambers and Jimmy Cobb from the previous band."

== Track listing ==
All tracks are written by Miles Davis, except as noted.

No.	Title	Writer(s)	Length
1.	"Waiting for Miles"		0:41
2.	"Autumn Leaves"	Jacques Prévert; Johnny Mercer; Joseph Kosma	11:24
3.	"So What"		11:20
4.	"Stella by Starlight"	Ned Washington; Victor Young	14:35
5.	"Walkin'"	Richard Carpenter	12:48
6.	"The Theme"		1:16
Total length:			51:24

== Personnel ==
=== The Miles Davis Quintet ===
- Miles Davis – trumpet
- George Coleman – tenor saxophone
- Herbie Hancock – piano
- Ron Carter – bass
- Tony Williams – drums

=== Production ===
- Greg Allen – art director, designer
- Shawn Anderson – project assistant
- Rikka Arnold – editor
- Ray Avery – photograph
- Glen Barros – producer
- Chris Clough – production assistant
- Larissa Collins – art director, designer
- Ben Conrad – project assistant
- Simone Giuliani – A&R assistant, digital editor
- Wally Heider – engineer
- Mary Hogan – project assistant
- Tim "T-Bone" Jackson – producer
- Stuart Kremsky – project assistant
- Jesse Nichols – project assistant
- Jason Olaine – A&R, digital editor
- Randy Rood – project assistant
- Joe Tarantino – mastering

== Charting history ==
=== Album ===
Chart	Peak chart position
Billboard Top Jazz Albums	8
