= Miles Davis & Gil Evans: The Complete Columbia Studio Recordings =

Box set by Miles Davis and Gil Evans
- Released: 1996
- Recorded: May 6, 1957 – February 16, 1968
- Genre: Jazz
- Length: 426:38
- Label: Columbia/Legacy
- Producers: Phil Schaap & Bob Belden
- Compiler: Phil Schaap

The Miles Davis Series chronology
| (Box 1); The Complete Columbia Recordings of Miles Davis with John Coltrane (2000) | Miles Davis & Gil Evans: The Complete Columbia Studio Recordings (1996) | (Box 3); Seven Steps: The Complete Columbia Recordings of Miles Davis 1963–1964 (2004) |

Professional ratings
Review scores
| Source | Rating |
|---|---|
| AllMusic | 5/5 stars |
| Rolling Stone | (favorable) |
| The Penguin Guide to Jazz Recordings | 4/4 stars |

Miles Davis & Gil Evans: The Complete Columbia Studio Recordings is a box set of music by jazz musicians Miles Davis and Gil Evans originally released on CD in 1996 and remastered and re-released in 2004. It collects work from 1957 through 1968 at Columbia Records recording studios.

Miles Davis and Gil Evans had worked together on Davis's landmark album Birth of the Cool, recorded in 1949–1950. Evans was a distinguished soloist, but it was his role as arranger that is well-illustrated here with alternate and working takes.

== Track listing ==
=== Disc 1 – Miles Ahead ===
| No. | Title | Original Release | Length |
|---|---|---|---|
| 1. | "Springsville" (master) | Miles Ahead | 3:28 |
| 2. | "The Maids of Cadiz" (master) | Miles Ahead | 3:59 |
| 3. | "The Duke" (master) | Miles Ahead | 3:28 |
| 4. | "My Ship" (master) | Miles Ahead | 4:28 |
| 5. | "Miles Ahead" (master) | Miles Ahead | 3:29 |
| 6. | "Blues For Pablo" (master) | Miles Ahead | 5:19 |
| 7. | "New Rhumba" (master) | Miles Ahead | 4:35 |
| 8. | "The Meaning of the Blues" (master) | Miles Ahead | 2:50 |
| 9. | "Lament" (master) | Miles Ahead | 2:16 |
| 10. | "I Don't Wanna Be Kissed (By Anyone But You)" (master) | Miles Ahead | 3:07 |
| 11. | "Springsville" (remake take 7) | Previously unreleased | 3:16 |
| 12. | "The Maids of Cadiz" (take 1) | Previously unreleased | 3:57 |
| 13. | "The Duke" (take 11) | Previously unreleased | 3:32 |
| 14. | "My Ship" (take 1) | Previously unreleased | 4:23 |
| 15. | "Miles Ahead" (take 4) | Previously unreleased | 3:32 |
| 16. | "Blues For Pablo" (take 1) | Previously unreleased | 3:01 |
| 17. | "New Rhumba" (take 5) | Previously unreleased | 4:45 |
| 18. | "The Meaning of the Blues" (rehearsal take) | Previously unreleased | 2:49 |
| 19. | "Lament" (rehearsal take) | Previously unreleased | 2:20 |
| 20. | "I Don't Wanna Be Kissed (By Anyone But You)" (take 8) | Previously unreleased | 3:11 |
| 21. | "[pause track]" (editor added "track" to separate discs) | | 0:06 |

=== Disc 2 – Porgy and Bess ===
| No. | Title | Original Release | Length |
|---|---|---|---|
| 1. | "Buzzard Song" (master) | Porgy and Bess | 4:09 |
| 2. | "Bess, You Is My Woman Now" (master) | Porgy and Bess | 5:12 |
| 3. | "Gone" (master) | Porgy and Bess | 3:38 |
| 4. | "Gone, Gone, Gone" (master) | Porgy and Bess | 2:05 |
| 5. | "Summertime" (master) | Porgy and Bess | 3:21 |
| 6. | "Oh Bess, Oh Where's My Bess" (master) | Porgy and Bess | 4:31 |
| 7. | "Prayer (Oh Doctor Jesus)" (master) | Porgy and Bess | 4:42 |
| 8. | "Fisherman, Strawberry, Devil Crab" (master) | Porgy and Bess | 4:11 |
| 9. | "My Man's Gone Now" (master) | Porgy and Bess | 6:16 |
| 10. | "It Ain't Necessarily So" (master) | Porgy and Bess | 4:25 |
| 11. | "Here Come De Honey Man" (master) | Porgy and Bess | 1:20 |
| 12. | "I Loves You, Porgy" (master) | Porgy and Bess | 3:43 |
| 13. | "There's a Boat That's Leaving" (master) | Porgy and Bess | 3:28 |
| 14. | "Gone" (take 3) | Previously unreleased | 3:40 |
| 15. | "Summertime" (take 2) | Previously unreleased | 3:19 |
| 16. | "Prayer (Oh Doctor Jesus)" (take 2) | Previously unreleased | 4:16 |
| 17. | "I Loves You, Porgy" (take 1, second version) | Previously unreleased | 4:17 |
| 18. | "There's a Boat That's Leaving..." (take 2) | Previously unreleased | 3:41 |
| 19. | "Oh Bess, Oh Where's My Bess" (take 5) | Previously unreleased | 4:22 |
| 20. | "Gone" (take 4) | Previously unreleased | 3:40 |
| 21. | "[pause track]" | | 0:06 |

=== Disc 3 – Sketches of Spain ===
| No. | Title | Original Release | Length |
|---|---|---|---|
| 1. | "Concierto de Aranjuez (Adagio)" (master) | Sketches of Spain | 16:19 |
| 2. | "Will o' the Wisp" (master) | Sketches of Spain | 3:47 |
| 3. | "The Pan Piper" (master) | Sketches of Spain | 3:52 |
| 4. | "Saeta" (master) | Sketches of Spain | 5:06 |
| 5. | "Solea" (master) | Sketches of Spain | 12:15 |
| 6. | "Song of Our Country" (issued take) | Directions | 3:23 |
| 7. | "Saeta" (full version of master) | Previously unreleased | 6:01 |
| 8. | "The Pan Piper" (take 1) | Previously unreleased | 3:11 |
| 9. | "Concierto de Aranjuez (Adagio)" (alternate take, part one) | Previously unreleased | 12:04 |
| 10. | "Concierto de Aranjuez (Adagio)" (alternate take, part two) | Previously unreleased | 3:32 |
| 11. | "Song of Our Country" (take 14) | Previously unreleased | 3:10 |
| 12. | "[pause track]" | | 0:06 |

=== Disc 4 – Quiet Nights and More ===
| No. | Title | Original Release | Length |
|---|---|---|---|
| 1. | "Song No. 2" (master) | Quiet Nights | 1:36 |
| 2. | "Once Upon a Summertime" (master) | Quiet Nights | 3:24 |
| 3. | "Aos Pes Da Cruz" (master) | Quiet Nights | 4:15 |
| 4. | "Song No. 1" (master) | Quiet Nights | 4:33 |
| 5. | "Wait Till You See Her" (master) | Quiet Nights | 4:03 |
| 6. | "Corcovado" (master) | Quiet Nights | 2:42 |
| 7. | "Blue Xmas" (master) | Jingle Bell Jazz | 2:40 |
| 8. | "Nothing Like You" (master) | Sorcerer | 1:58 |
| 9. | "Devil May Care" (master) | The Giants of Jazz (various artist compilation) / Basic Miles | 3:27 |
| 10. | "The Time of the Barracudas" | Previously unreleased | 12:45 |
| 11. | "Falling Water" (take 4) | Previously unreleased | 3:34 |
| 12. | "Falling Water" (take 6) | Previously unreleased | 4:22 |
| 13. | "Falling Water" (take 8) | Previously unreleased | 4:15 |
| 14. | "Falling Water" (take 9) | Previously unreleased | 4:18 |
| 15. | "Springsville" (take 5) | Previously unreleased | 3:32 |
| 16. | "The Maids of Cadiz" (take 11) | Previously unreleased | 4:06 |
| 17. | "The Maids of Cadiz" (take 11, insert 1) | Previously unreleased | 2:36 |
| 18. | "Lament" (medley: take 2) | Previously unreleased | 2:35 |
| 19. | "The Duke" (take 1) | Previously unreleased | 3:27 |
| 20. | "I Don't Wanna Be Kissed (By Anyone But You)" (53225 issued version) | Miles Ahead 1993 reissue (catalog no. CK 53225) | 3:07 |

=== Disc 5 – The Making of Miles Ahead ===
| No. | Title | Original Release | Length |
|---|---|---|---|
| 1. | "Springsville" (rehearsal sequence) | Previously unreleased | 6:58 |
| 2. | "Springsville" (rehearsal with piano) | Previously unreleased | 2:30 |
| 3. | "The Maids of Cadiz" (take 9) | Previously unreleased | 0:32 |
| 4. | "The Maids of Cadiz" (take 10) | Previously unreleased | 4:11 |
| 5. | "The Maids of Cadiz" (rehearsal sequence) | Previously unreleased | 1:26 |
| 6. | "Count Off for the Duke" (take 3) | Previously unreleased | 0:35 |
| 7. | "The Duke" (take 8) | Previously unreleased | 3:31 |
| 8. | "The Duke" (piano take 3) | Previously unreleased | 1:52 |
| 9. | "My Ship" (take 6) | Previously unreleased | 4:36 |
| 10. | "Miles Ahead" (rehearsal sequence) | Previously unreleased | 1:47 |
| 11. | "Miles Ahead" (take 12) | Previously unreleased | 3:30 |
| 12. | "Miles Ahead" (take 15) | Previously unreleased | 3:31 |
| 13. | "Studio Discussion" | Previously unreleased | 0:31 |
| 14. | "My Ship" (take 7) | Previously unreleased | 4:39 |
| 15. | "Miles Ahead" (piano insert-mono) | Previously unreleased | 3:06 |
| 16. | "Blues for Pablo" (rehearsal sequence) | Previously unreleased | 5:53 |
| 17. | "New Rhumba" (take 2) | Previously unreleased | 4:38 |
| 18. | "Lament" (take 1) | Previously unreleased | 2:21 |
| 19. | "I Don't Wanna Be Kissed (By Anyone But You)" (rehearsal) | Previously unreleased | 2:10 |
| 20. | "I Don't Wanna Be Kissed (By Anyone But You)" (take 5) | Previously unreleased | 2:57 |
| 21. | "Studio Discussion" | Previously unreleased | 0:33 |
| 22. | "I Don't Wanna Be Kissed (By Anyone But You)" (piano take 4) | Previously unreleased | 2:58 |
| 23. | "[pause track]" | | 0:06 |

=== Disc 6 – Alternate and Rehearsal Takes ===
| No. | Title | Original Release | Length |
|---|---|---|---|
| 1. | "Studio Discussion" | Previously unreleased | 0:19 |
| 2. | "Springsville" (take 8 without overdubs) | Previously unreleased | 3:35 |
| 3. | "Studio Discussion" | Previously unreleased | 0:07 |
| 4. | "Miles Ahead" (take 11 without overdubs) | Previously unreleased | 3:33 |
| 5. | "I Don't Wanna Be Kissed (By Anyone But You)" (take 3 without overdubs) | Previously unreleased | 2:59 |
| 6. | "Springsville" (overdub take 1) | Previously unreleased | 2:08 |
| 7. | "Springsville" (overdubbed solos 4–5) | Previously unreleased | 2:20 |
| 8. | "Springsville" (overdubbed solos 6–9) | Previously unreleased | 2:32 |
| 9. | "Springsville" (issued overdubbed solo) | Previously unreleased | 0:27 |
| 10. | "Miles Ahead" (issued overdubbed solo) | Previously unreleased | 1:54 |
| 11. | "Miles Ahead" (overdubbed solo) | Previously unreleased | 1:35 |
| 12. | "I Don't Wanna Be Kissed (By Anyone But You)" (overdubbed solo 1) | Previously unreleased | 1:04 |
| 13. | "I Don't Wanna Be Kissed (By Anyone But You)" (overdubbed solo 2) | Previously unreleased | 1:26 |
| 14. | "I Don't Wanna Be Kissed (By Anyone But You)" (overdubbed solo 4) | Previously unreleased | 2:04 |
| 15. | "I Don't Wanna Be Kissed (By Anyone But You)" (overdubbed solo 8) | Previously unreleased | 3:05 |
| 16. | "I Don't Wanna Be Kissed (By Anyone But You)" (overdubbed solo 19 & 19C) | Previously unreleased | 2:57 |
| 17. | "Miles Ahead" (mono master) | Previously unreleased | 3:29 |
| 18. | "Gone" (rehearsal sequence) | Previously unreleased | 2:54 |
| 19. | "Gone, Gone, Gone" (rehearsal sequence) | Previously unreleased | 2:57 |
| 20. | "Studio Discussion" | Previously unreleased | 0:53 |
| 21. | "Bess, You Is My Woman Now" (rehearsal take) | Previously unreleased | 4:58 |
| 22. | "It Ain't Necessarily So" (take 1) | Previously unreleased | 3:22 |
| 23. | "Oh Bess, Oh Where's My Bess" (take 3) | Previously unreleased | 3:53 |
| 24. | "I Loves You, Porgy" (rehearsal sequence) | Previously unreleased | 2:19 |
| 25. | "There's a Boat That's Leaving Soon for New York" (remake) | Previously unreleased | 2:24 |
| 26. | "My Man's Gone Now" (remake take) | Previously unreleased | 6:13 |
| 27. | "Song of Our Country" (take 9) | Previously unreleased | 2:59 |
| 28. | "Concierto de Aranjuez (Adagio)" (rehearsal) | Previously unreleased | 7:21 |
| 29. | "Concierto de Aranjuez (Adagio)" (alternate ending) | Previously unreleased | 1:23 |
| 30. | "[pause track]" | | 0:06 |

== Personnel ==
- Miles Davis – trumpet, flugelhorn
- Gil Evans – piano, arranger, conductor
- Bob Dorough (vocals, piano)
- Steve Lacy (soprano saxophone)
- Lee Konitz, Cannonball Adderley (alto saxophone)
- Wayne Shorter (tenor saxophone)
- Ernie Royal, Bernie Glow, James Jorda, John Carisi, Louis Mucci (trumpet)
- Jimmy Cleveland, J.J. Johnson, Frank Rehak, Joe Bennett, Tom Mitchell (trombone)
- Julius Watkins, Gunther Schuller, Willie Ruff, Tony Miranda, Jim Buffington (French horn)
- Bill Barber (tuba)
- Romeo Penque (flute, clarinet, bass clarinet, oboe)
- Hubert Laws (flute)
- Jack Knitzer (bassoon)
- Janet Putnam (harp)
- Wynton Kelly (piano)
- Herbie Hancock (piano, electric piano)
- Joe Beck (electric guitar)
- Paul Chambers, Ron Carter (bass)
- Art Taylor, Philly Joe Jones, Jimmy Cobb, Tony Williams (drums)
- Willie Bobo (bongos)
- Elvin Jones (percussion)
