= Miles from India =

2008 jazz compilation album

Compilation album by Various artists
- Recorded: November 2006 – July 2007
- Label: Times Square Records
- Producer: Bob Belden

Miles from India: A Celebration of the Music of Miles Davis is a compilation album by various artists released in April 2008 through Times Square Records. Produced by Bob Belden, the album features songs associated with iconic trumpeter Miles Davis but performed in new arrangements by American jazz musicians and performers from India. The album reached a peak position of number six on Billboard's Top Jazz Albums chart.

== Track listing ==
Disc 1

1. "Spanish Key" - Gino Banks, Louis Banks, Rakesh Chaurasia, Selva Ganesh, Adam Holzman, Dave Liebman, Shankar Mahadevan, Rudresh Mahanthappa, Sridhar Parthasarthy, Taufiq Qureshi, Benny Rietveld, Wallace Roney, Mike Stern & Lenny White
2. "All Blues" - Louis Banks, Gary Bartz, Ron Carter, Ravi Chary, Jimmy Cobb, Rudresh Mahanthappa & Vikku Vinayakram
3. "Ife (fast)" - Gino Banks, Pete Cosey, Michael Henderson, Adam Holzman, Dave Liebman, Kala Ramnath, A. Sivamani & Vikku Vinayakram
4. "In a Silent Way (Intro)" - Adam Holzman, Robert Irving III & Pandit Brij Narayan
5. "It's About That Time" - Gary Bartz, Ndugu Chancler, Pete Cosey, Michael Henderson, Adam Holzman, Robert Irving III & Kala Ramnath
6. "Jean Pierre" - Ranjit Barot, Rakesh Chaurasia, Adam Holzman, Robert Irving III, Benny Rietveld, Mike Stern & Vince Wilburn Jr.

Disc 2

1. "So What" - Louis Banks, Ron Carter, Ndugu Chancler, Chick Corea, Selva Ganesh, Sridhar Parthasarthy & Taufiq Qureshi
2. "Miles Runs the Voodoo Down" - Pete Cosey, Michael Henderson, Adam Holzman, Wallace Roney, A. Sivamani, Vikku Vinayakram & Lenny White
3. "Blue in Green" - Louis Banks, Ron Carter, Jimmy Cobb, Dilshad Khan, Shankar Mahadevan, Wallace Roney & Mike Stern
4. "Great Expectations (Orange Lady)" - Ravi Chary, Pete Cosey, Michael Henderson, Adam Holzman, Marcus Miller, Taufiq Qureshi, Wallace Roney, Vince Wilburn Jr. & Vikku Vinayakram
5. "Ife (Slow)" - Gary Bartz, Pete Cosey, Michael Henderson, Adam Holzman, Dave Liebman, Wallace Roney & Badal Roy
6. "Miles from India" - Louis Banks, Sikkil Gurucharan, John McLaughlin & U. Srinivas
