= Four & More =

'Four' & More

Live album by Miles Davis
- Released: January 17, 1966
- Recorded: February 12, 1964
- Venues: Philharmonic Hall; New York City
- Genre: Jazz
- Length: 53:53
- Label: Columbia
- Producer: Teo Macero

Miles Davis chronology
Miles in Berlin (1965)	'Four' & More (1966)	Miles Smiles (1967)

Miles Davis live chronology
My Funny Valentine (1964)	Four & More (1964)	Miles in Tokyo (1964)

Professional ratings
Review scores
Source	Rating
Down Beat (Original LP release)	3.5/5 stars
AllMusic	4.5/5 stars
The Rolling Stone Jazz Record Guide	4/5 stars

'Four' & More: Recorded Live in Concert is a live album by Miles Davis. It was recorded at the Philharmonic Hall of Lincoln Center on February 12, 1964, and released two years later. Two albums were assembled from the concert recording: the up-tempo pieces were issued on this album, while My Funny Valentine consists of the slow and medium-tempo numbers.

== Track listing ==
=== Original LP Track listing ===
All tracks are written by Miles Davis, except as noted.

Side one
No.	Title	Writer(s)	Length
1.	"So What"	Miles Davis	9:10
2.	"Walkin'"	Richard Henry Carpenter	8:06
3.	"Joshua/Go-Go (Theme and Announcement)"	Victor Feldman; Miles Davis	11:14

Side two
No.	Title	Writer(s)	Length
1.	"Four"		6:18
2.	"Seven Steps to Heaven"	Feldman; Davis	7:51
3.	"There Is No Greater Love/Go-Go (Theme and Announcement)"	Marty Symes; Isham Jones; Davis	11:23

=== 2005 CD Reissue ===
All tracks are written by Miles Davis, except as noted.

No.	Title	Writer(s)	Length
1.	"So What"		9:10
2.	"Walkin'"	Richard Henry Carpenter	8:07
3.	"Joshua"	Victor Feldman	9:32
4.	"Go-Go (Theme and Announcement)"		1:44
5.	"Four"		6:28
6.	"Seven Steps to Heaven"	Feldman; Davis	7:46
7.	"There Is No Greater Love"	Marty Symes; Isham Jones	10:02
8.	"Go-Go (Theme and Announcement)"		1:21

== Personnel ==
- Miles Davis – trumpet
- George Coleman – tenor saxophone
- Herbie Hancock – piano
- Ron Carter – double bass
- Tony Williams – drums

== Production ==
=== Original LP ===
- Producer — Teo Macero
- Recording Engineer — Fred Plaut
- Cover Photography — Jim Marshall
- Liner Notes — Billy Taylor, Mort Fega

=== Reissue CD (COL 519505 2, 2005) ===
- Reissue Producer — Michael Cuscuna and Bob Belden
- Remixed and Mastered — Mark Wilder at Sony Music Studios, New York, NY.
- Project Director — Seth Rothstein
- Legacy A&R — Steve Berkowitz
- A&R Coordination — Stacey Boyle
- Reissue Art Direction — Howard Fritzson
- Reissue Design — Randall Martin
- Photography — Jim Marshall, Jan Perrson, Francis Wolff, Chuck Stewart, Vernon Smith
- Packaging Manager — John Conroy
- Liner Note — John Ephland
