= Miles in Berlin =

Live album by Miles Davis
- Released: 1965
- Recorded: September 25, 1964
- Venue: Berliner Philharmonie, West Berlin, West Germany
- Genre: Jazz
- Length: 43:44 (LP); 57:23 (CD)
- Label: CBS
- Producer: Rudy Wolpert

Miles Davis chronology
E.S.P. (1965)	Miles in Berlin (1965)	Four & More (1966)

Miles Davis live chronology
Miles in Tokyo (1964)	Miles in Berlin (1964)	The Complete Live at the Plugged Nickel 1965 (1965)

Professional ratings
Review scores
Source	Rating
AllMusic	4.5/5 stars
All About Jazz	(favorable)
The Penguin Guide to Jazz Recordings	3.5/4 stars

Miles in Berlin is a live album by Miles Davis from a performance at the Berliner Philharmonie on September 25, 1964 with his "Second Great Quintet," featuring tenor saxophonist Wayne Shorter, pianist Herbie Hancock, bassist Ron Carter and drummer Tony Williams, marking their first recorded work.

== Track listing ==
=== Original LP ===
All tracks are written by Miles Davis except as noted.

Side one
No.	Title	Writer(s)	Length
1.	"Milestones"		7:56
2.	"Autumn Leaves"	Joseph Kosma; Jacques Prévert; Johnny Mercer	12:46
Total length:			20:42

Side two
No.	Title	Writer(s)	Length
1.	"So What"		10:38
2.	"Walkin'"	Richard Henry Carpenter	10:36
3.	"Theme"		1:48
Total length:			23:02 43:44

=== 2005 CD Reissue ===
All tracks are written by Miles Davis, except as noted.

No.	Title	Writer(s)	Length
1.	"Milestones"		8:57
2.	"Autumn Leaves"	Kosma; Prévert; Mercer	12:37
3.	"So What"		10:27
4.	"Stella by Starlight"	Victor Young; Ned Washington	12:53
5.	"Walkin'"	Carpenter	10:39
6.	"Go-Go (Theme) and Announcement"		1:44
Total length:			57:23

== Personnel ==
- Miles Davis – trumpet
- Wayne Shorter – tenor saxophone
- Herbie Hancock – piano
- Ron Carter – double bass
- Tony Williams – drums

=== Production ===
- Rudy Wolpert – producer, cover photography
  - Recording Produced at SFB Radio, Berlin
- Michael Cuscuna, Bob Belden – reissue producer
- Mark Wilder – remastered by
  - Remastered at Sony Music Studios, New York, NY
