= Joshua (jazz standard) =

Composition by Miles Davis

from the album Seven Steps to Heaven
- Released: 1963
- Recorded: May 14, 1963
- Genre: Jazz
- Length: 6:26
- Label: Columbia
- Composer(s): Victor Feldman, Miles Davis
- Producer(s): Teo Macero

Seven Steps to Heaven track listing
- 6 tracks: 1. "Basin Street Blues"; 2. "Seven Steps to Heaven"; 3. "I Fall in Love Too Easily"; 4. "So Near, So Far"; 5. "Baby Won't You Please Come Home"; 6. "Joshua"

"Joshua" is a 1963 jazz standard composed by the British jazz multi-instrumentalist Victor Feldman and the jazz trumpeter Miles Davis. It was introduced in 1963 by the Miles Davis Quintet.

== Renditions ==
- Miles Davis – Seven Steps to Heaven (1963)
- Miles Davis – Four & More (1964)
- Dick Wellstood – The Seldom Scene (1981)
- Joe Henderson – So Near, So Far (Musings for Miles) (1992)
- Wayne Henderson – Back to the Groove (1992)
- Malachi Thompson – New Standards (1993)
- Alan Dawson – Waltzin' with Flo (2002)
- SFJAZZ Collective – Music of Miles Davis & Original Compositions (Live: SF JAZZ Center 2016) (2017)
