= Forecast: Tomorrow =

Compilation album by Weather Report
- Released: September 19, 2006
- Recorded: 1969–1985
- Genre: Jazz fusion
- Length: Total: 223:37; Disc One: 78:38; Disc Two: 68:51; Disc Three: 76:08
- Label: Columbia
- Producer: Bob Belden, Joe Zawinul, Wayne Shorter

Weather Report chronology
Live and Unreleased (2002)	Forecast: Tomorrow (2006)	The Legendary Live Tapes: 1978–1981 (2015)

Professional ratings
Review scores
Source	Rating
Allmusic	4.5/5 stars

Forecast: Tomorrow is a 3-CD/1-DVD career-spanning compilation of recordings of Weather Report. The 37 tracks are presented chronologically, beginning with three tracks pre-Weather Report, from ensemble duties with Miles Davis (both Zawinul and Shorter), Cannonball Adderley (Zawinul), and from a Shorter solo album. In addition to two previously unreleased tracks, the set closes with DJ Logic's remix of "125th Street Congress".

The 4th disc in the package is a 2-hour DVD of a concert in Offenbach am Main, on September 28, 1978 for the German TV program Rockpalast. The boxed set includes a 100-page book with notes on the set by compiler Bob Belden, a long essay on the band by Hal Miller, and a reminiscence of the 1978 concert by drummer Peter Erskine.

== CD Track listing ==
Disc One
Track Title	Composer	Track Length	Year Recorded	Original Release
"In a Silent Way"	Joe Zawinul	4:17	1969	In a Silent Way, Miles Davis
"Super Nova"	Wayne Shorter	4:48	1969	Super Nova, Wayne Shorter
"Experience in E Major" (Excerpt)	Joe Zawinul	5:42	1970	The Cannonball Adderley Quintet & Orchestra, Cannonball Adderley
"Milky Way"	Wayne Shorter, Joe Zawinul	2:31	1971	Weather Report
"Tears"	Wayne Shorter	3:23	1971	Weather Report
"Eurydice" (Full Version)	Wayne Shorter	10:44	1971	Weather Report
"Orange Lady"	Joe Zawinul	8:42	1971	Weather Report
"Unknown Soldier"	Joe Zawinul	7:58	1971	I Sing the Body Electric
"Directions" (Take 1, Studio Version)	Joe Zawinul	5:29	1971	Previously Unreleased
"Surucucu"	Wayne Shorter	8:19	1972	Live in Tokyo, I Sing the Body Electric
"Second Sunday in August"	Joe Zawinul	4:12	1972	I Sing the Body Electric
"125th Street Congress"	Joe Zawinul	12:14	1973	Sweetnighter
Disc Two
Track Title	Composer	Track Length	Year Recorded	Original Release
"Nubian Sundance" (Live)	Joe Zawinul	13:05	1974	Previously Unreleased
"Blackthorn Rose"	Wayne Shorter	5:01	1974	Mysterious Traveller
"Badia"	Joe Zawinul	5:21	1975	Tale Spinnin'
"Cannon Ball"	Joe Zawinul	4:38	1976	Black Market
"Black Market"	Joe Zawinul	6:33	1976	Black Market
"Three Clowns"	Wayne Shorter	3:24	1976	Black Market
"Havona"	Jaco Pastorius	6:01	1976	Heavy Weather
"Birdland"	Joe Zawinul	5:58	1976	Heavy Weather
"Palladíum"	Wayne Shorter	4:47	1976	Heavy Weather
"The Pursuit of the Woman With the Feathered Hat"	Joe Zawinul	5:03	1978	Mr. Gone
"The Orphan"	Wayne Shorter, Joe Zawinul	3:17	1979	8:30
"Sightseeing"	Wayne Shorter	5:35	1979	8:30
Disc Three
Track Title	Composer	Track Length	Year Recorded	Original Release
"Dream Clock"	Joe Zawinul	6:28	1980	Night Passage
"Three Views of a Secret"	Jaco Pastorius	5:53	1980	Night Passage
"Port of Entry" (Live)	Wayne Shorter	5:08	1980	Night Passage
"Dara Factor Two"	Joe Zawinul, Wayne Shorter, Jaco Pastorius. Peter Erskine, Robert Thomas	4:27	1981	Weather Report (1982)
"Procession"	Joe Zawinul	8:42	1982	Procession
"Plaza Real"	Wayne Shorter	5:28	1982	Procession
"The Well"	Wayne Shorter	3:57	1982	Procession
"D-Flat Waltz"	Joe Zawinul	11:12	1984	Domino Theory
"Domino Theory"	Joe Zawinul	6:10	1984	Domino Theory
"Predator"	Wayne Shorter	5:20	1984	Domino Theory
"Face on the Barroom Floor"	Wayne Shorter	3:58	1985	Sportin' Life
"Indiscretions"	Joe Zawinul	4:06	1985	Sportin' Life
"125th Street Congress (DJ Logic Remix)"	Joe Zawinul	5:04	1973/2005	First Release

== Personnel for the Offenbach Concert ==
- Joe Zawinul - keyboards
- Wayne Shorter - saxophones
- Jaco Pastorius - bass
- Peter Erskine - drums

== DVD Track listing ==
1. "Black Market" (Zawinul)
2. "Scarlet Woman" (Johnson/Zawinul/Shorter)
3. "Young and Fine" (Zawinul)
4. "The Pursuit of the Woman With the Feathered Hat" (Zawinul)
5. "A Remark You Made" (Zawinul)
6. "River People" (Pastorius)
7. "Thanks for the Memories" (Rainger/Robin)
8. "Delores/Portrait of Tracy/Third Stone from the Sun" (Shorter)/(Pastorius)/(Hendrix)
9. "Mr. Gone" (Zawinul)
10. "In a Silent Way" (Zawinul)
11. "Waterfall" (Zawinul)
12. "Teen Town" (Pastorius)
13. "I Got It Bad and That Ain't Good/The Midnight Sun Will Never Set on You" (Ellington/Webster)/(Burke/Hampton/Mercer)
14. "Birdland" (Zawinul)
15. "Introductions"
16. "Fred & Jack" (Erskine)
17. "Elegant People" (Shorter)
18. "Badia" (Zawinul)
