= Miles Davis at Carnegie Hall =

Live album by Miles Davis
- Released: July 16, 1962
- Recorded: May 19, 1961
- Venues: Carnegie Hall; New York City
- Genres: Jazz; hard bop
- Length: 44:54
- Label: Columbia
- Producer: Teo Macero

Miles Davis chronology
| In Person Saturday Night at the Blackhawk, San Francisco, Volume 2 (1961) | Miles Davis at Carnegie Hall (1962) | Seven Steps to Heaven (1963) |

Miles Davis live chronology
| In Person Friday and Saturday Nights at the Blackhawk, Complete (1961) | Miles Davis at Carnegie Hall (1961) | Miles Davis in Europe (1963) |

Professional ratings
Review scores
| Source | Rating |
|---|---|
| Down Beat (Original LP release) | 4/5 stars |
| AllMusic | 4/5 stars |
| The Penguin Guide to Jazz Recordings | 3.5/4 stars |

Miles Davis at Carnegie Hall: The Legendary Performances of May 19, 1961 is a live album by American jazz musician Miles Davis originally released by Columbia in 1962. It was nominated for the Grammy Award for Best Jazz Performance – Large Group (Instrumental). In 1987, a follow up with more recordings from the concert was released as Live Miles: More Music from the Legendary Carnegie Hall Concert, and the two were combined into a double-album in 1998.

== Background ==
This live performance features Davis with his regular quintet and accompanied by Gil Evans and his 21-piece orchestra. The orchestra and quintet together perform selections from Miles Ahead and Sketches of Spain, while the quintet by itself performs both Davis originals and standards by Sonny Rollins and Ahmad Jamal, among others.

Although Davis and Evans recorded multiple albums together, there were only two live performances ever with both quintet and orchestra. On top of the rarity of the occasion, the Carnegie Hall recording features a few one-offs: the only recordings of the Gil Evans-orchestrated introduction to "So What" and a version of "Spring Is Here," again arranged by Evans.

== Track listing ==
=== Original release ===
The original LP was released in two versions: as CL 1812 in monaural and CS 8612 as "electronically re-channeled for stereo."

All tracks are written by Miles Davis, except as noted.

| No. | Title | Writer(s) | Length |
|---|---|---|---|
| 1. | "So What" | | 12:04 |
| 2. | "Spring Is Here" | Lorenz Hart; Richard Rodgers | 3:58 |
| 3. | "No Blues" | | 10:55 |
| 4. | "Oleo" | Sonny Rollins | 7:23 |
| 5. | "Someday My Prince Will Come" | Frank Churchill; Larry Morey | 2:43 |
| 6. | "The Meaning of the Blues / Lament / New Rhumba" | Bobby Troup/Leah Worth; J.J. Johnson; Ahmad Jamal | 8:31 |

=== 1998 Columbia/Legacy release ===
A two-disc CD version of the complete concert in chronological order was released by Sony/Columbia in 1998. This edition features the original mono mix.

Disc 1

| No. | Title | Writer(s) | Length |
|---|---|---|---|
| 1. | "So What" | Davis | 12:01 |
| 2. | "Spring Is Here" | Rodgers, Hart | 3:58 |
| 3. | "Teo" | Davis | 9:10 |
| 4. | "Walkin'" | Richard Carpenter | 9:32 |
| 5. | "The Meaning Of The Blues / Lament" | Troup, Worth / Johnson | 4:34 |
| 6. | "New Rhumba" | Jamal | 4:07 |

Disc 2

| No. | Title | Writer(s) | Length |
|---|---|---|---|
| 1. | "Someday My Prince Will Come" | Churchill, Morey | 2:55 |
| 2. | "Oleo" | Rollins | 7:19 |
| 3. | "No Blues" | Davis | 10:38 |
| 4. | "I Thought About You" | Jimmy Van Heusen, Johnny Mercer | 5:00 |
| 5. | "En Aranjuez Con Tu Amor (adagio from Concierto de Aranjuez)" | Joaquín Rodrigo | 17:05 |

== Personnel ==
=== The Miles Davis Quintet ===
- Miles Davis – trumpet
- Hank Mobley – tenor saxophone
- Wynton Kelly – piano
- Paul Chambers – bass
- Jimmy Cobb – drums

The Gil Evans Orchestra

- Gil Evans – arranger and conductor
- Miles Davis – trumpet soloist
- Ernie Royal, Bernie Glow, Johnny Coles, Louis Mucci – trumpets
- Jimmy Knepper, Dick Hixon, Frank Rehak – trombones
- Julius Watkins, Paul Ingrahan, Bob Swisshelm – French horns
- Bill Barber – tuba
- Romeo Penque, Jerome Richardson, Eddie Caine, Bob Tricarico, Danny Bank – reeds and woodwinds
- Janet Putnam – harp
- Wynton Kelly – piano (on "Spring is Here" only)
- Paul Chambers – bass
- Jimmy Cobb – drums
- Bobby Rosengarden – percussion

Production

- Teo Macero – producer

== Chart history ==
| Chart | Peak position |
|---|---|
| US Billboard Top Jazz Albums | 59 |
