= Amsterdam Concert =

Live album by Miles Davis
- Released: 2005
- Recorded: December 8, 1957
- Venue: Concertgebouw, Amsterdam
- Genre: Jazz
- Length: 58:53
- Label: Lone Hill Jazz

Miles Davis chronology
Birdland 1951 (2004)	Amsterdam Concert (2005)	Live at the 1963 Monterey Jazz Festival (2007)

Amsterdam Concert is a rare live Miles Davis recording from 1957. This album was recorded at the Concertgebouw in Amsterdam on December 8, 1957, a couple of days after the recording of the movie soundtrack Ascenseur pour l'échafaud. Davis recorded the album with drummer Kenny Clarke and three French musicians: Pierre Michelot on bass, Rene Urtreger on piano, and Barney Wilen on tenor saxophone.

== Reception ==
Professional ratings
Review scores
Source	Rating
AllMusic	2.5/5 stars
The Guardian	3/5 stars
The Penguin Guide to Jazz Recordings	3/4 stars

In a review for AllMusic, Scott Yanow wrote: "this hard-to-find set is recommended for the rare opportunity to hear Miles Davis stretching out with these musicians."

Writing for The Guardian, John Fordham called the album "a real rarity," and commented: "The upshot is that Davis's one-off relationship with the Club St Germain's house rhythm section for the Malle project... doesn't sound quite as compatible as it did for the soundtrack, where the need to swing was reduced - but it's still a fascinating document."

== Track listing ==
1. "Woody 'n' You" (Dizzy Gillespie) - 5:07
2. "Bags' Groove" (Milt Jackson) - 7:17
3. "What's New" (Bob Haggart) - 3:41
4. "But Not for Me" (George Gershwin) - 6:52
5. "A Night in Tunisia" (Gillespie) - 7:30
6. "Four" (Miles Davis) - 4:33
7. "Walkin'" (Richard Carpenter) - 6:48
8. "Well You Needn't" (Thelonious Monk) - 5:36
9. "'Round About Midnight" (Monk) - 5:37
10. "Lady Bird" (Tadd Dameron) - 5:50

== Personnel ==
- Miles Davis – trumpet
- Barney Wilen – tenor saxophone
- René Urtreger – piano
- Pierre Michelot – bass
- Kenny Clarke – drums
