= Birdland 1951 =

Live album by Miles Davis
- Released: January 27, 2004
- Recorded: February 17, 1951 – September 29, 1951
- Venue: Birdland; New York City
- Genre: Jazz; bop
- Length: 65:35
- Label: Blue Note
- Producer: Michael Cuscuna

Miles Davis chronology
Live at the Fillmore East, March 7, 1970: It's About that Time (2001)	Birdland 1951 (2004)	Amsterdam Concert (2005)

Miles Davis live chronology
In Paris: Festival International de Jazz May, 1949 (1949)	Birdland 1951 (1951)	Miles Davis at Newport 1955–1975: The Bootleg Series Vol. 4 (1955)

Professional ratings
Review scores
Source	Rating
Allmusic	Allmusic link

Birdland 1951 is a live album by American jazz musician Miles Davis, released on January 27, 2004, by Blue Note Records and recorded from February 17, 1951, through September 29, 1951, in Birdland, from radio broadcasts. Three different broadcasts were chosen: two comprising six cuts in total were from June and September and have been issued in various forms on bootlegs over the decades. Four cuts were taken from a broadcast on February 17, which have never been available in any form.

== Track listing ==
All tracks are written by Miles Davis, except as noted.

No.	Title	Writer(s)	Date recorded	Length
1.	"Move"	Denzil Best	June 2, 1951	6:13
2.	"Half Nelson"		June 2, 1951	7:34
3.	"Down"		June 2, 1951	7:14
4.	"Out of the Blue"		February 17, 1951	5:54
5.	"Half Nelson"		February 17, 1951	7:42
6.	"Tempus Fugue-it"	Bud Powell	February 17, 1951	6:44
7.	"Move"	Best	February 17, 1951	5:44
8.	"Move"	Best	September 29, 1951	6:22
9.	"The Squirrel"	Tadd Dameron	September 29, 1951	8:38
10.	"Lady Bird"	Dameron	September 29, 1951	5:30

== Personnel ==
=== February 17 & June 2, 1951 ===
- Miles Davis – trumpet
- J.J. Johnson – trombone
- Sonny Rollins – tenor saxophone
- Kenny Drew – piano
- Tommy Potter – double bass
- Art Blakey – drums

=== September 29, 1951 ===
- Miles Davis – trumpet
- Eddie "Lockjaw" Davis – tenor saxophone
- Big Nick Nicholas – tenor saxophone
- Billy Taylor – piano
- Charles Mingus – double bass
- Art Blakey – drums

=== Production ===
- Malcolm Addey – disc transfer
- Michael Cuscuna – producer
- Kurt Lundvall – mastering, restoration
- Ken Robertson – digital restoration
- Francis Wolff – photographer
- Burton Yount – art director, cover design
