= All Blues =

1959 composition by Miles Davis

Composition by Miles Davis

from the album Kind of Blue
- Released: August 17, 1959
- Recorded: April 22, 1959
- Genre: Modal jazz
- Length: 11:33
- Label: Columbia
- Composer: Miles Davis
- Producer: Irving Townsend

"All Blues" is a jazz composition by Miles Davis that first appeared on the influential 1959 album Kind of Blue. In the original liner notes, pianist Bill Evans describes the piece as "a 6/8 12-measure blues form that produces its mood through only a few modal changes and Miles Davis' free melodic conception."

== Background ==
Davis told jazz critic Ralph Gleason that "All Blues" originated as a live number, evolving over six months and benefitting from "a workover by Gil Evans." Bill Evans recalled that at the Kind of Blue session, nothing was written out for "All Blues", as was also the case for "Freddie Freeloader" and "So What". In addition, the piece didn't yet have an official title and was referred to in the session notes as "African". Although it opens side B of the LP, it was the last piece recorded for the album.

On the original 50,000 copies of the first pressing of the album, though, the names of the pieces on the B side were reversed, given in the order they were recorded rather than in the order on the actual record, so "All Blues" was identified as "Flamenco Sketches" and vice versa, creating long-persisting confusion among fans as to which was which.

== Original recording ==
Take 1 broke down quickly because of a late entrance by bassist Paul Chambers. Take 2 is the only complete take. Evans noted that the tremolo effect he creates at the beginning was "just something I threw in." After the 10-second intro, the saxophones play the recurrent vamp and then Davis enters, playing the main melodic line, accompanied by drummer Jimmy Cobb on brushes. Davis takes the first solo as Cobb switches to drumsticks. Then the established order from earlier tracks changes, as alto saxophonist Cannonball Adderley comes second, followed by tenor saxophonist John Coltrane. Evans, who has been extensively comping during the other solos and playing the vamp between solos, comes last, playing a sequence of fourths and mostly on the white keys. The band returns to the main theme, and Davis delays the ending by playing another extemporized passage that echoes his main solo. Throughout the entire 11½-minute piece (the longest track on the album), Chambers plays an incessant ostinato figure. At the end on the session tape, he can be heard panting and saying, "Damn that's a hard mother!" This was the last time Davis and Evans ever recorded together.

== Personnel ==
- Miles Davis – trumpet
- Julian "Cannonball" Adderley – alto saxophone
- John Coltrane – tenor saxophone
- Bill Evans – piano
- Paul Chambers – double bass
- Jimmy Cobb – drums

== Analysis ==
"All Blues" is a twelve-bar blues in 6/8; the chord sequence is that of a basic blues and made up entirely of seventh chords, with a ♭VI in the turnaround instead of just the usual V chord. In the composition's original key of G, this chord is an E♭7. The Mixolydian mode of the song launched the fad for modal jazz.

A particularly distinctive feature of "All Blues" is the bass line that repeats through the whole piece, except when a V or ♭VI chord is reached (the 9th and 10th bars of a chorus). Furthermore, there is a harmonically similar vamp that is played by the horns (the two saxophones in the case of Kind of Blue) at the beginning and then (usually) continued by the piano under the solos. Each chorus is usually separated by a four-bar vamp, which acts as an introduction to the next solo/chorus.

In his solo, Davis plays many altered ninths, whereas Coltrane relies heavily on his characteristic use of chromatic cells of notes. While comping, Evans typically omits fifths, voicing his chords with thirds, sevenths, and ninths.

== Notable later recordings ==
"All Blues" has subsequently been recorded more than 400 times. Davis himself recorded a much faster live version in 1964 on the album My Funny Valentine: Miles Davis in Concert. Some other notable recordings include:

- Mary Lou Williams, Live at the Cookery (1975)
- The Great Jazz Trio (Hank Jones, piano; Ron Carter, bass; Tony Williams, drums), Kindness Joy Love & Happiness (1977)
- Freddie Hubbard & Oscar Peterson, Face to Face (1982)
- World Saxophone Quartet, Selim Sivad: A Tribute to Miles Davis (1998)
- Roland Hanna, Everything I Love (2002)
- Gary Bartz et al., Miles from India (2007) [played in 5/4 with sitar and ghatam]
- Chick Corea, Trilogy 2 (2018) – Corea's recording was posthumously honored with the Grammy Award for Best Improvised Jazz Solo at the 63rd GRAMMY Awards in 2021.

== Legacy ==
Oscar Brown Jr. added lyrics to his 1963 recording of "All Blues" on the album Tell It Like It Is! Various singers have subsequently recorded Brown's version, including Dee Dee Bridgewater (1987), Mark Murphy (1990, released 2004), Ernestine Anderson (1996), and Ann Hampton Callaway (1997).

In 1970, guitarist Dickey Betts composed an instrumental for The Allman Brothers Band titled "In Memory of Elizabeth Reed", which is based on "All Blues". The most acclaimed recording of it appears on the live album At Fillmore East, which features a famous guitar solo by Duane Allman, who said, "that kind of playing comes from Miles and Coltrane, and particularly Kind of Blue. I've listened to that album so many times that for the past couple of years, I haven't hardly listened to anything else."

In the 1993 film In the Line of Fire, Clint Eastwood's character, Secret Service Agent Frank Horrigan, listens to "All Blues" during a pensive moment.
