= My Funny Valentine: Miles Davis in Concert =

My Funny Valentine

Live album by Miles Davis
- Released: February 23, 1965
- Recorded: February 12, 1964
- Venue: Philharmonic Hall, NYC
- Genre: Jazz
- Length: 63:12
- Label: Columbia
- Producer: Teo Macero

Miles Davis chronology
| Miles in Europe (1964) | My Funny Valentine (1965) | E.S.P. (1965) |

Miles Davis live chronology
| Live at the 1963 Monterey Jazz Festival (1963) | My Funny Valentine (1964) | Four & More (1964) |

Professional ratings
Review scores
| Source | Rating |
|---|---|
| AllMusic | 4.5/5 stars |
| DownBeat | 4.5/5 stars |
| The Penguin Guide to Jazz Recordings | 3.5/4 stars |

My Funny Valentine: Miles Davis in Concert is a live album by the jazz trumpeter and composer Miles Davis. It was recorded at a concert at the Philharmonic Hall of Lincoln Center, New York City, on February 12, 1964, and released through Columbia Records the following year.

== Background ==
The concert was part of a series of benefits staged at the recently built Philharmonic Hall (now known as David Geffen Hall), co-sponsored by the NAACP, the Congress of Racial Equality and the Student Nonviolent Coordinating Committee. Davis's set that night was ostensibly in support of voter registration in Mississippi and Louisiana, but he also mentioned in a Melody Maker interview that one of the concerts was in memory of John F. Kennedy, who had been assassinated the previous year. Kennedy's death had struck at the hopes of many in the Civil Rights Movement, a cause dear to Miles, who had expressed his admiration for the President in 1962: "I like the Kennedy brothers; they're swinging people."

Two albums were assembled from the concert recording. The up-tempo pieces were issued as Four & More, while My Funny Valentine consists of the slow and medium-tempo numbers. Davis biographer Ian Carr notes that the former were "taken too fast and played scrappily", while the Funny Valentine pieces "were played with more depth and brilliance than Miles had achieved before." He goes on to laud the album as "one of the very greatest recordings of a live concert … The playing throughout the album is inspired, and Miles in particular reaches tremendous heights. Anyone who wanted to get a vivid idea of the trumpeter's development over the previous eight years or so should compare [earlier recordings of "My Funny Valentine" and "Stella by Starlight"] with the versions on this 1964 live recording."

The hurried nature of the faster pieces that night has been partially attributed to the sheer importance of the event weighing on Davis's young rhythm section, who were playing their biggest date yet. Tensions were only worsened by their anger on finding out they would not be paid for the performance. Pianist Herbie Hancock, twenty-three years old at the time, later described the psychological pressure on the quintet:

"That was my first time playing at the Philharmonic Hall and that was, like, a big deal, because the new Carnegie Hall was the Philharmonic Hall. Just from the prestige standpoint I really wanted to play good—the whole band really wanted to play good because that was the whole band's first time playing there … although Miles had played at Carnegie Hall before … but it was really a special concert. Only the New York Philharmonic plays there … and I tell you something … it was really funny … when we walked away from that concert, we were all dejected and disappointed. We thought we had really bombed … but then we listened to the record - it sounded fantastic!"

The concert marked the final recording of saxophonist George Coleman with Miles Davis. He would be replaced by Sam Rivers, then Wayne Shorter, cementing Miles' "Second Great Quintet."

== Track listing ==
Side 1
| No. | Title | Writer(s) | Length |
|---|---|---|---|
| 1. | "My Funny Valentine" | Richard Rodgers; Lorenz Hart | 15:03 |
| 2. | "All of You" | Cole Porter | 14:57 |
| Total length: | | | 30:00 |

Side 2
| No. | Title | Writer(s) | Length |
|---|---|---|---|
| 1. | "Stella by Starlight" | Ned Washington; Victor Young | 13:01 |
| 2. | "All Blues" | Miles Davis | 8:57 |
| 3. | "I Thought About You" | Johnny Mercer; Jimmy van Heusen | 11:14 |
| Total length: | | | 33:12 1:03:12 |

== Personnel ==
=== The Miles Davis Quintet ===
- Miles Davis – trumpet
- George Coleman – tenor saxophone
- Herbie Hancock – piano
- Ron Carter – double bass
- Tony Williams – drums

=== Technical personnel ===
- Teo Macero – producer
- Fred Plaut – recording engineer
- Giorgio Molinari – photography
- Nat Hentoff – liner notes

==== Reissue personnel ====
- Michael Cuscuna, Bob Belden – producer
- Mark Wilder – mixing, mastering
  - at Sony Music Studios, New York, NY.
- Randall Martin – design
- Giorgio Molinari, Francis Wolff, Chuck Stewart, Vernon Smith – photography
- Ron Carter – liner notes

== Sources ==
- Carr, Ian (1998). Miles Davis: The Definitive Biography (Revised ed.). HarperCollins. ISBN 0-00-653026-5.
