= E.S.P. (Miles Davis album) =

Studio album by Miles Davis
- Released: August 16, 1965
- Recorded: January 20–22, 1965
- Studios: Columbia Studios, Hollywood
- Genres: Jazz; hard bop; post-bop; modal jazz
- Length: 48:05
- Label: Columbia
- Producer: Irving Townsend

Miles Davis chronology
My Funny Valentine (1965)	E.S.P. (1965)	Miles in Berlin (1965)

E.S.P. is an album by Miles Davis, recorded on January 20–22, 1965 and released on August 16 of that year by Columbia Records. It is the first release from what is known as Davis's second great quintet: Davis on trumpet, Wayne Shorter on tenor saxophone, Herbie Hancock on piano, Ron Carter on bass, and Tony Williams on drums. The album was named after a tune by Shorter, and was inspired by the fact that "since Wayne Shorter's arrival, the five members of the quintet seemed to communicate by mental telepathy."

== Background ==
The album represented a departure from Davis's previous recordings in that it does not include any ballads or standards. Davis contributed one composition ("Agitation", which the quintet would often play live, as they did at the Plugged Nickel dates later that year), and co-wrote two pieces with Carter ("Eighty-One" and "Mood"). Carter also contributed "R.J.", while Hancock was represented by "Little One", which would appear on his album Maiden Voyage, recorded roughly two months later. Shorter, having been told to "bring the book" (referring to his growing book of original compositions), is credited for the title track and "Iris". Originally, the rights to the title track were shared between Davis and Shorter, but Davis returned all the rights in later years.

A number of the pieces on the album challenge standard 32-measure forms: "Mood", for example, has a 13-bar form, while "R.J." is 19 bars in length. All of the pieces were either modified by Davis or collectively reworked by the group at the session. Hancock recalled how Davis approached "Eighty-One": "Miles took the first two bars of melody notes and squished them together, and he took out other areas to leave a big space that only the rhythm section would play. To me, it sounded like getting to the essence of the composition. He'd take the inherent structure and leave us room to breathe and create something fresh every night. There were the basic elements of the song, but not used exactly as they were in the composition."

E.S.P. was recorded at Columbia's Hollywood Studios following a falling-out between Davis and Teo Macero after the release of Quiet Nights. It was the last album bearing a photo of Davis's then-wife Frances on the cover, as the couple would separate by the end of 1965 as a result of Davis's erratic and violent behaviour.

== Reception ==
Professional ratings
Review scores
Source	Rating
AllMusic	4.5/5 stars
DownBeat	4.5/5 stars
The Encyclopedia of Popular Music	4/5 stars
The Penguin Guide to Jazz Recordings	4/4 stars
Record Mirror	4/5 stars
The Rolling Stone Jazz Record Guide	5/5 stars

Kenny Dorham reviewed the album in the December 1965 issue of DownBeat, awarding it 4.5 out of 5 stars, but commented: "Emotionally, as a whole, this one is lacking. It's mostly brain music... This type of music has that drone thing that I don't like, but because of the almost flawless presentation, I give five stars—but only four stars for the writing and effort—and no stars for the over-all sound. E.S.P. music in general is monotonous—one long drone."

Recent commentators have been more positive overall. Stanley Crouch wrote: "the music still sounds fresh. The trumpeter was in superb form, able to execute quickstep swing at fleet tempi with volatile penetration, to put the weight of his sound on mood pieces, to rear his way up through the blues with a fusion of bittersweet joy and what Martin Williams termed 'communal anguish.' The rhythm section played with a looseness that pivots off Williams's cymbal splashes and unclinched rhythms, Carter walking some of the most impressive bass lines of the day, and Hancock developing his own version of the impressionism that Evans was making popular." Davis biographer John Szwed wrote: "The mixture of the abstract and the earthy that Davis had so often seemed to be reaching for began to take shape with this record. Wayne Shorter's ease with indeterminate melodies and his eagerness to join the rhythm section in churning up the music to the point that it threatened to break loose from the traditions of jazz gave Davis the space he needed to reexamine his own playing."

In a review for AllMusic, Stephen Thomas Erlewine commented: "ESP marks the beginning of a revitalization for Miles Davis, as his second classic quintet... gels, establishing what would become their signature adventurous hard bop. Miles had been moving toward this direction in the two years preceding the release of ESP and he had recorded with everyone outside of Shorter prior to this record, but his addition galvanizes the group, pushing them toward music that was recognizably bop but as adventurous as jazz's avant-garde. Outwardly, this music doesn't take as many risks as Coltrane or Ornette Coleman's recordings of the mid-'60s, but by borrowing some of the same theories -- a de-emphasis of composition in favor of sheer improvisation, elastic definitions of tonality -- they created a unique sound that came to define the very sound of modern jazz... The compositions are brilliantly structured as well, encouraging such free-form exploration with their elliptical yet memorable themes. This quintet may have cut more adventurous records, but ESP remains one of their very best albums."

Brian Morton noted: "E.S.P. is... the first record on which Miles seems to be flirting with rock. 'Eighty-One' has a strong backbeat, and the kind of regular, repetitive bass line and percussion that was characteristic of funk, and still considered somewhat infra dig in jazz. Any suggestion that Miles only began to explore a rock idiom on 1970's Bitches Brew misses the mark by a good four years."

== Track listing ==
Columbia – CS 9150

Side one
No.	Title	Writer(s)	Recording session	Length
1.	"E.S.P."	Wayne Shorter	January 20, 1965	5:27
2.	"Eighty-One"	Ron Carter, Miles Davis	January 21, 1965	6:11
3.	"Little One"	Herbie Hancock	January 21, 1965	7:21
4.	"R.J."	Ron Carter	January 20, 1965	3:56

Side two
No.	Title	Writer(s)	Recording session	Length
1.	"Agitation"	Miles Davis	January 22, 1965	7:46
2.	"Iris"	Wayne Shorter	January 22, 1965	8:29
3.	"Mood"	Ron Carter, Miles Davis	January 22, 1965	8:50
Total length:				48:05

== Personnel ==
- Miles Davis – trumpet
- Wayne Shorter – tenor saxophone
- Herbie Hancock – piano
- Ron Carter – bass
- Tony Williams – drums

Technical

- Irving Townsend – producer
- Harold Chapman - Recording Engineer
- Bob Cato – cover photography
