= Seven Steps to Heaven (composition) =

1963 jazz composition by Miles Davis

Composition by Miles Davis

from the album Seven Steps to Heaven
- Released: 1963
- Recorded: May 14, 1963
- Genre: Jazz
- Length: 6:26
- Label: Columbia
- Composers: Victor Feldman, Miles Davis
- Producer: Teo Macero

Seven Steps to Heaven track listing
- 6 tracks: 1. "Basin Street Blues"; 2. "Seven Steps to Heaven"; 3. "I Fall in Love Too Easily"; 4. "So Near, So Far"; 5. "Baby Won't You Please Come Home"; 6. "Joshua"

"Seven Steps to Heaven" is a 1963 jazz composition by Victor Feldman and Miles Davis. Different lyrics to it were written much later by Cassandra Wilson and Jon Hendricks. This iconic jazz standard was introduced in 1963 by the Miles Davis Quintet. Although Feldman played and recorded with Davis in Los Angeles on Seven Steps to Heaven, and he appears on half of the tracks of the album, the West Coast-based pianist did not want to follow Davis to New York, where the album version of the composition was finally recorded with Herbie Hancock on piano.

== Composition ==
Seven Steps to Heaven is a 32-bar composition in AABA form; it has an intro, an interlude and an ending - but these are the same. It was originally played in an up-tempo swing style in the key of F Major.

== See also ==
- List of post-1950 jazz standards
