= Quiet Nights (Miles Davis album) =

Studio album by Miles Davis
- Released: December 16, 1963
- Recorded: July 27, 1962–April 17, 1963
- Studios: Columbia 30th Street Studio, New York City; CBS Columbia Square, Hollywood
- Genres: Jazz; third stream; bossa nova
- Length: 26:57
- Label: Columbia
- Producer: Teo Macero

Miles Davis chronology
Seven Steps to Heaven (1963)	Quiet Nights (1963)	Miles & Monk at Newport (1964)

Quiet Nights is a studio album by American jazz musician Miles Davis, released on December 16, 1963, by Columbia Records. Recorded mostly at Columbia's 30th Street Studio in Manhattan, it marked Davis's fourth and final collaboration with arranger and conductor Gil Evans.

== Background ==
Keeping to his standard procedure at Columbia to date of alternating small group records and big band studio projects with Gil Evans, Davis entered the studio with Evans to follow up the latest studio LP by the working quintet, Someday My Prince Will Come. In 1961, Davis had also released his first live albums: the separate but related Friday Night at the Blackhawk and Saturday Night at the Blackhawk, recorded back-to-back—in addition to the studio set. Miles Davis at Carnegie Hall, another 1961 live set with both the quintet and a large ensemble conducted by Evans, was issued in 1962.

The genesis of this Davis/Evans album, however, encountered far greater difficulties than its three predecessors. Bossa nova had recently become a commercial success with Stan Getz's 1962 single "Desafinado", and Columbia executives may have pressured Davis and Evans to attempt something similar with this album. Sessions were also protracted over long stretches of time.

== Recording ==
The first session took place at Columbia 30th Street Studio on July 27, 1962, and produced the songs "Corcovado" and "Aos pés da cruz" (Portuguese: "At the Foot of the Cross"), both of which were released as singles that failed to chart. Davis and Evans returned to longer forms for three further sessions that took place from August 13 to November 6, 1962, Evans perhaps not given enough time to finish the charts for the first session. The attempt to mix potential hit singles and Evans' writing style for Davis, essentially concertos for jazz trumpeter, may have torpedoed the project.

The result of the sessions was approximately 20 minutes of usable music, enough for an album side but not an entire album. Evans and Davis never made it back into the studio to complete more recordings, and the project was shelved. Faced with the expenses from the large ensemble and the studio time, producer Teo Macero added "Summer Night", a quartet track from a CBS Columbia Square session on April 17, 1963, to complete the album and give the label something to show for its investment. Davis was furious at the release of what he saw as an unfinished project, and did not work with Macero again until the October 1966 sessions for Miles Smiles. "Summer Night" was originally an outtake by Davis' group as recorded for the album Seven Steps to Heaven.

"The Time of the Barracudas", recorded in Hollywood on October 9 and 10, 1963, was written as a commission from Peter Barnes to accompany a production of his play of the same name starring Laurence Harvey and Elaine Stritch. It is unknown whether the music was actually used for its intended purpose. The song was included as a bonus track when the album was reissued on CD by Columbia and Legacy Recordings on September 23, 1997.

== Critical reception ==
Professional ratings
Review scores
Source	Rating
AllMusic	2.5/5 stars
DownBeat	4/5 stars
The Encyclopedia of Popular Music	2/5 stars
The Penguin Guide to Jazz Recordings	2.5/4 stars
The Rolling Stone Album Guide	2.5/5 stars

In a contemporary review for DownBeat, Leonard Feather called Quiet Nights a "curious and not entirely satisfying album". He felt "Song #2" ended prematurely while the long-meter arrangement of "Wait till You See Her" sounded unusual, but found "Once upon a Summertime" to be brilliantly recorded and "Summer Night" highlighted by Davis and Feldman's "consistent level of lyrical beauty".

In the Saturday Review, Quiet Nights received praise for Davis' "wonderfully songful trumpet in a Latin-American vein", set against "piercingly lustrous curtains of tone and discreet Caribbean rhythms".

The New York Times' Loren Schoenberg later called it "a slightly flawed but worthy companion" to other classic Davis–Evans recordings.

J. D. Considine was less receptive in The Rolling Stone Album Guide (1992), dismissing the record as "halfhearted" bossa nova atypical from their otherwise exceptional work together.

The album was nominated for a Grammy Award: Best Instrumental Jazz Performance – Large Group or Soloist with Large Group.

== Track listing ==
All songs arranged and conducted by Gil Evans, except "Summer Night".

Side one
No.	Title	Writer(s)	Length
1.	"Song #2"	Trad., Gil Evans, Miles Davis	1:40
2.	"Once Upon a Summertime"	Johnny Mercer, Michel Legrand; Eddie Barclay, Eddy Marnay	3:27
3.	"Aos pés da cruz"	Marino Pinto, José Gonçalves	4:18
4.	"Song No. 1"	Francisco Tárrega, Gil Evans, Miles Davis	4:37

Side two
No.	Title	Writer(s)	Length
1.	"Wait till You See Her"	Richard Rodgers, Lorenz Hart	4:06
2.	"Corcovado"	Antônio Carlos Jobim	2:45
3.	"Summer Night"	Harry Warren, Al Dubin	6:04

- Sides one and two were combined as tracks 1–7 on CD reissues.

1997 reissue bonus track
No.	Title	Writer(s)	Length
8.	"The Time of the Barracudas"	Gil Evans, Miles Davis	12:45

2010 Complete Columbia album Collection bonus tracks
No.	Title	Writer(s)	Length
9.	"Blue Xmas (To Whom It May Concern)"	Bob Dorough, Miles Davis	2:43
10.	"Devil May Care"	Miles Davis	3:27

== Personnel ==
Musicians

- Miles Davis – trumpet
- Shorty Baker, Bernie Glow, Louis Mucci, Ernie Royal – trumpets
- J.J. Johnson, Frank Rehak – trombones
- Ray Alonge, Don Corrado, Julius Watkins – French horns
- Bill Barber – tuba
- Steve Lacy – soprano saxophone
- Albert Block – flute
- Ray Beckenstein, Jerome Richardson – woodwinds
- Garvin Bushell, Bob Tricarico – bassoons
- Janet Putnam – harp
- Paul Chambers – bass
- Jimmy Cobb – drums
- Willie Bobo – bongos
- Elvin Jones – percussion

Miles Davis Quintet ("Summer Night")

- Miles Davis – trumpet
- George Coleman – tenor saxophone
- Victor Feldman – piano
- Ron Carter – bass
- Frank Butler – drums

Additional musicians ("The Time of the Barracudas")

- Miles Davis – trumpet
- Dick Lieb – bass trombone
- Bill Hinshaw, Art Maeba, Richard Perissi – French horns
- Gene Cipriano, Buddy Collette, Paul Horn – woodwinds
- Fred Dutton – bassoon
- Marjorie Call – harp
- Herbie Hancock – piano
- Ron Carter – bass
- Tony Williams – drums

Technical

- Teo Macero – producer
- Irving Townsend – producer on "Time of the Barracudas"
- Fred Plaut – engineer
- Bob Belden – reissue producer and liner notes
- Phil Schaap, Mark Wilder – digital remastering engineer
- Seth Rothstein – reissue project coordinator
- Howard Fritzson – reissue art direction
- Dan Hunstein – photography

== See also ==
- 1960s in jazz
- Orchestral jazz
