= David Geffen Hall =

Concert hall at Lincoln Center in New York City

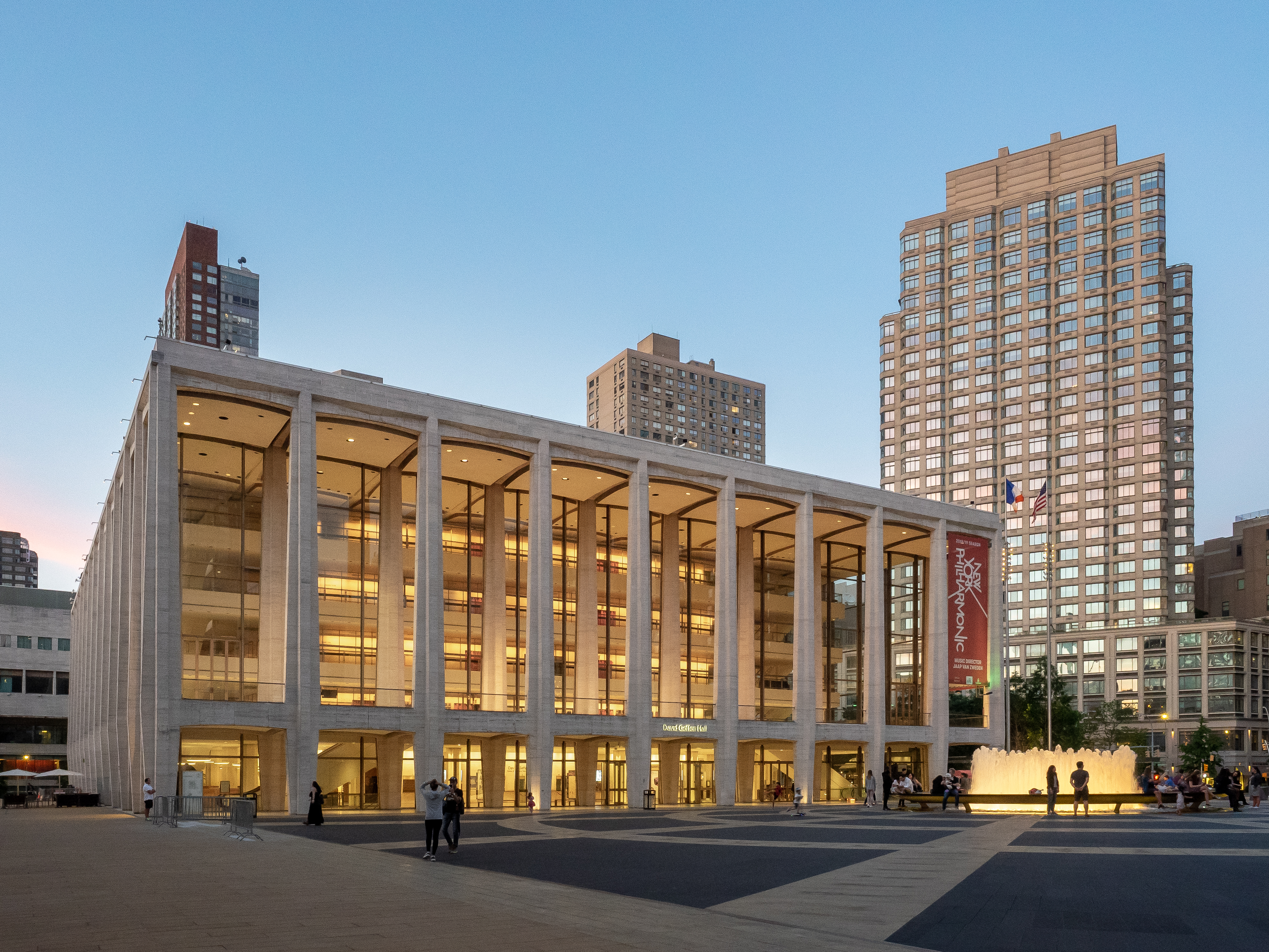
- View from the Plaza (2019)
- Interactive map of David Geffen Hall
- Former names: Philharmonic Hall (1962–1973); Avery Fisher Hall (1973–2015)
- Address: 10 Lincoln Center Plaza
- Location: New York City
- Coordinates: 40°46′22″N 73°58′59″W
- Capacity: 2,200 (Wu Tsai Theater)
- Type: concert hall
- Public transit: Subway: (all times) (late nights) at 66th Street–Lincoln Center; NYC Bus: M5, M7, M11, M20, M66, M104

Construction
- Opened: 1962; 64 years ago
- Architect: Max Abramovitz

Tenant
- New York Philharmonic

David Geffen Hall is a concert hall at Lincoln Center on the Upper West Side of Manhattan in New York City. The 2,200-seat auditorium opened in 1962, and is the home of the New York Philharmonic.

The facility, designed by Max Abramovitz, was originally named Philharmonic Hall and was renamed Avery Fisher Hall in honor of philanthropist Avery Fisher, who donated $10.5 million ($76 million today) to the orchestra in 1973. In November 2014, Lincoln Center officials announced Fisher's name would be removed from the Hall so that naming rights could be sold to the highest bidder as part of a $500 million fund-raising campaign to refurbish the Hall. In 2015, the Hall acquired its present name after David Geffen donated $100 million to Lincoln Center.

== Renovations ==
=== 20th-century renovations ===
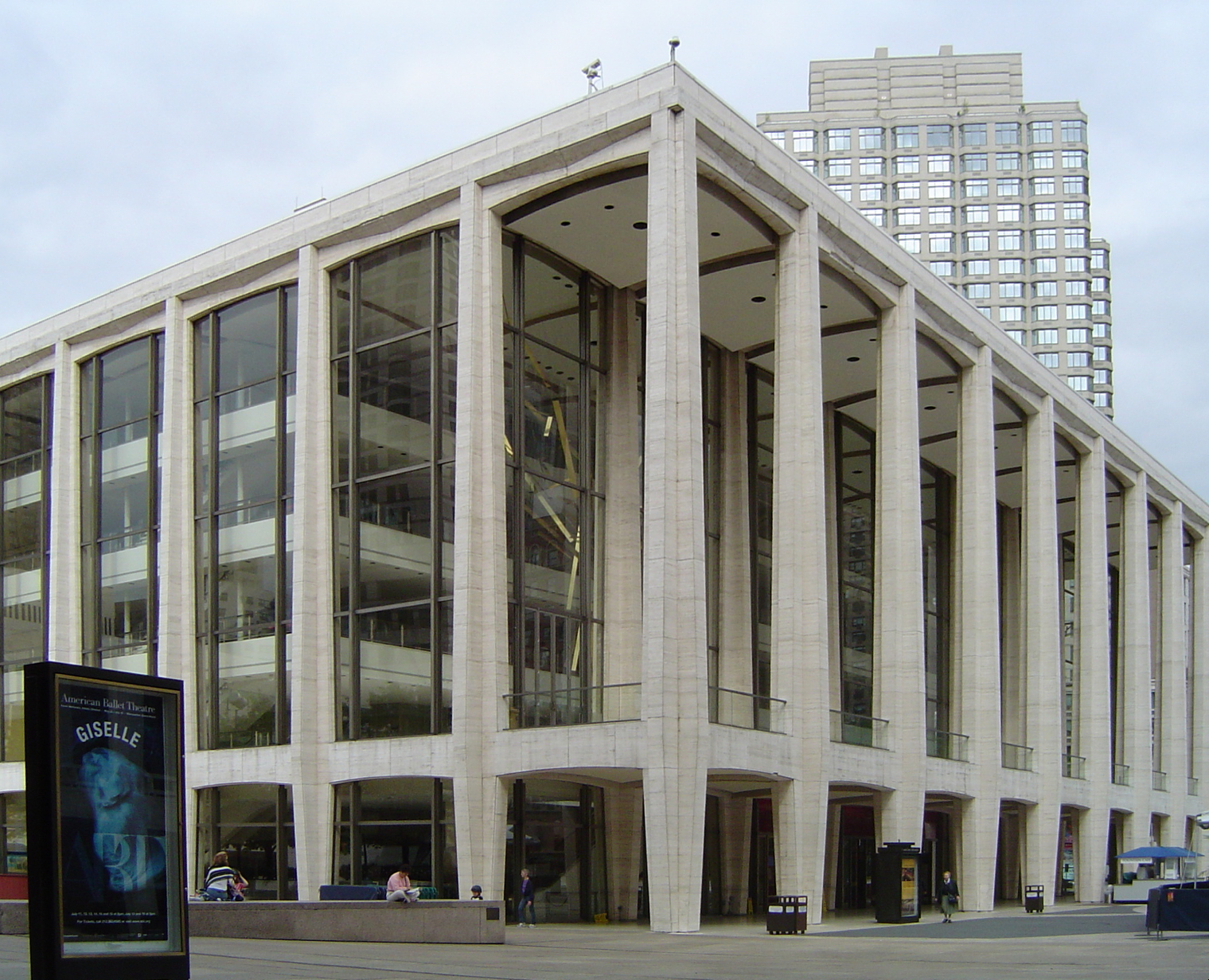
Known as Avery Fisher Hall (2005)

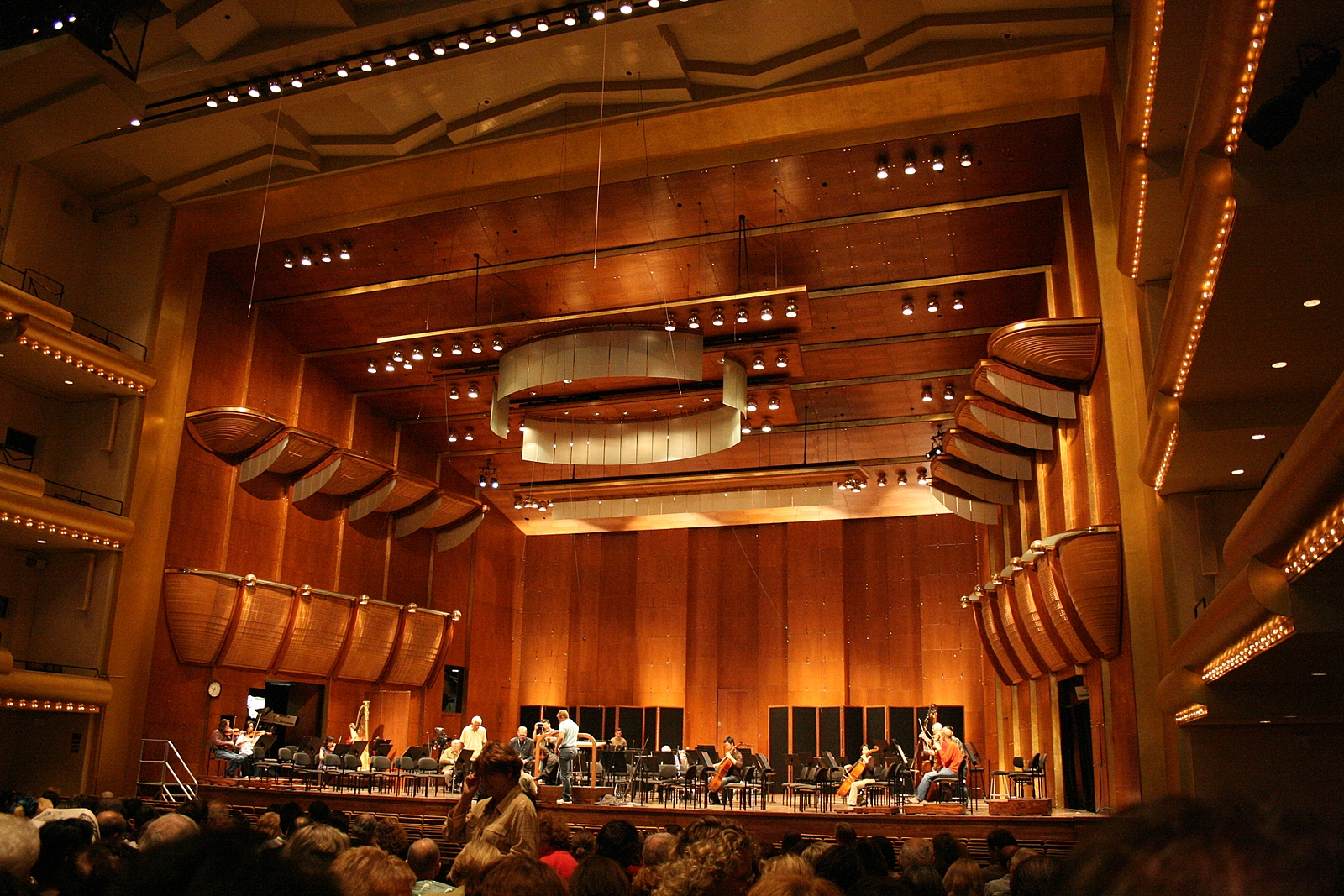
The interior of David Geffen Hall (2007)

The Hall underwent extensive renovations in 1976, to address acoustical problems that had been present since its opening. Another, smaller renovation attempted to address still-unresolved problems in 1992. Both projects achieved limited success.

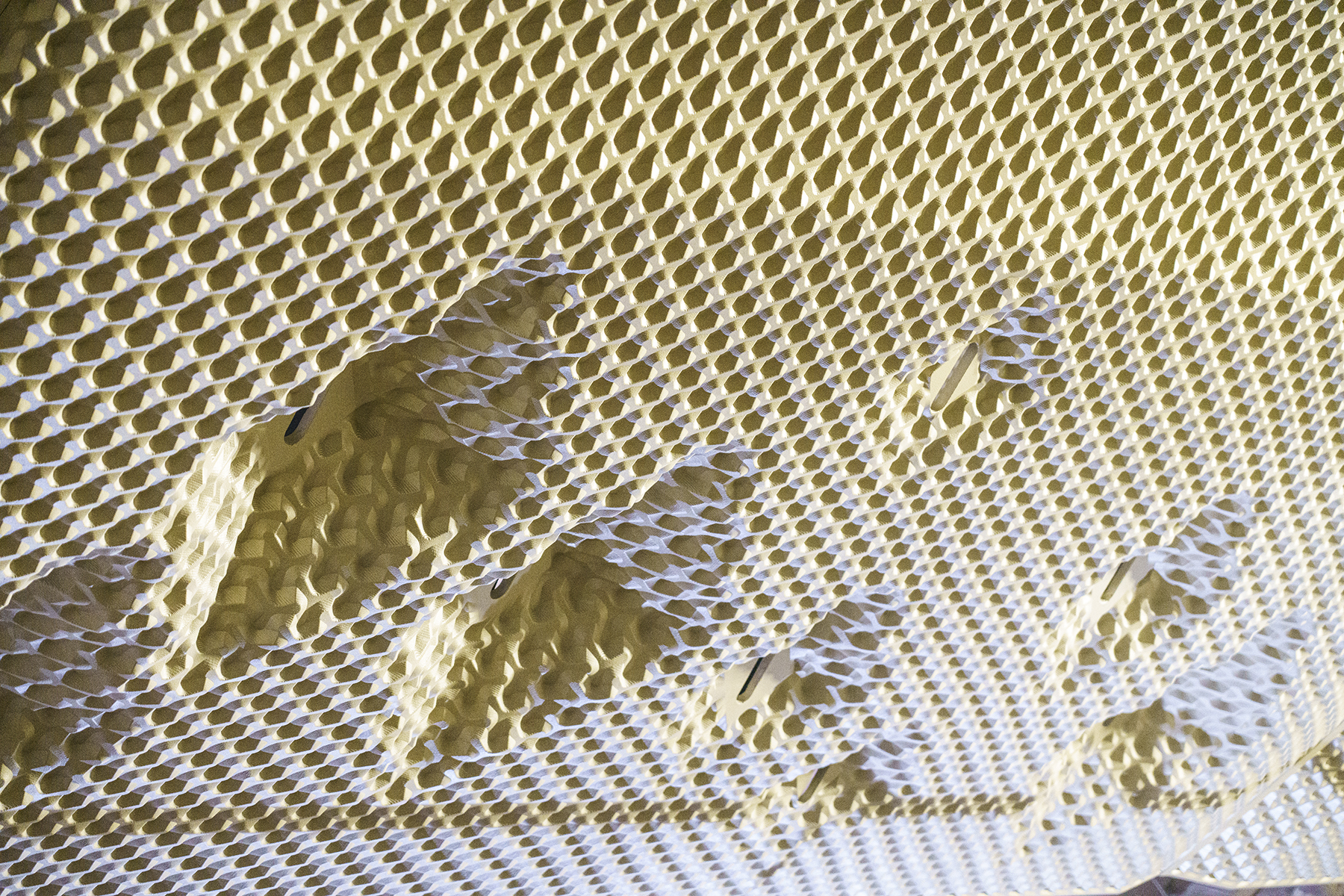
Acoustic ceiling baffles during 2022 renovation

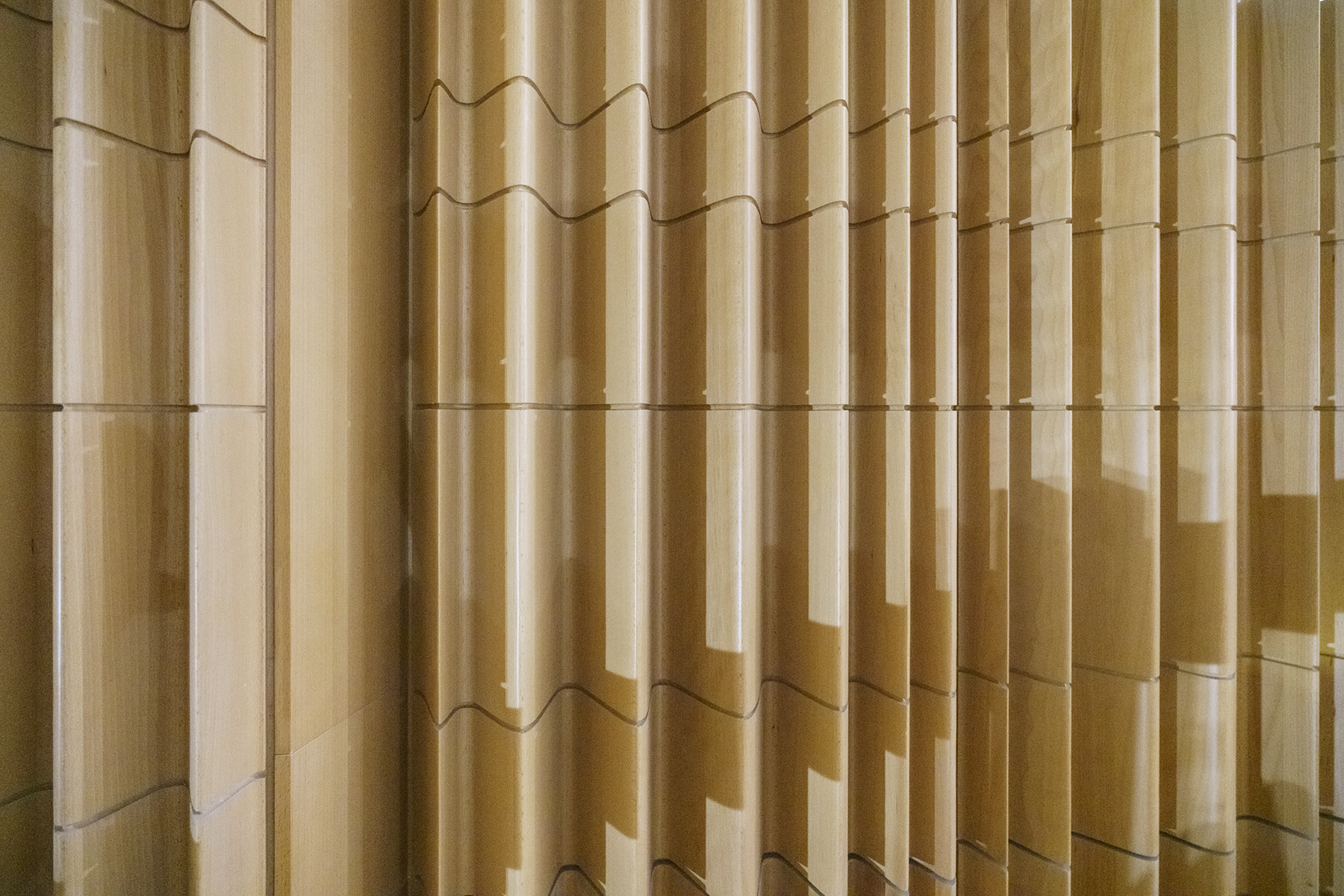
Detail view of acoustic wood wall paneling during 2022 renovation

=== 21st-century renovation ===
Lincoln Center invited nine architects to submit plans for Avery Fisher Hall's renovation in 2002, selecting three architecture firms as finalists that June. In May 2004, the orchestra announced that the building would undergo renovations in 2009. Norman Foster, Baron Foster of Thames Bank, was hired in 2005 to design a renovation of the Hall, but he later resigned from the project. In June 2006, The New York Times reported that the construction had been delayed until the summer of 2010. By 2012, the project's start date had been postponed to 2017. The shell of the building was to be left intact, and work was to focus on improving the hall's acoustics, modernizing patron amenities, and reconfiguring the auditorium.

On November 13, 2014, Lincoln Center officials announced their intention to remove Avery Fisher's name from the Hall and sell naming rights to the highest bidder as part of a $500 million fundraising campaign for its refurbishment. Lincoln Center chairwoman Katherine Farley said, "It will be an opportunity for a major name on a great New York jewel." Fisher's three children agreed to the deal for $15 million. In September 2015, Geffen donated $100 million for the Hall's renovation, and the Hall was renamed for him. Geffen's donation of $100 million was seen as a jump-start for the planned renovation, but on October 3, 2017, the Philharmonic announced that existing renovation plans for the Hall had been scrapped.

In December 2019, it was announced that the plans to renovate the Hall would finally proceed, with construction beginning in 2022. The work included acoustically and aesthetically redesigning it, removing over 500 seats, adding balcony seating wrapping around the entire stage, and making the stage tiered and moving it farther forward. Deborah Borda, the president of the New York Philharmonic, said, "We have to do it right this time, and this, I think, is the plan to do it." Diamond Schmitt was appointed Design and Executive Architect and led the complete redesign of the hall's new concert theater and overall masterplan; with Tod Williams Billie Tsien Architects guiding the design of the public spaces. The new design includes a more compact hall, open social areas with bars, and video walls for live streaming performances and other events.

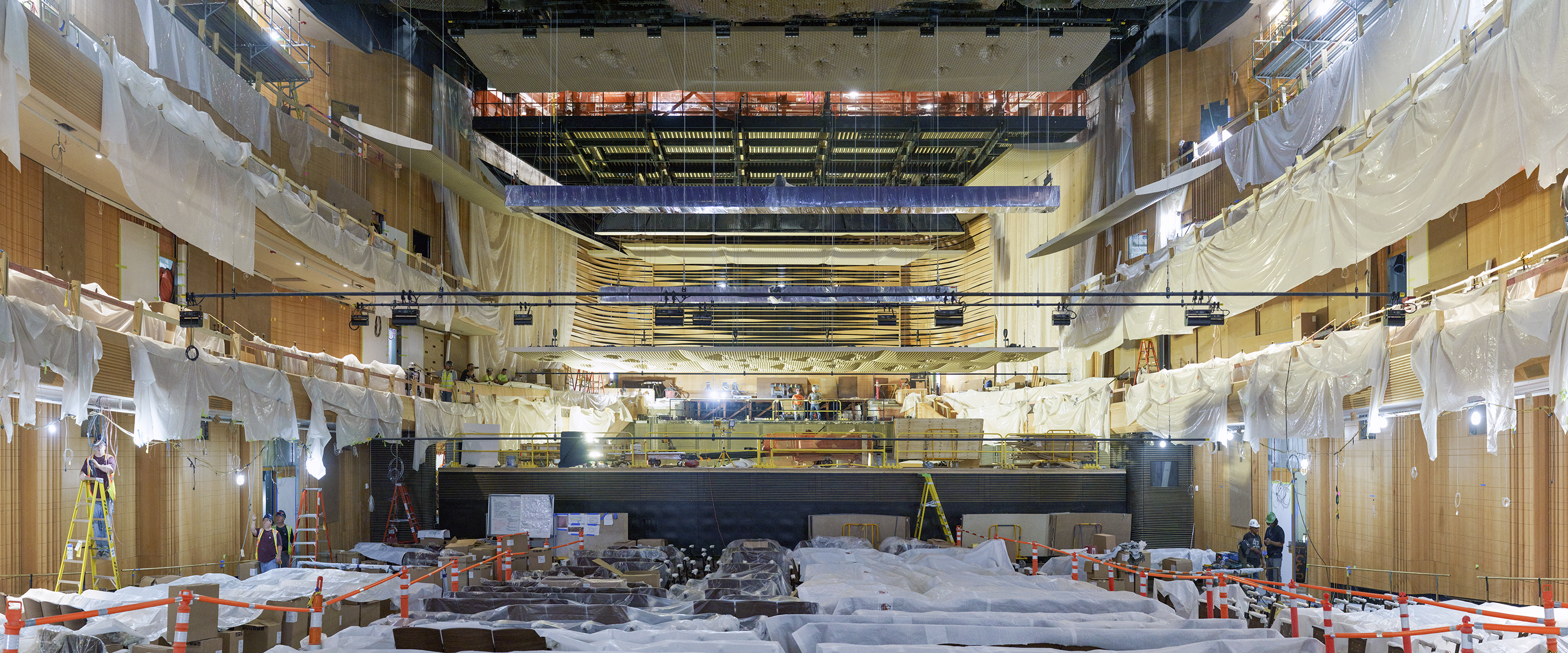
Concert Hall under construction

Plans for the hall's renovation were accelerated after Lincoln Center closed in March 2020 due to the COVID-19 pandemic in New York City. In mid-2020, Borda announced that because of pandemic-related cancellations of performances, Lincoln Center would commence preliminary renovation work on the Hall before the Philharmonic's planned return to performances on January 6, The orchestra later canceled all scheduled performances at the Hall through June 13, 2021. On October 3, 2022, the main concert hall was renamed the Wu Tsai Theater in honor of a $50 million donation from Joseph Tsai and Clara Wu Tsai. The hall reopened on October 8, 2022, following a $550 million renovation. The renovation received a 2026 design award from the American Institute of Architects' New York chapter.

== Acoustics ==
Buildings of Lincoln Center
Buildings and structures in Lincoln Center:
1 Samuel B. and David Rose Building (includes Walter Reade Theater)
2 Juilliard School
3 Alice Tully Hall
4 Vivian Beaumont Theater (includes Mitzi E. Newhouse Theater and Claire Tow Theater)
5 Elinor Bunin Monroe Film Center
6 David Geffen Hall
7 New York Public Library for the Performing Arts (includes Bruno Walter Auditorium)
8 Metropolitan Opera House
9 Josie Robertson Plaza with Revson Fountain
10 Damrosch Park
11 David H. Koch Theater
12 David Rubenstein Atrium
13 Jazz at Lincoln Center

Architects hired the acoustical consulting division of Bolt, Beranek and Newman (BBN) to design the original interior acoustics for the hall. Their acousticians recommended a 2,400 seat "shoebox" design with narrowly spaced parallel sides (similar in shape to the acoustically acclaimed Symphony Hall, Boston). Lincoln Center officials initially agreed with the recommendation, and BBN provided a series of design specifications and recommendations. However, the New York Herald Tribune began a campaign to increase the seating capacity of the new hall and late in the design stage it was expanded to accommodate the critics' desires, invalidating much of BBN's acoustical work. BBN engineers told Lincoln Center management the hall would sound different from their initial intent, but they could not predict what the changes would do.

The first of Lincoln Center's buildings to be completed, Philharmonic Hall opened September 23, 1962, to mixed reviews. The concert, featuring Leonard Bernstein, the New York Philharmonic, and a host of operatic stars such as Eileen Farrell and Robert Merrill, was televised live on CBS. The opening week of concerts included performances by a specially invited list of guest orchestras (Boston, Philadelphia, and Cleveland), who regularly appeared at Carnegie Hall each season, as well as the new hall's resident ensemble. Several reporters panned the hall, while at least two conductors praised the acoustics. While the initial intention had been that Philharmonic Hall would replace Carnegie Hall, which could then be demolished, that did not happen.

Management made several attempts to remedy the induced acoustical problems, with little success, leading to a substantial 1970s renovation designed by acoustician Cyril Harris in conjunction with project architect Philip Johnson. It included demolishing the hall's interior, selling its pipe organ to California's Crystal Cathedral, and rebuilding a new auditorium within the outer framework and facade. While initial reaction to the improvements was favorable and some advocates remained steadfast, overall feelings about the new hall's sound soured and acoustics there continued to be problematic. One assessment by Robert C. Ehle stated:

The seating capacity is large (around 2,600 seats) and the sidewalls are too far apart to provide early reflections to the center seats. The ceiling is high to increase reverberation time but the clouds are too high to reinforce early reflections adequately. The bass is weak because the very large stage does not adequately reinforce the low string instruments.

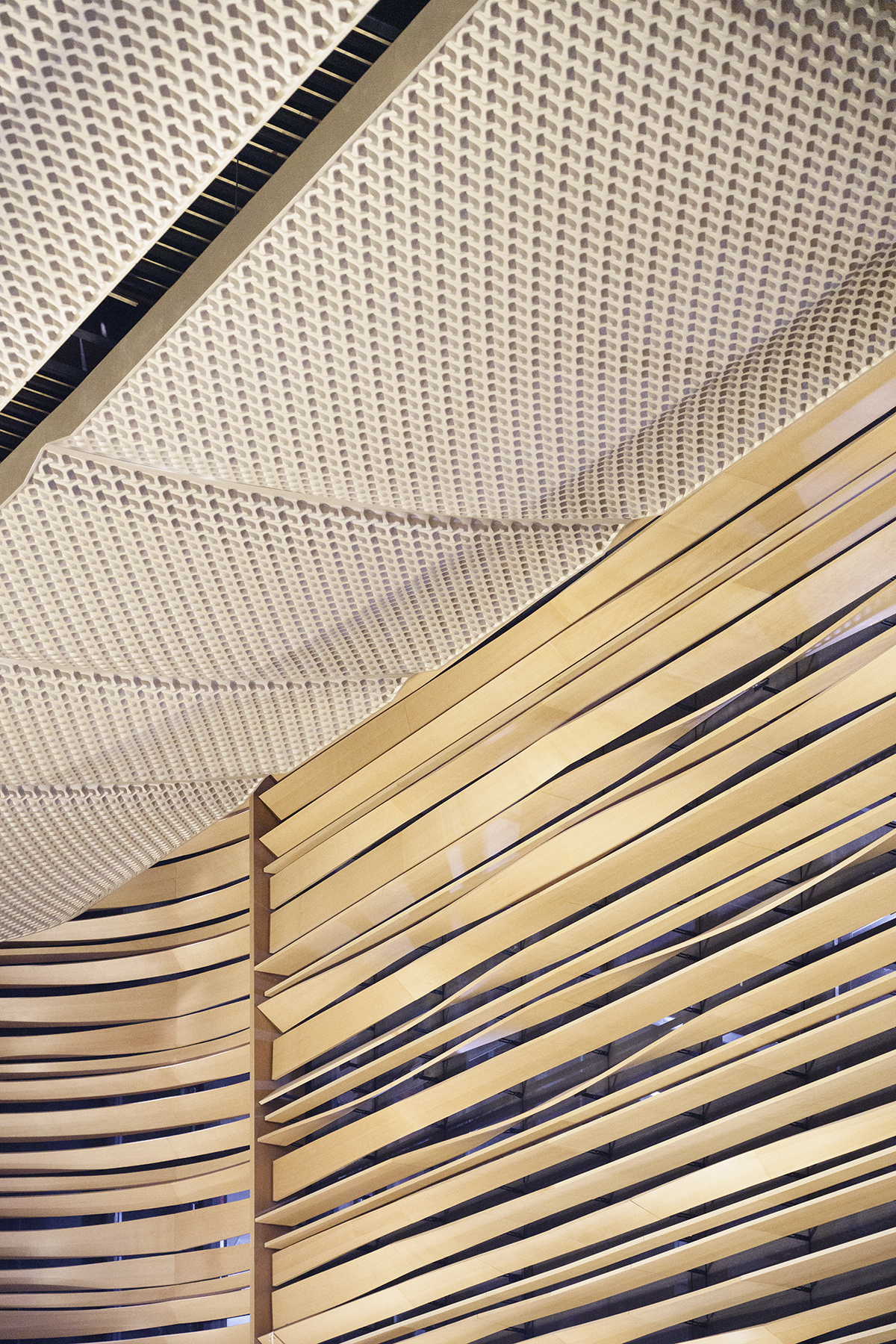
Various acoustic surface strategies are employed to meet the sound requirements

In December 1977, High Fidelity magazine published an article that stated members of the Philharmonic disliked the sound so much they referred to the venue as "A Very Fishy Hall." In 1992, under the tenure of Kurt Masur with the New York Philharmonic, several solid maple wood convex surfaces were installed on the side walls and suspended from the ceiling of the stage to improve acoustics. The maple was specially selected to minimize its grain pattern. The new components are filled with fiberglass to deaden vibrations.

The ongoing problems with the hall's acoustics eventually led the New York Philharmonic to consider a merger with Carnegie Hall in 2003, which would have returned the Philharmonic to Carnegie Hall for most of its concerts each season. However, both sides abandoned talks after four months.

In 2005 and 2006, the Mostly Mozart Festival experimented with extending the front of stage to improve acoustics.

A major goal of the $550 million renovation of David Geffen Hall, from 2020 to 2022, was to improve the acoustics in the main concert hall. According to Zachary Woolfe of The New York Times, the renovation substantially improved the acoustics, but some significant acoustical problems remained.

== Notable events ==
David Geffen Hall is used today for many events, both musical and non-musical. As part of its Great Performers series, Lincoln Center presents visiting orchestras in David Geffen Hall, such as the London Symphony Orchestra, the Singapore Symphony Orchestra, the Rotterdam Philharmonic Orchestra, and the Kirov Orchestra of the Mariinsky Theatre. The PBS series Live from Lincoln Center also features performances from the Hall.

Composer Samuel Barber was commissioned to write his Piano Concerto for the opening of the venue, and the work was premiered at the inaugural concert on September 23, 1962, with pianist John Browning. An early television concert from Philharmonic Hall featured Leonard Bernstein and the New York Philharmonic in one of their Young People's Concerts. It was the first of many concerts televised from Philharmonic Hall, which had been previously televised from Carnegie Hall beginning in 1958. The 1962 program concentrated on concert hall acoustics, and, like the opening night concert, was shown over the CBS television network. It was entitled "The Sound of a Hall".

It was the main venue for the first New York Film Festival in 1963 and is still a festival venue.

A February 12, 1964 performance by Miles Davis at Philharmonic Hall to benefit the Mississippi Freedom Summer was released on two albums, My Funny Valentine and Four & More.

Bob Dylan performed at Philharmonic Hall on October 31, 1964. The concert was released as The Bootleg Series Vol. 6: Bob Dylan Live 1964, Concert at Philharmonic Hall in 2004.

The Supremes performed there on October 15, 1965. The iconic poster for the show was designed by Joe Eula.

Simon & Garfunkel recorded their live album Live from New York City, 1967 here on January 22, 1967.

In 1995, the star-studded charity show The Wizard of Oz in Concert: Dreams Come True was staged. The show, which starred Jewel, Jackson Browne, Roger Daltrey, and Nathan Lane as the principal characters from the 1939 film, benefited the Children's Defense Fund, and aired subsequently on TNT, TBS, PBS, and VH-1.

The hall hosted the world premiere of Steven Spielberg's film War Horse on December 4, 2011, and the North American premiere of Bradley Cooper's Maestro, a Leonard Bernstein biopic, on October 2, 2023.

== See also ==
- List of concert halls
