= All of You (Cole Porter song) =

1954 popular song by Cole Porter

"All of You" is a popular song written by Cole Porter and published in 1954.

It was introduced by Don Ameche in the 1955 Broadway musical Silk Stockings and featured in the 1957 film version as well, when it was sung by Fred Astaire. In June 2026, CBS News included the song in its list of the 250 essential American songs of the past 250 years.

First eight measures of All of You

== Notable recordings ==
- Ahmad Jamal – for the album Ahmad Jamal Plays (1955)
- Modern Jazz Quartet – on the 1955 album Concorde.
- Ella Fitzgerald – on her album Ella Fitzgerald Sings the Cole Porter Song Book (1956)
- Miles Davis – on 'Round About Midnight (1957) and My Funny Valentine: Miles Davis in Concert (1964).
- Sarah Vaughan – for the album After Hours at the London House (1959)
- Bobby Darin (1963) – included on the compilation album The Swinging Side of Bobby Darin (2005).
- Tony Bennett – included as a bonus track on the CD reissue of When Lights Are Low (1964). Recorded again for Steppin' Out (1993)
- Frank Sinatra – on Trilogy: Past Present Future (1980).
- Keith Jarrett – on the albums Tribute (1990), and Standards in Norway (1995)

== In film ==
- Nick Apollo Forte – in the movie Broadway Danny Rose (1984)
