= Seven Steps to Heaven =

Studio album by Miles Davis
- Released: July 15, 1963
- Recorded: April 16–May 14, 1963
- Studios: Columbia Studios, Hollywood; Columbia 30th Street Studio, New York City
- Genre: Jazz
- Length: 46:08
- Label: Columbia
- Producer: Teo Macero

Miles Davis chronology
Someday My Prince Will Come (1961)	Seven Steps to Heaven (1963)	Quiet Nights (1963)

Professional ratings
Review scores
Source	Rating
AllMusic	4.5/5 stars
DownBeat (Original release)	5/5 stars
DownBeat (1992)	3.5/5 stars
The Encyclopedia of Popular Music	3/5 stars
MusicHound Jazz	3.5/5 stars
The Penguin Guide to Jazz	3/4 stars
The Rolling Stone Album Guide	4/5 stars

Seven Steps to Heaven is a studio album by American jazz musician Miles Davis, released on July 15, 1963, by Columbia Records. The recording sessions took place at Columbia Studios in Los Angeles on April 16 and 17, 1963, and at Columbia's 30th Street Studios in Manhattan on May 14, 1963. The album presents the Miles Davis Quintet in transition, with the New York session introducing the rhythm section of Herbie Hancock, Ron Carter and Tony Williams, who would become Davis' regular sidemen for the next five years. Upon release, the album was Davis' most successful on the Billboard pop LPs chart up to that point, peaking at number 62. It was also nomianted for two Grammy Awards: Best Instrumental Jazz Performance – Large Group and Best Instrumental Jazz Performance – Soloist or Small Group.

== Background ==
After the unfinished sessions for Quiet Nights in 1962, Davis returned to club work. However, he had a series of health problems in 1962, which made his live dates inconsistent and meant that he missed gigs, with financial repercussions. Faced with diminishing returns, by late 1962 his entire band quit, Hank Mobley to a solo career, and the rhythm section of Wynton Kelly, Paul Chambers, and Jimmy Cobb to work as a unit. The departure of Chambers especially was a blow, as he had been the only man still left from the original formation of the quintet in 1955.

With club dates to fulfill, Davis hired several musicians to fill in: Frank Strozier on alto saxophone and Harold Mabern on piano, with George Coleman and Ron Carter arriving early in the year. For shows on the West Coast in March, Davis added drummer Frank Butler, but when it came time for the sessions, Davis jettisoned Strozier and Mabern in favor of pianist Victor Feldman. With a lucrative career as a session musician, Feldman declined Davis's offer to join the group, and both he and Butler were left behind in California. Back in New York, Davis located the musicians who would be with him for the next six years, Herbie Hancock and Tony Williams; with Carter and Coleman, the new Miles Davis Quintet was in place. Williams, then only 17 years old, had been working with Jackie McLean, and Hancock had already scored a hit single with "Watermelon Man", recorded by percussionist Mongo Santamaria.

== Music ==
The assembled group at the April recording sessions finished enough material for an entire album, but Davis decided the uptempo numbers were not acceptable, and rerecorded all of them with the new group during the May sessions in New York. Two of the ballad tunes recorded in Los Angeles were old – "Baby Won't You Please Come Home", written in 1919 and a hit for Bessie Smith in 1923, while "Basin Street Blues" had been introduced by Louis Armstrong in 1928. Neither features Coleman; both are quartet performances with Davis and the rhythm section.

The uptempo numbers from New York in May include Feldman's "Joshua", which remained in the Davis performance book for the rest of the decade. This is the last of Davis' studio albums with standards rather than band originals; they were gone by the time the quintet made its last personnel change, Wayne Shorter replacing Coleman in late 1964.

On March 15, 2005, Legacy Records reissued the album for compact disc with two bonus tracks, both from the Los Angeles sessions in April. "Summer Night" had been previously released on Quiet Nights to bring that album up to an acceptable running time.

== Track listing ==
Side one
No.	Title	Writer(s)	Length
1.	"Basin Street Blues"	Spencer Williams	10:29
2.	"Seven Steps to Heaven"	Victor Feldman, Miles Davis	6:26
3.	"I Fall in Love Too Easily"	Jule Styne, Sammy Cahn	6:46

Side two
No.	Title	Writer(s)	Length
4.	"So Near, So Far"	Tony Crombie, Benny Green	6:59
5.	"Baby Won't You Please Come Home"	Clarence Williams, Charles Warfield	8:28
6.	"Joshua"	Victor Feldman	7:00

- Sides one and two were combined as tracks 1–6 on CD reissues.

2005 reissue bonus tracks
No.	Title	Writer(s)	Length
7.	"So Near, So Far" (alternative version)	Tony Crombie, Benny Green	5:11
8.	"Summer Night"	Harry Warren, Al Dubin	6:02

== Personnel ==
Tracks 1, 3, 5, 7 & 8 – recorded in Hollywood on April 16 or 17, 1963

- Miles Davis – trumpet
- George Coleman – tenor saxophone
- Victor Feldman – piano
- Ron Carter – bass
- Frank Butler – drums

Tracks 2, 4 & 6 – recorded in New York on May 14, 1963

- Miles Davis – trumpet
- George Coleman – tenor saxophone
- Herbie Hancock – piano
- Ron Carter – bass
- Tony Williams – drums
