= Bob Belden =

American saxophonist, composer, and bandleader (1956–2015)

- Born: James Robert Belden; October 31, 1956; Evanston, Illinois, U.S.
- Died: May 20, 2015 (aged 58) New York City
- Genres: Jazz, big band, jazz fusion
- Occupations: Musician, composer, arranger, band leader, producer
- Instrument: Saxophone
- Years active: 1970s–2015
- Labels: Sunnyside, Blue Note, RareNoise
- Formerly of: Woody Herman, Tim Hagans

James Robert Belden (October 31, 1956 – May 20, 2015) was an American saxophonist, arranger, composer, bandleader, and producer. As a producer, he was mostly associated with the remastering of recordings by trumpeter Miles Davis for Columbia Records.

== Biography ==
Belden, born in Evanston, Illinois, grew up in the Charleston, South Carolina suburb of Goose Creek. He briefly attended the University of South Carolina where he met composer Jay Knowles who introduced him to the music of Gil Evans. He then studied saxophone and composition at the University of North Texas before joining the Woody Herman band.

He recorded his first album Treasure Island in 1990. This was followed by a series of adventurous albums featuring jazz-tinged arrangements of contemporary pop songs culminating with Black Dahlia in 2001.

In 2008, he arranged and produced Miles from India, a world fusion music recording based on the compositions of Miles Davis for which he assembled a group made up of Davis alumni and musicians from India. In addition to his work as arranger, composer, conductor and A & R director, Belden contributed numerous liner notes for noted recordings, such as "Lou's Blues" by Lou Marini and the Magic City Jazz Orchestra.

Some of his work as the author of liner notes received Grammy Awards. In early 2015, Belden became the first American musician in 35 years to bring a band from the USA to perform in Iran.

Belden died of a heart attack on May 20, 2015, at Lenox Hill Hospital in Manhattan. He was 58.

== Discography ==
=== As leader/co-leader ===
- Treasure Island (Sunnyside, 1990)
- Straight to My Heart: The Music of Sting (Blue Note, 1991)
- Puccini's Turandot (Blue Note, 1993)
- When the Doves Cry: The Music of Prince (Metro Blue, 1994) – also as conductor and producer
- La Cigale (Sunnyside, 1998) – live rec. 1990
- Black Dahlia (Blue Note, 2001)

Co-leader with Tim Hagans: Animation

- Re-Animation Live! (Blue Note, 1999)
- Animation – Imagination (Blue Note, 1999)
- Agemo (RareNoise, 2011)
- Asiento (RareNoise, 2011)
- Transparent Heart (RareNoise, 2012)
- Machine Language (RareNoise, 2015)

Collaboration
With Nicholas Payton, John Hart, Sam Yahel and Billy Drummond

- Mysterious Shorter (Chesky, 2006) – also as producer

=== As producer ===
- Bob Belden's Shades of Blue (Blue Note, 1996) – omnibus
- Bob Belden Presents: Strawberry Fields (Blue Note, 1996) – omnibus
- Miles Davis & Gil Evans, The Complete Columbia Studio Recordings (Columbia, 1996)[6CD] – box set
- Tapestry – The Blue Note Cover Series (Blue Note, 1997)
- Miles Davis, Miles Davis Quintet 1965–1968 (Columbia, 1998)[6CD] – box set
- Weather Report, Live and Unreleased (Columbia, 2002)[2CD] – compilation
- Weather Report, Forecast: Tomorrow (Columbia, 2006)[3CD + DVD-Video] – compilation
- Three Days of Rain (Sunnyside, 2006) – rec. 2001
- V.A., Miles from India (Times Square, 2008)[2CD]

=== As a member ===
New York City Horns

- Incognito, Beneath the Surface (Talkin' Loud, 1996)

=== As conductor ===
McCoy Tyner Big Band

- The Turning Point (Verve, 1992) – rec. 1991
- Journey (Verve, 1993)

Others

- Paquito D'Rivera, 100 Years of Latin Love Songs (Heads Up, 1998)

== Grammy Awards ==
- 1997: Best Historical Album for Miles Davis & Gil Evans, The Complete Columbia Studio Recordings (with Phil Schaap)
- 1997: Best Album Notes for Miles Davis & Gil Evans, The Complete Columbia Studio Recordings (with Bill Kirchner, George Avakian & Phil Schaap)
- 1999: Best Album Notes for Miles Davis, Miles Davis Quintet 1965–1968 (with Michael Cuscuna & Todd Coolman)

== See also ==
- List of jazz arrangers
