= So What (Miles Davis composition) =

1959 composition

Composition by Miles Davis

from the album Kind of Blue
- Released: August 17, 1959
- Recorded: March 2, 1959
- Genre: Modal jazz
- Length: 9:22
- Label: Columbia
- Composer: Miles Davis
- Producer: Irving Townsend

"So What" is the first track on the 1959 album Kind of Blue by American trumpeter Miles Davis.

It is one of the best-known examples of modal jazz, set in the Dorian mode and consisting of 16 bars of D Dorian, followed by eight bars of E♭ Dorian and another eight of D Dorian. This AABA structure puts it in the thirty-two-bar format of American popular song.

The piano-and-bass introduction for the piece was written by Gil Evans for Bill Evans (no relation) and Paul Chambers on Kind of Blue. An orchestrated version by Gil Evans of this introduction is later to be found on a television broadcast given by Miles's first quintet (minus Cannonball Adderley, who was ill that day) and the Gil Evans Orchestra; the orchestra gave the introduction, after which the quintet played the rest of "So What". The use of the double bass to play the central theme makes the piece unusual. This arrangement was later performed and recorded as part of the album Miles Davis at Carnegie Hall.

While the track is taken at a very moderate tempo on Kind of Blue, it is played at a speedy tempo on later live recordings by the quintet, such as Miles Davis & John Coltrane The Final Tour: The Bootleg Series, Vol. 6, and even faster by Miles Davis's second quintet in the mid-1960s, for example on Four & More.

The distinctive voicing employed by Bill Evans for the chords that interject the head: from the bottom up, three notes at intervals of a perfect fourth followed by a major third, has been given the name "So What chord" (shown below) by such theorists as Mark Levine.

The same chord structure was later used by John Coltrane for his standard "Impressions". Both pieces originate in Ahmad Jamal's 1955 cover of Morton Gould's "Pavanne".

In 2024, "So What" was ranked 492 on Rolling Stone's 500 Greatest Songs of All Time.

== See also ==
- Bar-line shift
