= 1958 Miles =

Compilation album by Miles Davis
- Released: 1979
- Recorded: May 26 and September 9, 1958
- Studio: Columbia 30th Street, New York City
- Genre: Hard bop; modal jazz
- Length: 63:50 (CD 1991)
- Label: CBS/Sony 20AP 1401
- Producer: Cal Lampley (May 26), George Avakian (March 4), Teo Macero (Sept. 9)

Miles Davis chronology
| Dark Magus (1977) | 1958 Miles (1979) | Circle in the Round (1979) |

1991 reissue cover
- '58 Miles Featuring Stella by Starlight

1958 Miles is a compilation album by American jazz musician Miles Davis, released in 1979 exclusively in Japan on CBS/Sony. These recordings along with the Milestones sessions from earlier that year, are considered elemental in Miles Davis' transition from bebop to the modal style of jazz and lead the way to his best-known work, Kind of Blue.

== Recording and release history ==
The recording session from May 26, 1958 at Columbia's 30th Street Studio, which made up most of album, featured John Coltrane and Cannonball Adderley on saxophone, Bill Evans on piano –his first recording with Davis–, bassist Paul Chambers and Jimmy Cobb on drums. Three of the songs were already released as part of the album Jazz Track in November 1959. "Love for Sale", a further track of this session date, was added, as well as a recording of "Little Melonae" from earlier that year, on March 4, on which Philly Joe Jones was still the drummer of the band, and Red Garland played the piano. "Love for Sale" was previously released in 1975 on a Columbia compilation album on two LPs called Black Giants produced by Teo Macero.

In 1991, after digital restoration and mastering the album released internationally on CD (and on Musicassette) as '58 Sessions Featuring Stella by Starlight as part of the Columbia Jazz Masterpieces series. Three tracks of about another 30 minutes were added, taken from Jazz at the Plaza Vol. I, the sextets live performance at a party at the Plaza Hotel in New York City on September 9, 1958, released for the first time only in 1973. Sony remastered the original album again for their Japanese series Master Sound in 1996, and re-released it in 2001 with two bonus tracks. The complete 1958 sessions for Columbia were finally issued alltogether in the box set The Complete Columbia Recordings of Miles Davis with John Coltrane.

The tracks from May 26 were also released on a bonus disc of the 50th anniversary collector's edition of Kind of Blue. They were remastered again and reissued for themselves (without any additional tracks) on vinyl, CD, and digital platforms in 2024 under the album title Birth of the Blue.

== Background ==
No chords ... gives you a lot more freedom and space to hear things. When you go this way, you can go on forever. You don't have to worry about changes and you can do more with the [melody] line. It becomes a challenge to see how melodically inventive you can be ... fewer chords but infinite possibilities as to what to do with them.

— Davis on using modes rather than chord progressions as a harmonic framework, in The Jazz Review, 1958

In 1958, Miles Davis was one of many jazz musicians growing dissatisfied with bebop, seeing its increasingly complex chord changes as hindering musical creativity. Five years earlier, jazz pianist, composer and theorist George Russell published his Lydian Chromatic Concept of Tonal Organization (1953), which offered an alternative to the practice of musical improvisation based on chords. Abandoning the traditional major and minor key relationships of classical music, Russell developed a new formulation using musical scales, or a series of scales, for improvisations. Russell's approach to improvisation came to be known as modal in jazz. Davis viewed Russell's methods of composition as a means of getting away from the dense chord-laden compositions of his time, which Davis had labeled as "thick".

In contrast to the conventional method of composing during the time, modal compositions were to be written as a series of sketches in which each performer is given a set of scales that defines the parameters of their improvisation. Modal composition, with its reliance on musical scales and modes, represented, as Davis called it, "a return to melody". According to Davis, "Classical composers—some of them—have been writing this way for years, but jazz musicians seldom have". In early 1958, Davis began using this approach with his sextet, a jazz ensemble made up of alto sax player Julian "Cannonball" Adderley, tenor saxophonist John Coltrane, pianist Red Garland, bassist Paul Chambers, and drummer Philly Joe Jones. Influenced by Russell's ideas, Davis implemented his first modal composition with the title track of Milestones (1958), which was based on two modes, recorded in April of that year. Instead of soloing in the straight, conventional, melodic way, Davis's new style of improvisation featured rapid mode and scale changes played against sparse chord changes. Davis' acclaimed collaboration with Gil Evans on Porgy and Bess gave him an opportunity to experiment with Russell's concept, as Evans' third stream compositions for Davis contained only a musical scale and no chords, the basis for modality.

=== The sextet ===
Following the Milestones sessions, Davis made significant personnel changes. By the time Coltrane had returned from Thelonious Monk's quartet to Davis's sextet, pianist Red Garland and drummer Philly Joe Jones were replaced by Bill Evans and Jimmy Cobb. Problems with money, tardiness, attitude and heroin preceding the Milestones sessions troubled Garland and Jones. During one of these sessions, an incident occurred between Davis and Garland when he was playing piano on the song "Sid's Ahead". Apparently, Davis leaned over his pianist's shoulder, commenting on his piano playing. What was said by Davis is unknown, but it made Garland leave the studio for good, with Davis then playing piano on the track, and straining the friendship between the two musicians.

Recommended by Russell Bill Evans was subsequently hired by Davis for his rich precision and ability to understate the piano's solo voice. While Davis was fascinated and taken with the new sound Evans brought and the challenges it inspired, the remainder of the band, including Cannonball Adderley, preferred Garland's harder, more rhythmic sound. In a 1960 column for Down Beat, Adderley elaborated on his initial reaction to the change, stating "Especially when he started to use Bill Evans, Miles changed his style from very hard to a softer approach. Bill was brilliant in other areas, but he couldn't make the real things come off." Despite his preference for a harder piano style, Adderley opened up to the new sound. He later used Bill Evans on a July 1958 session for his record Portrait of Cannonball. Evans' unique piano sound and Davis' experiments with modal jazz would culminate on the '58 Sessions. Documented in a studio session from May 1958 at Columbia's 30th Street Studio and a live gig at the Plaza Hotel's Persian Room in September of that same year, these sessions marked the advent of Davis' new sextet, during what had already become a pivotal year for Davis.

== Music ==
=== Studio session ===
The entire session has an informal feel that is unusual for a studio date. Upon hearing it again I immediately knew why I was so taken with it those many years ago.

— Ira Gitler, 1979

Featured as the first side of 1958 Miles, the May 26 session took place at Columbia's 30th Street Studio in New York City. The songs recorded were previously issued on the B-side of Jazz Track, an LP that consisted primarily of Davis' soundtrack to the 1958 French film Ascenseur pour l'échafaud by Louis Malle, with Jeanne Moreau as the female lead. In contrast to the mood pieces recorded for the film, the May session featured Davis' growing curiosity in modal jazz and the relationship of fewer chords and variations with melody. This was the first studio session to feature Bill Evans and Jimmy Cobb in the new sextet, recording on Davis' thirty-second birthday.

A different aesthetic was in place during the session, as Bill Evans' first rhapsodic, impressionistic chords on "On Green Dolphin Street" highlighted the mid-tempo track, while Jimmy Cobb's brush technique grooved behind Davis' trumpet solo. John Coltrane and "Cannonball" Adderley doubled and tripled-up their syncopations over Paul Chambers' transparent counterpoint, as Cobb and Evans pealed away on their instruments, sharing solos with Davis, Adderley and Coltrane. The contrast between hot melodic variations and cool, laid back swing gave the whimsical "Fran Dance" (according to Ira Gitler's liner notes, the song was named after Davis' wife Frances), the romantic "Stella by Starlight", and the jumping "Love for Sale" their elemental tension. This contrast represented Davis' transitional stage between bebop and modality; standard chords and musical variety. The sessions were also notable for featuring Coltrane's unique improvisational style, known as the sheets of sound. Coltrane employed extreme and dense improvisational, yet patterned, lines that consisted of high speed arpeggios and scale patterns played in rapid succession; hundreds of notes running from the lowest to highest registers. "Stella by Starlight" featured Evans' delicate and sparse introduction, which made Coltrane's early solo seem startling. Evans' lush and laconic solo suggested the bittersweet spell he would cast over the Kind of Blue sessions the following year.

=== Live performance ===
The live portion of the album was recorded in the Persian Room of New York's Plaza Hotel at a September jazz party given by Columbia Records to celebrate "the healthy state of jazz" at the label. Issued in full as Jazz at the Plaza in 1973, the live set featured three staples of Davis' and Coltrane's concert repertoire during their collaborating years. The sextet opened up with the standard "Straight, No Chaser", composed by Thelonious Monk. The musicians took the number at a brisk tempo, and though Jimmy Cobb lacked former drummer Philly Joe's technical flair, he and Paul Chambers remained consistent, as the horns carried into whirling solos. Evans used Adderley's solo and the song's tempo to improvise, as he scattered Bud Powell-like clusters. Journalist Lindsey Planer later called the performance "slippery and triple-jointed", and went on to state "The band plays as if Monk might have been in the room that night. This is Davis at his most muted magnificence."

The Sonny Rollins-penned "Oleo" followed along at a wild Paul Chambers bass tempo, as Evans' fluid orchestral piano technique suggested multiple key centers and modal impressions. In contrast to the high tempos and improvisation of the other live tunes, "My Funny Valentine" was stately and serene, as Coltrane and Adderley sit out, giving Evans and Davis a more meditative backdrop for sensitive soloing. Evans displayed his soft and sensitive piano style. His unique and challenging sound was one of the reasons Miles Davis had hired him following Garland's departure. The late-night languor of "My Funny Valentine", along with Bill Evans' presence and the more consistent and improving sextet, would hint at the music later featured on Davis' next album, the 1959 jazz masterpiece Kind of Blue.

== Reception and legacy ==
Professional ratings
Review scores
| Source | Rating |
|---|---|
| AllMusic | 4/5 stars |
| DownBeat | 4.5/5 stars |
| The Encyclopedia of Popular Music | 4/5 stars |
| The Penguin Guide to Jazz | 3.5/4 stars |
| The Rolling Stone Album Guide | 4/5 stars |

As parts of Jazz Track and Jazz at the Plaza, respectively, the '58 Sessions chronicled the transition from the brawny agitation of Milestones, to the cerebral tranquility of Kind of Blue. The recording sessions also became known as a stepping stone in Davis' move from bebop to modal jazz. The live side in particular was seen by critics as a glimpse at the sextet that would record Kind of Blue. The complementary and seemingly spontaneous style of performance ethic and the relationship between Davis and his musicians was fundamental for his work during these sessions and improved onto the Kind of Blue sessions.

Jazz historian and journalist Ira Gitler has considered 1958 Miles to be one of Davis' best works, while also noting that he was "very taken with the performances", alluding to the album's recordings after Gitler had listened to them. In the 1991 reissue liner notes, Gitler wrote "These prime cuts of the Miles Davis Sextet, representative of what this most influential leader and his trendsetting band of that time, were doing in that particular portion of 1958, are a most welcome addition to the collectors library." The live portion of the 1991 release recorded at the Plaza Hotel was noted by critics as an early stage of the new sextet. Music writer Nicholas Taylor later wrote of the Plaza set:

An interesting and puzzling period piece, documenting the sextet exploring a sound that would soon morph into the rich tapestry of their 1959 masterpiece ... It is the snapshot—albeit a blurred one—of a group of musicians on the verge of greatness, beginning to feel each other’s tics and idiosyncrasies, forming the bonds of a sextet that would soon alter the history of jazz forever.

— Nicholas Taylor

Prior to the live session, Miles Davis had already established a reputation as one of the jazz era's top live performers, following well-received performances at such venues as Birdland, also known as "The Jazz Corner of the World", in New York and the Newport Jazz Festival in Rhode Island during the mid-1950s. The set at the Plaza Hotel further expanded Davis' repertoire in concert venues and increased his popularity among jazz fans and writers. Even though Milestones was Davis' first use of modes and Cannonball Adderley's presence helped make the band become a more powerful sextet, these sessions introduced Bill Evans to the music of Miles Davis. The May 26 session, in particular, exposed Evans to Davis' spontaneous ability in the studio to simplify complicated musical structures. In a 1979 interview for the jazz radio station WKCR, Evans remarked on his recording experience with Davis, stating "Miles occasionally might say, 'Right here, I want this sound', and it turn out be a very key thing that changes the whole character of the [song]. For instance, on 'On Green Dolphin Street', the original changes of the chorus aren't the way [we recorded it]: the vamp changes being a major seventh up a minor third, down a half tone. That was [one when] he leaned over and said, 'I want this here.'" Evans' influence would be apparent on the Kind of Blue sessions as it was during the initial 1958 sessions. All recorded studio work by Davis from 1958 for Columbia was later reissued in the box set compilation The Complete Columbia Recordings of Miles Davis with John Coltrane. Following the implementation of his first modal compositions with the title track of Milestones and his first sessions with Bill Evans, the 1958 Sessions, Davis became satisfied with the results. This led to his preparation of an entire album based on modality, his 1959 masterwork, Kind of Blue.

== Track listing ==
=== Original 1979 Japanese release ===
Recorded at Columbia's 30th Street Studio, New York, New York, on May 26, 1958.

Side one

1. "On Green Dolphin Street" (Kaper, Washington) – 9:48
2. "Fran Dance" (Davis) – 5:48
3. "Stella by Starlight" (Young, Washington) – 4:41

Side two

1. "Love for Sale" (Porter) – 11:43
2. "Little Melonae" (McLean) – 7:22

=== Added tracks on 1991 digitally mastered '58 Sessions Featuring Stella by Starlight (Columbia Jazz Masterpieces) ===
Recorded live at The Plaza Hotel, New York, New York, on September 9, 1958.

1. "Straight, No Chaser" (Monk) – 10:57
2. "My Funny Valentine" (Rodgers, Hart) – 10:05
3. "Oleo" (Rollins) – 10:48

=== Bonus tracks of 2001 Japanese re-release ===
1. "Little Melonae" – 7:51
2. "Fran-Dance (Alternate Take)" – 5:52

== Personnel ==
=== Musicians ===
- Miles Davis – trumpet, leader
- Julian "Cannonball" Adderley – alto saxophone
- John Coltrane – tenor saxophone
- Bill Evans – piano
- Paul Chambers – bass
- Jimmy Cobb – drums

on "Little Melonae"

- Red Garland instead of Evans
- Philly Joe Jones instead of Cobb

=== Production ===
- Cal Lampley – producer (original sessions)
- Harold Chapman – engineer (original sessions)
- George Avakian – producer (March 3, 1958)
- Frank Laico – engineer (March 3, 1958)
- Larry Keyes – digital restoration, remastering (1991)
- Masamichi Okazaki (1979), Ira Gitler (1991), Mitsuru Harada (2001) – liner notes
- Masuo Ikeda – original cover art

== Release history ==
Originally released in 1979 on CBS/Sony Records in Japan, 1958 Miles has had a rather convoluted release history. The album has experienced many reissues under different titles and records labels, along with a variety of release date listings.

| Issued title | Year | Label | Format | Catalog |
|---|---|---|---|---|
| 1958 Miles | 1979 | CBS/Sony | mono, LP | 20AP 1401 |
| 1958 Miles (Miles Davis Greatest on CD 12) | 1986 | CBS/Sony | mono, digitally mastered, CD | 32DP 521 |
| '58 Sessions Featuring Stella by Starlight (Columbia Jazz Masterpieces) | 1991 | Columbia/Legacy | expanded edition, mono, CD, Musicassette | CK 47835 (467918 2 [EU]) |
| '58 Miles (Master Sound) | 1996 | Sony Records [Japan] | "stereo/mono", "DSD" mastering, CD, LP, cassette | SRCS 9102 |
| 1958 Miles (Master Sound) | 2001 | Sony Int'l | reissue with bonus tracks, CD | SRCS 9744 |
| 1958 Miles | 2009 | Sony | Blu-spec CD | SICP 20075 |
| 1958 Miles | 2013 | Sony Int'l/Legacy (Japan) | Blu-spec CD2, reissue with bonus tracks | SICP 30214 |
| Birth of the Blue | 2024 | Columbia/Sony/Analogue Productions | LP, limited edition | APJ 172 |
| Birth of the Blue | 2024 | Columbia/Sony/Analogue Productions | SACD | CAPJ 172 SA |
| Birth of the Blue | 2024 | Columbia/Sony Music Commercial Music Group | 4 FLAC files, stereo, 24-bit, 192 kHz, and 96 kHz ALAC files | — (worldwide online) |

== Bibliography ==
- Nathan Brackett, Christian Hoard (2004). The New Rolling Stone Album Guide. Completely Revised and Updated 4th Edition. Simon & Schuster. ISBN 0-7432-0169-8.
- Jack Chambers (1998) [1983]. Milestones: The Music and Times of Miles Davis. Da Capo Press. pp. 284 ff. ISBN 0-306-80849-8.
- Richard Cook, Brian Morton (2002). The Penguin Guide to Jazz on CD. Edition 6. Penguin. ISBN 0-14-051521-6.
- Miles Davis; Quincy Troupe (1990) [1989]. Miles: The Autobiography (1st pb. ed.). Touchstone (Simon & Schuster). ISBN 0-671-72582-3.
- Ira Gitler (1991). '58 Sessions Featuring Stella by Starlight album liner notes. Sony Music.
- Ashley Kahn (2001). Kind of Blue: The Making of the Miles Davis Masterpiece. foreword by Jimmy Cobb. Da Capo Press, USA. p. 82. ISBN 0-306-81067-0. OCLC 48527365. "The Making of Kind of Blue: Miles Davis and His Masterpiece bebop."
- Colin Larkin (2002). Virgin Encyclopedia of Popular Music (4 ed.). Virgin Books. ISBN 1-85227-923-0.
- Lewis Porter (1999). John Coltrane: His Life and Music. University of Michigan Press. ISBN 0-472-08643-X.
