= The Complete Columbia Recordings of Miles Davis with John Coltrane =

Box set by Miles Davis and John Coltrane
- Released: April 11, 2000
- Recorded: October 26, 1955 to March 21, 1961
- Genre: Jazz
- Length: 386:01
- Label: Columbia/Legacy
- Producers: George Avakian, Teo Macero, and Irving Townsend

The Miles Davis Series chronology
The Complete Columbia Recordings of Miles Davis with John Coltrane (2000)	(Box 2); Miles Davis & Gil Evans: The Complete Columbia Studio Recordings (1996)

Professional ratings
Review scores
Source	Rating
Allmusic	4.5/5 stars
Encyclopedia of Popular Music	4/5 stars
The Penguin Guide to Jazz Recordings	4/4 stars

The Complete Columbia Recordings of Miles Davis with John Coltrane is a box set featuring jazz musicians Miles Davis and John Coltrane. It is the first box set in a series of eight from Columbia/Legacy compiling Davis's work for Columbia Records, and includes never-before-released alternate takes, omissions of other musicians, musician comments, false starts and a first version of compositions, some of which have made it to the 50th Anniversary 2-disc CD version of Kind of Blue. Originally issued on April 11, 2000, in a limited-edition metal slipcase, it was reissued in 2004 in an oversized book format. In conjunction with Sony, Mosaic Records released the 9-LP set.

== Albums ==
Davis' and Coltrane's work together for Columbia produced three studio albums, two tracks from a fourth, and two live albums, all of which are contained in this box set:

- 'Round About Midnight (released March 4, 1957)
- Milestones (released September 2, 1958)
- Kind of Blue (released August 17, 1959)
- Someday My Prince Will Come (released December 11, 1961) (2 tracks only)
- Miles & Monk at Newport (released May 11, 1964) (A-side only), reissued as Miles Davis at Newport 1958 in 2001
- Jazz at the Plaza (released September 28, 1973)

== Track listing ==
Disc 1
No.	Title	Original release	Length
1.	"Two Bass Hit (Alternate Take)"	Previously unreleased	3:21
2.	"Two Bass Hit (Take 2)"	Circle in the Round	3:44
3.	"Ah-Leu-Cha (Alternate Take)"	Previously unreleased	5:51
4.	"Ah-Leu-Cha"	Round About Midnight	5:53
5.	"Ah-Leu-Cha (Take 5)"	Previously unreleased	5:25
6.	"Little Melonae"	Basic Miles	7:22
7.	"Budo (Alternate Take)"	The Columbia Years 1955–1985	5:02
8.	"Budo"	Jazz Omnibus (various artist compilation)	4:17
9.	"Dear Old Stockholm"	Round About Midnight	7:51
10.	"Bye Bye Blackbird (Alternate Take)"	Previously unreleased	7:50
11.	"Bye Bye Blackbird"	Round About Midnight	7:56
12.	"Tadd's Delight"	Round About Midnight	4:28
13.	"Tadd's Delight (Alternate Take)"	Previously unreleased	4:18

Disc 2
No.	Title	...	Length
1.	"Dear Old Stockholm (Alternate Take)"	Previously unreleased	6:42
2.	"All of You (Alternate Take)"	Previously unreleased	7:31
3.	"All of You"	Round About Midnight	7:03
4.	"Sweet Sue, Just You (First Version)"	Previously unreleased	4:23
5.	"Sweet Sue, Just You (False Start with Discussion Between Leonard Bernstein & Miles Davis)"	Previously unreleased	1:58
6.	"Sweet Sue, Just You (Alternate Take)"	Previously unreleased	3:32
7.	"Sweet Sue, Just You"	What Is Jazz	3:41
8.	"Miles Davis Comments"	Previously unreleased	0:30
9.	"'Round Midnight"	Round About Midnight	5:57
10.	"Two Bass Hit (Alternate Take)"	Previously unreleased	4:32
11.	"Two Bass Hit"	Milestones	5:13
12.	"Billy Boy"	Milestones	7:12
13.	"Straight No Chaser (Alternate Take)"	Previously unreleased	10:27

Disc 3
No.	Title	...	Length
1.	"Straight No Chaser"	Milestones	10:37
2.	"Milestones (Alternate Take)"	Previously unreleased	6:01
3.	"Milestones"	Milestones	5:44
4.	"Sid's Ahead"	Milestones	13:02
5.	"Little Melonae (omits Adderley)"	Previously unreleased	7:55
6.	"Dr. Jekyll"	Milestones	5:49
7.	"On Green Dolphin Street"	Jazz Track	9:50
8.	"Fran-Dance (Alternate Take)"	Previously unreleased	5:52
9.	"Fran-Dance"	Jazz Track	5:49
10.	"Stella by Starlight"	Jazz Track	4:43

Disc 4
No.	Title	...	Length
1.	"Love for Sale"	1958 Miles	11:49
2.	"Freddie Freeloader (false start)"	Previously unreleased	1:27
3.	"Freddie Freeloader"	Kind of Blue	9:48
4.	"So What"	Kind of Blue	9:23
5.	"Blue in Green"	Kind of Blue	5:38
6.	"Flamenco Sketches (Alternate Take)"	Previously unreleased	9:33
7.	"Miles Davis Comments"	Previously unreleased	0:44
8.	"Flamenco Sketches"	Kind of Blue	9:27
9.	"All Blues"	Kind of Blue	11:32

Disc 5
No.	Title	...	Length
1.	"Someday My Prince Will Come"	Someday My Prince Will Come	9:05
2.	"Teo"	Someday My Prince Will Come	9:36
3.	"Introduction by Willis Conover"	Miles Davis at Newport 1958	2:15
4.	"Ah-Leu-Cha"	Miles Davis at Newport 1958	5:52
5.	"Straight No Chaser"	Miles Davis at Newport 1958	8:47
6.	"Fran-Dance"	Miles Davis at Newport 1958	7:13
7.	"Two Bass Hit"	Miles Davis at Newport 1958	4:10
8.	"Bye Bye Blackbird"	Miles Davis at Newport 1958	9:10
9.	"The Theme"	Miles Davis at Newport 1958	2:48

Disc 6
No.	Title	...	Length
1.	"If I Were a Bell"	Jazz at the Plaza	8:31
2.	"Oleo"	Jazz at the Plaza	10:38
3.	"My Funny Valentine"	Jazz at the Plaza	10:18
4.	"Straight No Chaser"	Jazz at the Plaza	10:56

== Personnel ==
Recorded between October 26, 1955, and March 21, 1961, in New York City (except disk 5, tracks 3–9, recorded in Newport, RI).

- Miles Davis – trumpet
- John Coltrane – tenor saxophone
- Hank Mobley – tenor saxophone (Disc 5: track 1)
- Cannonball Adderley – alto saxophone (Disc 2: tracks 10–13; Disc 3; Disc 4: tracks 1, 6–9; Disc 5: tracks 3–9; Disc 6)
- Red Garland – piano (Disc 1; Disc 2; Disc 3: tracks 1–6)
- Bill Evans – piano (Disc 3: tracks 7–10; Disk 4: track 1, 4–9; Disc 5: tracks 3–9; Disc 6)
- Wynton Kelly – piano (Disc 4: tracks 2–3; Disc 5: tracks 1–2)
- Paul Chambers – bass
- Philly Joe Jones – drums (Disc 1; Disc 2; Disc 3: tracks 1–6)
- Jimmy Cobb – drums (Disc 3: tracks 7–10; Disk 4; Disc 5; Disc 6)
