= Super Hits (Miles Davis album) =

- Original cover

Greatest hits album by Miles Davis
- Released: April 17, 2001
- Recorded: 1956–1985
- Genre: Jazz
- Length: 48:43
- Label: Columbia/Legacy
- Producer: Teo Macero and Irving Townsend, Teo Macero, Miles Davis and Robert Irving III, Teo Macero and Cal Lampley, Irving Townsend, Gil Evans and Miles Davis, and Miles Davis and Robert Irving III
- Compiler: Bob Belden

Miles Davis compilations chronology
At Newport 1958 (2001)	Super Hits (2001)	The Essential Miles Davis (2001)

Re-release cover

Professional ratings
Review scores
Source	Rating
Allmusic	3/5 stars

Super Hits is a greatest hits album from Miles Davis. Released in 2001, it reached #22 on Billboard's Jazz Albums chart.

== Track listing ==
1. "So What" (Davis) – 9:22 (from Kind of Blue)
2. "Someday My Prince Will Come" (Frank Churchill and Larry Morey) – 9:02 (from Someday My Prince Will Come)
3. "Time After Time" (Cyndi Lauper and Rob Hyman) – 3:39 (from You're Under Arrest)
4. "Summertime" (George Gershwin, Ira Gershwin, and DuBose Heyward) – 3:17 (from Porgy and Bess)
5. "Eighty-One" (Ron Carter and Davis) – 6:21 (from E.S.P.)
6. "Bye Bye Blackbird" (Ray Henderson) – 7:54 (from 'Round About Midnight)
7. "New Rhumba" (Ahmad Jamal) – 4:37 (from Miles Ahead)
8. "Human Nature" (Steve Porcaro and John Bettis) – 4:31 (from You're Under Arrest)

== Personnel ==
"So What"

- Cannonball Adderley – alto saxophone
- Paul Chambers – double bass
- Jimmy Cobb – drum kit
- John Coltrane – tenor saxophone
- Miles Davis – trumpet, band leader
- Bill Evans – piano

"Someday My Prince Will Come"

- Paul Chambers – double bass
- Jimmy Cobb – drum kit
- John Coltrane – tenor saxophone
- Miles Davis – trumpet, band leader
- Wynton Kelly – piano
- Hank Mobley – tenor saxophone

"Time After Time"

- Bob Berg – soprano saxophone
- Miles Davis – trumpet
- Al Foster – drums
- Robert Irving III – synthesizer
- Darryl Jones – bass
- John McLaughlin – guitar
- John Scofield – guitar

"Summertime"

- Cannonball Adderley – alto saxophone
- Danny Bank – alto flute, bass clarinet
- Bill Barber – tuba
- Phil Bodner – flute, alto flute, clarinet
- Joe Bennett – trombone
- Paul Chambers – bass
- Jimmy Cleveland – trombone
- Jimmy Cobb – drum kit
- Johnny Coles – trumpet
- Miles Davis – trumpet, flugelhorn
- Gil Evans – arrangement and conducting
- Bernie Glow – trumpet
- Dick Hixon – trombone
- Louis Mucci – trumpet
- Romeo Penque – flute, alto flute, clarinet
- Frank Rehak – trombone
- Jerome Richardson – flute, alto flute, clarinet
- Ernie Royal – trumpet
- Willie Ruff – horn
- Gunther Schuller – horn
- Julius Watkins – horn

"Eighty-One"

- Ron Carter – double bass
- Miles Davis – trumpet
- Herbie Hancock – piano
- Wayne Shorter – tenor saxophone
- Tony Williams – drum kit

"Bye Bye Blackbird"

- Paul Chambers – bass
- John Coltrane – tenor saxophone
- Miles Davis – trumpet
- Red Garland – piano
- Philly Joe Jones – drum kit

"New Rhumba"

- Danny Bank – bass clarinet
- Bill Barber – tuba
- Joe Bennett – trombone
- John Carisi – trumpet
- Paul Chambers – bass
- Jimmy Cleveland – trombone
- Sid Cooper – flute, clarinet
- Miles Davis – flugelhorn
- Bernie Glow – trumpet
- Taft Jordan – trumpet
- Lee Konitz – alto saxophone
- Tom Mitchell – bass trombone
- Tony Miranda – horn
- Louis Mucci – trumpet
- Romeo Penque – flute, clarinet
- Frank Rehak – trombone
- Ernie Royal – trumpet
- Willie Ruff – horn
- Art Taylor – drum kit

"Human Nature"

- Bob Berg – soprano sax
- Miles Davis – trumpet
- Al Foster – drums
- Robert Irving III – synthesizer
- Darryl Jones – bass
- John McLaughlin – guitar
- John Scofield – guitar

== Release history ==
Region	Date	Label	Format	Catalog
United States	April 17, 2001	Sony	Compact Disc	85186
United States	April 17, 2001	Sony	Cassette tape	85186
United States	April 17, 2001	Sbme Special MKTS.	CD	705375
United States	2007	Sony BMG	CD	705375
