= Miles Davis at Newport 1955–1975: The Bootleg Series Vol. 4 =

Live album by Miles Davis
- Released: July 17, 2015
- Recorded: July 17, 1955; July 3, 1958; July 4, 1966; July 2, 1967; July 5, 1969; October 22, 1971; November 1, 1973; July 1, 1975
- Venues: Newport Jazz Festival; Newport, Rhode Island; Dietikon, Switzerland (1971); Berlin, West Germany (1973); Avery Fisher Hall, New York City (1975)
- Genres: Jazz; hard bop; post-bop; jazz fusion; funk
- Length: 295:38
- Label: Columbia/Legacy
- Producer: George Wein

Miles Davis chronology
Miles at the Fillmore – Miles Davis 1970: The Bootleg Series Vol. 3 (2014)	Miles Davis at Newport 1955–1975: The Bootleg Series Vol. 4 (2015)	Miles Davis Quintet: Freedom Jazz Dance: The Bootleg Series, Vol. 5 (2016)

Miles Davis live chronology
Birdland 1951 (1951)	Miles Davis at Newport 1955–1975: The Bootleg Series Vol. 4 (1955)	Miles & Monk at Newport (1958)

Miles Davis at Newport 1955–1975: The Bootleg Series Vol. 4 is a four-CD album compiling five of Miles Davis's performances at the Newport Jazz Festival in Newport, Rhode Island and two European concerts branded under the Festival moniker with one additional track recorded in New York City.

The first disc contains Davis's debut appearance at the 1955 festival and his headlining performance from 1958, the later of which was originally released in part as one side of the split-LP by Columbia in 1964 as Miles & Monk at Newport and given its first complete release as part of The Complete Columbia Recordings of Miles Davis with John Coltrane box set in 1999 before being released individually as Miles Davis at Newport 1958 in 2001. The second disc contains previously unreleased performances from the 1966 and 1967 festivals. The third disc contains the Newport Festival concert from 1969 which was released as part of Bitches Brew Live in 2011, a complete previously unreleased concert from Berlin in 1973 and one performance from New York in 1975. The fourth CD contains a complete previously unreleased performance from Switzerland in 1971.

== Reception ==
Professional ratings
Aggregate scores
Source	Rating
Metacritic	92/100
Review scores
Source	Rating
AllMusic	4/5 stars
PopMatters	10/10 stars
The Guardian	4/5 stars
The Observer	5/5 stars

Miles Davis at Newport 1955–1975: The Bootleg Series Vol. 4 received positive reviews on release. At Metacritic, which assigns a normalised rating out of 100 to reviews from mainstream critics, the album has received a score of 92, based on 14 reviews which is categorised as universal acclaim. Matt Collar's review on AllMusic stated "Miles Davis at Newport details the association between Davis and the festival, each performance serendipitously documenting his ever-morphing sound, from swinging cool jazz in the '50s to aggressive, free jazz-influenced modal bop in the '60s and finally to funky, acid-soaked fusion in the '70s." PopMatters's John Paul gave the album 10 out of 10 saying "Perhaps no other recording better illustrates how Miles Davis bridged the gap between jazz's old guard and its younger visionaries." The Observer's Dave Gelly said "Summer is traditionally the season for unearthing treasures from the jazz archives, and this is a real prize."

== Track listing ==
All tracks are written by Miles Davis except as noted.

Disc one
No.	Title	Writer(s)	Date recorded	Length
1.	"Spoken Introductions by Duke Ellington and Gerry Mulligan"		July 17, 1955	1:27
2.	"Hackensack"	Thelonious Monk	July 17, 1955	8:02
3.	"'Round Midnight"	Monk	July 17, 1955	6:11
4.	"Now's the Time"	Charlie Parker	July 17, 1955	8:48
5.	"Introduction by Willis Connover"		July 3, 1958	2:16
6.	"Ah-Leu-Cha"	Parker	July 3, 1958	5:52
7.	"Straight, No Chaser"	Monk	July 3, 1958	8:47
8.	"Fran-Dance"		July 3, 1958	7:13
9.	"Two Bass Hit"	Dizzy Gillespie; John Lewis	July 3, 1958	4:10
10.	"Bye Bye Blackbird"	Ray Henderson; Mort Dixon	July 3, 1958	9:10
11.	"The Theme"		July 3, 1958	2:49
Total length:				1:04:47

Disc two
No.	Title	Writer(s)	Date recorded	Length
1.	"Gingerbread Boy"	Jimmy Heath	July 4, 1966	8:29
2.	"All Blues"		July 4, 1966	10:27
3.	"Stella by Starlight"	Victor Young; Ned Washington	July 4, 1966	7:58
4.	"R.J."	Ron Carter	July 4, 1966	6:20
5.	"Seven Steps to Heaven"	Miles Davis; Victor Feldman	July 4, 1966	4:45
6.	"The Theme/Closing Announcement by Leonard Feather"		July 4, 1966	2:18
7.	"Spoken Introduction by Del Shields"		July 2, 1967	0:38
8.	"Gingerbread Boy"	Heath	July 2, 1967	8:42
9.	"Footprints"	Wayne Shorter	July 2, 1967	7:53
10.	"'Round Midnight"	Monk	July 2, 1967	6:41
11.	"So What"		July 2, 1967	8:18
12.	"The Theme"/"Closing Announcement by Del Shields"		July 2, 1967	0:19
Total length:				1:12:49

Disc three
No.	Title	Writer(s)	Date recorded	Length
1.	"Miles Runs the Voodoo Down"		July 5, 1969	10:27
2.	"Sanctuary"	Shorter	July 5, 1969	3:52
3.	"It's About That Time/The Theme"		July 5, 1969	9:48
4.	"Band Warming Up/Voice Over Introduction"		November 1, 1973	0:36
5.	"Turnaroundphrase"		November 1, 1973	10:57
6.	"Tune in 5"		November 1, 1973	4:12
7.	"Ife"		November 1, 1973	13:54
8.	"Untitled Original"		November 1, 1973	11:31
9.	"Tune in 5 (Reprise)"		November 1, 1973	6:07
10.	"Mtume"		July 1, 1975	6:57
Total length:				1:18:21

Disc four
No.	Title	Writer(s)	Date recorded	Length
1.	"Directions"	Joe Zawinul	October 22, 1971	13:05
2.	"What I Say"		October 22, 1971	10:43
3.	"Sanctuary"		October 22, 1971	3:42
4.	"It's About That Time"		October 22, 1971	13:21
5.	"Bitches Brew"		October 22, 1971	11:55
6.	"Funky Tonk"		October 22, 1971	25:43
7.	"Sanctuary (Reprise)"	Shorter	October 22, 1971	1:15
Total length:				1:19:45

== Personnel ==
=== July 15, 1955 — Newport Jazz Festival, Festival Field, Newport, RI ===
All-Star Jam Session:

- Miles Davis – trumpet
- Zoot Sims – tenor saxophone
- Gerry Mulligan – baritone saxophone
- Thelonious Monk – piano
- Percy Heath – bass
- Connie Kay – drums

=== July 3, 1958 — Newport Jazz Festival, Festival Field, Newport, RI ===
- Miles Davis – trumpet
- Cannonball Adderley – alto saxophone
- John Coltrane – tenor saxophone
- Bill Evans – piano
- Paul Chambers – bass
- Jimmy Cobb – drums

=== July 4, 1966 & July 2, 1967 — Newport Jazz Festival, Festival Field, Newport, RI ===
- Miles Davis – trumpet
- Wayne Shorter – tenor saxophone
- Herbie Hancock – piano
- Ron Carter – bass
- Tony Williams – drums

=== July 5, 1969 — Newport Jazz Festival, Festival Field, Newport, RI ===
- Miles Davis – trumpet
- Chick Corea – electric piano
- Dave Holland – bass
- Jack DeJohnette – drums

=== October 22, 1971 — Newport Jazz Festival in Europe, Neue Stadthalle, Dietikon, Switzerland ===
- Miles Davis – electric trumpet with wah-wah
- Gary Bartz – soprano saxophone, alto saxophone
- Keith Jarrett – electric piano, organ
- Michael Henderson – electric bass
- Leon "Ndugu" Chancler – drums
- Don Alias – percussion
- James Mtume Foreman – percussion

=== November 1, 1973 — Newport Jazz Festival in Europe, Berlin Philharmonie, Berlin, Germany ===
- Miles Davis – electric trumpet with wah-wah, organ
- Dave Liebman – soprano saxophone, tenor saxophone, flute
- Pete Cosey – electric guitar, percussion
- Reggie Lucas – electric guitar
- Michael Henderson – electric bass
- Al Foster – drums
- James Mtume Foreman – percussion

=== July 1, 1975 — Newport Jazz Festival – New York, Avery Fisher Hall, New York, NY ===
- Miles Davis – electric trumpet with wah-wah, organ
- Sam Morrison – tenor saxophone
- Pete Cosey – electric guitar, percussion
- Reggie Lucas – electric guitar
- Michael Henderson – electric bass
- Al Foster – drums
- James Mtume Foreman – percussion
