= The Essential Miles Davis =

Greatest hits album by Miles Davis
- Released: May 15, 2001
- Recorded: 1945–1986
- Genre: Jazz
- Length: 149:13 (2 disc set)
- Label: Sony/Columbia/Legacy
- Producer: Michael Cuscuna, Bob Belden, Steve Berkowitz and Seth Rothstein for Columbia Legacy label of Sony Entertainment

Miles Davis chronology
| Super Hits (2001) | The Essential Miles Davis (2001) | Live at the Fillmore East, March 7, 1970: It's About That Time (2001) |

Professional ratings
Review scores
| Source | Rating |
|---|---|
| AllMusic | 4.5/5 stars |
| The Penguin Guide to Jazz Recordings | 4/4 stars |

The Essential Miles Davis is a 2-CD compilation album by Miles Davis released by Columbia Legacy on May 15, 2001. It belongs to Sony Music Entertainment's "The Essential" series, not to the series "Essentials", established by WEA International, and was released as part of Sony's Miles 75 Anniversary program. In 2008, The Essential Miles Davis 3.0 was released as a limited edition album featuring a bonus third disc that added five more songs to the original track list.

== Track listing ==
=== CD1 ===
1. "Now's the Time" – C. Parker
2. "Jeru" – G. Mulligan
3. "Compulsion" – M. Davis
4. "Tempus Fugit" – B. Powell
5. "Walkin'" – Richard Carpenter
6. "Round Midnight" – T. Monk - B. Hanighen - C. Williams
7. "Bye Bye Blackbird" – M. Dixon - R. Henderson
8. "New Rhumba" – A. Jamal
9. "Generique" – M. Davis
10. "Summertime" – G. Gershwin - I. Gershwin - D. Heyward
11. "So What" – M. Davis
12. "The Pan Piper" – Gil Evans
13. "Someday My Prince Will Come" – F.E. Churchill - L. Morey

=== CD2 ===
1. "My Funny Valentine (Live)" – R. Rodgers - L. Hart
2. "E.S.P." – Miles Davis - W. Shorter
3. "Nefertiti" – W. Shorter
4. "Petits Machins (Little Stuff)" – Miles Davis - Gil Evans
5. "Miles Runs the Voodoo Down" – Miles Davis
6. "Little Church" – H. Pascoal
7. "Black Satin" – Miles Davis
8. "Jean Pierre (Live)" – Miles Davis
9. "Time After Time" – C. Lauper - R. Hyman
10. "Portia" – M. Miller

=== CD3 (Limited Edition) ===
1. "Stella by Starlight" – V. Young - N. Washington
2. "Milestones" – M. Davis
3. "Seven Steps to Heaven" – M. Davis - V. Feldman
4. "Footprints" – W. Shorter
5. "In a Silent Way" – J. Zawinul

== Personnel ==
- Miles Davis – Trumpet
- Charlie Parker – Alto & Tenor Sax
- Julian 'Cannonball' Adderley – Alto Sax
- Lee Konitz – Alto Sax
- Sonny Rollins – Tenor Sax
- Jimmy Heath – Tenor Sax
- Lucky Thompson – Tenor Sax
- John Coltrane – Tenor Sax
- Barney Wilen – Tenor Sax
- Hank Mobley – Tenor Sax
- George Coleman – Tenor Sax
- Wayne Shorter – Tenor Sax
- Carlos Garnett – Soprano Sax
- Bill Evans (saxophonist) – Soprano Sax
- Dizzie Gillespie – Piano
- Walter Bishop – Piano
- Gil Coggins – Piano
- Horace Silver – Piano
- Red Garland – Piano
- Rene Urtreger – Piano
- Bill Evans – Piano
- Wynton Kelly – Piano
- Herbie Hancock – Piano
- Al Haig – Piano
- Chick Corea – Electric Piano
- Larry Young – Electric Piano
- Keith Jarrett – Organ
- Cedric Lawson – Keyboards
- Robert Irving III – Keyboards
- Curly Russell – Bass
- Percy Heath – Bass
- Paul Chambers – Bass
- Pierre Michelot – Bass
- Ron Carter – Bass
- Harvey Brooks – Electric Bass
- Dave Holland – Electric Bass
- Michael Henderson – Electric Bass
- Marcus Miller – Electric Bass, other instr.
- Darryl Jones – Electric Bass
- Max Roach – Drums
- Philly Joe Jones – Drums
- Art Blakey – Drums
- Kenny Clarke – Drums
- Jimmy Cobb – Drums
- Tony Williams – Drums
- Jack DeJohnette – Drums
- Billy Hart – Drums
- Don Alias – Drums, Conga
- Al Foster – Drums
- Lenny White – Percussion
- Jumma Santos – Percussion
- Airto Moreira – Percussion
- James 'Mtume' Foreman – Percussion
- Mino Cinelu – Percussion
- Steve Thornton – Percussion
- Paulinho Da Costa – Percussion
- Kai Winding – Trombone
- J.J. Johnson – Trombone
- Junior Collins – Flugelhorn
- Bill Barber – Tuba
- Gerry Mulligan – Baritone Sax, Arrangements
- Joe Shulman – Bass
- Bennie Maupin – Bass Clarinet
- John McLaughlin – Guitar
- Reggie Lucas – Guitar
- Mike Stern – Guitar
- John Scofield – Guitar
- Kahlil Balakrishna – Electric Sitar
- Badal Roy – Tabla
- Hermeto Pascoal – Whistling

== Charts ==
| Chart (2002) | Peak position |
|---|---|
| Australian Albums (ARIA Charts) | 73 |
