= Basic Miles: The Classic Performances of Miles Davis =

Compilation album by Miles Davis
- Released: 1973
- Recorded: 1955–1962
- Genre: Jazz, jazz fusion
- Length: 48:39
- Label: Columbia
- Producer: George Avakian, Teo Macero

Basic Miles: The Classic Performances of Miles Davis is a compilation album by American jazz musician Miles Davis, released in 1973 by Columbia Records and recorded from 1955 through 1962.

== Track listing ==
Track listing
No.	Title	Length
1.	"Budo"	4:16
2.	"Stella By Starlight"	4:50
3.	"Sweet Sue, Just You"	3:40
4.	"Little Melonae"	7:21
5.	"Miles Ahead"	3:35
6.	"On Green Dolphin Street"	9:48
7.	"Round Midnight"	5:54
8.	"Fran-Dance (Put Your Little Foot Right Out)"	7:09
9.	"Devil May Care"	3:26

== Personnel ==
- Teo Macero – producer
- George Avakian – producer
- Russ Payne – mixer

"Budo" and "Little Melonae", recorded October 27, 1955. ("Budo" previously released in Jazz Omnibus, 1957. "Little Melonae" previously unreleased.)

- Miles Davis – trumpet
- John Coltrane – tenor saxophone
- Red Garland – piano
- Paul Chambers – bass
- Philly Joe Jones – drums

"Sweet Sue, Just You" and "'Round Midnight", recorded September 10, 1956. ("Sweet Sue, Just You" previously released in What is Jazz?, 1956. "'Round Midnight" previously released in 'Round About Midnight, 1957.)

- Miles Davis – trumpet
- John Coltrane – tenor saxophone
- Red Garland – piano
- Paul Chambers – bass
- Philly Joe Jones – drums

"Miles Ahead", recorded May 10, 1957. (previously released in Miles Ahead, 1957.)

- Miles Davis – flugelhorn
- Bernie Glow – tenor saxophone
- Ernie Royal – trumpet
- John Carisi – trumpet
- Louis Mucci – trumpet
- Taft Jordan – trumpet
- Frank Rehak – trombone
- Jimmy Cleveland – trombone
- Joe Bennett – trombone
- Tom Mitchell – bass trombone
- Jimmy Buffington – french horn
- Tony Miranda – french horn
- Willie Ruff – french horn
- Bill Barber – tuba
- Lee Konitz – alto saxophone
- Danny Bank – bass clarinet
- Romeo Penque – clarinet, flute
- Sid Cooper – clarinet, flute
- Edwin Caine – clarinet, flute
- Paul Chambers – bass
- Art Taylor – drums

"Stella By Starlight" and "On Green Dolphin Street", recorded May 26, 1958. (both previously released in Jazz Track, 1959.)

- Miles Davis – trumpet
- John Coltrane – tenor saxophone
- Julian "Cannonball" Adderley – alto saxophone
- Bill Evans – piano
- Paul Chambers – bass
- Jimmy Cobb – drums

"Fran-Dance (Put Your Little Foot Right Out)", recorded July 3, 1958. (previously released in Miles & Monk at Newport, 1964.)

- Miles Davis – trumpet
- John Coltrane – tenor saxophone
- Julian "Cannonball" Adderley – alto saxophone
- Wynton Kelly – piano
- Paul Chambers – bass
- Jimmy Cobb – drums

"Devil May Care", recorded August 23, 1962. (previously released in The Giants of Jazz, 1963.)

- Miles Davis – trumpet
- Frank Rehak – trombone
- Wayne Shorter – tenor saxophone
- Paul Chambers – bass
- Jimmy Cobb – drums
- William "Willie Bobo" Correa – bongos

== Charting and reviews ==
=== Reviews ===
Professional ratings
Review scores
Source	Rating
Allmusic	3/5 stars

=== Charting history ===
Chart (1973)	Peak position
US Billboard 200	189
US Top Jazz Albums (Billboard)	21
