= Freddie Freeloader =

1959 composition by Miles Davis

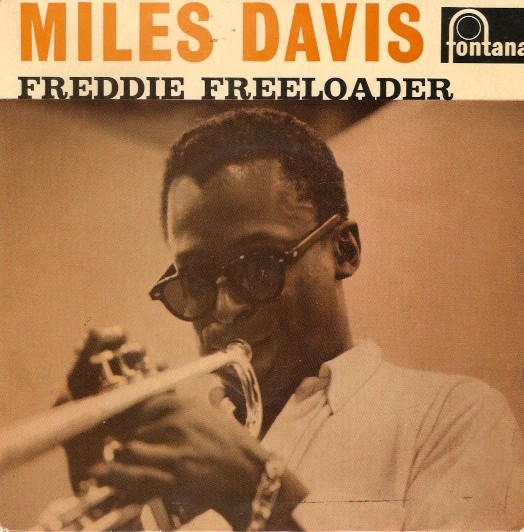

Composition by Miles Davis

from the album Kind of Blue
- Released: August 17, 1959
- Recorded: March 2, 1959
- Genre: Modal jazz
- Length: 9:46
- Label: Columbia
- Composer: Miles Davis
- Producer: Irving Townsend

Official audio
- "Freddie Freeloader" on YouTube

"Freddie Freeloader" is a composition by Miles Davis and is the second track on his 1959 album Kind of Blue. The piece takes the form of a twelve-bar blues in B♭, but the chord over the final two bars of each chorus is an A♭7, not the traditional B♭7 followed by either F7 for a turnaround or some variation of B♭7 for an ending.

Davis employed Wynton Kelly as the pianist for this track in place of Bill Evans, as Kelly was something of a blues specialist. The solos are by Kelly, Miles Davis, John Coltrane, Cannonball Adderley and Paul Chambers.

The origin of the title is disputed. Jon Hendricks and Kind of Blue chronicler Ashley Kahn claim that Fred Tolbert was a Philadelphia bartender whose business card read "Freddie the Freeloader". According to the documentary Kind of Blue: Made in Heaven, and an anecdote from the jazz pianist Monty Alexander, the piece was named after an individual named Freddie who would frequently try to see the music Davis and others performed without paying (thus freeloading). The name may have also been inspired by Red Skelton’s most famous character, "Freddie the Freeloader" the hobo clown. Jon Hendricks, on the eponymous record, added vocalese-style lyrics to all of the original solos (himself singing Coltrane's part), reimagining it as a story about a barman who allowed jazz musicians to freeload at his bar at the expense of other patrons.

== Personnel ==
(as per the liner notes)

- Miles Davis – trumpet
- Julian "Cannonball" Adderley – alto saxophone
- John Coltrane – tenor saxophone
- Wynton Kelly – piano
- Paul Chambers – double bass
- Jimmy Cobb – drums
