= Ascenseur pour l'échafaud (soundtrack) =

Soundtrack album by Miles Davis
- Released: 1958
- Recorded: December 4 and 5, 1957
- Studios: Le Poste Parisien Studio, Paris
- Genre: Modal jazz
- Length: 25:38 (original LP); 71:18 (CD)
- Label: Fontana

Miles Davis chronology
Relaxin' with the Miles Davis Quintet (1958)	Ascenseur pour l'échafaud (1958)	Milestones (1958)

Ascenseur pour l'échafaud is an album by the jazz musician Miles Davis. It was recorded at Le Poste Parisien Studio in Paris on December 4 and 5, 1957. The album features the musical cues for the 1958 Louis Malle film Elevator to the Gallows (Ascenseur pour l'échafaud).

== Background ==
Jean-Paul Rappeneau, a jazz fan and Malle's assistant at the time, suggested asking Miles Davis to create the film's soundtrack – possibly inspired by the Modern Jazz Quartet's recording for Roger Vadim's Sait-on jamais (lit. 'Does One Ever Know', released as No Sun in Venice), released a few months earlier in 1957.

Davis was booked to perform at the Club Saint-Germain in Paris during November 1957. Rappeneau introduced him to Malle, and Davis agreed to record the music after attending a private screening. On December 4, he brought his four sidemen to the recording studio without having had them prepare anything. Davis only gave the musicians a few rudimentary harmonic sequences he had assembled in his hotel room, and, once the plot was explained, the band improvised without any precomposed theme, while edited loops of the musically relevant film sequences were projected in the background.

== Release and reception ==
Professional ratings
Review scores
Source	Rating
AllMusic	4.5/5 stars
Los Angeles Times	4/5 stars
Mojo	favorable
The Penguin Guide to Jazz Recordings	4/4 stars

The record was first released in France in 1958 through Fontana Records. It became available in the U.S. via import by September 1959. It was subsequently released in the U.S. by Columbia Records, as side one of the album Jazz Track, with the second side filled by three new tracks recorded with his regular sextet (later to be re-released on the 1958 Miles CD). Jazz Track received a 1960 Grammy nomination for Best Jazz Performance, Solo or Small Group. The CD edition, released internationally by Fontana/PolyGram in the late '80s, contains the original soundtrack material, versions of the original album tracks without the reverb that was added to the initial release, and several previously unreleased alternate takes.

In the opinion of Romina Daniele, the musical mood and characteristics of the soundtrack immediately preceded and introduced Miles Davis's subsequent records Milestones (1958) and Kind of Blue (1959).

== Track listings ==
=== Original release (10″ LP) ===
All tracks are written by Miles Davis.

Side one
No.	Title	Length
1.	"Générique"	2:45
2.	"L'assassinat de Carala"	2:10
3.	"Sur l'autoroute"	2:15
4.	"Julien dans l'ascenseur"	2:07
5.	"Florence sur les Champs Élysées"	2:50

Side two
No.	Title	Length
1.	"Dîner au motel"	3:58
2.	"Évasion de Julien"	0:53
3.	"Visite du vigile"	2:00
4.	"Au bar du Petit Bac"	2:50
5.	"Chez le photographe du motel"	3:50

=== CD ===
No.	Title	Length
1.	"Nuit sur les Champs-Élysées (take 1)"	2:25
2.	"Nuit sur les Champs-Élysées (take 2)"	5:20
3.	"Nuit sur les Champs-Élysées (take 3)"	2:47
4.	"Nuit sur les Champs-Élysées (take 4)"	2:59
5.	"Assassinat (take 1)"	2:02
6.	"Assassinat (take 2)"	2:10
7.	"Assassinat (take 3)"	2:10
8.	"Motel"	3:56
9.	"Final (take 1)"	3:05
10.	"Final (take 2)"	3:00
11.	"Final (take 3)"	4:04
12.	"Ascenseur"	1:57
13.	"Le Petit Bal (take 1)"	2:40
14.	"Le Petit Bal (take 2)"	2:53
15.	"Séquence Voiture (take 1)"	2:56
16.	"Séquence Voiture (take 2)"	2:16
17.	"Générique"	2:45
18.	"L' Assassinat de Carala"	2:10
19.	"Sur L'Autoroute"	2:15
20.	"Julien dans L'Ascenseur"	2:07
21.	"Florence sur les Champs Élysées"	2:50
22.	"Dîner au Motel"	3:58
23.	"Évasion de Julien"	0:53
24.	"Visite du Vigile"	2:00
25.	"Au Bar du Petit Bac"	2:50
26.	"Chez le Photographe du Motel"	3:50

- Note: The track listing above refers to the currently available CD version. The original soundtrack to the film, as mixed and edited (with additional reverb) in 1958, and used for the screen, can be heard in tracks 17 to 26.

== Personnel ==
- Miles Davis – trumpet
- Barney Wilen – tenor saxophone (1–4, 13–17, 19, 21, 25)
- René Urtreger – piano (1–4, 6–7, 9–11, 13–14, 17–18, 20–21, 25–26)
- Pierre Michelot – bass
- Kenny Clarke – drums

== Charts ==
Chart performance for Ascenseur pour l'échafaud
Chart (2020–2026)	Peak position
Greek Albums (IFPI)	70
UK Jazz & Blues Albums (Official Charts)	4
UK Soundtrack Albums (Official Charts)	4
