= At Newport 1958 =

Miles Davis at Newport 1958

Live album by Miles Davis
- Released: April 17, 2001
- Recorded: July 3, 1958
- Venue: Newport Jazz Festival; Newport, Rhode Island
- Genre: Jazz
- Length: 40:20
- Label: Columbia/Legacy
- Producer: George Avakian, Bob Belden, Michael Cuscuna

Miles Davis chronology
Miles Davis at Newport 1958 (2001)	Super Hits (2001)

Miles Davis live chronology
Miles & Monk at Newport (1958)	Miles Davis at Newport 1958 (1958)	Jazz at the Plaza Vol. I (1958)

Professional ratings
Review scores
Source	Rating
AllMusic	4/5 stars

At Newport 1958 is a live album by the jazz musician Miles Davis featuring the Miles Davis Sextet's complete performance recorded at the Newport Jazz Festival in 1958. The album was first released as a single CD in 2001 though four tracks had previously been released in part as one side of the LP Miles & Monk at Newport (Columbia, 1964). The entire concert was given its first complete release as part of The Complete Columbia Recordings of Miles Davis with John Coltrane box set in 1999, and all tracks were included on the 2015 compilation Miles Davis at Newport 1955-1975: The Bootleg Series Vol. 4.

== Track listing ==
1. Introduction by Willis Conover - 2:16
2. "Ah-Leu-Cha" (Charlie Parker) - 5:53
3. "Straight, No Chaser" (Thelonious Monk) - 8:48
4. "Fran-Dance" (Miles Davis) - 7:14
5. "Two Bass Hit" (John Lewis, Dizzy Gillespie) - 4:11
6. "Bye Bye Blackbird" (Mort Dixon, Ray Henderson) - 9:11
7. "The Theme" (Davis) - 2:49

Tracks 2–5 originally issued on Miles & Monk at Newport (1964); tracks 6 and 7 originally issued on Newport Jazz Festival: Live (1982). John Coltrane appears courtesy of Prestige Records.

== Personnel ==
- Miles Davis — trumpet
- Cannonball Adderley — alto saxophone
- John Coltrane — tenor saxophone
- Bill Evans — piano
- Paul Chambers — double bass
- Jimmy Cobb — drums
