= Miles & Monk at Newport =

Live album by Miles Davis and Thelonious Monk
- Released: June 1964
- Recorded: July 3, 1958; July 4, 1963
- Venue: Newport Jazz Festival
- Genre: Jazz
- Length: 51:00 (LP); 1:31:39 (CD)
- Label: Columbia
- Producer: Teo Macero

Thelonious Monk chronology
Big Band and Quartet in Concert (1964)	Miles & Monk at Newport (1964)	It's Monk's Time (1964)

Miles Davis chronology
Quiet Nights (1963)	Miles & Monk at Newport (1964)	Miles Davis in Europe (1964)

Miles Davis live chronology
Miles Davis at Newport 1955–1975: The Bootleg Series Vol. 4 (1955)	Miles & Monk at Newport (1958)	Miles Davis at Newport 1958 (1958)

Professional ratings
Review scores
Source	Rating
The Penguin Guide to Jazz Recordings	(CD reissue)

Miles & Monk at Newport is a split album featuring separate performances by the Miles Davis sextet and the Thelonious Monk quartet at the Newport Jazz Festival. It was released in June 1964 by Columbia Records. Davis's set was recorded in 1958, and Monk's in 1963. Despite the album's title, the two artists do not perform together at either date.

On the first side of the LP was a series of high tempo performances of bebop tunes and other staples of the Davis live repertoire from 1958. The performance was contemporaneous with Davis' Milestones album. Aside from the 1973 release Jazz at the Plaza (also a 1958 concert) during the LP era, this was the only legitimate (non-bootleg) recording of a live Davis combo performance earlier than the 1960 Blackhawk recordings. As such, this performance and Jazz at the Plaza were the only legitimate live recordings representing the Kind of Blue sextet. On the second side were a few numbers by Thelonious Monk's combo, from a 1963 Newport appearance. It featured an idiosyncratic appearance by clarinetist Pee Wee Russell. The Miles set was recorded in mono and the Monk set was recorded in stereo, so the mono LP featured a fold-down of the Monk set and the stereo LP featured an electronically re-channeled for stereo remix of the Miles set.

In 1973, an expanded version of the Davis Newport performance was released as the LP Miles & Coltrane.

In 1994 the album was released with the Davis Newport performances expanded and the Monk portion released separately on the 2CD Monk compilation At Newport 1963 & 1965.

== Track listing ==
=== Original LP ===
Columbia – CS 8978

Side one: Davis in 1958
No.	Title	Writer(s)	Length
1.	"Ah-Leu-Cha"	Charlie Parker	5:47
2.	"Straight, No Chaser"	Thelonious Monk	8:46
3.	"Fran-Dance"	Miles Davis	7:04
4.	"Two Bass Hit"	Dizzy Gillespie, John Lewis	4:13
Total length:			25:50

Side two: Monk in 1963
No.	Title	Writer(s)	Length
1.	"Nutty"	Thelonious Monk	13:55
2.	"Blue Monk"	Thelonious Monk	11:15
Total length:			25:10

=== CD Reissue ===
SME Records – SRCS 9732-3

Disc one: Davis in 1958
No.	Title	Writer(s)	Length
1.	"Introduction"		2:11
2.	"Ah-Leu-Cha"	Charlie Parker	5:56
3.	"Straight, No Chaser"	Thelonious Monk	8:50
4.	"Fran-Dance"	Miles Davis	7:08
5.	"Two Bass Hit"	Dizzy Gillespie, John Lewis	4:14
6.	"Bye Bye Blackbird"	Mort Dixon, Ray Henderson	9:11
7.	"The Theme"	Isham Jones, Marty Symes	2:50
Total length:			40:20

Disc two: Monk in 1963
No.	Title	Writer(s)	Length
1.	"Introduction"		1:25
2.	"Criss-Cross"	Thelonious Monk	8:12
3.	"Light Blue"	Thelonious Monk	9:53
4.	"Nutty"	Thelonious Monk	13:51
5.	"Blue Monk"	Thelonious Monk	11:24
6.	"Epistrophy"	Thelonious Monk, Kenny Clarke	6:34
Total length:			51:19

== Personnel ==
Side one personnel

- Miles Davis – trumpet
- Cannonball Adderley – alto saxophone
- John Coltrane – tenor saxophone
- Bill Evans – piano
- Paul Chambers – bass
- Jimmy Cobb – drums

Side two personnel

- Pee Wee Russell – clarinet
- Charlie Rouse – tenor saxophone
- Thelonious Monk – piano
- Butch Warren – bass
- Frankie Dunlop – drums
