= Porgy and Bess (Miles Davis album) =

1959 studio album by Miles Davis

Studio album by Miles Davis
- Released: March 9, 1959
- Recorded: July 22 & 29 and August 4 & 18, 1958
- Studios: Columbia 30th Street, New York City
- Genres: Third stream; orchestral jazz; cool jazz
- Length: 50:53
- Labels: Columbia; CL 1274 (mono), CS 8085 (stereo)
- Producer: Cal Lampley

Miles Davis chronology
Milestones (1958)	Porgy and Bess (1959)	Miles Davis and the Modern Jazz Giants (1959)

Alternative cover
- UK 45 rpm release

Porgy and Bess (CL 1274) is a studio album by the jazz musician Miles Davis, released in March 1959 on Columbia Records. The album features arrangements by Davis and collaborator Gil Evans from George Gershwin's 1935 opera of the same name. The album was recorded in four sessions on July 22, July 29, August 4, and August 18, 1958, at Columbia's 30th Street Studio in New York City. It is the third collaboration between Davis and Evans and has garnered much critical acclaim since its release, being acknowledged by some music critics as the best of their collaborations. Jazz critics have regarded the album as historically important.

== Background ==
=== Conception ===
In 1958, Davis was one of many jazz musicians growing dissatisfied with bebop, seeing its increasingly complex chord changes as hindering creativity. Five years earlier, in 1953, pianist George Russell published his Lydian Chromatic Concept of Tonal Organization, which offered an alternative to the practice of improvisation based on chords. Abandoning the traditional major and minor key relationships of classical music, Russell developed a new formulation using scales or a series of scales for improvisations. His approach to improvisation came to be known as modal in jazz. Davis saw Russell's methods of composition as a means of getting away from the dense chord-laden compositions of his time, which Davis had labeled "thick". Modal composition, with its reliance on scales and modes, represented, as Davis put it, "a return to melody". In a 1958 interview with Nat Hentoff of The Jazz Review, Davis remarked on the modal approach:

When Gil wrote the arrangement of "I Loves You, Porgy", he only wrote a scale for me. No chords... gives you a lot more freedom and space to hear things... there will be fewer chords but infinite possibilities as to what to do with them. Classical composers have been writing this way for years, but jazz musicians seldom have.

— Miles Davis

In early 1958, Davis began using this approach with his sextet. Influenced by Russell's ideas, Davis implemented his first modal composition with the title track of his 1958 album Milestones, which was based on two modes, recorded in April of that year. Instead of soloing in the straight, conventional, melodic way, Davis's new style of improvisation featured rapid mode and scale changes played against sparse chord changes. Davis' second collaboration with Gil Evans on Porgy and Bess gave him more room for experimentation with Russell's concept and with third stream playing, as Evans' compositions for Davis featured this modal concept.

=== Adaptation ===
The musical, commercial and critical success of 1957's Miles Ahead helped make future Davis/Evans ventures possible, as it impressed Columbia Records enough for them to bestow further artistic control upon Davis and Evans. At that period, Davis' renewed partnership with Frances Taylor, who was dancing in the New York City Center's production of the George Gershwin/DuBose Heyward/Ira Gershwin opera Porgy and Bess, led Davis "to see that a lot and that's where I got the idea to do the music".

At the same time the Samuel Goldwyn film adaptation was in production, set for release in June 1959. The advance publicity for the film was considerable, and with the late-1950s vogue for recorded "jazz versions of...", a number of Porgy and Bess jazz interpretations were released. These ranged from an all-star big band version arranged and conducted by Bill Potts to one by Bob Crosby and the Bobcats. Following the first collaboration with Evans, Davis followed up on these efforts with much interest in symphonic readings, which, at the time, jazzmen were not known for, and neither were some classically trained musicians known for interpreting jazz scores. Nevertheless, Davis enlisted members of his sextet, including Cannonball Adderley and Paul Chambers. In his autobiography Davis recalls, that at the time "everyone got tired of Philly's junkie shit" and Davis replaced his dear drummer (since 1955) with Jimmy Cobb, who played once with Davis at the Café Bohemia (sitting in for Art Taylor), and was the drummer of the following Kind of Blue recorded in March and April the following year.

== Reception and influence ==
Professional ratings
Review scores
Source	Rating
AllMusic	5/5 stars
DownBeat	5/5 stars
The Encyclopedia of Popular Music	5/5 stars
Entertainment Weekly	A
The Penguin Guide to Jazz	4/4 stars
The Rolling Stone Album Guide	5/5 stars

The second in a series of Davis/Evans collaborations, Porgy and Bess was well received upon its release by music critics and publications, including The New York Times and Los Angeles Times. Music writer Bill Kirchner wrote "In this century's American music, three partnerships have been most influential: Duke Ellington/Billy Strayhorn, Frank Sinatra/Nelson Riddle, and Miles Davis/Gil Evans." As one of Davis' best-selling albums, Porgy and Bess has earned recognition as a landmark album in orchestral jazz. Davis biographer Jack Chambers described the album as "a new score, with its own integrity, order and action".

The album's appeal was more widespread among critics following its reissue in 1997. Robert Gilbert of All About Jazz praised Porgy and Bess, describing it as "one of many great albums that Miles Davis recorded over his lifetime. It reaches a higher plateau than most, though, in its way that it can reach the listener on both a musical and emotional level. That the album is still able to do this after almost forty-five years is a testament to the rare magic that occurred in a New York studio over four days in the summer of 1958."

In August 1997, JazzTimes magazine called Porgy and Bess "possibly the best of the collaborations between Miles and Gil Evans ... Evans is justly regarded as the master of modern orchestration and Porgy and Bess shows him at his best." The album was included in Elvis Costello's "500 Albums You Need" (Vanity Fair, Issue No. 483 11/00) and was ranked No. 785 on the Virgin "All-Time Top 1000 Album" list.

== Track listing ==
All compositions written by George Gershwin, except otherwise noted. (Although Ira Gershwin and DuBose Heyward wrote lyrics to the opera Porgy and Bess, these recordings are instrumental.)

=== Side one ===
Track	Recorded	Song	Writer	Time
1.	8/4/58	"Buzzard Song"	George Gershwin	4:07
2.	7/29/58	"Bess, You Is My Woman Now"	George Gershwin	5:10
3.	7/22/58	"Gone"	Gil Evans	3:37
4.	7/22/58	"Gone, Gone, Gone"	George Gershwin	2:03
5.	8/4/58	"Summertime"	George Gershwin	3:17
6.	8/4/58	"Oh Bess, Oh Where's My Bess"	George Gershwin	4:18

=== Side two ===
Track	Recorded	Song	Writer	Time
1.	8/4/58	"Prayer (Oh Doctor Jesus)"	George Gershwin	4:39
2.	7/29/58	"Fisherman, Strawberry and Devil Crab"	George Gershwin	4:06
3.	7/22/58	"My Man's Gone Now"	George Gershwin	6:14
4.	7/29/58	"It Ain't Necessarily So"	George Gershwin	4:23
5.	7/29/58	"Here Come de Honey Man"	George Gershwin	1:18
6.	8/18/58	"I Wants to Stay Here (a.k.a. I Loves You, Porgy)"	George Gershwin	3:39
7.	8/4/58	"There's a Boat That's Leaving Soon for New York"	George Gershwin	3:23

=== Bonus tracks ===
Bonus cuts featured on the 1997 compact disc reissue.

Track	Recorded	Song	Writer	Time
14.	8/18/58	"I Loves You, Porgy" (take 1, second version)	George Gershwin	4:14
15.	7/22/58	"Gone" (take 4)	Gil Evans	3:40

== Personnel ==
Musicians

- Miles Davis – trumpet, flugelhorn
- Ernie Royal, Bernie Glow, Johnny Coles and Louis Mucci – trumpet
- Dick Hixson, Frank Rehak, Jimmy Cleveland and Joe Bennett – trombone
- Willie Ruff, Julius Watkins and Gunther Schuller – horn
- Bill Barber – tuba
- Jerome Richardson (tracks 1.1, 2.1, 2.7) and Phil Bodner (tracks 1.2–5, 2.2–7), Romeo Penque – flute, alto flute, clarinet
- Danny Bank – alto flute, bass flute, bass clarinet
- Cannonball Adderley – alto saxophone
- Paul Chambers – bass
- Philly Joe Jones – drums (except tracks 1.2, 2.2, 2.10–11)
- Jimmy Cobb – drums (tracks 1.2, 2.2, 2.10–11)
- Gil Evans – arranger, conductor

Production

- Cal Lampley – production
- Frank Laico – recording engineering
- Teresa Alfieri – cover design
- Roy DeCarava – cover photography
- Don Hunstein – liner photographs of sessions (reissue)

== Certifications and sales ==
Region	Certification	Certified units/sales
United Kingdom (BPI) sales since 2007	Silver	60,000^{^}
United States	—	286,000
^{^} Shipments figures based on certification alone.
