= Milestones (instrumental composition) =

Composition by Miles Davis

from the album Milestones
- Released: September 2, 1958
- Recorded: February 4, 1958
- Genre: Modal jazz
- Length: 5:45
- Label: Columbia
- Composer: Miles Davis
- Producer: George Avakian

"Milestones" is a jazz composition written by Miles Davis. It appears on the album of the same name in 1958. It has since become a jazz standard. "Milestones" is the first example of Miles composing in a modal style and experimentation in this piece led to the writing of "So What" from the 1959 album Kind of Blue. The song's modes consist of G Dorian for 16 bars, A Aeolian for another 16 bars, and then back to G Dorian for the last eight bars, then the progression repeats.

Originally titled "Miles" on the initial album pressings, people soon began referring to the piece as "Milestones" rather than "Miles". On later editions of the album the title was changed.

The musicians who performed on "Milestones" are:

- Miles Davis – trumpet
- Cannonball Adderley – alto saxophone
- John Coltrane – tenor saxophone
- Red Garland – piano
- Paul Chambers – double bass
- Philly Joe Jones – drums

Only Adderley, Davis, and Coltrane solo.

== 1947 song ==
"Milestones" is also the title of another composition credited to Miles Davis that John Lewis had written for him while playing with Charlie Parker. It is not musically related to the more famous tune.
