= On Green Dolphin Street (song) =

1947 song by Bronisław Kaper

Song by Jimmy Dorsey
- Published: 1947
- Genre: Pop, jazz
- Composer: Bronisław Kaper
- Lyricist: Ned Washington

"On Green Dolphin Street" is a 1947 jazz standard composed by Bronisław Kaper with lyrics by Ned Washington. The song was written for the film Green Dolphin Street, starring Lana Turner and Van Heflin, which was based on a 1944 novel of the same name by Elizabeth Goudge.

Jazz critic Ted Gioia noted that the song appeals to jazz musicians "because of its engaging chord changes, which alternate between eight bars of floating pedal point and eight bars of rapid harmonic movement."

The song was revived in 1956 by jazz pianist Ahmad Jamal on his album Count 'Em 88. As Gioia notes, Jamal's "repertoire choices were often mimicked" at this time by Miles Davis, and "Jamal's performance, with its artful use of space and dynamics, anticipates Davis's later rendition, especially with its shifting rhythmic textures." Davis's sextet version from 1958, with John Coltrane, Cannonball Adderley, and Bill Evans, solidified the song's position as a jazz classic. It has gone on to become one of the most widely covered of all jazz standards, with more than 700 versions to date.

Gioia wrote: "Vocalists occasionally tackle this song, but the lyrics suffer from shallowness. If you fell in love, would you sing about your beloved or just her address?" Among vocal versions, he prefers the one by Mark Murphy from 1961.

== Renditions ==
| Date | Main recording artist | Vocalist | Album title, notes | Ref. |
|---|---|---|---|---|
| 1947 | Jimmy Dorsey Orchestra | Bill Lawrence | Soundtrack for Green Dolphin Street. The commercial recording charted briefly at No. 25 in January 1948. | |
| 1955 | Urbie Green | instrumental | Urbie (East Coast Jazz/6) | |
| 1956 | Ahmad Jamal Trio | instrumental | Count 'Em 88 | |
| 1957 | Barney Kessel and the Poll Winners | instrumental | The Poll Winners | |
| 1958 | Miles Davis Sextet | instrumental | Jazz Track (with soundtrack Ascenseur pour l'échafaud), reissued as Basic Miles (1973) and 1958 Miles in Japan (1974), (also '58 Miles Featuring Stella by Starlight) | |
| 1959 | Jack Sheldon All-Star Big Band | instrumental | Jack's Groove | |
| 1959 | Bill Evans | instrumental | On Green Dolphin Street | |
| 1959 | Wynton Kelly | instrumental | Kelly Blue | |
| 1960 | Eric Dolphy Quintet | instrumental | Outward Bound | |
| 1960 | Duke Pearson | instrumental | Tender Feelin's | |
| 1960 | Dakota Staton | Dakota Staton | Dakota (1960) | |
| 1961 | Mark Murphy | Mark Murphy | Rah | |
| 1961 | Dinah Washington | Dinah Washington | The Complete Dinah Washington on Mercury, Vol. 7 (1961) | |
| 1961 | Nancy Wilson | Nancy Wilson | The Swingin's Mutual! | |
| 1962 | Oscar Peterson and Milt Jackson | instrumental | Very Tall | |
| 1962 | Mel Tormé | Mel Tormé | Comin' Home Baby! | |
| 1963 | Vince Guaraldi Quintet | instrumental | In Person | |
| 1964 | Tony Bennett | Tony Bennett | When Lights Are Low | |
| 1964 | Erroll Garner | instrumental | Nightconcert (2018) - Recording from the Concertgebouw on November 7, 1964 | |
| 1965 | Sonny Rollins | instrumental | Sonny Rollins on Impulse! | |
| 1965 | Bunky Green | instrumental | Testifyin' Time | |
| 1977 | Sadao Watanabe | instrumental | Live in Nemuro 1977 | |
| 1978 | Herbie Hancock | instrumental | The Piano | |
| 1982 | Tony Rice Unit | instrumental | Backwaters | |
| 1986 | Joe Pass and Ella Fitzgerald | Ella Fitzgerald | Easy Living | |
| 1987 | Stan Getz and Kenny Barron | instrumental | Serenity | |
| 2013 | Beegie Adair | instrumental | As Time Goes By | |
| 2021 | Alan Stassforth and Michael Lindner | instrumental | The Pandemic Sessions | |

== In popular culture ==
"On Green Dolphin Street" is referenced in the sixth part of JoJo's Bizarre Adventure, Stone Ocean in the name of Green Dolphin Street Prison, the primary setting of the story.
