= Oleo (composition) =

1954 composition by Sonny Rollins

Composition by Sonny Rollins
- Written: 1954
- Genre: Bebop; hard bop
- Composers: George Gershwin; Sonny Rollins

"Oleo" is a hard bop composition by Sonny Rollins, written in 1954. It has become a jazz standard, and has been performed by numerous jazz artists such as Miles Davis, John Coltrane, and Bill Evans.

== Form ==
"Oleo" is one of a number of jazz standards to be based on the same chord progression as that employed by George Gershwin's "I Got Rhythm", also known as a contrafact. Its melody has "become one of the standard rhythm changes melodies used by jazz musicians".

== Recordings ==
The first version of the song, featuring Rollins, was recorded by Miles Davis and Sonny Rollins in 1954 for the record Miles Davis with Sonny Rollins. With John Coltrane instead of Rollins on saxophone, it was recorded again in 1956 and released on Relaxin'. A live version from 1958, also with Coltrane, appears on two separate Davis albums: 1958 Miles, which was released in late 1958, and Jazz at the Plaza (1973). Another Davis live version from 1961 appears on In Person Friday and Saturday Nights at the Blackhawk, Complete.

Other artists who have made recordings of the piece include Miles Davis, John Coltrane, Bill Evans, Michael Brecker, Eric Dolphy, Lee Konitz, Jeff Sipe, Pat Martino, Patrice Rushen, and Larry Coryell.

== See also ==
- List of jazz contrafacts
