= Jazz at the Plaza Vol. I =

Live album by the Miles Davis Sextet
- Released: September 28, 1973
- Recorded: September 9, 1958
- Venues: Plaza Hotel; New York City
- Genres: Jazz; hard bop
- Length: 41:02
- Label: Columbia
- Producer: Teo Macero

The Miles Davis Sextet chronology
In Concert (1973)	Jazz at the Plaza Vol. I (1973)	1958 Miles (1974)

Miles Davis live chronology
Miles & Monk at Newport (1958)	Jazz at the Plaza Vol. I (1958)	In Person Friday and Saturday Nights at the Blackhawk, Complete (1958)

Jazz at the Plaza Vol. I is a live album by the Miles Davis Sextet. It was recorded in 1958 and released in 1973 by Columbia Records. Duke Ellington was recorded at the same event and released as the second volume (Jazz at the Plaza Vol. II).

== Background ==
The album features the famed sextet that recorded Kind of Blue six months later. The concert was recorded in 1958 but not released in full until 1973. The last three songs would reappear (in reverse order) in 1974, on 1958 Miles, but on Jazz at the Plaza, all the tracks are of much better sound quality. The musicians did not know they were being recorded at the time. The event was a party thrown by Columbia to celebrate the healthy state of their jazz division. Indeed, it was not meant to be a record session: "it was a party. We taped it because we wanted to remember it, in case it never happened again." Pianist Bill Evans later stated the musicians who were still alive at the time of release were offered payment at the 1958 scale.

"My Funny Valentine," which had become a staple of the band's playbook, is played in the group's new modal style. Coltrane and Adderley sit out for this track, and Evans, "ruminating moodily," takes an extended solo, "conjuring magical colors out of the resident 'honky-tonk'" piano. (This track is also available on the Evans compilation Piano Player.) On "Straight, No Chaser," Davis plays the theme faster than usual and alternates the groove between full and cut time, while Evans quotes "Blue Monk" in his own solo.

The original LP misidentified the tune "Straight, No Chaser" as "Jazz at the Plaza," the drummer as Philly Joe Jones, and the location as the Edwardian Room.

== Critical reception ==
Professional ratings
Review scores
Source	Rating
The Penguin Guide to Jazz Recordings	3/4 stars
DownBeat	4.5/5 stars
Allmusic	4/5 stars

AllMusic's Thom Jurek felt that it "succeeds mightily on the level" of a "remarkable band's (...) fine performance." He recommended it strictly to jazz listeners as a "curiosity piece" because of its "dodgy" and "dubious sound quality." In its four-star review of the album, DownBeat found the music "engaging" and stated, "The intrigue from the redefined hard-bop here has everything to do with Davis' elliptical phrasings and seeming impatience with the latter-day offspring of bebop."

DownBeat's Alan Heineman writes, "This is the sextet at very nearly peak form; why this session went unreleased for 15 years is therefore a mystery". Heineman says of "My Funny Valentine", "I can think off-hand of at least four other versions by Miles of this tune, and this may well be the best he ever did with it. Gorgeous"! And Heineman goes on to conclude, "When the music is good here—as it is more often than not—the solar system is too low a rating".

== Track listing ==
Side one
No.	Title	Writer(s)	Length
1.	"If I Were a Bell"	Frank Loesser	8:31
2.	"Oleo"	Sonny Rollins	10:39

Side two
No.	Title	Writer(s)	Length
1.	"My Funny Valentine"	Richard Rodgers, Lorenz Hart	10:19
2.	"Straight, No Chaser"	Thelonious Monk	10:56

== Personnel ==
- Miles Davis – trumpet
- John Coltrane – tenor saxophone
- Julian "Cannonball" Adderley – alto saxophone
- Bill Evans – piano
- Paul Chambers – bass
- Jimmy Cobb – drums
