= Jazz Track =

Studio album by Miles Davis
- Released: November 1959
- Recorded: December 4, 1957, Paris, May 26, 1958
- Studio: Columbia 30th Street (New York City)
- Genres: Jazz, hard bop, modal jazz
- Length: 45:55
- Label: Columbia
- Producer: Teo Macero

Miles Davis chronology
Kind of Blue (1959)	Jazz Track (1959)	Workin' with the Miles Davis Quintet (1960)

Alternate cover

Professional ratings
Review scores
Source	Rating
The Encyclopedia of Popular Music	3/5 stars

Jazz Track is an album by Miles Davis, released in November 1959 by Columbia Records, catalogue CL 1268. It compiles sessions by the most recent edition of the Davis Sextet which were insufficient to compose an entire LP, with music previously released in France as a soundtrack. It was nominated for the Grammy Award for Best Jazz Performance Solo or Small Group.

== Content ==
Side one is the American issue of material recorded on December 4, 1957, for the soundtrack of the 1958 Louis Malle film Ascenseur pour l'échafaud, and previously released in Europe as a 10 inch LP on the Fontana label. The soundtrack was recorded in Paris, December 4, 1957, using local musicians, including American expatriate drummer Kenny Clarke.

Side two consists of newly released material recorded by his sextet on May 26, 1958. These were the same musicians who would soon record Kind of Blue, excluding pianist Wynton Kelly. The composition "Fran Dance" is named for Davis' wife, Frances Taylor.

The complete Fontana soundtrack was issued on compact disc in the 1980s, using the original title and Fontana artwork, expanded with all studio takes from the session. The sextet material was rereleased in 1974 under the title 1958 Miles, with live recordings from the same year replacing the soundtrack material. This album, and not Jazz Track, survived into the compact disc era. The sextet material, with additional tracks, appeared again in 2008 as part of the Kind of Blue 50th Anniversary Edition on Legacy Records.

== Track listing ==
All tracks written by Miles Davis except as indicated.

=== Side one ===
No.	Title	Length
1.	"Générique" (Nuit sur les Champs-Élysées, take 3)	2:46
2.	"L'Assassinat de Carala" (Assassinat, take 3)	2:08
3.	"Sur l'Autoroute" (Séquence Voiture, take 2)	2:16
4.	"Julien dans l'Ascenseur" (Assassinat, take 2)	2:07
5.	"Florence sur les Champs-Élysées" (Nuit sur les Champs-Élysées, take 4)	2:49
6.	"Dîner au Motel" (Motel)	3:55
7.	"Évasion de Julien" (Ascenseur)	0:50
8.	"Visite du Vigile" (Assassinat, take 1)	2:02
9.	"Au bar du Petit Bac" (Le Petit Bal, take 2)	2:51
10.	"Chez le Photographe du Motel" (Final, take 3)	3:52

=== Side two ===
No.	Title	Writer(s)	Length
1.	"On Green Dolphin Street" (take 3)	Bronisław Kaper, Ned Washington	9:55
2.	"Fran Dance" (incorrectly listed as "Put Your Little Foot Right Out")		5:52
3.	"Stella by Starlight" (take 3/7)	Victor Young, Ned Washington	4:48

== Personnel ==
Side one

- Miles Davis – trumpet
- Barney Wilen – tenor saxophone
- René Urtreger – piano
- Pierre Michelot – double bass
- Kenny Clarke – drums

Side two

- Miles Davis – trumpet
- Julian "Cannonball" Adderley – alto saxophone
- John Coltrane – tenor saxophone
- Bill Evans – piano
- Paul Chambers – bass
- Jimmy Cobb – drums
