= Frances Taylor Davis =

American dancer, ballerina, and actress (1929–2018)

- Taylor Davis in 1964
- Born: Frances Elizabeth Taylor; September 28, 1929; Chicago, Illinois, U.S.
- Died: November 17, 2018 (aged 89)
- Other names: Elizabeth Taylor (on Broadway), Frances Davis
- Occupations: Dancer, choreographer, actress
- Known for: First black ballerina in the Paris Opera Ballet
- Spouses: Jean-Marie Durand (m. 1955, divorced); Miles Davis (m. 1959–1968)

Frances Elizabeth Taylor Davis (September 28, 1929 – November 17, 2018) was an American dancer and actress who was a member of the Katherine Dunham Company, and the first African American ballerina to perform with the Paris Opera Ballet.

Credited as Elizabeth Taylor, she had roles in the Broadway musicals Mr. Wonderful, Shinbone Alley, and was an original cast member of West Side Story. Taylor also appeared in the Off-Broadway productions of Carmen Jones and Porgy and Bess. At the peak of her career, she left Broadway to marry jazz musician Miles Davis.

== Life and career ==
=== Early life ===
Francis Elizabeth Taylor was born on September 28, 1929, in Chicago, Illinois and grew up in the Rosenwald Courts Apartments. Her father worked at the post office. She began dancing classical ballet at age 8, and by age 16 was performing Swan Lake. Her instructor encouraged her to audition for the Edna McRae School of the Dance, where she became the only African American student. While attending the school, Taylor met dancer and choreographer Katherine Dunham who offered her a scholarship to study dance at the Dunham School of Dance and Theatre. Taylor finished high school, then briefly attended college but decided to pursue a dancing career instead.

=== Career ===
Taylor joined the Katherine Dunham Company, where she was taught by Walter Nicks. She trained and toured extensively with the dance company in Europe and South America.

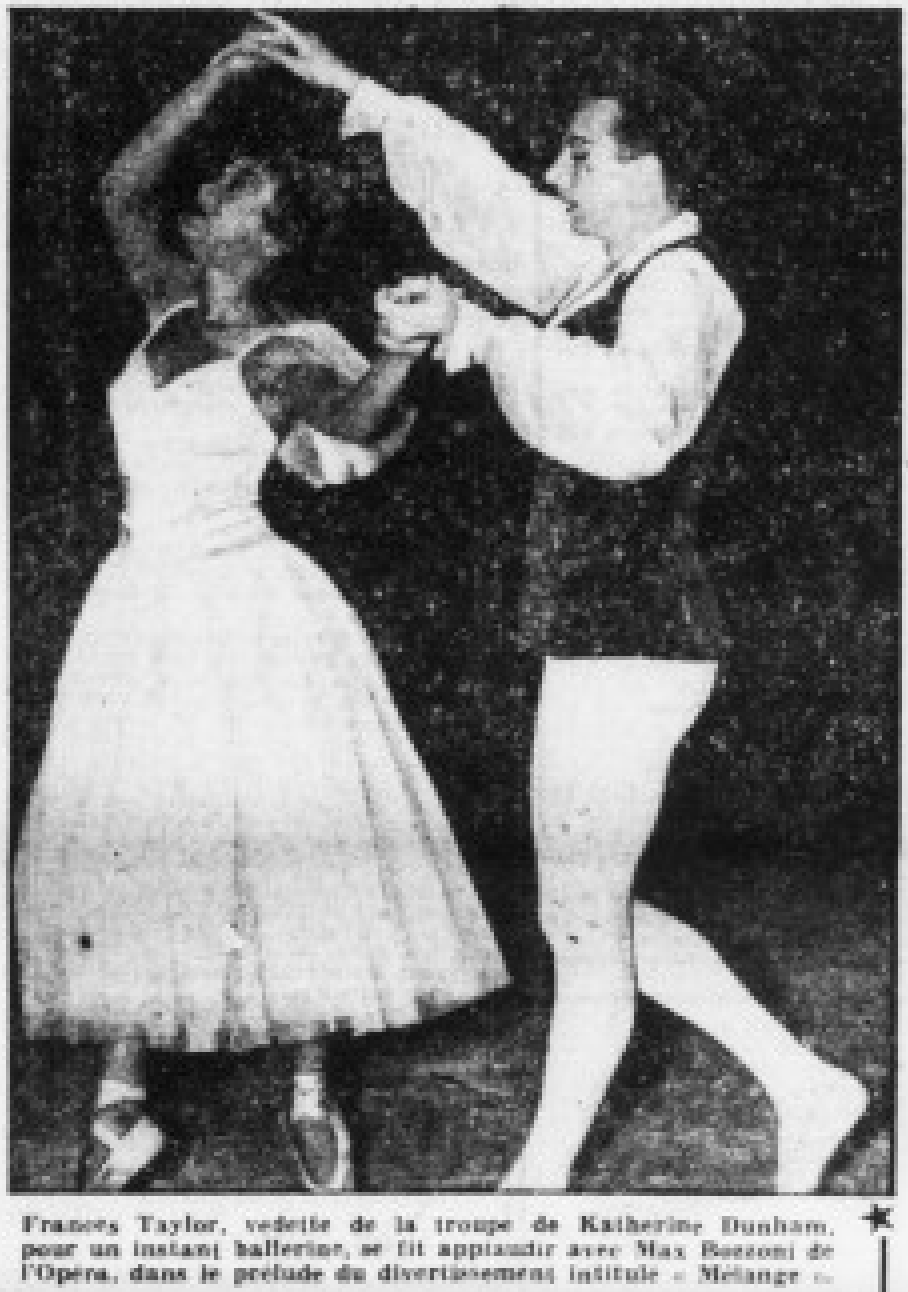
Frances Taylor is wearing a tutu dress and dancing en pointe with Max Bozzoni, star of the Paris Opera Ballet, on 4 December 1951 at the Théâtre des Champs-Élysées

In December 1951, Taylor was recruited for a special presentation with the Paris Opera Ballet, becoming the first African-American to perform with the ballet company. She received rave reviews from the press for her performances in Paris and was compared to French ballet dancer Leslie Caron. She performed with Benny Goodman at the London Palladium. While in London, Taylor rehearsed with Sadler's Wells Ballet.

In 1953, Taylor was asked by Sammy Davis Jr. to appear as his girlfriend in the ill-fated ABC TV show Three for the Road – with the Will Mastin Trio. She and Davis had met at Ciro's nightclub where she was performing with the Dunham troupe. Three for the Road was about struggling musicians, and avoided the stereotypical portrayals of African-Americans common during that era. The cast included actresses Ruth Attaway and Jane White, as well as Frederick O'Neal who founded the American Negro Theater. A pilot was filmed in the fall of 1953, but the show was postponed and eventually dropped when ABC was unable to get a sponsor.

In 1954, Taylor rejoined the Dunham troupe as a lead dancer for engagements in Rome but later relocated to New York City so she could act on Broadway. She was credited as Elizabeth Taylor (using her middle name) because there was already an actress named Frances Taylor.

Taylor appeared in Off-Broadway productions of Porgy and Bess and Carmen Jones at New York City Center. She also appeared in three Broadway musicals: Mr. Wonderful, Shinbone Alley, and, notably, West Side Story. On West Side Story's opening night in September 1957, Taylor received the company's "gypsy robe" for being the outstanding dancer in the cast.

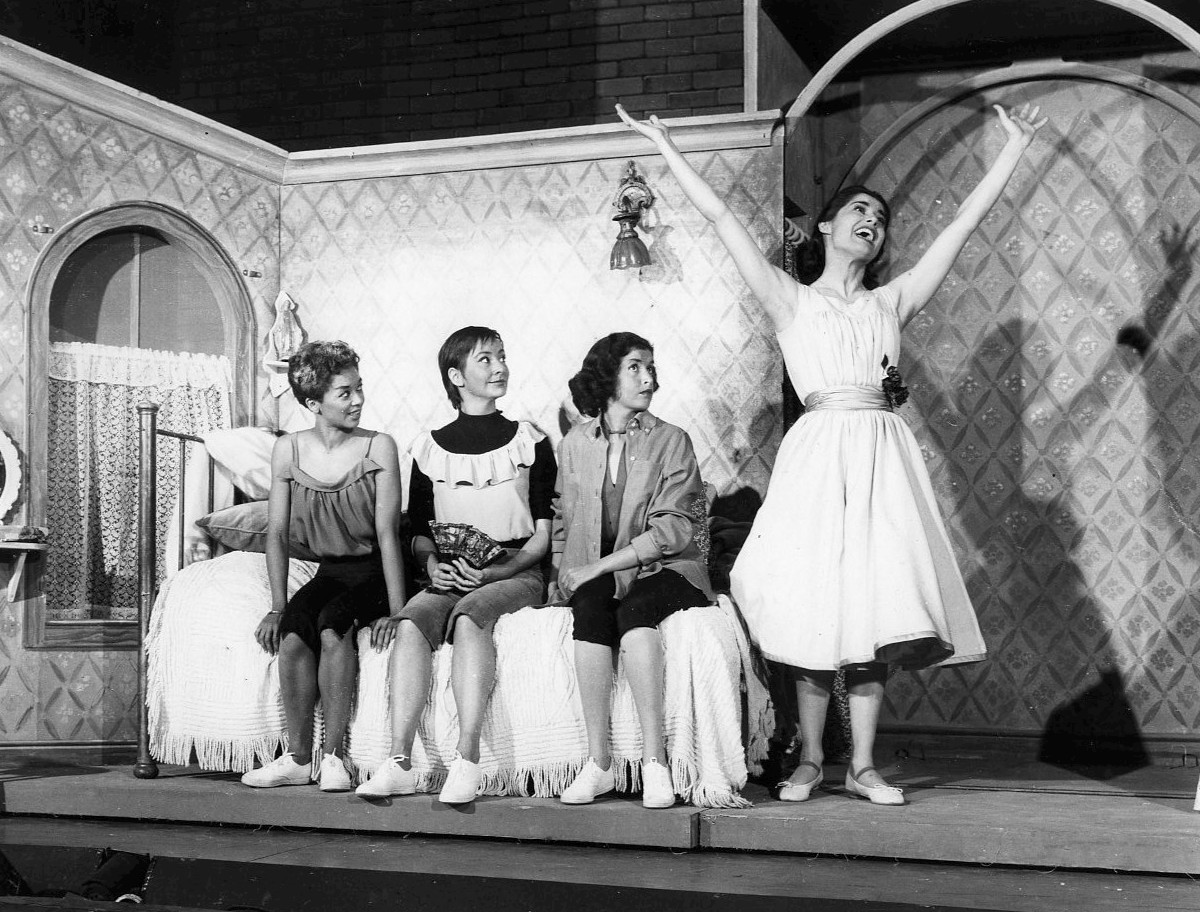
Performing as Francisca (left) in the song "I Feel Pretty" for the original 1957 Broadway production of West Side Story

Jet magazine reported in April 1958 that Taylor quit the production to pursue a singing-dancing career, but she later revealed that she was dating jazz musician Miles Davis who forced her to quit in March 1958. According to Taylor, Davis said "A woman should be with her man. I want you out of West Side Story."

Davis allowed Taylor to conduct dancing classes for a while in 1959. Her students included Julie Robinson, a Dunham trouper and wife of actor Harry Belafonte, and Edna Mae Robinson, a chorus line dancer and wife of boxer Sugar Ray Robinson.

When Davis married Taylor in December 1959, he not only insisted that she quit West Side Story, but hampered her career in other ways. Choreographer Jerome Robbins, whom Taylor had worked with in West Side Story on Broadway, asked Davis if she could appear in the film West Side Story (1961); Davis refused. Sammy Davis Jr. approached Davis about Taylor appearing in the musical Golden Boy (1964); Davis refused again.

Following her split from Davis in 1965, Taylor taught private dance classes, appeared in television specials with performers such as Elvis Presley, and had a role as the maid in the film The Party (1968).

After Taylor retired, she became a restaurant hostess in Los Angeles. She worked at Hamburger Hamlet, Roy's Restaurant, Le Dome, and Chasen's.

== Personal life ==
Taylor first met Davis when she was dancing at Ciro's nightclub in Los Angeles in 1953. When she traveled back to Chicago, Davis was also in town for gigs. Taylor introduced Davis to her family; Miles asked Frances' father for her hand in marriage, to which her father said, "No." Taylor also rejected Miles' proposal.

Taylor married Jean-Marie Durand in Mexico City in 1955 where they were both performing. Durand was of Haitian descent and also a member of the Katherine Dunham troupe; he and Frances met in Argentina in 1954. Taylor left the troupe following the marriage and gave birth to a son, Jean-Pierre Durand (who reportedly inspired Miles' tune "Jean-Pierre").

After Taylor separated from Durand, she ran into Davis in New York City in 1957. Davis told her, "Now that I've found you, I'll never let you go." Taylor and Davis were married in Toledo, Ohio on December 21, 1959.

Taylor became Davis' muse, influencing his change in musical direction. Davis wrote "Fran Dance" for Taylor; it appears on his album Jazz Track (1959). Her role in the musical Porgy and Bess inspired his album Porgy and Bess (1959). His album Sketches of Spain (1960) was inspired by a flamenco performance Taylor insisted they attend.

Davis featured Taylor on the cover of multiple albums, including Someday My Prince Will Come (1961). However, the marriage was marred by domestic violence. Davis became increasingly violent towards Taylor as his cocaine addiction and alcohol abuse worsened. Wrote Davis in his 1990 memoir Miles: The Autobiography: "Every time I hit her, I felt bad because a lot of it really wasn't her fault but had to do with me being temperamental and jealous."

Shortly after Taylor and Davis were photographed together for the cover of E.S.P. (1965), Taylor fled and went to stay with her friend, singer Nancy Wilson in California. Taylor filed for divorce in 1966 and it was finalized in 1968. She was interviewed for the documentary Miles Davis: Birth of the Cool; it was released posthumously in 2019.

Taylor had a relationship with George Barrie, CEO of Fabergé.

In 1990, Taylor filed a lawsuit charging her long-time friend Eartha Kitt with assault and battery. Taylor alleged that Kitt attacked her after they had drinks at the Hollywood Roosevelt Hotel.

== Death ==
Taylor died at the age of 89 on November 17, 2018. She was survived by her son Jean-Pierre Durand, stepdaughter Cheryl Davis, grandchildren, and great-grandchildren.

== Filmography ==
Year	Film	Role
1968	The Party	Maid
2001	The Miles Davis Story	Herself

== Stage ==
Year	Production	Role	Notes
1956/1957	Porgy and Bess		City Center Revival
1956	Carmen Jones	Dancer	City Center Revival
1957	Mr. Wonderful	Soprano, Dancer [Replacement]	Original Broadway Production
1957	Shinbone Alley	Jail Crony, Dancer	Original Broadway Production
1957/1958	West Side Story	Francisca	Original Broadway Production
