= Milestones (Miles Davis album) =

Studio album by Miles Davis
- Released: September 2, 1958
- Recorded: February 4 and March 4, 1958
- Studio: Columbia 30th Street (New York City)
- Genre: Jazz, modal jazz, bebop
- Length: 47:36
- Label: Columbia
- Producer: George Avakian

Miles Davis chronology
Ascenseur pour l'échafaud (1958)	Milestones (1958)	Porgy and Bess (1959)

Professional ratings
Review scores
Source	Rating
AllMusic	5/5 stars
DownBeat	4/5 stars
The Encyclopedia of Popular Music	4/5 stars
The Penguin Guide to Jazz Recordings	4/4 stars

Milestones is a studio album by Miles Davis. It was recorded with his "first great quintet" (augmented to a sextet with the addition of alto saxophonist Cannonball Adderley) and released in September 1958 by Columbia Records.

== Composition ==
At this point, Davis was experimenting with modal composition and improvisation, in which a key center is abandoned, and players use scale patterns beyond major and minor. Tenor saxophonist John Coltrane's return to Davis' group in 1958 coincided with the "modal phase" albums: Milestones and Kind of Blue (1959).

Davis plays both trumpet and piano on "Sid's Ahead", a blues which is reminiscent of "Walkin'" that Davis had recorded under the title "Weirdo" for Blue Note in 1954. He plays trumpet in the ensemble passages and solos on trumpet but moves to the piano to accompany the saxophonists and Paul Chambers' bass solo in the absence of pianist Red Garland. "Billy Boy" is a rhythm section feature that showcases Garland's signature block chord playing.

Davis himself said about the album in his 1989 autobiography, Miles: The Autobiography, "...I loved the way the band sounded on this record and I knew that we had something special. Trane and Cannon were really playing their asses off and by then were really used to each other."

== Critical reception ==
In a five-star review, AllMusic's Thom Jurek called Milestones a classic album with blues material in both bebop and post-bop veins, as well as the "memorable" title track, which introduced modalism in jazz and defined Davis' subsequent music in the years to follow. Andy Hermann of PopMatters felt that the album offers more aggressive swinging than Kind of Blue and showcases the first session between saxophonists Coltrane and Cannonball Adderley, whose different styles "feed off each other and push each musician to greater heights." Jim Santella of All About Jazz said that the quality of the personnel Davis enlisted was "the very best", even though the sextet was short-lived, and that Milestones is "a seminal album that helped shape jazz history."

The Penguin Guide to Jazz selected the album as part of its suggested "Core Collection", calling it "one of the very great modern-jazz albums."

== Stereo remix and remaster ==
Milestones was originally released in mono, as well as in electronically re-channeled stereo (also called pseudo-stereo). The album was remixed and remastered in stereo for The Complete Columbia Recordings of Miles Davis with John Coltrane and, in 2001, reissued in stereo on the Columbia/Legacy label.

== Track listing ==
Side one

1. "Dr. Jekyll" (titled "Dr. Jackle" on later LP and CD releases) – 5:55 (Jackie McLean)
2. "Sid's Ahead" – 13:13 (Miles Davis)
3. "Two Bass Hit" – 5:19 (John Lewis, Dizzy Gillespie)

Side two

1. "Miles" (titled "Milestones" on later LP and CD releases) – 5:49 (Davis)
2. "Billy Boy" – 7:19 (Traditional; arranged by Ahmad Jamal)
3. "Straight, No Chaser" – 10:41 (Thelonious Monk)
- Sides one and two were combined as tracks 1–6 on CD reissues.

CD reissue bonus tracks

7. "Two Bass Hit" (alternate take) – 4:29
8. "Milestones" (alternate take) – 5:58
9. "Straight, No Chaser" (alternate take) – 10:28

Tracks 3–9 recorded on February 4, 1958; tracks 1–2 recorded on March 4, 1958.

== Personnel ==
- Miles Davis – trumpet, piano (on "Sid's Ahead"), flugelhorn (on "Milestones")
- Julian "Cannonball" Adderley – alto saxophone
- John Coltrane – tenor saxophone
- Red Garland – piano (except on "Sid's Ahead")
- Paul Chambers – double bass
- Philly Joe Jones – drums
