= Someday My Prince Will Come (Miles Davis album) =

1961 studio album by Miles Davis

- Album cover featuring Davis's wife, Frances.

Studio album by Miles Davis
- Released: December 11, 1961
- Recorded: March 7, 20, 21, 1961
- Studio: Columbia 30th Street Studio, New York City
- Genre: Jazz
- Length: 41:45
- Label: Columbia
- Producer: Teo Macero

Miles Davis chronology
Steamin' with the Miles Davis Quintet (1961)	Someday My Prince Will Come (1961)	Seven Steps to Heaven (1963)

Someday My Prince Will Come is a studio album by American jazz musician Miles Davis, released on December 11, 1961, by Columbia Records. Recorded at Columbia's 30th Street Studio in Manhattan, New York City, it marked the only Miles Davis Quintet studio recording session to feature saxophonist Hank Mobley.

== Background ==
In 1959, Cannonball Adderley left to form his own group with his brother, reducing the sextet to a quintet. Drummer Jimmy Cobb and pianist Wynton Kelly had been hired in 1958. John Coltrane stayed in the group for a spring tour of Europe, but left to form his own quartet in the summer of 1960. In 1960, Davis went through saxophonists Jimmy Heath and Sonny Stitt before settling on Hank Mobley in December, the band re-stabilizing for the next two years.

== Composition ==
Unlike 1959's Kind of Blue, which featured nothing but group originals, this album paired equal numbers of Miles Davis tunes and pop standards, including the title song, originally from the 1937 Disney film Snow White and the Seven Dwarfs. The titles of all three Davis originals refer to specific individuals: "Pfrancing" to his wife Frances, featured on the album cover; "Teo" to his producer Teo Macero; and "Drad Dog" (Goddard reversed) to Columbia Records president Goddard Lieberson. While the cover credits the Miles Davis Sextet, only the title track featured six players, Coltrane making two cameo appearances on the album, taking solos on the title track and "Teo", playing instead of Mobley on the latter. On March 21, ex-Davis drummer Philly Joe Jones made his final contribution to a Davis session, replacing Cobb for the original "Blues No. 2" (which was not used on the album).

== Re-issue ==
On June 8, 1999, Legacy Recordings reissued the album on compact disc with two bonus tracks: the unused "Blues No. 2" and an alternative take of "Someday My Prince Will Come".

== Critical reception ==
Professional ratings
Review scores
Source	Rating
AllMusic	4/5 stars
DownBeat (1962)	4.5/5 stars
DownBeat (1990)	4/5 stars
The Encyclopedia of Popular Music	4/5 stars
MusicHound Jazz	4/5 stars
The Penguin Guide to Jazz	3/4 stars
The Rolling Stone Album Guide	4/5 stars

In a contemporary review for DownBeat magazine, Ira Gitler praised Coltrane's solo on the title track while finding Kelly equally exceptional as both a soloist and comping musician. "His single-lines are simultaneously hard and soft. Cobb and Chambers groove perfectly together and with Kelly", Gitler wrote. "The rhythm section, individually and as a whole, is very well-recorded." The magazine's Howard Mandel later viewed Someday My Prince Will Come as "a commercial realization rather than an artistic exploration" but nonetheless "lovely", highlighted by each musician's careful attention to notes and dynamics, and among Davis's most "romantic, bluesy and intentionally seductive programs".

The album is ranked number 994 in All-Time Top 1000 Albums (3rd edition, 2000).

== Track listing ==
Side one
No.	Title	Writer(s)	Length
1.	"Someday My Prince Will Come"	Frank Churchill, Larry Morey	9:02
2.	"Old Folks"	Willard Robison, Dedette Lee Hill	5:14
3.	"Pfrancing" (also known as "No Blues")	Miles Davis	8:30

Side two
No.	Title	Writer(s)	Length
1.	"Drad-Dog"	Miles Davis	4:49
2.	"Teo"	Miles Davis	9:33
3.	"I Thought About You"	Jimmy Van Heusen, Johnny Mercer	4:52

- Sides one and two were combined as tracks 1–6 on CD reissues.

1999 reissue bonus tracks
No.	Title	Writer(s)	Length
7.	"Blues No. 2"	Miles Davis	7:05
8.	"Someday My Prince Will Come" (alternate take)	Frank Churchill, Larry Morey	5:34

== Personnel ==
Musicians

- Miles Davis – trumpet
- Hank Mobley – tenor saxophone on all tracks except "Teo"
- John Coltrane – tenor saxophone on "Someday My Prince Will Come" (master) and "Teo"
- Wynton Kelly – piano
- Paul Chambers – bass
- Jimmy Cobb – drums all tracks except "Blues No. 2"
- Philly Joe Jones – drums on "Blues No. 2"

Production

- Teo Macero – producer
- Fred Plaut, Frank Laico – engineers
- Bob Cato – album cover design
- Frances Davis – cover model
- Michael Cuscuna, Bob Belden – reissue producers
- Mark Wilder – digital remastering engineer
- Seth Rothstein – reissue project coordinator
- Howard Fritzson – reissue art direction
- Eddie Henderson – reissue liner notes

== See also ==
- Love Songs (Miles Davis album)
- Dave Digs Disney-Dave Brubeck's 1957 album consisting of Disney songs
