= Lydian Chromatic Concept of Tonal Organization =

1953 jazz music theory book by George Russell

- First edition cover
- Author: George Russell
- Language: English
- Subject: Music theory
- Genre: Non-fiction
- Published: 1953
- Publisher: Concept Publishing Co.
- Publication place: United States
- Media type: Print
- Pages: 252 pp.
- ISBN: 0970373902
- OCLC: 18406156
- Website: lydianchromaticconcept.com

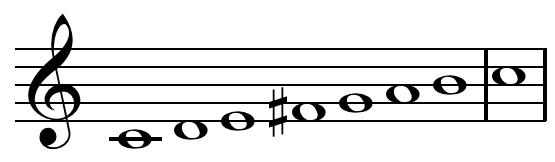
Lydian mode on C.

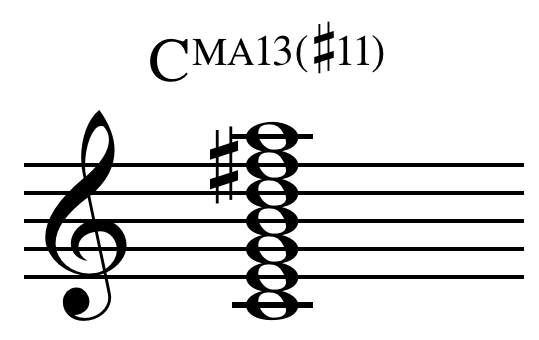
Thirteenth chord constructed from notes of the Lydian mode.

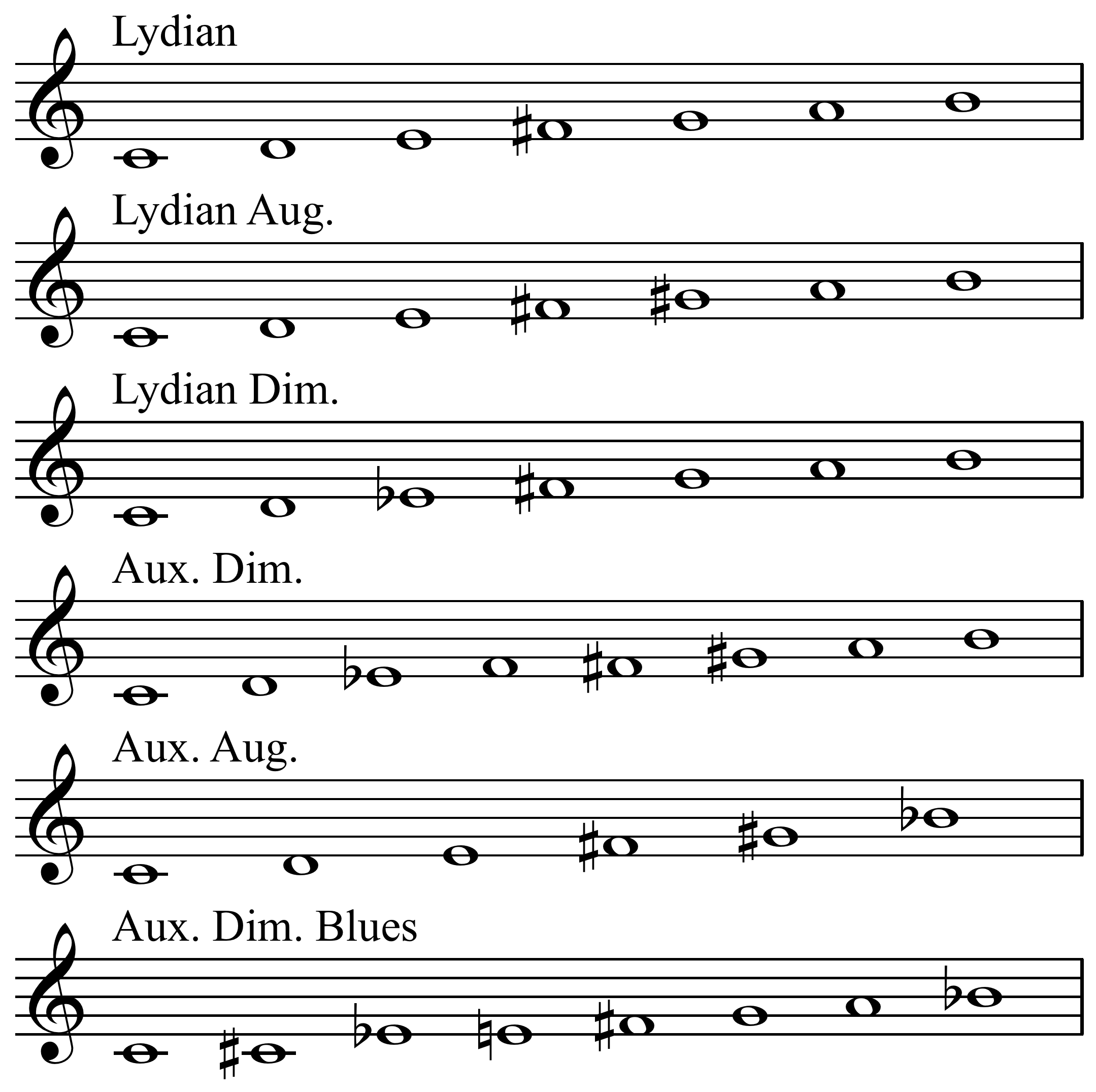
Russell's original six Lydian scales

The Lydian Chromatic Concept of Tonal Organization is a 1953 jazz music theory book written by George Russell. The book is the founding text of the Lydian Chromatic Concept (LCC), or Lydian Chromatic Theory (LCT). Russell's work postulates that all music is based on the tonal gravity of the Lydian mode.

== Deriving Lydian ==
Russell believed that dominant function is the driving force behind all harmonic motion. Russell focuses on the Lydian mode because it can be built with fifths. For instance, to construct a C Lydian scale one could list the first seven tones on the circle of fifths starting with C, the desired Lydian Tonic. This process would yield C, G, D, A, E, B, F♯. If these tones are voiced in the space of an octave, they form the Lydian mode; specifically, C Lydian (C, D, E, F♯, G, A, B). Additionally, Russell observed, when these tones are voiced in thirds they form the preferred form of a major 13 (#11) chord.

== The Lydian Chromatic Scale ==
Russell builds a prototype chromatic scale starting on the Lydian Tonic by stacking fifths, skipping the interval between the seventh and eighth tones, and placing the skipped tone at the end for having the lowest level of tonal gravity. Using C as the Lydian Tonic yields the following 12-note scale with enharmonic respellings: C, G, D, A, E, B, F♯, G♯, E♭ (D♯), B♭ (A♯), F (E♯), D♭ (C♯). Thus the Lydian Chromatic Scale and all its derivatives contain only Pythagorean intervals.

== Tonal gravity ==
Russell posited that tonal gravity emanates from the first seven tones of the Lydian mode. As the player ventures further from the Lydian tonic however (and further up the circle of fifths), the tonal gravity shifts. For example, if notes further up the circle of fifths (e.g. ♯2/♭3) are used, the tonal gravity is probably shifting.

== Influence ==
Russell's theory has had far-reaching effect especially in the realm of modal jazz. Art Farmer said that it "opens the door to countless means of melodic expression" and critic Joachim-Ernst Berendt described it as "the first work deriving a theory of jazz harmony from the immanent laws of jazz" and as "the pathbreaker for Miles Davis's and John Coltrane's 'modality'". Bill Evans and Miles Davis used the theory to record modal jazz such as the album Kind of Blue. John Coltrane's modal jazz is usually analyzed using Russell's method. In arguably his most famous piece, "Giant Steps," Coltrane can be heard traveling through a succession of three parent Lydian Chromatic scales: C Lydian, A♭ Lydian, and E Lydian. Additionally, many conservatories teach Russell's theory to varying degrees.

== See also ==
- Chord-scale system
