= Kind of Blue =

1959 studio album by Miles Davis

Studio album by Miles Davis
- Released: August 17, 1959
- Recorded: March 2 and April 22, 1959
- Studios: Columbia 30th Street Studio, New York City
- Genre: Modal jazz
- Length: 45:34
- Label: Columbia
- Producer: Irving Townsend

Miles Davis chronology
Miles Davis and the Modern Jazz Giants (1959)	Kind of Blue (1959)	Jazz Track (1959)

Kind of Blue is a studio album by the American jazz musician Miles Davis, released on August 17, 1959, through Columbia Records. For this album, Davis led a sextet featuring saxophonists John Coltrane and Julian "Cannonball" Adderley, pianist Bill Evans, bassist Paul Chambers, and drummer Jimmy Cobb, with new band pianist Wynton Kelly replacing Evans on "Freddie Freeloader". The album was recorded at Columbia's 30th Street Studio in New York City in two sessions on March 2 and April 22, 1959.

Influenced in part by Evans, who had been a member of the ensemble in 1958 and was called back for this album, Davis departed further from his early hard bop style in favor of greater experimentation with musical modes, as on the title track of his previous album, Milestones (1958). Basing Kind of Blue entirely on modality, Davis gave each performer a set of scales that encompassed the parameters of their improvisation and style and consequently more creative freedom with melodies; Coltrane later expanded on this modal approach in his own solo career.

Kind of Blue is regarded by many critics as Davis's masterpiece, the greatest jazz album ever recorded, and one of the greatest albums of all time. Its influence on jazz, rock, and classical music has also led writers to describe it as one of the most influential albums ever made. In 2002, it was among the first fifty recordings selected by the Library of Congress for inclusion in the National Recording Registry as "culturally, historically, or aesthetically significant." In 2003, it ranked number 12 on Rolling Stone magazine's list of the "500 Greatest Albums of All Time"; it was repositioned at number 31 in the 2020 revision. The Recording Industry Association of America (RIAA) certified the album quintuple platinum in 2019, representing five million album-equivalent units in the United States. It remained the highest-certified jazz album until August 2026, when Vince Guaraldi's A Charlie Brown Christmas was certified 6x platinum, making Kind of Blue the second-best-selling jazz album in the United States based on RIAA certification.

== Background ==
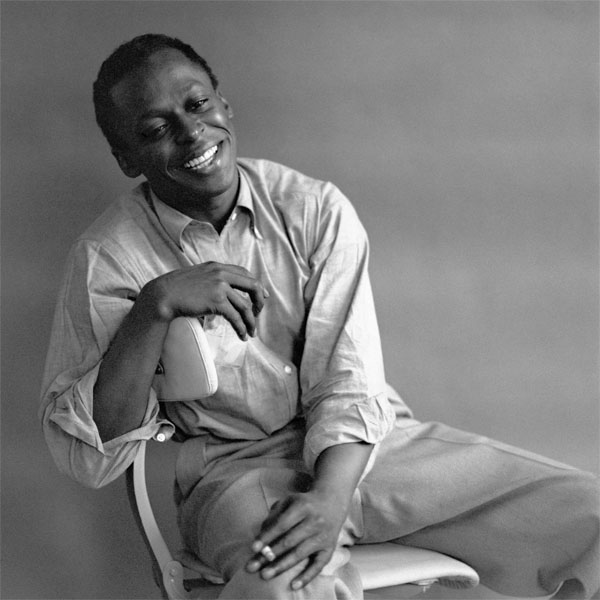
Miles Davis in 1956

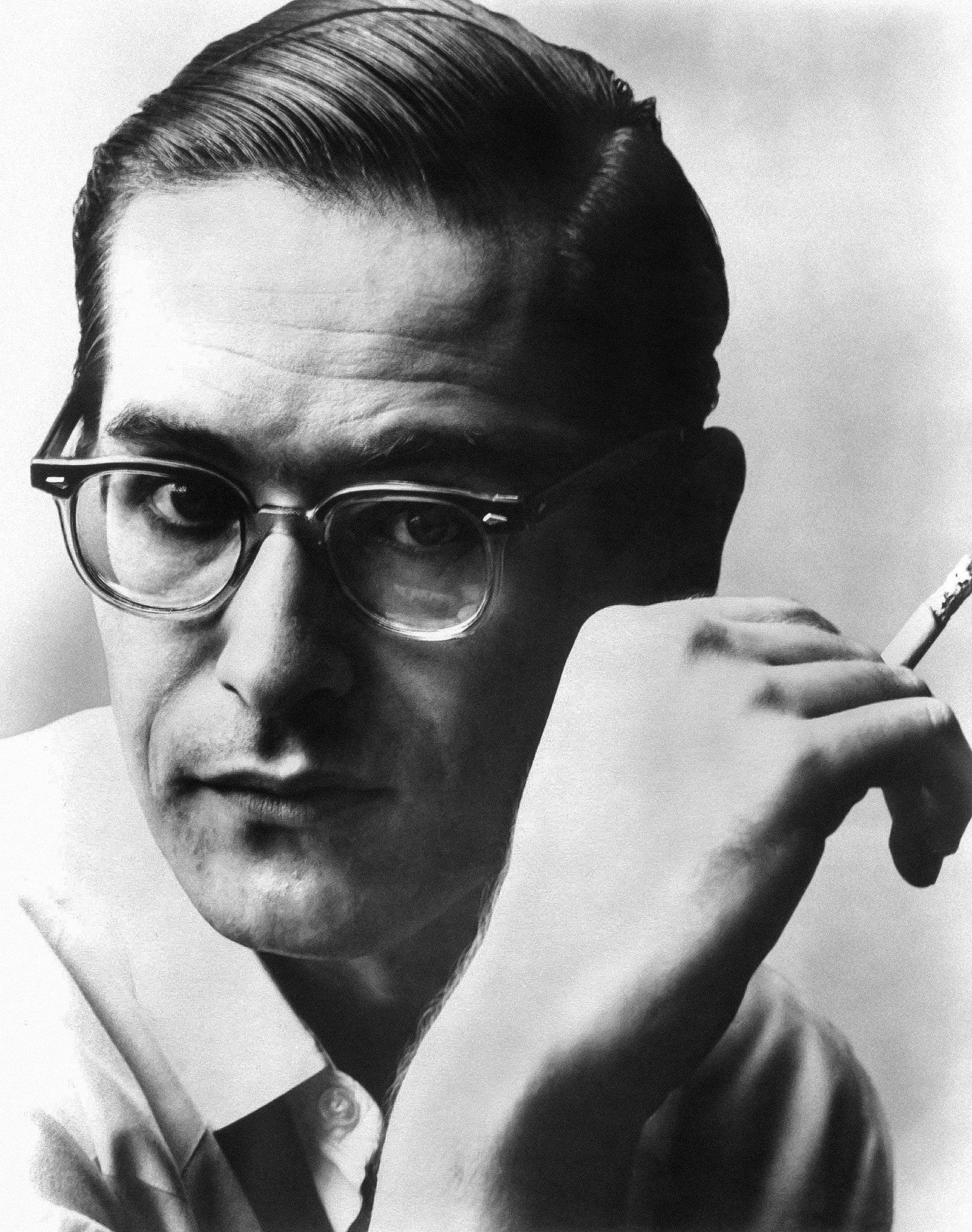
Bill Evans in 1961

By late 1958, trumpeter Miles Davis employed one of the most acclaimed and profitable hard bop bands in the business. Bassist Paul Chambers had been with the group from its beginning in 1955, alto saxophonist Julian "Cannonball" Adderley joined in late 1957, and tenor saxophonist John Coltrane returned in early 1958. Drummer Jimmy Cobb replaced Philly Joe Jones in May 1958, and pianist Wynton Kelly replaced Bill Evans in November 1958.

The Davis band played a mixture of pop standards, blues, and bebop originals by composers such as Charlie Parker, Thelonious Monk, Dizzy Gillespie, Tadd Dameron, and Davis himself. As with all bebop-based jazz, Davis's groups improvised on the chord changes of a given song. Davis was one of many jazz musicians growing dissatisfied with bebop, however, and saw its increasingly complex chord changes as hindering creativity.

In 1953, the composer and theorist George Russell published his Lydian Chromatic Concept of Tonal Organization, which offered an alternative to improvisation based on chords. Abandoning the traditional major and minor key relationships, his concept introduced the idea of chord/scale unity and was the first theory to explore the vertical relationship between chords and scales. These insights helped lead the way to modal jazz. Influenced by Russell's ideas, Davis implemented his first modal composition with the title track of his studio album Milestones (1958). Satisfied with the results, Davis prepared an entire album based on modality. Evans, who had studied and recorded with Russell but had left the Davis group to pursue his own career, was drafted back into the project.

== Recording ==
Kind of Blue was recorded on three-track tape in two sessions at Columbia Records' 30th Street Studio in New York City. On March 2, 1959, the tracks "So What", "Freddie Freeloader", and "Blue in Green" were recorded for side one of the original LP, and on April 22 the tracks "All Blues" and "Flamenco Sketches" were recorded, making up side two.

As was Davis's penchant, he called for almost no rehearsal and the musicians had little idea what they were to record. As described in the original liner notes by pianist Bill Evans, Davis had only given the band sketches of scales and melody lines on which to improvise. Once the musicians were assembled, Davis gave brief instructions for each piece and then set to taping the sextet in studio. While the results were impressive with so little preparation, the persistent legend that the entire album was recorded in one pass is untrue. Only "Flamenco Sketches" yielded a complete take on the first try. That take, which is not the master, was added to the 1997 CD reissue of the album as a bonus track. The five master takes issued were the only other complete takes; an insert for the ending to "Freddie Freeloader" was recorded, but was not used for release or on the issues of Kind of Blue prior to the 1997 reissue.

Pianist Wynton Kelly may not have been happy to see the man he replaced, Bill Evans, back in his old seat. Perhaps to assuage the pianist's feelings, Davis had Kelly play instead of Evans on the album's most blues-oriented number, "Freddie Freeloader." The live album Miles Davis at Newport 1958 documents the sextet during Evans's tenure; however, it is in a hard bop style, rather than the modal approach of Kind of Blue. The more ruminative side of Evans's playing while he was a member of the band can best be heard on his lengthy solo on "My Funny Valentine" from Jazz at the Plaza Vol. I.

=== Production credit ===
Kind of Blue was produced by Columbia staff producer Irving Townsend. However, Davis' subsequent producer, Teo Macero, has incorrectly received partial or full credit. "In the case of Kind of Blue there were two producers: Teo Macero and Irving Townsend", said jazz historian Eric Nisenson. "Macero's role, however, was clearly that of an apprentice and observer." The recording session was also cited by Nisenson as Macero's first experience with "the highs and lows of working with Miles." From Macero's own recollection, his involvement in the recording included "box[ing] everyone in so that there would be a physical closeness among the musicians, not like today when the musicians are spread all over the place." According to High Fidelity, "though his role in Kind of Blue has been disputed", the recording was "made under the auspices" of Macero. However, it is Townsend's voice heard on the session tapes, who became Davis's producer after the departures of George Avakian and Cal Lampley. Macero did not produce Davis until after Townsend took over West Coast production duties for Columbia Records, when Macero took his place. Macero's first Davis production was his next record, Sketches of Spain.

The original LP did not credit a producer. The first release with a producer credit was the 1987 CD, which credited only Macero. However, this was in error; Macero only produced that reissue, not the sessions for the original album. The 1997 MiniDisc reissue credited both Townsend and Macero, but the subsequent 1997, 1999, 2004, 2008, and 2015 reissues all correctly credit only Townsend.

== Composition ==
Kind of Blue is based entirely on modality, diverging from Davis's earlier hard bop style of jazz with its complex chord progression and improvisation. The entire album was a series of modal sketches, with each performer given a set of scales that encompassed the parameters of their improvisation and style. This recording style contrasted with the typical preparation of providing musicians with the complete score or, for improvisational jazz, providing the musicians with a chord progression or series of harmonies.

Modal jazz was not unique to this album. Davis himself had previously used the same method on his 1958 Milestones album, the '58 Sessions, and Porgy and Bess (1958), on which he used modal influences for collaborator Gil Evans's third stream compositions. Modal composition, with its reliance on scales and modes, represented, as Davis called it, "a return to melody". In a 1958 interview with Nat Hentoff of The Jazz Review, Davis elaborated on this form of composition in contrast to the chord progression predominant in bebop, stating:

No chords ... gives you a lot more freedom and space to hear things. When you go this way, you can go on forever. You don't have to worry about changes and you can do more with the [melody] line. It becomes a challenge to see how melodically innovative you can be. When you're based on chords, you know at the end of 32 bars that the chords have run out and there's nothing to do but repeat what you've just done—with variations. I think a movement in jazz is beginning away from the conventional string of chords ... there will be fewer chords but infinite possibilities as to what to do with them.

Bill Evans wrote in the LP liner notes, "Miles conceived these settings only hours before the recording dates." Evans continued with an introduction concerning the modes used in each composition on the album. "So What" consists of two modes: sixteen measures of the first, followed by eight measures of the second, and then eight again of the first. "Freddie Freeloader" is a standard twelve-bar blues form. "Blue in Green" consists of a ten-measure cycle following a short four-measure introduction. "All Blues" is a twelve-bar blues form in 6/8 time. "Flamenco Sketches" consists of five scales, which are each played "as long as the soloist wishes until he has completed the series".

The liner notes list Davis as author of all compositions, but many scholars and fans believe that Bill Evans wrote part or the whole of "Blue in Green" and "Flamenco Sketches". Bill Evans assumed co-credit with Davis for "Blue in Green" when recording it on his Portrait in Jazz album, and the Davis estate acknowledged Evans' authorship in 2002.

== Reception and legacy ==
Retrospective professional reviews
Review scores
Source	Rating
AllMusic	5/5 stars
The Encyclopedia of Popular Music	5/5 stars
Entertainment Weekly	A+
MusicHound Jazz	5/5 stars
The Penguin Guide to Jazz Recordings	4/4 stars
Pitchfork	10/10
Q	5/5 stars
The Rolling Stone Album Guide	5/5 stars
Sputnikmusic	5/5

Since its release on August 17, 1959, Kind of Blue has been regarded by critics as Davis's greatest work. It is his most acclaimed album, and became, along with Davis's 1970 album Bitches Brew, his best-selling record, cementing him as one of the most successful jazz artists in history. Music writer Chris Morris cited Kind of Blue as "the distillation of Davis's art." Cobb said the album "must have been made in heaven".

Kind of Blue has been lauded as one of the most influential albums in the history of jazz. One reviewer has called it a "defining moment of twentieth century music". Several of the pieces from the album have become jazz standards. Kind of Blue is consistently ranked among the greatest albums of all time. In a review of the album, AllMusic senior editor Stephen Thomas Erlewine stated:

Kind of Blue isn't merely an artistic highlight for Miles Davis, it's an album that towers above its peers, a record generally considered as the definitive jazz album, a universally acknowledged standard of excellence. Why does Kind of Blue possess such a mystique? Perhaps because this music never flaunts its genius. ... It's the pinnacle of modal jazz — tonality and solos build from the overall key, not chord changes, giving the music a subtly shifting quality. ... It may be a stretch to say that if you don't like Kind of Blue, you don't like jazz — but it's hard to imagine it as anything other than a cornerstone of any jazz collection.

In 1959, the arrival of Ornette Coleman on the jazz scene via his fall residency at the Five Spot Café, consolidated by the release of his The Shape of Jazz to Come LP in 1959, muted the initial impact of Kind of Blue, a happenstance that irritated Davis greatly. Though Davis and Coleman both offered alternatives to the rigid rules of bebop, Davis would never reconcile himself to Coleman's free jazz innovations, although he would incorporate musicians amenable to Coleman's ideas with his great quintet of the mid-1960s, and offer his own version of "free" playing with his jazz fusion outfits in the 1970s. The influence of Kind of Blue did build, and all of the sidemen from the album went on to achieve success on their own. Evans formed his influential jazz trio with bassist Scott LaFaro and drummer Paul Motian; "Cannonball" Adderley fronted popular bands with his brother Nat; Kelly, Chambers and Cobb continued as a touring unit, recording under Kelly's name as well as in support of Coltrane and Wes Montgomery, among others; and Coltrane went on to become one of the most revered and innovative of all jazz musicians. Even more than Davis, Coltrane took the modal approach and ran with it during his career as a leader in the 1960s, leavening his music with Coleman's ideas as the decade progressed.

Kind of Blue has appeared on professional listings of the greatest albums. In 1994, it was ranked number one in Colin Larkin's Top 100 Jazz Albums. Larkin described it as "the greatest jazz album in the world". In 2002, it was one of 50 recordings chosen for the very first year of induction by the Library of Congress to be added to the National Recording Registry. In selecting the album as number 12 on its 2003 list of the 500 greatest albums of all time, maintaining the rating in a 2012 revised list, Rolling Stone magazine stated: "This painterly masterpiece is one of the most important, influential and popular albums in jazz". The rating descended to number 31 in Rolling Stone's revised list in 2020. On December 16, 2009, the United States House of Representatives passed a resolution honoring the 50th anniversary of Kind of Blue and "reaffirming jazz as a national treasure". It is included in the 2005 book 1001 Albums You Must Hear Before You Die, described by reviewer Seth Jacobson as "a genre-defining moment in twentieth-century music, period".. It was voted number 14 in Colin Larkin's All Time Top 1000 Albums 3rd Edition (2000). The Penguin Guide to Jazz Recordings lists the album as part of its suggested "core collection", and also awards it a crown, indicating a recording of particular merit.

Kind of Blue remains popular with listeners. Between 1991 (when Nielsen SoundScan started tracking sales) and 2016, the album sold 3.6 million copies in the US. In 2019, the Recording Industry Association of America (RIAA) certified the album five-times platinum, indicating five million units recorded there.

=== Influence ===
The album's influence has reached beyond jazz, as musicians of such genres as rock and classical have been influenced by it, while critics have written about it as one of the most influential albums of all time. Many improvisatory rock musicians of the 1960s referred to Kind of Blue for inspiration, along with other Davis albums, as well as Coltrane's modal records My Favorite Things (1961) and A Love Supreme (1965). Guitarist Duane Allman of the Allman Brothers Band said his soloing on songs such as "In Memory of Elizabeth Reed," "comes from Miles and Coltrane, and particularly Kind of Blue. I've listened to that album so many times that for the past couple of years, I haven't hardly listened to anything else." Pink Floyd keyboardist Richard Wright said that the chord progressions on the album influenced the structure of the introductory chords to the song "Breathe" on the album The Dark Side of the Moon (1973). In his book Kind of Blue: The Making of a Miles Davis Masterpiece, writer Ashley Kahn wrote "still acknowledged as the height of hip, four decades after it was recorded, Kind of Blue is the premier album of its era, jazz or otherwise. Its vapory piano introduction is universally recognized". Producer Quincy Jones, one of Davis's longtime friends, wrote: "That [Kind of Blue] will always be my music, man. I play Kind of Blue every day—it's my orange juice. It still sounds like it was made yesterday". Pianist Chick Corea, one of Miles's acolytes, was also struck by its majesty, later stating "It's one thing to just play a tune, or play a program of music, but it's another thing to practically create a new language of music, which is what Kind of Blue did."

Gary Burton, of Berklee College of Music, noted the consistent innovation present throughout the album, stating: "It wasn't just one tune that was a breakthrough, it was the whole record. When new jazz styles come along, the first few attempts to do it are usually kind of shaky. Early Charlie Parker records were like this. But with Kind of Blue [the sextet] all sound like they're fully into it." Along with Time Out by the Dave Brubeck Quartet (1959) and Coltrane's Giant Steps (1960), Kind of Blue has often been recommended by music writers as an introductory jazz album, for similar reasons: the music on both records is very melodic, and the relaxed quality of the songs makes the improvisation easy for listeners to follow, without sacrificing artistry or experimentation. Upon the release of the 50th anniversary collector's edition of the album, a columnist for All About Jazz stated "Kind of Blue heralded the arrival of a revolutionary new American music, a post-bebop modal jazz structured around simple scales and melodic improvisation. Trumpeter/band leader/composer Miles Davis assembled a sextet of legendary players to create a sublime atmospheric masterpiece. Fifty years after its release, Kind of Blue continues to transport listeners to a realm all its own while inspiring musicians to create to new sounds—from acoustic jazz to post-modern ambient—in every genre imaginable." Renowned hip-hop artist and rapper Q-Tip reaffirmed the album's reputation and influence when discussing the significance of Kind of Blue, stating "It's like the Bible—you just have one in your house." The singer Bilal names it among his 25 favorite albums and "an important record" for him. The 2014 album Blue by Mostly Other People Do the Killing is a note-for-note reproduction of Kind of Blue.

The Kind of Blue musicians appeared together in further recorded ventures through the 1960s. Davis had made a rare post-1953 sideman appearance in 1958 on Adderley's Somethin' Else album; Evans and Adderley collaborated on the latter's LP Know What I Mean? from 1961. Kelly and Chambers backed Hank Mobley on Soul Station in 1960, and Evans and Chambers played on the sessions for The Blues and the Abstract Truth by Oliver Nelson in 1961. The rhythm section of Kelly, Chambers, and Cobb played on Cannonball Adderley Quintet in Chicago, supported Benny Golson on Turning Point and Coltrane for Coltrane Jazz and one track on Coltrane's landmark Giant Steps, which featured Chambers throughout. That trio stayed with Davis for the recordings Someday My Prince Will Come and the live sets at the Blackhawk and at Carnegie Hall.

=== Davis in retrospect ===
Late in his life, from the electric period on, Davis repeatedly disregarded his earlier work, such as the music of Birth of the Cool or Kind of Blue. In Davis's view, remaining static stylistically was the wrong option.

"So What" or Kind of Blue, they were done in that era, the right hour, the right day, and it happened. It's over .... What I used to play with Bill Evans, all those different modes, and substitute chords, we had the energy then and we liked it. But I have no feel for it anymore—it's more like warmed-over turkey.

— Interview with Ben Sidran, 1986.

When Shirley Horn insisted, in 1990, that Davis reconsider playing the gentle ballads and modal tunes of his Kind of Blue period, he demurred: "Nah, it hurts my lip."

== Release history ==
1986 Columbia Jazz Masterpieces compact disc reissue cover

Kind of Blue was released as a 12-inch vinyl record, in both stereo and mono, and was reissued multiple times. On some editions, the label switched the order for the two tracks on side two, "All Blues" and "Flamenco Sketches". The album was remastered many times during the compact disc era, including in 1982 by CBS/Sony Japan catalog number 35DP 62 and the 1986 Columbia Jazz Masterpieces reissue. The significant 1992 remaster corrected the original recording speed of side one, which had caused all prior releases to be slightly off-pitch. The 1997 reissue added the alternative take of "Flamenco Sketches". In 2005, a DualDisc release included the original album, a digital remastering in 5.1 Surround Sound and LPCM Stereo, and a 25-minute documentary Made in Heaven about the making and influence of Kind of Blue. Kind of Blue was re-issued on a rare 24-carat gold CD collectors version. A two-disc CD box set "50th Anniversary Collector's Edition" was released on September 30, 2008, by Columbia and Legacy.

The album was released in other audio formats, which are only available second hand.

- Two-track open-reel tape (US only), Columbia GCB 60, from which "Freddie Freeloader" and "Flamenco Sketches" were omitted to reduce cost. This release was on the market less than a year and was discontinued some time after July 1961, after Sketches of Spain had been released as four-track only. Sonically, it was reportedly better than the four-track counterpart that replaced it. The rumor that the two-track version was the only one to be issued at correct speed for the tracks from the first album side is false. It was not issued at the correct speed.
- Four-track open-reel tape (US only), Columbia CQ 379, as the complete five-track album. This release replaced the two-track release and remained in the Columbia catalog for a few years. Some tracks are available on other reel tapes issued current at the time of or following the original release of the album, as by Various Artists. None issued were at the correct speed. "All Blues" is included on the Greatest Hits album.
- Armed Forces Radio and Television Service 16-inch transcription discs. These are monaural and the track on side P-6925 marked "Flamenco Sketches" actually holds "All Blues". None issued were at the correct speed.
- Philips Compact Cassette versions of the original album prior to the Jazz Masterpiece remaster, and of the 1987 Jazz Masterpiece remaster. Neither are at the correct speed.
- MiniDisc, Columbia CM 40579 (US) from a master prior to 1997, but not the Jazz Masterpiece remaster. It was unavailable by the end of the 1990s when production of Jazz Masterpiece series had ceased. It was not issued at the correct speed.

== Track listing ==
=== Original release ===
Side one
No.	Title	Writer(s)	Length
1.	"So What"	Miles Davis	9:22
2.	"Freddie Freeloader"	Davis	9:46
3.	"Blue in Green"	Davis, Bill Evans	5:27
Total length:			24:35

Side two
No.	Title	Writer(s)	Length
1.	"All Blues"	Davis	11:33
2.	"Flamenco Sketches"	Davis, Evans	9:26
Total length:			20:59 45:34

=== 1997 reissue bonus track ===
No.	Title	Writer(s)	Length
6.	"Flamenco Sketches" (alternate take)	Miles Davis, Bill Evans	9:32
Total length:			45:34 55:06

=== 2008 reissue bonus tracks ===
No.	Title	Length
7.	"Freddie Freeloader" (studio sequence 1)	0:53
8.	"Freddie Freeloader" (false start)	1:27
9.	"Freddie Freeloader" (studio sequence 2)	1:30
10.	"So What" (studio sequence 1)	1:55
11.	"So What" (studio sequence 2)	0:13
12.	"Blue in Green" (studio sequence)	1:58
13.	"Flamenco Sketches" (studio sequence 1)	0:45
14.	"Flamenco Sketches" (studio sequence 2)	1:12
15.	"All Blues" (studio sequence)	0:18
Total length:		55:06 1:02:18

=== 2008 bonus disc ===
No.	Title	Writer(s)	Length
1.	"On Green Dolphin Street"	Bronisław Kaper, Ned Washington	9:50
2.	"Fran-Dance"	Miles Davis	5:49
3.	"Stella by Starlight"	Victor Young, Ned Washington	4:46
4.	"Love for Sale"	Cole Porter	11:49
5.	"Fran-Dance" (alternate take)	Miles Davis	5:53
6.	"So What" (recorded live at Kurhaus, The Hague, April 9, 1960)	Miles Davis	17:29
Total length:			55:36

== Personnel ==
Credits are taken from the album's liner notes.

- Miles Davis – trumpet
- Julian "Cannonball" Adderley – alto saxophone except on "Blue in Green" and live version of "So What"
- John Coltrane – tenor saxophone
- Bill Evans – piano except on "Freddie Freeloader" and live version of "So What"
- Wynton Kelly – piano on "Freddie Freeloader" and live version of "So What"
- Paul Chambers – double bass
- Jimmy Cobb – drums
- Fred Plaut – recording engineer (not credited on liner notes)

== Charts ==
=== Weekly charts ===
Weekly chart performance for Kind of Blue
Chart (1959–2026)	Peak position
Belgian Albums (Ultratop Flanders)	21
Belgian Albums (Ultratop Wallonia)	161
Croatian International Albums (HDU)	6
French Albums (SNEP)	29
French Jazz Albums (SNEP)	1
German Albums (Offizielle Top 100)	100
Hungarian Physical Albums (MAHASZ)	13
Irish Albums (IRMA)	42
Italian Albums (FIMI)	45
Norwegian Albums (VG-lista)	40
Polish Albums (ZPAV)	82
Portuguese Albums (AFP)	26
Spanish Albums (Promusicae)	7
Swedish Albums (Sverigetopplistan)	58
Swedish Jazz Albums (Sverigetopplistan)	1
Swiss Albums (Schweizer Hitparade)	17
UK Albums (Official Charts)	63
UK Jazz & Blues Albums (Official Charts)	1
US Top Jazz Albums (Billboard)	2
US Top Traditional Jazz Albums (Billboard)	2
US Vinyl Albums (Billboard)	3

=== Monthly charts ===
Monthly chart performance for Kind of Blue
Chart (2016–2019)	Peak position
German Jazz Albums (Offizielle Top 100)	2

=== Year-end charts ===
Chart (2001)	Position
Canadian Jazz Albums (Nielsen SoundScan)	6

Chart (2002)	Position
Canadian R&B Albums (Nielsen SoundScan)	63

Chart (2025)	Position
Croatian International Albums (HDU)	29

== Certifications ==
Region	Certification	Certified units/sales
Australia (ARIA)	2× Platinum	140,000^{^}
Belgium (BRMA)	Gold	25,000^{*}
Denmark (IFPI Danmark)	Gold	10,000^{‡}
France (SNEP)	2× Gold	200,000^{*}
Germany (BVMI)	Gold	250,000^{‡}
Italy (FIMI) sales since 2009	2× Platinum	100,000^{‡}
Netherlands (NVPI)	Silver	
Poland (ZPAV)	2× Platinum	40,000^{‡}
United Kingdom (BPI) 1997 release	2× Platinum	600,000^{‡}
United States (RIAA)	5× Platinum	5,000,000^{‡}
^{*} Sales figures based on certification alone.^{^} Shipments figures based on certification alone.^{‡} Sales+streaming figures based on certification alone.

== See also ==
- 1959 in jazz

== Bibliography ==
- Blumenthal, Bob (2001). "Liner Notes". Miles Davis at Newport 1958. Columbia/Legacy CK85202.
- Brackett, Nathan; Hoard, Christian (2004). The New Rolling Stone Album Guide. Completely revised and updated 4th edition. Simon and Schuster. ISBN 0-7432-0169-8.
- Cook, Richard; Morton, Brian (2002). The Penguin Guide to Jazz on CD. 6th edition. Penguin. ISBN 0-14-051521-6.
- Kahn, Ashley (2001). Kind of Blue: The Making of the Miles Davis Masterpiece. foreword by Cobb, Jimmy, Da Capo Press. ISBN 0-306-81067-0.
- Palmer, Robert (1997). "Liner Notes to 1997 Reissue". Kind of Blue (CD). New York, NY: Sony Music Entertainment Inc. / Columbia Records.
- Williams, Richard (2010). The Blue Moment: Miles Davis's Kind of Blue and the Remaking of Modern Music. Norton. W. W. Norton & Company. ISBN 978-0-393-07663-9.
