= Stella by Starlight =

1944 jazz standard

Song
- Published: 1946 by Famous Music
- Composer: Victor Young
- Lyricist: Ned Washington

"Stella by Starlight" is a popular jazz standard with music by Victor Young that was drawn from thematic material composed for the main title and soundtrack of the 1944 Paramount Pictures film The Uninvited. Appearing in the film's underscore as well as in source music as an instrumental theme song without lyrics, it was turned over to Ned Washington, who wrote the lyrics for it in 1946.

At one point in the film, the main character, Rick (Ray Milland) tells Stella (Gail Russell) that he is playing a serenade, "To Stella by Starlight".

== Recording history ==
"Stella by Starlight" is one of the most popular jazz standards, ranked number 10 by the website jazzstandards.com. Its May 1947 recording by Harry James and his orchestra reached the 21st place in the pop charts. Two months later, the recording by Frank Sinatra with Axel Stordahl and his orchestra also rose to the 21st position.

Alto saxophonist Charlie Parker, accompanied by a large studio orchestra including strings, made the first jazz recording of the song in January 1952. This was followed by a recording by tenor saxophonist Stan Getz in December 1952, trumpeter Chet Baker in 1954, a piano version by Bud Powell, and a rendition by the big band of Stan Kenton, featuring bass trombonist George Roberts. Nat King Cole recorded an instrumental version for his 1955 album The Piano Style of Nat King Cole.

A recording by Miles Davis was included on his 1958 album Jazz Track. Davis revived the song in 1963, performing it live many times through 1965. Other jazz recordings have been made by Red Garland, Maynard Ferguson, Earl Grant, Joe Pass, Bill Evans, Art Blakey and the Jazz Messengers, Lou Donaldson, Charlie Rouse, Dexter Gordon and Keith Jarrett. Vocal versions have been recorded by Billy Eckstine, Dick Haymes, Ray Charles, Anita O'Day, Helen Reddy, Tony Bennett, Ella Fitzgerald, Frank Sinatra, Italian singer Mina in 1964, and many others. Al Hirt released a version on his 1961 album, The Greatest Horn in the World. In 1993, guitarist Larry Coryell included the song on his album Fallen Angel. Caterina Valente included on 1961's Super-Fonics.

The Italian-born American tenor/actor Sergio Franchi had strong connections with this romantic ballad. His first venue was the song's performance on Meredith Willson's CBS variety show (Texaco Star Parade) broadcast on June 5, 1964. Franchi then recorded the song on his 1965 RCA Victor album Live at The Coconut Grove. The liner notes for this album stated that Willson was so impressed with Franchi's performance that he (Willson) presented the singer with his copy of Victor Young's original score. Franchi later performed the song on a 1965 broadcast of CBS's The Ed Sullivan Show.

== Recordings ==
Selections from Victor Young's score for The Uninvited were recorded in 1997 by the Moscow Symphony Orchestra, conducted by William T. Stromberg. The recording was released on CD by Naxos Records, and is available on iTunes.
