= Modal jazz =

Sub-genre of jazz

- Cultural origins: Mid-1950s, United States
- Typical instruments: Clarinet; saxophone; trumpet; trombone; piano; double bass; drums; keyboard; electric guitar; acoustic guitar

Modal jazz is jazz that makes use of musical modes, often modulating among them to accompany the chords instead of relying on one tonal center used across the piece.

Though exerting influence to the present, modal jazz was most popular in the 1950s and 1960s, as evidenced by the success of Miles Davis's 1958 composition "Milestones" and 1959 album Kind of Blue, and John Coltrane's quartet from 1960 to 1965. Other performers of modal jazz include Chick Corea, Bill Evans, Herbie Hancock, Joe Henderson, Bobby Hutcherson, Pharoah Sanders, Woody Shaw, Wayne Shorter, McCoy Tyner, and Larry Young.

== History ==
In bebop as well as in hard bop, musicians use chords to provide the background for solos. A piece starts out with a theme that introduces a series of chords for the solos. These chords repeat throughout the whole piece, while the soloists play new, improvised themes over the repeated chord progression. By the 1950s, improvising over chords had become such a dominant part of jazz that sidemen at recording dates were sometimes given nothing more than a list of chords to play from.

Mercer Ellington has stated that Juan Tizol conceived the melody to "Caravan" in 1936 as a result of his days studying music in Puerto Rico, where they could not afford much sheet music so the teacher would turn the music upside down after they had learned to play it right-side up. This "inversion" technique led to a modal sound throughout Tizol's work.

Sun Ra reportedly rehearsed a small group consisting of Harold Ousley, Vernel Fournier, and Wilbur Ware in 1950 that played original songs that were modal in which the melody was based on a single chord or vamp – ten years before this approach became popular in jazz.

Saxophonist Wayne Shorter has noted that the 1953 composition "Glass Enclosure" by pianist Bud Powell was one of the earliest jazz compositions to make use of Lydian chords, based on the Lydian mode that was not widely used in jazz until about a decade later. Powell's 1951 Un Poco Loco uses the Lydian chords and even uses Lydian chords stacked on top of each implying a polytonality (D major 7 over C major 7: CEGBDF#AC#) with the improvisation based on alternating Lydian-ish polytonality and an altered dominant chord.

Towards the end of the 1950s, spurred by the experiments of composer and bandleader George Russell, musicians began using a modal approach. They chose not to write their pieces using conventional chord changes, but instead using modes. Musicians employing this technique include Miles Davis, Freddie Hubbard, Bill Evans, Herbie Hancock, and Wayne Shorter.

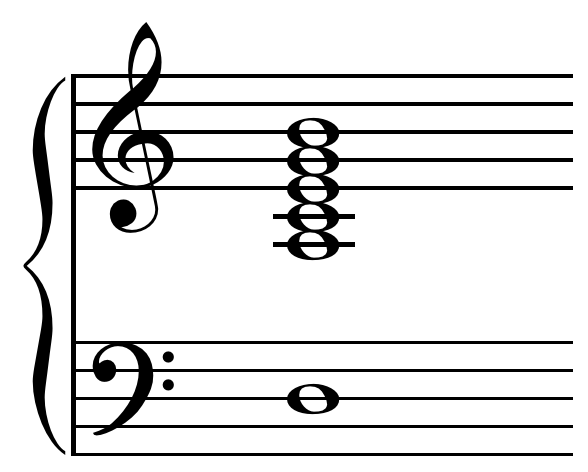
Opening chord to "Maiden Voyage": minor eleventh chord (Am9/D). Using D Dorian.

Among the significant compositions of modal jazz were "So What" by Miles Davis and "Impressions" by John Coltrane. "So What" and "Impressions" follow the same AABA structure and were in D Dorian for the A sections and modulated a half step up to E-flat Dorian for the B section. The Dorian mode is the natural minor scale with a raised sixth. Other compositions include Davis's "Flamenco Sketches", Bill Evans's "Peace Piece", and Shorter's "Footprints".

Davis recorded one of the best-selling jazz albums of all time in this modal framework. Kind of Blue is an exploration of the possibilities of modal jazz. Although his explorations of modal jazz were sporadic throughout the 1960s, he included several of the tunes from Kind of Blue in the repertoire of his second quintet.

Coltrane took the lead in extensively exploring the limits of modal improvisation and composition with his quartet, featuring Elvin Jones (drums), McCoy Tyner (piano), and Reggie Workman and Jimmy Garrison (bass). Several of Coltrane's albums from the period are recognized as examples of modal jazz: Africa/Brass (1961), Live! at the Village Vanguard (1962), Crescent (1964), A Love Supreme (1964), and Meditations (1965). Coltrane's compositions from this period such as "India", "Chasin' the Trane", "Crescent", and "Impressions" have entered the jazz repertoire, along with his interpretations of standards like Richard Rodgers's "My Favorite Things", and the traditional "Greensleeves".
