= Panthalassa: The Music of Miles Davis 1969–1974 =

Remix album by Miles Davis
- Released: February 16, 1998
- Recorded: 1969–1974
- Genre: Jazz fusion, ambient
- Length: 59:38
- Label: Sony

Miles Davis chronology
Live Around the World (1996)	Panthalassa: The Music of Miles Davis 1969–1974 (1998)	Love Songs (1999)

Panthalassa: The Music of Miles Davis 1969–1974 is a remix album of recordings by American jazz trumpeter Miles Davis, as arranged and mixed by Bill Laswell. It is subtitled "Reconstruction and Mix Translation by Bill Laswell". The album was released on February 16, 1998, by Sony Records.

It contains compositions from Davis's prior albums, including In a Silent Way (1969), On the Corner (1972), and Get Up With It (1974); combined with elements of ambient music and chill music. The album was composed as a dark, continuous tone poem divided by four sections of Davis' jazz fusion recordings.

Panthalassa received generally positive reviews from music critics and sold well, charting at number four on the Billboard Top Jazz Albums.

== Composition and recordings ==
An ambient, jazz fusion album, Panthalassa is divided into four sections and composed as dark and continuous chronological tone poem of remixed songs recorded by Davis during his "electric" period. Laswell was offered access to the original multi-track tapes and occasionally deleted the rhythm sections, brought up obscured instruments, added Indian and electronic droning sounds from elsewhere on the tapes, constructed moody transitions, and premiered previously unreleased passages from Davis' sessions.

The album's first track was constructed as a reordered and truncated version of Davis' 1969 jazz fusion album In a Silent Way. It is followed by 16 minutes of remixed music from the On the Corner sessions and approximately half-an-hour of music from Get Up with It.

The On the Corner section of Panthalassa showcased two new songs—the elaborate rock and funk of "What If" and the ominous march-like "Agharta Prelude Dub". According to Bob Belden, "What If" was recorded on June 2, 1972, by Davis with a personnel including saxophonist Carlos Garnett, guitarists John McLaughlin and David Creamer, keyboardists Chick Corea, Herbie Hancock, and Harold Williams, sitar player Collin Walcott, bassist Michael Henderson, and percussionists Billy Hart (cowbell), Jack DeJohnette (drums), Don Alias (conga), and Badal Roy (tabla). Paul Tingen surmised that Creamer, Garnett, and Henderson had their parts overdubbed into the track after it had been recorded. "Agharta Prelude Dub" was titled by Laswell after Davis' 1975 live album Agharta, on which its melody appeared. It contains for the most part an electric trumpet solo by Davis over a slow drum rhythm, and makes repeated reference to the telltale augmented fifth interval of Take the A Train. Davis scholar Jan Lohmann believed the track had been recorded on November 29, 1972, most likely by Davis, Garnett, Henderson, Roy, drummer Al Foster, percussionist James Mtume, keyboardist Cedric Lawson, and electric sitar player Khalil Balakrishna.

== Critical reception ==
Professional ratings
Review scores
Source	Rating
AllMusic	4/5 stars
Encyclopedia of Popular Music	4/5 stars
Entertainment Weekly	B+
Pitchfork	8.7/10
The Penguin Guide to Jazz Recordings	4/4 stars
The Village Voice	A

Panthalassa received positive reviews from critics. The Wire called it an "ambient fusion power force which breathed new life into the originals without detracting from Davis's artistic intentions", crediting Laswell for "teasing out the music's spiritual dimension". Steve Futterman from Entertainment Weekly believed the record's "most radical quality is the reverence that Laswell pays to his sources". Whether the remixes are "rhythmically bustling or meditative", Futterman wrote, they "seethe with Davis' still-startling visions". Joshua Klein of The A.V. Club said the reordered songs did not "sound out of context" and commended Laswell for giving more exposure to these unappreciated "masterpieces". AllMusic's Richard S. Ginell wrote that "despite the altered sonic landscape, Laswell accurately evokes in turns the lonely, exquisitely gleaming, nightmarish, despairing moods that Davis was exploring prior to his 1975 retirement". Robert Christgau declared he would play the album as often as the electric-period Davis records In a Silent Way and Jack Johnson (1971). He wrote in The Village Voice that listeners unfamiliar with Davis' fusion albums will find it to be "a passport to provisional utopia" in Panthalassa:

"Metastructures condensed, themes highlighted, beats punched up by a master tinkerer who's loved them forever, the transcendent buzz of electric Miles nevertheless remains undulant, unpredictable, perverse—and so relaxed about getting where it's not actually going that newcomers will find it hard to imagine how much more unhurriedly it might arrive."

In a year-end list for the Pazz & Jop critics poll, Christgau named Panthalassa the sixth best record of 1998. When first hearing "Shhh/Peaceful" on Panthalassa, Geoff Dyer said he realized the impact such compositions had on ambient and chill-out music.

== Track listing ==
No.	Title	Music	Length
1.	"In a Silent Way; Shhh/Peaceful; It's About That Time"	Miles Davis, Joe Zawinul	15:20
2.	"Black Satin; What If; Agharta Prelude Dub"	Davis	16:06
3.	"Rated X; Billy Preston"	Davis	14:34
4.	"He Loved Him Madly"	Davis	13:38

== Personnel ==
- Bill Laswell — Mixing Translation, Reconstruction
- Bob Belden — Research, Transfers
- Steven Berkowitz — A&R
- Robert Musso — Engineer
- Diabel Faye — Assistant, Assistant Engineer
- Michael Fossenkemper — Mastering
- Amiri Baraka — Liner Notes
- Umar Bin Hassan — Liner Notes
- David Henderson — Liner Notes
- David Toop — Liner Notes
- Bill Murphy — Text Coordination
- Russell Mills — Art Direction, Artwork, Design, Images, Photography
- Tom Terrell — Cover Photo, Photography
- Urve Kuusik — Photography
- Sandy Speiser — Photography
- Michael Webster — Design, Image Photography

=== Original recordings ===
- Miles Davis — Trumpet, Organ
- Wayne Shorter — Saxophone
- Carlos Garnett — Saxophone
- Dave Liebman — Saxophone
- Joe Zawinul — Keyboards
- Chick Corea — Keyboards
- Herbie Hancock — Keyboards
- Cedric Lawson — Keyboards
- John McLaughlin — Guitar
- Reggie Lucas — Guitar
- David Creamer — Guitar
- Pete Cosey — Guitar
- Dominique Gaumont — Guitar
- Collin Walcott — Sitar
- Dave Holland — Bass
- Michael Henderson — Electric bass
- Harold Williams — Keyboards
- Khalil Balakrishna — Sitar
- Tony Williams — Drums
- Jack DeJohnette — Drums
- Al Foster — Drums
- Badal Roy — Tabla
- Don Alias — Percussion
- Mtume — Percussion, Rhythm Box
