= The Complete Bitches Brew Sessions =

Box set by Miles Davis
- Released: 24 November 1998; 11 May 2004 (reissue)
- Recorded: August 19, 1969 – February 6, 1970
- Genres: Jazz-fusion, avant-garde jazz
- Length: 264:40
- Label: Columbia/Legacy
- Producers: Teo Macero (orig. recordings), Bob Belden, Michael Cuscuna

The Miles Davis Series chronology
(Box 5); The Complete In a Silent Way Sessions (2001)	The Complete Bitches Brew Sessions (1998)	(Box 7); The Complete Jack Johnson Sessions (2003)

Alternative cover
- Reissue longbox

The Complete Bitches Brew Sessions is a four-disc box set by jazz trumpeter Miles Davis compiling recordings between August 19, 1969, and February 6, 1970—including the 1970 double album Bitches Brew in its entirety—and released on Columbia/Legacy on November 24, 1998.

== Background ==
The title of the box set is somewhat of a misnomer: outside of the Bitches Brew tracks themselves, none of the other tracks were recorded during the same August 1969 sessions that resulted in Bitches Brew. Furthermore, additional material recorded for, but not used in Bitches Brew (mainly rehearsal takes and unedited performances of the six album tracks), is not included in this set.

When questioned by Paul Tingen why most of the material in fact was not recorded either for or at the same sessions as the original album, re-issue producer Bob Belden clarified how the team's thought process went. According to him and the engineer, all the songs Miles Davis recorded between August 1969 and early February 1970 used very similar line-ups to those on Bitches Brew, and the main thing they all had in common was the emphasis on keyboards. Every song in the set includes two to three keyboard players, most often Chick Corea, Joe Zawinul and Herbie Hancock. It was not until late February 1970 that Davis refined his concept by dropping the multiple electric pianists for a more guitar-heavy sound. Those following sessions were collected on The Complete Jack Johnson Sessions.

The box set includes some tracks that had never been previously released, one of which, the Wayne Shorter composition "Feio," has since appeared as a bonus track on late compact disc reissues of Bitches Brew. A few of the other tracks in the box set had previously appeared on the albums Live-Evil, Big Fun, and Circle in the Round.

The Complete Bitches Brew Sessions is number "6" in a series of Miles Davis box sets issued by Columbia/Legacy (the numbering scheme refers to the chronological order of the original recordings, not the release order of the box sets themselves). The set was reissued on 11 May 2004 with new packaging. Mosaic Records released the 6 LP set.

== Reception ==
Professional ratings
Review scores
Source	Rating
AllMusic	4.5/5 stars
The Penguin Guide to Jazz Recordings	3/4 stars

The AllMusic review by critic John Bush states:

The music is simply fabulous—the simultaneous birth and peak of jazz-rock/fusion, with a host of major players (John McLaughlin, Chick Corea, Joe Zawinul, Wayne Shorter, Jack DeJohnette) and many innovations.... Though the unreleased selections are distinctly inferior to those released on Bitches Brew, "Yaphet," "Corrado," and "Trevere" are intriguing jam sessions that reveal much about the creative process between Davis and producer Teo Macero during recording.... The music here is another glowing testament to Miles' importance to the development of jazz in 1969, as in 1949.

== Track listing ==
All songs written by Miles Davis, except where noted.

Disc one
No.	Title	Writer(s)	Original release	Length
1.	"Pharaoh's Dance"	Joe Zawinul	Bitches Brew	20:06
2.	"Bitches Brew"		Bitches Brew	26:58
3.	"Spanish Key"		Bitches Brew	17:34
4.	"John McLaughlin"		Bitches Brew	4:22

Disc two
No.	Title	Writer(s)	Original release	Length
1.	"Miles Runs the Voodoo Down"		Bitches Brew	14:01
2.	"Sanctuary"	Wayne Shorter	Bitches Brew	10:56
3.	"Great Expectations"	Davis; Zawinul	Big Fun	13:45
4.	"Orange Lady"	Zawinul	Big Fun	13:50
5.	"Yaphet"		Big Fun* (Note: CD reissue bonus track)	9:39
6.	"Corrado"		† (Note: ^{†}previously unreleased)	13:11

Disc three
No.	Title	Writer(s)	Original release	Length
1.	"Trevere"		Big Fun*	5:55
2.	"The Big Green Serpent"		†	3:35
3.	"The Little Blue Frog" (alternate take)		†	12:15
4.	"The Little Blue Frog"		Big Fun'*	9:09
5.	"Lonely Fire"		Big Fun	21:09
6.	"Guinnevere"	David Crosby	Circle in the Round	21:07

Disc four
No.	Title	Writer(s)	Original release	Length
1.	"Feio"	Shorter	Bitches Brew'*	11:49
2.	"Double Image"	Zawinul	†	8:25
3.	"Recollections"	Zawinul	Big Fun*	18:54
4.	"Take It or Leave It"	Zawinul	†	2:13
5.	"Medley: Gemini/Double Image"	Davis; Zawinul	Live-Evil	5:52

== Personnel ==
Collective listing for all recording sessions.

- Miles Davis – Trumpet, Vocals
- Don Alias – Percussion, Conga, Drums
- Khalil Balakrishna – Sitar
- Harvey Brooks – Bass, Electric bass
- Ron Carter – Bass
- Billy Cobham – Drums, Triangle
- Chick Corea – Electric piano
- Jack DeJohnette – Drums
- Steve Grossman – Soprano saxophone
- Herbie Hancock – Electric piano
- Dave Holland – Bass, Electric bass
- Bennie Maupin – Bass clarinet
- John McLaughlin – Electric guitar
- Airto Moreira – Berimbau, Cuíca, Percussion
- Bihari Sharma – Tabla, Tamboura
- Wayne Shorter – Soprano saxophone
- Juma Santos (Jim Riley) – Conga, Shaker
- Lenny White – Drums
- Larry Young – Organ, Celeste, Electric piano
- Joe Zawinul – Electric piano
- Frank Laico – Engineer [Original Recording] (tracks: 2-3 to 2-6)
- Stan Tonkel – Engineer [Original Recording] (tracks: 1-1 to 2-2, 3-1 to 4-5)
