= The Complete Jack Johnson Sessions =

Box set by Miles Davis
- Released: September 30, 2003
- Recorded: November 19, 1969 – June 4, 1970
- Studio: 30th Street Studio in New York City
- Genres: Jazz-rock; funk
- Length: 352:26
- Label: Columbia/Legacy

The Miles Davis Series chronology
(Box 6); The Complete Bitches Brew Sessions (1998)	The Complete Jack Johnson Sessions (2003)	(Box 8); The Complete On the Corner Sessions (2007)

Professional ratings
Review scores
Source	Rating
AllMusic	4.5/5 stars
Encyclopedia of Popular Music	3/5 stars
Mojo	5/5 stars
The Observer	5/5 stars
Pitchfork Media	8.6/10
Q	4/5 stars
The Rolling Stone Album Guide	4.5/5 stars
Uncut	4/5 stars
The Village Voice	B+
The Penguin Guide to Jazz Recordings	4/4 stars

The Complete Jack Johnson Sessions were recorded in April 1970 by Miles Davis, and released in September 2003. These sessions formed the basis for the 1971 album Jack Johnson, as well as some of the studio portions of Live-Evil.

== Track listing ==
All compositions by Miles Davis except where noted.

Disc 1
No.	Title	Recording date and studio	Length
1.	"Willie Nelson (Take 2)**"	February 18, 1970 at Columbia 30th Street Studio B	6:41
2.	"Willie Nelson (Take 3)*"	February 18, 1970 at Columbia 30th Street Studio B	10:21
3.	"Willie Nelson (Insert 1)**"	February 18, 1970 at Columbia 30th Street Studio B	6:33
4.	"Willie Nelson (Insert 2)**"	February 18, 1970 at Columbia 30th Street Studio B	5:22
5.	"Willie Nelson (Remake Take 1)*"	February 27, 1970 at Columbia Studio B	10:45
6.	"Willie Nelson (Remake Take 2)"	February 27, 1970 at Columbia Studio B	10:17
7.	"Johnny Bratton (Take 4)*"	February 27, 1970 at Columbia Studio B	8:18
8.	"Johnny Bratton (Insert 1)*"	February 27, 1970 at Columbia Studio B	6:39
9.	"Johnny Bratton (Insert 2)*"	February 27, 1970 at Columbia Studio B	5:20
10.	"Archie Moore*"	March 3, 1970 at Columbia Studio B	4:45

Disc 2
No.	Title	...	Length
1.	"Go Ahead John (Part One)**"	March 3, 1970 at Columbia Studio B	13:07
2.	"Go Ahead John (Part Two A)**"	March 3, 1970 at Columbia Studio B	7:00
3.	"Go Ahead John (Part Two B)**"	March 3, 1970 at Columbia Studio B	10:06
4.	"Go Ahead John (Part Two C)**"	March 3, 1970 at Columbia Studio B	3:38
5.	"Go Ahead John (Part One Remake)**"	March 3, 1970 at Columbia Studio B	11:04
6.	"Duran (Take 4)*"	March 17, 1970 at Columbia Studio C	5:37
7.	"Duran (Take 6)"	March 17, 1970 at Columbia Studio C	11:20
8.	"Sugar Ray*"	March 20, 1970 at Columbia Studio B	6:16

Disc 3
No.	Title	...	Length
1.	"Right Off (Take 10)"	April 7, 1970 at Columbia Studio B	11:09
2.	"Right Off (Take 10A)**"	April 7, 1970 at Columbia Studio B	4:33
3.	"Right Off (Take 11)**"	April 7, 1970 at Columbia Studio B	5:58
4.	"Right Off (Take 12)**"	April 7, 1970 at Columbia Studio B	8:49
5.	"Yesternow (Take 16)*"	April 7, 1970 at Columbia Studio B	9:49
6.	"Yesternow (New Take 4)**"	April 7, 1970 at Columbia Studio B	16:02
7.	"Honky Tonk (Take 2)**"	May 19, 1970 at Columbia Studio C	10:04
8.	"Honky Tonk (Take 5)*"	May 19, 1970 at Columbia Studio C	11:29

Disc 4
No.	Title	...	Length
1.	"Ali (Take 3)*"	May 19, 1970 at Columbia Studio C	6:50
2.	"Ali (Take 4)*"	May 19, 1970 at Columbia Studio C	10:16
3.	"Konda**"	May 21, 1970 at Columbia Studio C	16:29
4.	"Nem Um Talvez (Take 17)*" (Hermeto Pascoal)	May 27, 1970 at Columbia Studio C	2:50
5.	"Nem Um Talvez (Take 19)*" (Hermeto Pascoal)	May 27, 1970 at Columbia Studio C	2:54
6.	"Little High People (Take 7)*" (Hermeto Pascoal)	June 3, 1970 at Columbia Studio C	6:52
7.	"Little High People (Take 8)*" (Hermeto Pascoal)	June 3, 1970 at Columbia Studio C	9:28
8.	"Nem Um Talvez (Take 3)*" (Hermeto Pascoal)	June 3, 1970 at Columbia Studio C	4:36
9.	"Nem Um Talvez (Take 4A)" (Hermeto Pascoal)	June 3, 1970 at Columbia Studio C	2:04
10.	"Selim (Take 4B)" (Hermeto Pascoal)	June 3, 1970 at Columbia Studio C	2:15
11.	"Little Church (Take 7)*" (Hermeto Pascoal)	June 4, 1970 at Columbia Studio C	3:18
12.	"Little Church (Take 10)" (Hermeto Pascoal)	June 4, 1970 at Columbia Studio C	3:15

Disc 5
No.	Title	...	Length
1.	"The Mask (Part One)*"	June 4, 1970 at Columbia Studio C	7:47
2.	"The Mask (Part Two)*"	June 4, 1970 at Columbia Studio C	15:45
3.	"Right Off"	April 7, 1970 at Columbia Studio B	26:54
4.	"Yesternow"	April 7, 1970 at Columbia Studio B ("Yesternow") + February 18, 1970 at Columbia Studio B ("Willie Nelson") + February 18, 1969 at CBS 30th Street Studio NYC ("Shhh/Peaceful")	25:36

- "Right Off" includes an excerpt from an unaccompanied trumpet solo from November 19 or 18, 1969
- "Yesternow" includes excerpts from the unaccompanied November 1969 trumpet solo with arco bass overdubbed, "Shhh/Peaceful" excerpt from February 18, 1969 session In a Silent Way and the unaccompanied November 1969 trumpet solo with the following overdubs: orchestra arranged by Teo Macero and narration by Brock Peters
- "Willie Nelson (Remake Take 2)" and "Duran (Take 6)" were originally released on Directions.
- All takes of "Go Ahead John" were released as one assembled track on Big Fun.
- "Honky Tonk (Take 2)" was partially released on Get Up With It and Live-Evil.
- "Konda" was partially released on Directions.
- "Nem Um Talvez (Take 4A)", "Selim (Take 4B)" and "Little Church (Take 10)" were released on Live-Evil.

(*) Previously Unissued
(**) Previously Unissued in Full

== Personnel ==
- Miles Davis – trumpet
- Bennie Maupin – bass clarinet
- Steve Grossman – soprano saxophone
- Wayne Shorter – soprano saxophone
- Chick Corea – electric piano, organ, electric piano with ring modulator
- Herbie Hancock – organ, Electric Piano
- Keith Jarrett – electric piano, electric piano with wah wah
- Sonny Sharrock – electric guitar, echoplex
- John McLaughlin – electric guitar
- Dave Holland – electric bass, double bass
- Michael Henderson – electric bass
- Gene Perla – electric bass
- Ron Carter – double bass
- Jack DeJohnette – drums
- Billy Cobham – drums
- Lenny White – drums
- Don Alias – percussion
- Airto Moreira – percussion, berimbau, cuica
- Hermeto Pascoal – voice, drums
