= On the Corner =

Studio album by Miles Davis
- Released: October 11, 1972
- Recorded: June 1, June 6 and July 7, 1972
- Studio: Columbia 52nd Street (New York City)
- Genres: Jazz-funk; avant-funk; jazz fusion; psychedelic funk; avant-garde jazz
- Length: 54:44
- Label: Columbia
- Producer: Teo Macero

Miles Davis chronology
Live-Evil (1971)	On the Corner (1972)	Black Beauty (1973)

On the Corner is a studio album by the American jazz trumpeter, bandleader, and composer Miles Davis. It was recorded in June and July 1972 and released on October 11 of that year by Columbia Records. The album continued Davis' exploration of jazz fusion, and explicitly drew on the funk of Sly Stone and James Brown, the experimental music of Karlheinz Stockhausen, the free jazz of Ornette Coleman, and the work of collaborator Paul Buckmaster.

Recording sessions for the album featured a changing lineup of musicians including bassist Michael Henderson, guitarist John McLaughlin, and keyboardists Chick Corea and Herbie Hancock, with Davis playing his trumpet through a wah-wah pedal. Davis and producer Teo Macero then spliced and edited various takes into compositions. The album's packaging did not credit any musicians, in an attempt to make the instruments less discernible to critics. Its artwork features Corky McCoy's cartoon designs of urban African-American characters.

On the Corner was in part an effort by Davis to reach a younger African-American audience who had largely left jazz for funk and rock music; instead, due to Columbia's lack of target marketing, it was one of Davis' worst-selling albums, and was scorned by jazz critics and many of Davis' contemporaries at the time of its release. It would be Davis's last studio album of the 1970s conceived as a complete work; subsequently, he recorded haphazardly and focused on live performance before temporarily retiring in 1975.

Critical and popular reception of On the Corner has improved dramatically with the passage of time. Many outside the jazz community have since called it an innovative musical statement anticipating subsequent developments in styles including funk, jazz, post-punk, electronica, and hip-hop. In 2007, On the Corner was reissued as part of the six-disc box set The Complete On the Corner Sessions.

== Background ==
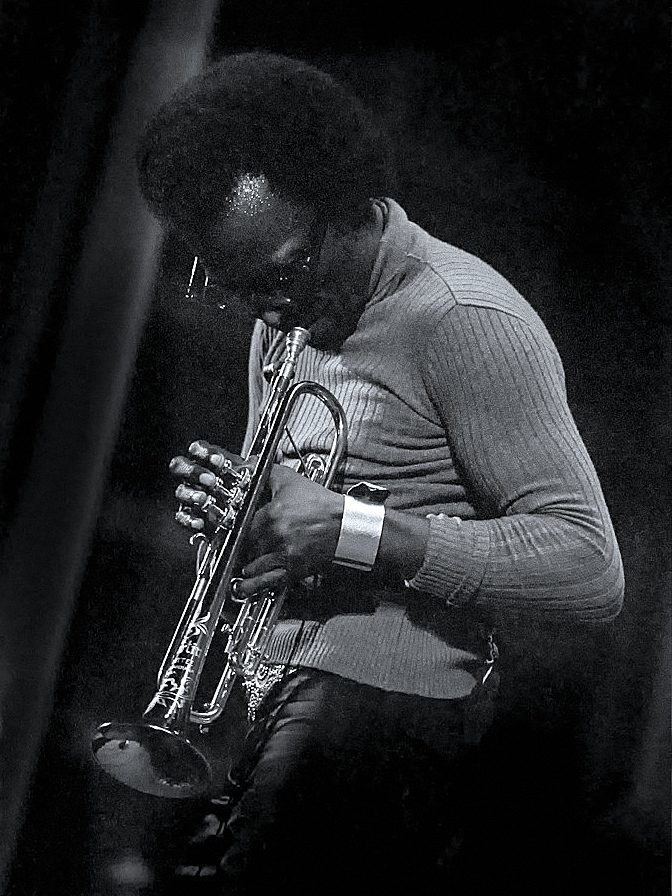
Davis performing in Germany, 1971

Following his turn to jazz fusion in the late 1960s and the release of rock- and funk-influenced albums such as Bitches Brew (1970) and Jack Johnson (1971), Miles Davis received backlash from the jazz community. Critics accused him of abandoning his talents and pandering to commercial trends, though his recent albums had been commercially unsuccessful by his standards. Other jazz contemporaries, such as Herbie Hancock, Cecil Taylor, and Gil Evans, defended Davis; the latter stated that "jazz has always used the rhythm of the time, whatever people danced to". In early 1972, Davis began conceiving On the Corner as an attempt to reconnect with a young African-American audience which had largely forsaken jazz for the funk of artists such as Sly and the Family Stone and James Brown. In an interview with Melody Maker, Davis stated:

"I don't care who buys the record so long as they get to the black people so I will be remembered when I die. I'm not playing for any white people, man. I wanna hear a black guy say 'Yeah, I dig Miles Davis.'"

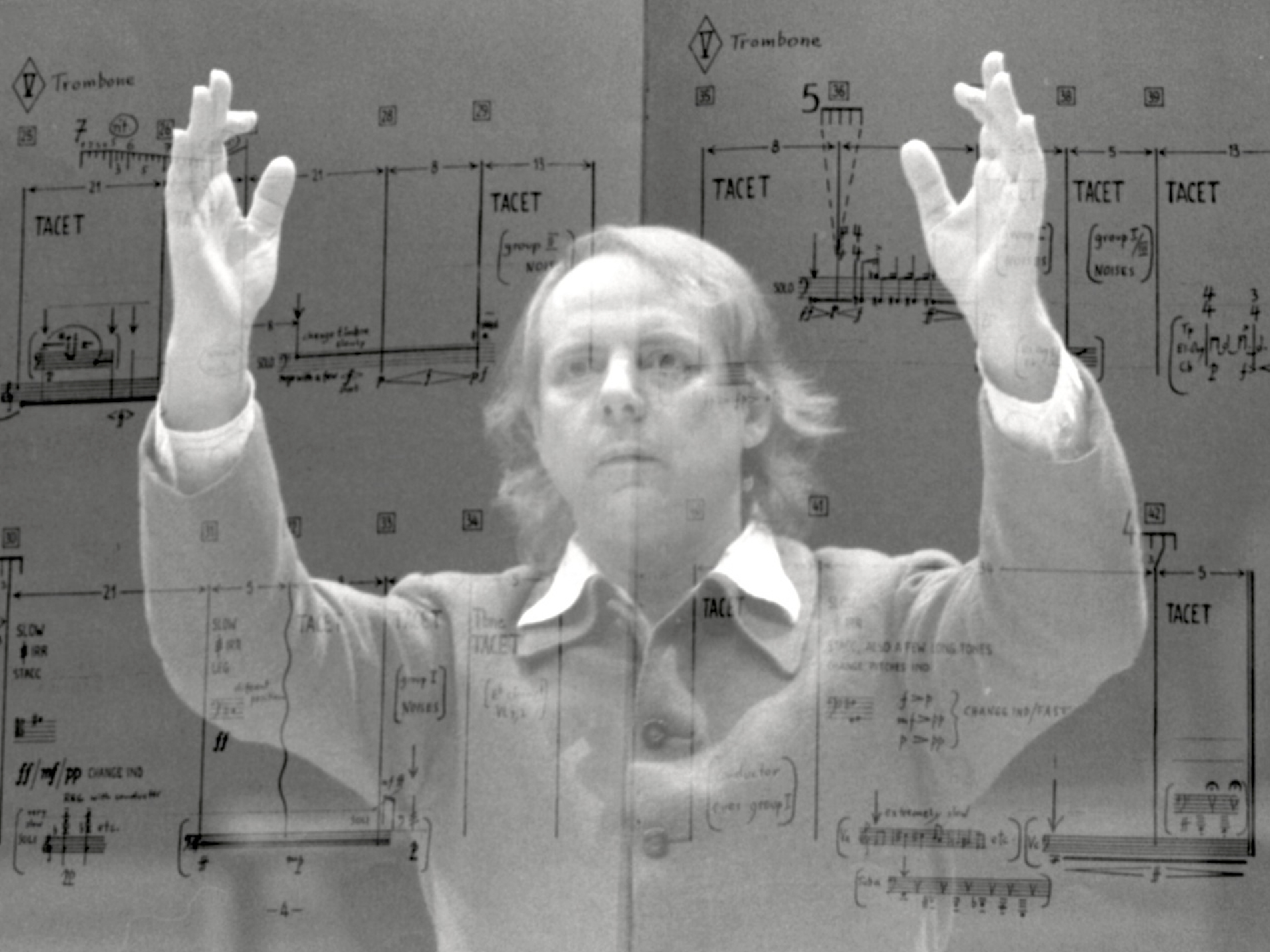
On the Corner was partly inspired by the musical concepts of Karlheinz Stockhausen (pictured in 1980).

Davis also cited German experimental composer Karlheinz Stockhausen as an influence, in particular his forays into electronic music and tape manipulation. Davis was first introduced to Stockhausen's work in 1972 by collaborator Paul Buckmaster, and the trumpeter reportedly kept a cassette recording of Stockhausen's electroacoustic composition Hymnen (1966–67) in his Lamborghini Miura. The electronic sound processing found in Hymnen and Telemusik (1966) and the development of musical structures by expanding and minimizing processes based on preconceived principles, as featured in Plus-Minus and other Stockhausen works from the 1960s and early 1970s, appealed to Davis. Davis began to apply these ideas to his music by adding and taking away instrumentalists and other aural elements throughout a recording to create a progressively changing soundscape. He later wrote in his autobiography:

I had always written in a circular way and through Stockhausen I could see that I didn't want to ever play again from eight bars to eight bars, because I never end songs: they just keep going on. Through Stockhausen I understood music as a process of elimination and addition.

The work of Buckmaster, who played electric cello on the album and contributed some arrangements, and the harmolodic theory of avant-garde jazz saxophonist Ornette Coleman, whom Davis had previously disparaged, would also influence the album; Davis later described On the Corner as "Stockhausen plus funk plus Ornette Coleman." Using this conceptual framework, Davis reconciled ideas from contemporary classical music, jazz, and rhythm-based dance music.

== Recording and production ==
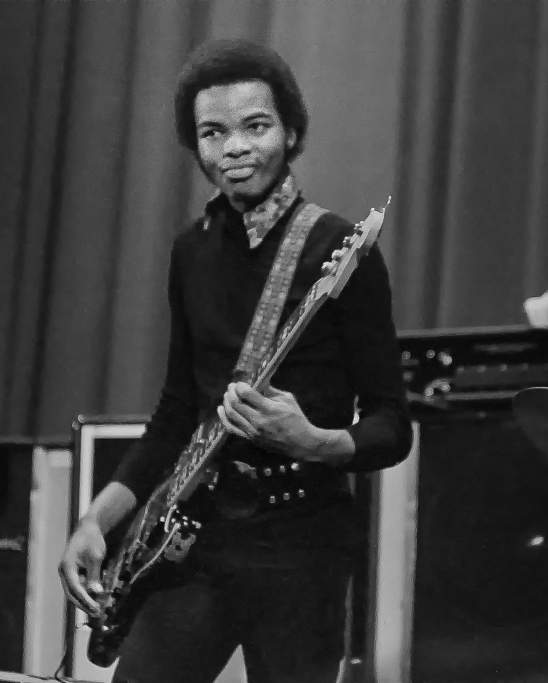
Bassist Michael Henderson was a fixture throughout the recording sessions.

Recording sessions for On the Corner began in June 1972. Both sides of the record consisted of repetitive drum and bass grooves based around a one-chord modal approach, with the final cut edited down from hours of jams featuring changing lineups underpinned by bassist Michael Henderson. Other musicians involved in the recording included guitarist John McLaughlin, drummers Jack DeJohnette and Billy Hart, and keyboardists Herbie Hancock and Chick Corea. On the Corner utilized three keyboardists, as on Bitches Brew, while pairing Hart—who had also played in Hancock's Mwandishi-era band—with DeJohnette and two percussionists. Bennie Maupin, Hancock's woodwind player at the time, played bass clarinet, and Dave Liebman was recruited as saxophonist. Jazz historian Robert Gluck later discussed the performances:

"The recording functions on two layers: a relatively static, dense thicket of rhythmic pulse provided by McLaughlin's percussive guitar attack, the multiple percussionists, and Henderson's funky bass lines, plus keyboard swirls on which the horn players solo. Segments of tabla and sitar provide a change of mood and pace. Aside from 'Black Satin,' most of the material consists of intense vamps and rhythmic layering."

Compared to Davis' previous recordings, On the Corner found him playing the trumpet scarcely. The album also saw his producer, Teo Macero, employ tape editing procedures which he had first used on Davis' 1969 album In a Silent Way to combine various takes into a single cohesive work. Macero's tape editing technique was informed by his experiences with New York-based avant-garde and electronic composers such as Edgard Varèse and Vladimir Ussachevsky in the 1950s and 1960s. The tape editing process also allowed Macero and Davis to overdub and add effects after the sessions. Some of the musicians expressed misgivings about the unconventional musical direction of the sessions; Liebman opined that "the music appeared to be pretty chaotic and disorganized," while Buckmaster called it his "least favorite Miles album."

== Packaging ==
The album cover featured an illustration by cartoonist Corky McCoy depicting ghetto caricatures. The packaging only featured one stylized photograph of Davis, and was originally released with no musician credits, leading to ongoing confusion about which musicians appeared on the album. Davis later admitted to doing this intentionally: "I didn't put those names on On the Corner specially for that reason, so now the critics have to say, 'What's this instrument, and what's this?' ... I'm not even gonna put my picture on albums anymore. Pictures are dead, man. You close your eyes and you're there."

== Reception ==
Contemporary professional reviews
Review scores
Source	Rating
DownBeat	2/5 stars

On the Corner was panned by most critics and jazz musicians; according to Davis biographer Paul Tingen, it became "the most vilified and controversial album in the history of jazz" soon after its release. Saxophonist Stan Getz proclaimed: "That music is worthless. It means nothing; there is no form, no content, and it barely swings." Jazz Journal critic Jon Brown wrote that "it sounds merely as if the band had selected a chord and decided to worry hell out of it for three-quarters of an hour," concluding that "I'd like to think that nobody could be so easily pleased as to dig this record to any extent." Eugene Chadbourne, writing for jazz magazine Coda, described On the Corner as "pure arrogance." In his 1974 biography of Davis, critic Bill Coleman described the album as "an insult to the intellect of the people."

Rock journalist Robert Christgau later suggested that jazz critics were not receptive to On the Corner "because the improvisations are rhythmic rather than melodic" and Davis played the organ more than his trumpet. Regarding the appeal it held for rock critics, he praised "Black Satin" but expressed reservations about the absence of a "good" beat elsewhere on the album. Ian MacDonald of the NME declared the album "monumentally boring". In a positive review for Rolling Stone, Ralph J. Gleason found the music very "lyrical and rhythmic" while praising the dynamic stereo recording and calling Davis "a magician". He concluded by saying that "the impact of the whole is greater than the sum of any part."

The album's commercial performance was as limited as that of Davis's albums since Bitches Brew, topping the Billboard jazz chart but only peaking at No. 156 in the more heterogeneous Billboard 200. Tingen wrote that "predictably, this impenetrable and almost tuneless concoction of avant-garde classical, free jazz, African, Indian and acid funk bombed spectacularly, leading to decades in the wilderness. As far as the jazzers were concerned, it completed Davis's journey from icon to fallen idol."

== Legacy and reappraisal ==
Retrospective professional reviews
Review scores
Source	Rating
AllMusic	5/5 stars
Alternative Press	4/5
Christgau's Record Guide	B+
DownBeat	5/5 stars
The Encyclopedia of Popular Music	3/5 stars
MusicHound Jazz	4/5 stars
The Penguin Guide to Jazz	2.5/4 stars
The Rolling Stone Album Guide	3.5/5 stars
The Rolling Stone Jazz Record Guide	3/5 stars

Despite remaining outside the purview of the mainstream jazz community, On the Corner has undergone a positive critical reassessment in subsequent decades; according to Tingen, many critics outside jazz have characterized it as "a visionary musical statement that was way ahead of its time". In 2014, Stereogum hailed it as "one of the greatest records of the 20th Century, and easily one of Miles Davis' most astonishing achievements," noting its mix of "funk guitars, Indian percussion, dub production techniques, [and] loops that predict hip hop." According to Alternative Press, On the Corner is an "essential masterpiece" that envisioned much of modern popular music, "representing the high water mark of [Davis'] experiments in the fusion of rock, funk, electronica and jazz". Fact characterized the album as "a frenetic and punky record, radical in its use of studio technology," adding that "the debt that the modern dance floor owes the pounding abstractions of On the Corner has yet to be fully understood." Writing for The Vinyl Factory, Anton Spice described it as "the great great grandfather of hip-hop, IDM, jungle, post-rock and other styles drawing meaning from repetition."

On the Corner was featured on the 2007 box set The Complete On the Corner Sessions, alongside tracks from Davis' subsequent compilation albums Big Fun and Get Up with It and previously unreleased recordings from the same period. Reviewing the box set in The Wire, critic Mark Fisher wrote that "[t]he passing of time often neutralises and naturalises sounds that were once experimental, but retrospection has not made On the Corner's febrile, bilious stew any easier to digest." Stylus Magazine's Chris Smith wrote that the record anticipated musical principles that abandoned a focus on a single soloist in favor of collective playing: "At times harshly minimal, at others expansive and dense, it upset quite a few people. You could call it punk." On the Corner was cited by SF Weekly as prefiguring subsequent funk, jazz, post-punk, electronica, and hip hop. According to AllMusic's Thom Jurek, "the music on the album itself influenced – either positively or negatively – every single thing that came after it in jazz, rock, soul, funk, hip-hop, electronic and dance music, ambient music, and even popular world music, directly or indirectly." BBC Music reviewer Chris Jones expressed the view that the music and production techniques of On the Corner "prefigured and in some cases gave birth to nu jazz, jazz-funk, experimental jazz, ambient and even world music." Pitchfork described the album as "longing, passion and rage milked from the primal source and heading into the dark beyond."

Fact named On the Corner the 11th best album of the 1970s, while Pitchfork named the album the 30th best album of that decade. The Wire named On the Corner one of its "100 Records That Set the World on Fire (While No One Was Listening)". According to the magazine's David Stubbs, On the Corner was "Miles's most extreme foray into what was often pejoratively dismissed as jazz rock and is still regarded by many critics today as a grotesque, period aberration". John F. Szwed also wrote of the album in The Wire:

Jazz musicians hated it, critics bemoaned Miles's fall from grace, and since Columbia failed to market it as a pop record, it died in the racks. Even now, when Davis's jazz rock recordings are being reissued to great acclaim, On the Corner remains lost in time. Still, this record might well be the most radical break with the past of all of Davis's many breaks. Dense with rhythm and conceptually enriched with noises, his trumpet's role mixed down to that of a journeyman, the melody reduced to recycled Minimalist patterns, Davis broke every rule enforced by the jazz police. Yet today ... we hear that Davis was laying the foundations for drum 'n' bass, [trip hop], Jungle, and all the other musics of repetition to come.

Despite the record's influence on numerous artists outside of jazz, "the mainstream jazz community still won't touch On the Corner with a barge pole", according to Tingen, "and whatever remains of jazz-rock continues to be too deeply in thrall of the pyrotechnics aspect of such 1970s bands as Mahavishnu Orchestra to take any notice of On the Corner's repetitive funk, which was the antithesis of virtuosity." For its fusion of jazz harmonies with funk rhythms and rock instrumentation, On the Corner was regarded by both Davis biographer Jack Chambers and music essayist Simon Reynolds as exemplary of the trumpeter's jazz-rock music, and Mick Wall viewed it as a "jazz-rock cornerstone". According to NPR Music's Felix Contreras, On the Corner was among several albums from 1972 that "blurred the lines between rock and jazz", along with I Sing the Body Electric by Weather Report and Santana's Caravanserai. Jazz scholar Paul Lopes cited the album as an example of jazz-funk, and ethnomusicologist Rob Bowman called it "a milestone" in the genre, while Barry Miles believed it was a jazz-funk album that also "qualifies as prog rock because no one at the time knew what to call it." Pat Thomas from Juxtapoz magazine wrote in retrospect that the record explored psychedelic funk. On the Corner was also viewed by Dave Segal of The Stranger as a "landmark fusion album" and by Vice journalist Jeff Andrews as one of jazz fusion's two greatest albums alongside Bitches Brew. While noting its inclusiveness and transcendence of a variety of musical genres, Howard Mandel regarded the album as both jazz and avant-garde music, while Stubbs said "this riff beast is a hybrid of funk and rock but is more atavistic, more avant garde than anything conventionally dreamt of by either genre".

== Track listing ==
All compositions written by Miles Davis.

Side one
No.	Title	Recording date	Length
1.	"On the Corner" "New York Girl" "Thinkin' One Thing and Doin' Another" "Vote for Miles"	June 1, 1972	2:58; 1:32; 6:45; 8:45
2.	"Black Satin"	June 6, 1972 & July 7, 1972	5:16
Total length:			25:16

Side two
No.	Title	Recording date	Length
1.	"One and One"	June 6, 1972	6:09
2.	"Helen Butte" "Mr. Freedom X"	June 6, 1972	16:06; 7:13
Total length:			29:28

Notes:

- "Black Satin" was released as a single under the name "Molester".
- Some CD releases split the sections of tracks 1 and 4 into individual tracks.
- The Complete On the Corner Sessions boxed set track list gives June 1, 1972 as the recording date of "Black Satin," but this is a mistake. The track consists of sections of "Helen Butte/Mr. Freedom X", recorded on June 6, with overdubs recorded on July 7.

== Personnel ==
- Miles Davis – electric trumpet with wah-wah pedal
- Michael Henderson – bass guitar with wah-wah pedal
- Don Alias – drums, percussion
- Jack DeJohnette – drums
- Billy Hart – drums
- Al Foster – drums
- James Mtume – percussion
- Carlos Garnett – soprano saxophone, tenor saxophone
- Dave Liebman – soprano saxophone, tenor saxophone
- Bennie Maupin – bass clarinet
- Chick Corea – Fender Rhodes electric piano, ARP Axxe synthesizer
- Herbie Hancock – Fender Rhodes electric piano, organ
- Harold Ivory Williams Jr. – Fender Rhodes electric piano
- Lonnie Liston Smith – Fender Rhodes electric piano
- Cedric Lawson – organ
- Dave Creamer – electric guitar
- John McLaughlin – electric guitar
- Khalil Balakrishna – electric sitar
- Collin Walcott – electric sitar
- Paul Buckmaster – electric cello with wah-wah pedal
- Badal Roy – tabla

== Charts ==
Chart performance for On the Corner
Chart	Peak position (1972)
US Billboard 200	156
