= The Complete On the Corner Sessions =

2007 compilation album by Miles Davis

Box set by Miles Davis
- Released: September 25, 2007
- Recorded: March 9, 1972–May 5, 1975
- Studios: Columbia Studio E and B, New York City
- Genres: Jazz-funk, jazz fusion
- Length: 407:13
- Label: Columbia/Legacy
- Producer: Teo Macero

The Miles Davis Series chronology
(Box 7); The Complete Jack Johnson Sessions (2003)	The Complete On the Corner Sessions (2007)

Professional ratings
Review scores
Source	Rating
Allmusic	5/5 stars
BBC	(favorable)
Music Box	5/5 stars
Pitchfork Media	(9.2/10)
PopMatters	8/10
Rolling Stone	4/5 stars
The Penguin Guide to Jazz Recordings	3/4 stars

The Complete On the Corner Sessions is a posthumous box set by American jazz musician Miles Davis, released in the US on September 25, 2007, by Columbia Records and in the UK on September 29 on Legacy Recordings. Like other Davis box sets, the included material is taken from a wider chronology of sessions than the dates which actually produced the titular album. The Complete On the Corner Sessions compiles material from 1972 through 1975 which, due to lineup changes Davis made throughout the era, features over two dozen musicians.

Columbia has released a series of eight box sets containing studio recordings from the 1950s to the 1970s. These contain material not available on other Columbia albums. Following The Complete In a Silent Way Sessions, The Complete Bitches Brew Sessions, and The Complete Jack Johnson Sessions, this release includes the funk/jazz fusion album On the Corner. His band was made up of musicians trained not only in the basics of jazz, but on the newer sounds of James Brown and Sly Stone.

The box set includes more than six hours of music. Twelve tracks haven't been previously issued; another five tracks are previously unissued in full. They cover sixteen sessions from On the Corner, Big Fun, and Get Up with It until Davis's mid-seventies retirement. Miles is joined in these recordings by Chick Corea, Herbie Hancock, John McLaughlin, Jack DeJohnette, Billy Hart, and many others. The 6-CD deluxe edition also contains a 120-page full-color booklet with liner notes and essays by producer Bob Belden, journalist Tom Terrell, and arranger/composer Paul Buckmaster as well as rare photographs and new illustrations.

== Recording history ==
As with many of the Miles Davis boxed sets, the overall title is rather misleading. The On the Corner boxed set covers three years of sessions, from March 1972 to May 1975, and contains music with different styles, concepts, approaches and personnel. Similarly, The Complete Bitches Brew Sessions includes all of the sessions Davis recorded between August 1969 and February 1970, although the actual Bitches Brew sessions took place over just three days in August 1969.

The sessions for the 1972 album On the Corner were recorded in June and September 1972. On the Corner was scorned by established jazz critics at the time of its release and was one of Davis' worst-selling recordings. Its critical standing has improved with the passage of time; today it is seen as a strong forerunner of the musical techniques of hip hop, drum and bass, and electronic music.

Davis claimed that On the Corner was an attempt to connect with a young black audience which had largely forsaken jazz for rock and funk. While there is a discernible rock and funk influence in the timbres of the instruments employed and the overall rhythms, the album was also a culmination of sorts of the musique concrète approach that Davis and producer Teo Macero started using in the late 1960s. (Macero had studied with Otto Luening at Columbia University's Computer Music Center). Both sides of the original album On the Corner were based around simple, repetitive drum and bass grooves (the track delineations on the original album were arbitrary). Melodic parts, such as from trumpet, saxophone, guitar and keyboards, were often selectively snipped from hours of jam sessions and overlaid atop the rhythms in the editing process. These techniques were developed in the 1940s and '50s by avant-garde composers but were uncommon in 1970s jazz and pop. Now, refined via the use of computers and digital audio equipment, such recording and editing methods are standard amongst producers of electronically based music.

Davis also cited as inspirations during this era the contemporary composer Karlheinz Stockhausen (who was later falsely rumored to have recorded with the trumpeter in the late 1970s) and Paul Buckmaster (who played electric cello on the album and contributed some arrangements).

== Content ==
The box set contains over three hours of previously unreleased material. On the November 6, 1974 date, guitarist Pete Cosey replaced Al Foster on drums on "Hip-Skip". Later that day he returned to guitar for "What They Do", playing alongside Dominique Gaumont. "Minnie" is based on the Minnie Ripperton song "Loving You", and is considered to have an almost commercial disco sound, the most mainstream-sounding track of the collection.

The Complete On the Corner Sessions also contains seven of the eight tracks that made up the 1974 double album Get Up with It. (The other track, "Honky Tonk", appears in unedited form on The Complete Jack Johnson Sessions.) Not included in the set is the "Molester" 7-inch single (a different mix of "Black Satin"), although the record label is included in the booklet.

== Track listing ==
All tracks are written by Miles Davis.

Disc one
No.	Title	Recording date	Length
1.	"On the Corner" (unedited master)	June 1, 1972	19:25
2.	"On the Corner" (take 4)	June 1, 1972	5:15
3.	"One and One" (unedited master)	June 6, 1972	17:55
4.	"Helen Butte/Mr. Freedom X" (unedited master)	June 6, 1972	23:37
5.	"Jabali"	June 12, 1972	11:04

Disc two
No.	Title	Recording date	Length
1.	"Ife"	June 12, 1972	21:33
2.	"Chieftain"	August 23, 1972	14:37
3.	"Rated X"	September 6, 1972	6:50
4.	"Turnaround"	November 29, 1972	17:16
5.	"U-turnaround"	November 29, 1972	8:27

Disc three
No.	Title	Recording date	Length
1.	"Billy Preston"	December 8, 1972	12:33
2.	"The Hen"	January 4–5, 1973	12:55
3.	"Big Fun/Holly-wuud" (take 2)	July 26, 1973	6:32
4.	"Big Fun/Holly-wuud" (take 3)	July 26, 1973	7:07
5.	"Peace"	July 26, 1973	7:01
6.	"Mr Foster"	September 17, 1973	15:14

Disc four
No.	Title	Recording date	Length
1.	"Calypso Frelimo"	September 17, 1973	32:08
2.	"He Loved Him Madly"	June 19, 1974	32:17

Disc five
No.	Title	Recording date	Length
1.	"Maiysha"	October 7, 1974	14:51
2.	"Mtume"	October 7, 1974	15:08
3.	"Mtume" (take 11)	October 7, 1974	6:51
4.	"Hip-Skip"	November 6, 1974	18:59
5.	"What They Do"	November 6, 1974	11:44
6.	"Minnie"	May 5, 1975	3:53

Disc six
No.	Title	Recording date	Length
1.	"Red China Blues"	March 9, 1972	4:06
2.	"On the Corner/New York Girl/Thinkin' of One Thing and Doin' Another/Vote for Miles"	June 1, 1972	19:54
3.	"Black Satin"	June 6 and July 7, 1972	5:15
4.	"One and One"	June 6, 1972	6:09
5.	"Helen Butte/Mr. Freedom X" (master)	June 6, 1972	23:14
6.	"Big Fun"	July 26, 1973	2:32
7.	"Holly-wuud"	July 26, 1973	2:54
Total length:			407:13

Notes:

- "Ife" originally released on Big Fun (1974).
- "Rated X", "Billy Preston", "Calypso Frelimo", "He Loved Him Madly", "Maiysha", "Mtume" and "Red China Blues" originally released on Get Up with It (1974).
- "Jabali", "U-Turnaround", "The Hen", and "Big Fun/Holly-wuud" (take 3) later released on Turnaround (2023).
- Disc six, tracks 2–5 consist of the full original On the Corner album.
- The boxed set track list gives June 1, 1972 for the recording of "Black Satin," but this is a mistake. The backing tracks were recorded on June 6, titled "Helen Butte/Mr Freedom X", and overdubs which actually turned it into "Black Satin," were added on July 7 of that year.

== Personnel ==
=== Collective ===
- Miles Davis - electric trumpet with wah wah, organ, electric piano
- Badal Roy - tabla
- Bennie Maupin - bass clarinet
- Carlos Garnett - alto and tenor saxophone
- Don Alias - percussion
- Chick Corea - synthesiser, electric piano
- Collin Walcott - sitar
- Dave Liebman - soprano saxophone, flute
- David Creamer - electric guitar
- Harold I. Williams - electric piano, synthesiser
- Herbie Hancock - organ, electric piano, synthesiser
- Jabali Billy Hart - drums, bongos
- Jack DeJohnette - drums
- James Mtume Foreman - percussion
- John McLaughlin - electric guitar
- Lonnie Liston Smith - organ
- Michael Henderson - electric bass with wah wah
- Paul Buckmaster - cello
- Cedric Lawson - electric piano
- Reggie Lucas - electric guitar
- Khalil Balakrishna - electric sitar
- Al Foster - drums
- Pete Cosey - electric guitar
- Dominique Gaumont - electric guitar
- Sonny Fortune - flute

=== By year ===
1972

- Miles Davis — electric trumpet with wah wah, organ
- Cedric Lawson — electric piano
- Reggie Lucas — electric guitar
- Khalil Balakrishna — electric sitar
- Michael Henderson — bass guitar
- Al Foster — drums
- James Mtume Foreman — percussion
- Badal Roy — tabla
- Sonny Fortune — flute
- Carlos Garnett — soprano saxophone
- John McLaughlin — electric guitar

1973

- Miles Davis — electric trumpet with wah wah, electric piano, organ
- Dave Liebman — flute
- John Stubblefield — soprano saxophone
- Pete Cosey — electric guitar
- Reggie Lucas — electric guitar
- Michael Henderson — bass guitar
- Al Foster — drums
- James Mtume Foreman — percussion

1974

- Miles Davis — electric trumpet with wah wah, organ
- Dave Liebman — soprano saxophone, flute
- Sonny Fortune — flute
- Pete Cosey — electric guitar
- Reggie Lucas — electric guitar
- Dominique Gaumont — electric guitar
- Michael Henderson — bass guitar
- Al Foster — drums
- James Mtume Foreman — percussion

=== By song ===
"Ife" & "Jabali" (12 June 1972 - Columbia Studio E)

- Miles Davis - electric trumpet with wah wah
- Sonny Fortune - soprano saxophone, flute
- Bennie Maupin - clarinet, flute
- Carlos Garnett - soprano saxophone
- Lonnie Liston Smith - piano
- Harold I. Williams Jr. - piano
- Michael Henderson - Fender bass
- Al Foster - drums
- Billy Hart - drums
- Badal Roy - tabla
- James Mtume - African percussion

"Rated X" (6 September 1972 - Columbia Studio E)

- Miles Davis - organ
- Reggie Lucas - electric guitar
- Khalil Balakrishna - electric sitar
- Michael Henderson - bass guitar
- Al Foster - drums
- James Mtume Foreman - percussion
- Badal Roy - tabla

"Billy Preston" (8 December 1972 - Columbia Studio E)

- Miles Davis - electric trumpet with wah wah
- Carlos Garnett - soprano saxophone
- Cedric Lawson – Fender Rhodes electric piano
- Reggie Lucas - electric guitar
- Khalil Balakrishna - electric sitar
- Michael Henderson - bass guitar
- Al Foster - drums
- James Mtume Foreman - percussion
- Badal Roy - tabla

"Calypso Frelimo" (17 September 1973 - Columbia Studio E)

- Miles Davis — electric trumpet with wah wah, electric piano, organ
- Dave Liebman — flute
- John Stubblefield — soprano saxophone
- Pete Cosey — electric guitar
- Reggie Lucas — electric guitar
- Michael Henderson — bass guitar
- Al Foster — drums
- James Mtume Foreman — percussion

"He Loved Him Madly" (19 or 20 June 1974 - Columbia Studio E)

- Miles Davis — electric trumpet with wah wah, organ
- Dave Liebman — soprano saxophone, flute
- Pete Cosey — electric guitar
- Reggie Lucas — electric guitar
- Dominique Gaumont — electric guitar
- Michael Henderson — bass guitar
- Al Foster — drums
- James Mtume Foreman — percussion

"Mtume" (7 October 1974 - Columbia Studio E)

- Miles Davis — electric trumpet with wah wah, organ
- Sonny Fortune — flute
- Pete Cosey — electric guitar
- Reggie Lucas — electric guitar
- Michael Henderson — bass guitar
- Al Foster — drums
- James Mtume Foreman — percussion

"Maiysha" (7 October 1974 - Columbia Studio E)

- Miles Davis — electric trumpet with wah wah, organ
- Sonny Fortune — flute
- Pete Cosey — electric guitar
- Reggie Lucas — electric guitar
- Dominique Gaumont — electric guitar
- Michael Henderson — bass guitar
- Al Foster — drums
- James Mtume Foreman — percussion

=== By recording session ===
March 9, 1972 Miles Davis (tpt); Wally Chambers (hca); Cornel Dupree (g); Michael Henderson (el-b); Al Foster (d); Bernard Purdie (d); James Mtume Forman (cga, perc); Wade Marcus (brass arr); Billy Jackson (rhythm arr)

June 1, 1972 Miles Davis (tpt); Dave Liebman (ss); Chick Corea (synth); Herbie Hancock (org); Harold I. Williams (el-p); John McLaughlin (g); Collin Walcott (sitar); Paul Buckmaster (cello); Michael Henderson (el-b); Jack DeJohnette (d); Jabali Billy Hart (d, perc, bgo); Charles Don Alias (cga, perc); James Mtume Forman (cga, perc); Badal Roy (tabla)

June 6, 1972 Miles Davis (tpt); Carlos Garnett (as, ts); Bennie Maupin (bcl); Herbie Hancock (el-p, synth); Harold I. Williams (el-p, synth); Lonnie Liston Smith (org); David Creamer (g); Collin Walcott (sitar); Paul Buckmaster (cello); Michael Henderson (el-b); Jack DeJohnette (d, handclaps); Jabali Billy Hart (d, handclaps); Charles Don Alias (perc, handclaps); James Mtume Forman (perc, handclaps); Badal Roy (tabla, handclaps)

June 12, 1972 Miles Davis (tpt); Carlos Garnett (ss); Bennie Maupin (bcl); Lonnie Liston Smith (org); Harold I. Williams (el-p, synth); Michael Henderson (el-b); Al Foster (d); Jabali Billy Hart (d, perc); James Mtume Forman (cga, perc); Badal Roy (tabla)

August 23, 1972 Miles Davis (tpt); Cedric Lawson (org); Reggie Lucas (g); Khalil Balakrishna (sitar); Michael Henderson (el-b); Al Foster (d); Badal Roy (tabla); James Mtume Forman (cga)

September 6, 1972 Miles Davis (org); Reggie Lucas (g); Khalil Balakrishna (sitar); Cedric Lawson (synth); Michael Henderson (el-b); Al Foster (d); James Mtume Forman (cga, perc); Badal Roy (tabla)

November 29, 1972 Miles Davis (tpt); Carlos Garnett (ss); Cedric Lawson (keyb); Reggie Lucas (g); Khalil Balakrishna (sitar); Michael Henderson (el-b); Al Foster (d); James Mtume Forman (cga, perc); Badal Roy (tabla)

December 8, 1972 Miles Davis (org); Carlos Garnett (ss); Cedric Lawson (keyb); Reggie Lucas (g); Khalil Balakrishna (sitar); Michael Henderson (el-b); Al Foster (d); James Mtume Forman (cga, perc); Badal Roy (tabla)

January 4, 1973 Miles Davis (tpt); Dave Liebman (ss); Cedric Lawson (keyb); Reggie Lucas (g); Khalil Balakrishna (sitar); Michael Henderson (el-b); Al Foster (d); James Mtume Forman (cga, perc); Badal Roy (tabla)

July 26, 1973 Miles Davis (tpt, org); Dave Liebman (ss, fl); Pete Cosey (g); Reggie Lucas (g); Michael Henderson (el-b); Al Foster (d); James Mtume Forman (cga, perc)

September 17, 1973 Miles Davis (tpt, org); Dave Liebman (ts, fl); John Stubblefield (ss); Pete Cosey (g); Reggie Lucas (g); Michael Henderson (el-b); Al Foster (d); James Mtume Forman (cga, perc)

September 18, 1973 Miles Davis (tpt, org); Dave Liebman (ts); Pete Cosey (g); Reggie Lucas (g); Michael Henderson (el-b); Al Foster (d); James Mtume Forman (cga)

June 19, 1974 Miles Davis (tpt, org); Dave Liebman (fl); Pete Cosey (g); Reggie Lucas (g); Dominique Gaumont (g); Michael Henderson (el-b); Al Foster (d); James Mtume Forman (cga, perc)

October 7, 1974 Miles Davis (tpt, org); Sonny Fortune (ss, fl); Pete Cosey (g); Reggie Lucas (g); Dominique Gaumont (g); Michael Henderson (el-b); Al Foster (d); James Mtume Forman (cga, perc)

November 6, 1974 Miles Davis (tpt, org); Sonny Fortune (ss, ts, fl); Pete Cosey (g, d, perc); Reggie Lucas (g); Dominique Gaumont (g); Michael Henderson (el-b); Al Foster (d); James Mtume Forman (cga, perc)

May 5, 1975 Miles Davis (tpt, org); Sam Morrison (ts); Pete Cosey (g, perc); Reggie Lucas (g); Michael Henderson (el-b); Al Foster (d); James Mtume Forman (cga, perc)

== Turnaround ==
Turnaround

Compilation album by Miles Davis
- Released: April 22, 2023
- Recorded: June 12, 1972–July 26, 1973
- Studios: Columbia Studio B New York
- Genre: Jazz fusion
- Length: 39:16
- Labels: Columbia; Legacy

Miles Davis chronology
Merci Miles! Live at Vienne (2021)	Turnaround (2023)

Turnaround (subtitled Rare Miles from the Complete 'On the Corner' Sessions) is an album released for Record Store Day on April 22, 2023. It compiles tracks from The Complete On the Corner Sessions recorded from June 1972 through July 1973.

=== Track listing ===
All tracks are written by Miles Davis.

Side one
No.	Title	Recording date	Length
1.	"Jabali"	June 12, 1972	11:06
2.	"U-turnaround"	November 29, 1972	8:27
Total length:			19:33

Side two
No.	Title	Recording date	Length
1.	"The Hen"	January 4, 1973	12:36
2.	"Big Fun/Holly-wuud"	July 26, 1973	7:07
Total length:			19:43
