= Love Songs (Miles Davis album) =

Compilation album by Miles Davis
- Released: February 2, 1999
- Recorded: May 10, 1957 – February 12, 1964
- Genre: Jazz
- Length: 1:00:16
- Label: Sony
- Producers: George Avakian, Bob Belden, Cal Lampley, Teo Macero, Seth Rothstein

Miles Davis chronology
Panthalassa: The Music of Miles Davis 1969–1974 (1998)	Love Songs (1999)	Out of the Blue (1999)

Love Songs is a compilation album by American jazz musician Miles Davis, released on February 2, 1999, by Sony Music Records. The songs it compiles were recorded between May 10, 1957, and February 12, 1964.

== Critical reception ==
Robert Christgau, writing in The Village Voice, gave Love Songs an "A" and said that "Miles's quiet cool and taciturn affection for the limits of the melody at hand" summons a "consensual intimacy" that "definitely won't kill the mood." Matt Robinson of All About Jazz felt that it explores Davis' "trademark poise and lyricism" that was best expressed in ballads and credited the compilation for "revealing a diversity even in the broad unity of the love song." Q magazine gave it four out of five stars and stated, "The master of the art, Davis could push an entire universe of fragility into a simple love song and play the trumpet with such disarming candour it hurt".

In a mixed review for Allmusic, Scott Yanow gave the album two-and-a-half stars and said that, because of "the slow tempos and the lack of variety in moods, this set is really designed more for background music than for close listening." In The Rolling Stone Album Guide (2004), J. D. Considine gave Love Songs three-and-a-half out of five stars and found it "quite sweet" for a "theme-oriented collection".

== Track listing ==
No.	Title	Writer(s)	Length
1.	"I Fall in Love Too Easily"	Sammy Cahn; Jule Styne	6:48
2.	"I Thought About You"	Johnny Mercer; James Van Heusen	4:56
3.	"Summer Night"	Al Dubin; Harry Warren	6:01
4.	"My Ship"	Kurt Weill; Ira Gershwin	4:34
5.	"Someday My Prince Will Come"	Frank Churchill; Larry Morey	9:09
6.	"Stella by Starlight"	Ned Washington; Victor Young	4:53
7.	"My Funny Valentine"	Richard Rodgers; Lorenz Hart	14:58
8.	"I Loves You, Porgy"	George Gershwin; Ira Gershwin; DuBose Heyward	3:40
9.	"Old Folks"	Willard Robison; Dedette Lee Hill	5:17
Total length:			1:00:16

== Personnel ==
- Cannonball Adderley – alto saxophone
- George Avakian – producing
- Danny Bank – bass clarinet
- Bob Belden – producing
- Joe Bennett – trombone
- Frank Butler – drums
- Johnny Carisi – trumpet
- Ron Carter – bass
- Paul Chambers – bass
- Jimmy Cleveland – trombone
- Jimmy Cobb – drums
- George Coleman – tenor saxophone
- John Coltrane – tenor saxophone
- Sid Cooper – clarinet, flute
- Miles Davis – trumpet
- Gil Evans – arranging, conducting
- Victor Feldman – piano
- Howard Fritzson – art direction
- Bernie Glow – trumpet
- Herbie Hancock – piano
- Dick Hixon – trombone
- Don Hunstein – photography
- Taft Jordan – trumpet
- Wynton Kelly – piano
- Lee Konitz – alto saxophone
- Cal Lampley – producing
- Teo Macero – producing
- Randall Martin – cover design
- Tony Miranda – French horn
- Hank Mobley – tenor saxophone
- Louis Mucci – trumpet
- Romeo Penque – clarinet, bass clarinet, flute, alto flute
- Frank Rehak – trombone
- Jerome Richardson – clarinet, flute, alto flute
- Seth Rothstein – producing
- Ernie Royal – trumpet
- Willie Ruff – French horn
- Gunther Schuller – French horn
- Bill Steele – photography
- Art Taylor – drums
- Julius Watkins – French horn

== Charts ==
Chart	Peak chart position
U.S. Top Jazz Albums (Billboard)	1

== Bibliography ==
- Considine, J. D.; et al. (November 2, 2004). Brackett, Nathan; Hoard, Christian (eds.). The New Rolling Stone Album Guide: Completely Revised and Updated 4th Edition. Simon & Schuster. ISBN 0-7432-0169-8.
