= Philippe Gaillot =

Philippe Gaillot may refer to:

- Philippe Gaillot (footballer)
- Philippe Gaillot (musician)
