= Corky McCoy =

American illustrator from Los Angeles

Cortez "Corky" McCoy is an American illustrator from Los Angeles. He is known for his cartoon designs of urban African-Americans on Miles Davis album covers.

== Work for Miles Davis ==
Information on McCoy's life before meeting Miles Davis is scarce. He was working as an artist when he met Davis. The two became close friends, and Davis and McCoy shared an apartment in New York City on West 77th Street.

McCoy created the cover art for Davis' albums On the Corner (1972), In Concert: Live at Philharmonic Hall (1973), Big Fun (1974), and Water Babies (1976). The artwork for the cover of On the Corner was produced at Davis' instigation. He was concerned that his music was not reaching an African-American audience, and wanted McCoy to create something that they would relate to. The reaction from Columbia Records when they saw the result was not positive. Davis insisted on using McCoy's cover art. Davis recalled in his typical blunt interview style:

...when I showed 'em the new cover by Corky McCoy, they told me it won't help sell any albums. And I told 'em how to merchandize nigger music, man. Put Chinese on the covers. Put niggers on the covers, put brothers and sisters on 'em, whatever they're going to call us next, that's what you put on the covers to sell to us.

According to Davis, McCoy was reluctant at first, but Davis was enthusiastic about the art that McCoy produced:

Corky McCoy's my best friend. I just called him up and told him what to do. In fact, he was afraid to do it, and I... you know, look at those covers, man. He just lives it. Black life! It's different from white life, Chinese life, whatever. My life's different from yours.

McCoy's cover art for On the Corner depicts a group of cartoon characters, a scene of "ghettodelic" street life among the younger generation of African Americans. The post-1960s, funk-style fashions are similar to the spirit of the blaxploitation film images of the same era.

In Concert: Live at Philharmonic Hall included illustrations inside the album by McCoy satirizing mainstream rock and roll music, with a cartoon music label "Slickophonics" and a long-haired white band with the name "Foot Fooler" on the front of the drum kit. In a 1974 review of the album, music magazine Coda characterized McCoy's illustrations for this album, and On the Corner, as "tastelessness".

Davis tried commissioning two different European cartoonists to create cover art for his album Rubberband during the 1980s. He was dissatisfied with the results, and the album was ultimately shelved. It would not be officially released until 2019.

In 2007, Columbia released the 6-CD box set The Complete On the Corner Sessions that included new illustrations by Corky McCoy.

== Other illustration works ==
McCoy created the cover art for the album Fresh Mode, released by hip-hop group Ugly Duckling, in 1999, as well as both singles released in promotion of the LP.

McCoy created illustrations for comedian Tim Meadows's 2000 book The Ladies Man: Sexin' and Lovin' Leon Phelps Style, co-written with Andrew Steele and Dennis McNicholas. The book was released in connection with the Tim Meadows comedy film The Ladies Man that featured a character with the same 1970s street-funk aesthetic associated with McCoy's album covers for Davis.
