= Big Fun (Miles Davis album) =

Compilation album by Miles Davis
- Released: April 19, 1974
- Recorded: November 19, 28, 1969; February 6, 1970; March 3, 1970; and June 12, 1972
- Studio: Columbia 52nd Street (New York City)
- Genre: Jazz-fusion
- Length: 98:45
- Label: Columbia
- Producer: Teo Macero

Miles Davis chronology
1958 Miles (1974)	Big Fun (1974)	Get Up with It (1974)

Big Fun is an album by American jazz trumpeter Miles Davis. It was released by Columbia Records on April 19, 1974, and compiled recordings Davis had made in sessions between 1969 and 1972. It was advertised as a new album with "four new Miles Davis compositions" One of three Davis albums released in 1974 and largely ignored, it was reissued on August 1, 2000, by Columbia and Legacy Records with additional material, which led to a critical reevaluation.

== Background and recording ==
Big Fun presents music from three phases of Miles Davis's early-seventies "electric" period. The album is named for a composition Davis recorded in 1973, but it was not released until 2007 on the box set The Complete On the Corner Sessions.

Sides one and four ("Great Expectations/Orange Lady" and "Lonely Fire") were recorded three months after the Bitches Brew sessions and incorporate sitar, tampura, tabla, and other Indian instruments. They also mark the first time since the beginning of Miles Davis's electric period that he played his trumpet with the Harmon mute which had been one of his hallmarks, making it sound much like the sitar. This contributed to creating a very clear and lean sound, highlighting both the high and low registers, as opposed to the busier sound of Bitches Brew which placed more emphasis on the middle and low registers.

"Ife"—named after James Mtume's daughter—was recorded after the 1972 On the Corner sessions, and the framework is similar to tracks from that record. It has a drum and electric bass groove (which in fact at one point breaks down due to mistiming) and a plethora of musicians improvising individually and in combinations over variations on the bassline.

== "Go Ahead John" ==
=== Recording ===
"Go Ahead John"
The recording has a strong groove and was titled by Davis as an exhortation to his guitar player John McLaughlin.

Recorded on March 3, 1970, "Go Ahead John" is an outtake from Davis's Jack Johnson sessions. The recording is a riff and groove-based, with a relatively sparser line-up of Steve Grossman on soprano saxophone, Dave Holland on bass, Jack DeJohnette on drums, and John McLaughlin on guitar with wah-wah pedal. It was one of the rare occasions in which Davis recorded without a musical keyboard. It was recorded in five sections, ranging from three to 13 minutes, which producer Teo Macero subsequently assembled in post-production four years later for Big Fun. DeJohnette provides a funky, complex groove, Holland plays bass with one constant note repeated, and McLaughlin plays in a staccato style with blues and funk elements. According to one music writer, the track's bass parts has "a trancelike drone that maintains" the predominantly Eastern vibe of the album.

DeJohnette's drums were manipulated by Macero, who used an automatic switcher to have them rattle back and forth between the left and right speakers on the recording. In his book Running the Voodoo Down: The Electric Music of Miles Davis, Davis-biographer Phil Freeman describes this technique as "100 percent Macero" and writes of its significance to the track as a whole, stating:

This doesn't create the effect of two drummers. It's just disorienting, throwing the ear off balance in a way that forces the listener to pay close attention. The drums cease to perform their traditional function. Jack DeJohnette's beats, funky and propulsive on the session tapes, are so chopped up that their timekeeping utility is virtually nil. Macero has diced the rhythm so adroitly that we are not even permitted to hear an entire drum hit or hi-hat crash. All that remains are clicks and whooshes, barely identifiable as drums and, again, practically useless as rhythmic indicators. Thus, the pace is maintained by Dave Holland's one-note throb and the occasional descending blues progression he plays. The feeling one gets from "Go Ahead John" becomes one of floating in space.

Davis's trumpet and McLaughlin's guitar parts were heavily overdubbed for the recording. The overdubbing effect was created by superimposing part of Davis's trumpet solo onto other parts of it, through something Teo Macero calls a "recording loop". Macero later said of this production technique, "You hear the two parts and it's only two parts, but the two parts become four and they become eight parts. This was done over in the editing room and it just adds something to the music [...] I called [Davis] in and I said, 'Come in, I think we've got something you'll like. We'll try it on and if you like it you've got it.' He came in and flipped out. He said it was one of the greatest things he ever heard".

=== Composition ===
Titled as an exhortation by Davis to McLaughlin, "Go Ahead John" features a basic blues motif, centered around E and B♭, as well as modulations introduced by Davis into the D♭ scale. The recording begins with McLaughlin's funky wah-wah lines, backing Grossman's sharp, restrained playing, with Davis's first trumpet solo entering at four minutes with scattered ideas. In his book Milestones: The Music and Times of Miles Davis, Jack Chambers writes that the recording's first 11 minutes and its closing four-and-a-half minutes "resemble Willie Nelson [from Jack Johnson] as a head arrangement built on a riff, with the riff sustained this time by McLaughlin's steady wah-wah in the background. Approximately six minutes into it, McLaughlin's guitar solo succeeds Davis's first solo, as the band vamps. Music journalist Todd S. Jenkins writes of this passage in the recording, "Thanks to the then-new wonders of noise gate technology, Jack DeJohnette’s drums and cymbals flit back and forth rapidly from left to right in the mix. With each switch, the guitar’s volume blasts in and out, over and over again, during McLaughlin’s relentlessly acidic solo". Following the passage, an unrelated theme opens with two minutes of a slow blues segment by Davis that is spliced into the recording, accompanied solely by occasional notes from Holland; According to Jack Chambers, Davis's blues solo "becomes a duet with himself by overdubbing, and then builds into a quintet performance lasting ten more minutes". Phil Freeman wrote of this "doubling effect", stating "Miles's two solos fit together perfectly, creating a feel similar to that of New Orleans jazz, with two trumpets weaving intricate, complementary lines around each other".

In Milestones: The Music and Times of Miles Davis, Chambers writes of Davis's segment and the complex production of "Go Ahead John", "In spite of the gimmickry, the blues segment manages to state some old verities in a new context, and state them powerfully. Most jazz listeners can hope that someday Go Ahead John will be unscrambled and re-presented to them as, among other things, an unhurried blues by Davis accompanied only by Holland". DownBeat critic John Ephland interprets the recording to be "Miles' most obvious allusion to the Godfather of Soul, James Brown", adding that "Conjuring up images of Brown's 'I Can't Stand Myself' and 'I Got the Feelin',' from '67 and '68, respectively, 'Go Ahead John' shuffles, swirls, gets down and runs rampant, with some very creative editing, courtesy of producer Teo Macero". AllMusic editor Thom Jurek writes of the recording, "There is no piano. What's most interesting about this date is how it prefigures what would become 'Right Off' from Jack Johnson. It doesn't have the same fire, nor does it manage to sustain itself for the duration, but there are some truly wonderful sections in the piece". In Running the Voodoo Down: The Electric Music of Miles Davis, Phil Freeman calls the recording "one of the best things Miles and Macero created during the 1970s", writing that "It's a singular achievement in production, one that presents Miles in a different light than anything else in his catalog".

== Release and reception ==
Released on April 19, 1974, by Columbia Records, Big Fun debuted at number 193 on the U.S. Billboard Top LPs chart and sold 50,000 copies in its first week. It ultimately reached number 179 on the chart and number six on Billboard's Top Jazz LPs chart. According to Todd S. Jenkins of All About Jazz, "The long, ever-droning, darkly exotic electric music, and in fact the very idea of just four songs taking up four full sides of an album, was not too appealing to critics or the general market at a time when short, sharp disco tunes were beginning to chart like wildfire. So Big Fun received generally weak reviews".

In a positive review, Billboard stated "Much of the existentialism in musical forms that has characterized Miles Davis' recent offerings are embodied in this new album, but Davis has the creativity of mind and expertise of profession to break away from the conventional and still remain an exciting, interesting, innovative and acceptable artist. This album is in that genre". Bob Palmer of Rolling Stone commented that "essentially Big Fun is the most consistently appealing, varied and adventurous Miles Davis album since Live/Evil, commands attention as such, and will doubtless give Davis's many imitators something to think about".

== Legacy and reappraisal ==
Retrospective professional reviews
Review scores
Source	Rating
AllMusic	3/5 stars
Alternative Press	4/5
Christgau's Record Guide	A−
DownBeat	4/5 stars
MusicHound Jazz	3/5 stars
The Penguin Guide to Jazz Recordings	3.5/4 stars
The Rolling Stone Album Guide	3/5 stars
The Rolling Stone Jazz Record Guide	5/5 stars
Tom Hull – on the Web	B+

In Christgau's Record Guide: Rock Albums of the Seventies (1981), Robert Christgau believed three of the album's "side-long" compositions "wind down prematurely", but "for the most part this is uncommonly beautiful stuff, and it gets better". He singled out "Lonely Fire" as a highlight, writing that "after meandering at the beginning [it] develops into lyrical mood music reminiscent in spirit and fundamental intent of Sketches of Spain". The Rolling Stone Album Guide (2004) said the album "defies easy categorization, although its dark, moody tracks boast a strong undercurrent of Indian classical rhythms in addition to the expected swathes of rock and funk".

Alternative Press called the album "essential....colorful and exotic" and wrote that it represents "the high water mark of his experiments in the fusion of rock, funk, electronica and jazz". The Penguin Guide to Jazz described it as "an entertaining simulation of a top-drawer R&B band, just about pushed into the jazz zone", with the key elements of Davis's "electronic" sound. Stylus Magazine's Edwin C. Faust commented that "a world without this music would be a considerably emptier place" and cited it as Davis's "greatest achievement" with regard to an album's "overall effect". Faust felt that critics who originally found it "scattered" and "unfocused" might not have if they had had "the knowledge of recording dates and band line-ups", while elaborating on its significance to Davis's catalogue:

"Big Fun has a very consistent vibe throughout. In contrast to its title, the album is moody and hauntingly lyrical—not entirely unlike In a Silent Way. Imagine the foreboding nature of Bitches Brew, with the primitive and funky undercurrent of On the Corner, but also with the majestic melodies of In a Silent Way cresting the surface. Plus, Big Fun is tied together by a stronger Eastern vibe than any of Davis’s other albums ... Big Fun is the work of a true musical craftsman and an even truer artist."

DownBeat critic John Ephland commented that "there is indeed a sense of adventure, of taking chances with so much talent, and with such skeletal designs", adding that "Big Fun reinforces the notion that Miles' primary contributions to music have come via orchestrating, organizing, enabling. How this music was put together proves to be as interesting as any solo or ensemble work [...] Incidentally, the digital sound quality is consistently high throughout". AllMusic editor Thomas Jurek found "some outstanding playing and composing here", but criticized "the numerous lineups and uneven flow of the tracks", writing that "despite the presence of classic tracks like Joe Zawinul's 'Great Expectations', Big Fun feels like the compendium of sources it is".

== Track listing ==
All compositions by Miles Davis, except "Mulher Laranja" and "Recollections", composed by Joe Zawinul.

Original release

Side one
No.	Title	Length
1.	"Great Expectations" "Mulher Laranja"	27:23

Side two
No.	Title	Length
1.	"Ife"	21:34

Side three
No.	Title	Length
1.	"Go Ahead John"	28:27

Side four
No.	Title	Length
1.	"Lonely Fire"	21:21

Double CD edition

Disc one
No.	Title	Length
1.	"Great Expectations" "Mulher Laranja"	27:23
2.	"Ife"	21:34
3.	"Recollections"	18:55
4.	"Trevere"	5:55

Disc two
No.	Title	Length
1.	"Go Ahead John"	28:29
2.	"Lonely Fire"	21:21
3.	"The Little Blue Frog"	9:10
4.	"Yaphet"	9:39

Note: "Mulher Laranja" was not listed in the liner notes and tracklist until the album was reissued on CD. However, the piece does appear on all editions of the album.

== Personnel ==
=== Musicians ===
"Great Expectations/Orange Lady" (19 November 1969 – Columbia Studio E)

- Miles Davis – trumpet
- Steve Grossman – soprano saxophone
- Bennie Maupin – bass clarinet
- John McLaughlin – electric guitar
- Khalil Balakrishna – electric sitar
- Bihari Sharma – tabla, tanpura
- Herbie Hancock – electric piano
- Chick Corea – electric piano
- Ron Carter – double bass
- Harvey Brooks – Fender bass guitar
- Billy Cobham – drums
- Airto Moreira – percussion

"Ife" (12 June 1972 – Columbia Studio E)

- Miles Davis – electric trumpet with wah wah
- Sonny Fortune – soprano saxophone, flute
- Bennie Maupin – bass clarinet, flute
- Carlos Garnett – soprano saxophone
- Lonnie Liston Smith – electric piano
- Harold Ivory Williams Jr. – electric piano
- Michael Henderson – electric bass
- Al Foster – drums
- Billy Hart – drums
- Badal Roy – tabla
- James Mtume – African percussion

+ "Recollections" (6 February 1970 – Columbia Studio B)

- Miles Davis – trumpet
- Wayne Shorter – soprano saxophone
- Bennie Maupin – bass clarinet
- John McLaughlin – electric guitar
- Joe Zawinul – electric piano (left)
- Chick Corea – electric piano (right)
- Dave Holland – electric bass guitar
- Billy Cobham – triangle
- Jack DeJohnette – drums
- Airto Moreira – cuíca, percussion

+ "Trevere" (28 November 1969 – Columbia Studio E)

- Miles Davis – trumpet
- Steve Grossman – soprano saxophone
- Bennie Maupin – bass clarinet
- Chick Corea – electric piano
- Larry Young – organ, celeste
- Khalil Balakrishna – electric sitar
- Bihari Sharma – tamboura
- Harvey Brooks – electric bass guitar
- Dave Holland – double bass
- Jack DeJohnette – drums
- Billy Cobham – drums
- Airto Moreira – cuíca, berimbau

"Go Ahead John" (3 March 1970 – Columbia Studio E)

- Miles Davis – trumpet
- Steve Grossman – soprano saxophone
- John McLaughlin – electric guitar
- Dave Holland – bass guitar
- Jack DeJohnette – drums

"Lonely Fire" (27 January 1970 – Columbia Studio B)

- Miles Davis – trumpet
- Wayne Shorter – soprano saxophone
- Bennie Maupin – bass clarinet
- Khalil Balakrishna – sitar, Indian instruments
- Chick Corea – electric piano
- Joe Zawinul – electric piano, Farfisa organ
- Dave Holland – double bass
- Harvey Brooks – Fender bass guitar
- Jack DeJohnette – drums
- Billy Cobham – drums
- Airto Moreira – Indian instruments, percussion

+ "The Little Blue Frog" (28 November 1969 – Columbia Studio E)

- Miles Davis – trumpet
- Steve Grossman – soprano saxophone
- Bennie Maupin – bass clarinet
- John McLaughlin – electric guitar
- Chick Corea – electric piano
- Larry Young – organ, celeste
- Khalil Balakrishna – electric sitar
- Bihari Sharma – tamboura
- Harvey Brooks – electric bass guitar
- Dave Holland – double bass
- Jack DeJohnette – drums
- Billy Cobham – drums
- Airto Moreira – cuíca, berimbau

+ "Yaphet" (19 November 1969 – Columbia Studio E)

- Miles Davis – trumpet
- Steve Grossman – soprano saxophone
- Bennie Maupin – bass clarinet
- John McLaughlin – electric guitar
- Herbie Hancock – electric piano (left)
- Chick Corea – electric piano (right)
- Khalil Balakrishna – electric sitar
- Bihari Sharma – tampura, tabla
- Harvey Brooks – electric bass guitar
- Ron Carter – double bass
- Billy Cobham – drums, triangle
- Airto Moreira – cuíca, berimbau

=== Additional personnel ===
2-LP original

- Teo Macero – original record producer
- Seth Rothstein – project director
- Frank Laico, Stan Tonkel – original audio engineer
- Russ Payne, Stan Weiss, John Guerriere – original mix engineer
- Steve Berkowitz – A&R for Legacy
- Patti Matheny, Darren Salmieri – A&R coordination
- Corky McCoy – original cover art

2-CD reissue

- Bob Belden – reissue producer
- Seth Foster – reissue digital remastering at Sony Music Studios, NYC
- Bennie Maupin – reissue main liner notes
- Swing Journal Co., Ltd. Japan – reissue backcover photography
- Uve Kuusik – reissue liner notes photography
- Howard Fritzson – reissue art direction
- Randall Martin – reissue design
- Rachel Dicono – packaging manager
- John Jackson – production assistance

== Bibliography ==
- Alkyer, Frank; John Ephland (2007). The Miles Davis Reader. Hal Leonard Corporation. ISBN 978-1-4234-3076-6.
- Chambers, Jack (1998). Milestones: The Music and Times of Miles Davis. Da Capo Press. ISBN 0-306-80849-8.
- Freeman, Phil (2005). Running the Voodoo Down: The Electric Music of Miles Davis. Hal Leonard Corporation. ISBN 0-87930-828-1.
