= Orlando DiGirolamo =

American musician

- Also known as: Lanny DiJay
- Born: April 20, 1924
- Died: January 26, 1998 (aged 73) New Jersey, United States
- Genres: Jazz
- Occupations: Accordionist, pianist, composer, teacher
- Instruments: Accordion, piano

Orlando DiGirolamo (April 20, 1924 – January 26, 1998) was an American jazz accordionist, pianist, composer, and teacher. He is sometimes credited as "Lanny DiJay" on jazz recordings. DiGirolamo collaborated frequently with legendary jazz producer Teo Macero, and played on Macero's first commercial release, Explorations, also featuring Charles Mingus. He was described by Metronome magazine as an "extraordinary accordionist of the modern persuasion."

== Biography ==
=== Early life and education ===
DiGirolamo's parents emigrated to the United States from the Abruzzo region of Italy, and settled in New Kensington, Pennsylvania, where DiGirolamo was born in 1924. Musically inclined from a young age, he was first introduced to the accordion by his grandfather, and began studying accordion and piano. He was writing original compositions by age 10, and joined the local orchestra at 14. After finishing high school in 1942, he traveled to New York City to begin pursuing music, and performed on the Major Bowes Amateur Hour.

In early 1943, at age 18, he was drafted into the army, and spent two years fighting in World War II. He participated in the invasion at Normandy, fought at the Battle of the Bulge, earned five Battle Stars, and was awarded the Bronze Star for helping to save a companion platoon from enemy capture. He was also a member of the Army jazz band, The Four Sharps.

When DiGirolamo returned from Europe, he moved to New York City to attend New York University (NYU). There, DiGirolamo joined the exclusive Alpha Phi Delta fraternity, whose membership also includes Frank Sinatra. In 1951, DiGirolamo transferred to the Juilliard School, and later to Columbia University, where he went on to receive a Master's degree, and a Doctorate in Musical Improvisation.

=== Music career ===
DiGirolamo's jazz career started in Europe after the end of the war. He remained in France until 1946, performing live, and recording for the recently liberated Radio Monte Carlo. In mid-1946, he returned to the United States, and spent the next three years touring during the Bebop jazz scene. It was also during this time that he was given the nickname, "Lanny DiJay," by which he was sometimes credited on his recordings.

Explorations (reissue) front cover

After several years of touring, DiGirolamo decided in 1949 to begin his formal education in New York. Although he started at NYU, it was his fortuitous transfer to Juilliard which would lead to his encounter with Teo Macero. After meeting at Juilliard, DiGirolamo and Macero became friends and collaborators, and began to work together on Macero's experimental jazz recordings. Their first commercial recording was the 1954 Debut Records LP, Explorations (DLP-6). The album featured six tracks, including "Yesterdays," arranged by DiGirolamo. Charles Mingus also played on the recording, and one reviewer noted that despite its conceptual nature, "Mingus and DiGirolamo rescue the music when it gets too heady."

The Explorations recording was part of Mingus's Jazz Composers Workshop. At the time, the Workshop recordings were considered "too complex" and "abstract," but are now credited with opening up "all kind of musical doors." In 1993, Explorations was archived by the Library of Congress as part of the Charles Mingus Collection. It was reissued on CD in 2006, with additional tracks.

During a career spanning several decades of recordings and performances, DiGirolamo worked with numerous respected jazz figures including Macero, Mingus, Ed Shaughnessy, Maynard Ferguson, Art Farmer, Cecil McBee, Wendell Marshall, Mal Waldron, Pepper Adams, Carla Bley, Larry Coryell, and Kip Hanrahan, among others. He performed throughout New York City, including gigs at historic venues The Hickory House, The Town Hall, Birdland, and The Blue Note.

Through his playing, and pioneering collaborations with Macero, DiGirolamo helped take the accordion, largely considered an "uncool" instrument, and build its foundation as a respected part of the avant-garde jazz ensemble.

DiGirolamo was "fervently determined to show that the accordion needn't be a merely imitative instrument," and developed a unique style of playing. While the accordion is traditionally played with one hand on melody, and one hand on rhythm chords, DiGirolamo used the rhythm hand melodically as well, creating a different sound, and elevating the instrument's potential. Bill Coss, editor of Metronome magazine, described this technique as using "both the left and right hand in a linear style."

DiGirolamo was immortalized by American writer and jazz critic Harvey Pekar, in an illustrated piece on Teo Macero published in the Village Voice in 1994. In describing Macero's early albums with DiGirolamo, Pekar wrote that DiGirolamo's accordion playing was "among the most striking features of those sessions," and that "the cat played some exciting shit."

=== Family and personal life ===
In 1961, DiGirolamo married Diana Matano. They lived in northern New Jersey, and had three children, Olana, Christopher, and Arland.

DiGirolamo taught music at Columbia University. He was the Band Director at Elmwood Park Memorial High School in the 1960s through 1977, and wrote the music for the school's alma mater. In 1977, he became Director of Music and Arts for the schools in Ossining, New York. As an educator, he worked to bring an appreciation of music and jazz to children. While teaching at Elmwood Park Memorial High School, he completed his Doctorate in Musical Improvisation, and specifically developed methods to help young music students with improvisational skills.

DiGirolamo died in an auto accident in New Jersey in 1998. After DiGirolamo's death, Macero composed and recorded the track "Shifting Sands" in his memory, and dedicated the 2003 album Whispering Gods to "my dear friend Lanny Di Jay, a.k.a. Lanny Di Girolamo, who is no longer with us (miss you)."

The Orlando DiGirolamo Scholarship Fund for Children was established in his honor, and every year recognizes young students studying and pursuing music.
