= Orchestra U.S.A. =

The Orchestra U.S.A. was an American jazz musical ensemble, active from 1962 to 1965.

The orchestra was founded in 1962 by John Lewis, along with Gunther Schuller and Harold Farberman, as an experiment in Third Stream blending of classical music and jazz. The ensemble itself was large, and included a full string section in addition to jazz solo performers. Lewis and Schuller both contributed compositions to the ensemble, as did Gary McFarland, Benny Golson, Jimmy Giuffre, Hall Overton, and Teo Macero. Among the jazz musicians to work in the ensemble were Gerry Mulligan, Ornette Coleman, Herb Pomeroy, Nick Travis, Leo Wright, Phil Woods, Jim Hall, Richard Davis, Connie Kay, Eric Dolphy, Coleman Hawkins, Benny Golson, Thad Jones, Joe Newman, Jimmy Raney, Jerome Richardson and Mike Zwerin. A sextet of players from the group also recorded on their own in 1964.

== Discography ==
- Orchestra U.S.A.: The Debut Recording (Colpix Records, 1963)
- Jazz Journey (Columbia Records, 1963)
- The Sextet of Orchestra U.S.A. (RCA Records, 1964)
- Sonorities (Columbia, 1965)
