= Daragh McCarthy =

Irish film director

Daragh McCarthy is a Dublin-born filmmaker and musician. He has directed numerous video clips including early videos for The Frames, a Dublin group led by Academy Award winning Glen Hansard.

In 1996 he produced and directed the hardcore punk documentary The Stars Are Underground featuring Dublin bands of the early 1990s such as The Frames, Mexican Pets and Female Hercules. He is also producer/director of Teo: A Life in Music, a documentary about jazz musician and producer Teo Macero. It was filmed over the last five years of Macero's life.

McCarthy went to St. David's CBS, Artane in Dublin.

== See also ==
- Teo Macero
- The Stars Are Underground
