= Bihari Sharma =

Tabla player

Bihari Sharma is a tabla player who recorded on two Miles Davis albums in 1969 and 1970. Guitarist John McLaughlin, already interested in Indian music, suggested him and sitar player Khalil Balakrishna to Davis during the Bitches Brew sessions.

== Discography ==
[dates are for album releases; later Davis compilations are not listed.]

- Big Fun (1974)
