= Get Up with It =

Compilation album by Miles Davis
- Released: November 22, 1974
- Recorded: May 19, 1970 – October 7, 1974
- Studios: Columbia 30th Street, New York City
- Genre: Jazz fusion
- Length: 122:05
- Label: Columbia
- Producer: Teo Macero

Miles Davis chronology
Big Fun (1974)	Get Up with It (1974)	Agharta (1975)

Get Up with It is a compilation album by American jazz musician Miles Davis. Released by Columbia Records on November 22, 1974, it collected previously unreleased material that Davis had recorded between 1970 and 1974, some of which dated from the sessions for his studio albums Jack Johnson (1971) and On the Corner (1972).

== Recordings ==
"He Loved Him Madly" was Davis' tribute to Duke Ellington, who used to tell his audiences, "I love you madly."

"Honky Tonk" was recorded in 1970 with musicians such as John McLaughlin and Herbie Hancock who had played on In a Silent Way and Bitches Brew. "Red China Blues" had been recorded in 1972, prior to On the Corner, while "Rated X" and "Billy Preston" were recorded later that year with the band heard on In Concert. The remaining tracks dated from 1973 and 1974 sessions with his then-current band, including guitarist Pete Cosey.

In the 2004 edition of the Rolling Stone Album Guide, J. D. Considine described the album's musical style as "worldbeat fusion".

== Critical reception ==
Professional ratings
Review scores
Source	Rating
AllMusic	4/5 stars
Alternative Press	5/5
Christgau's Record Guide	A−
DownBeat	5/5 stars
MusicHound Jazz	4/5 stars
The Penguin Guide to Jazz	3.5/4 stars
Pitchfork	9.6/10
The Rolling Stone Album Guide	4/5 stars
The Rolling Stone Jazz Record Guide	3/5 stars
The Village Voice	A−

Reviewing Get Up With It for Rolling Stone in 1975, Stephen Davis applauded Davis' adventurousness and the direction of his band, a "who's who of Seventies jazz-rock". Robert Christgau gave the album muted praise in The Village Voice, calling it "over two hours of what sometimes sounds like bullshit: it's not exactly music to fill the mind. Just the room." In the 1981 edition of Christgau's Record Guide: Rock Albums of the Seventies, he praised the side-long pieces "He Loved Him Madly" ("a tribute to Duke Ellington as elegant African internationalist") and "Calypso Frelimo" ("a Caribbean dance broken into sections that seem to follow with preordained emotional logic") while offering a mixed assessment of the other material.

For the album's 2000 reissue, Alternative Press published a review calling it "essential ... the overlooked classic of psychedelic soul and outlandish improv ... representing the high water mark of [Davis'] experiments in the fusion of rock, funk, electronica and jazz". Stylus Magazine's Chris Smith called it "more of an anything-goes hodgepodge than it is a sprawling masterwork."

In a highly positive retrospective review, Andy Beta of Pitchfork described Get Up with It as a "black funk dreamscape", observing that it "careens between extremes, as Miles presages everything still to come: ambient, no wave, world beat, jungle, new jack swing, post-rock, even hinting at the future sound of R&B and chart-topping pop". He particularly praised Davis' adoption of the electric organ: "Rather than run the voodoo down, now Miles could conjure it all by himself".

British composer Brian Eno cited "He Loved Him Madly" as an influence on his work in the liner notes to his 1982 album Ambient 4: On Land.

== Track listing ==
All compositions by Miles Davis.

Side one
No.	Title	Recording date	Length
1.	"He Loved Him Madly"	June 19, 1974	32:13

Side two
No.	Title	Recording date	Length
1.	"Maiysha"	October 7, 1974	14:52
2.	"Honky Tonk"	May 19, 1970	5:54
3.	"Rated X"	September 6, 1972	6:50

Side three
No.	Title	Recording date	Length
1.	"Calypso Frelimo"	September 17, 1973	32:07

Side four
No.	Title	Recording date	Length
1.	"Red China Blues"	March 9, 1972	4:10
2.	"Mtume"	October 7, 1974	15:08
3.	"Billy Preston"	December 8, 1972	12:35
Total length:			122:05

== Personnel ==
=== "He Loved Him Madly" ===
Recorded Columbia Studio E, New York City June 19 or 20, 1974

- Miles Davis — electric trumpet with wah-wah pedal, organ
- Dave Liebman — alto flute
- Reggie Lucas — electric guitar
- Dominique Gaumont — electric guitar
- Michael Henderson — bass guitar
- Al Foster — drums
- James Mtume — percussion

=== "Maiysha" ===
Recorded Columbia Studio E, New York City October 7, 1974

- Miles Davis — electric trumpet with wah-wah pedal, organ
- Sonny Fortune — flute
- Pete Cosey — electric guitar
- Reggie Lucas — electric guitar
- Dominique Gaumont — electric guitar
- Michael Henderson — bass guitar
- Al Foster — drums
- James Mtume — percussion

=== "Honky Tonk" ===
Recorded Columbia Studio E, New York City May 19, 1970

- Miles Davis — trumpet
- Steve Grossman — soprano saxophone
- John McLaughlin — electric guitar
- Keith Jarrett — electric piano
- Herbie Hancock — clavinet
- Michael Henderson — bass guitar
- Billy Cobham — drums
- Airto Moreira — percussion

=== "Rated X" ===
Recorded Columbia Studio E, New York City September 6, 1972

- Miles Davis — organ
- Cedric Lawson — electric piano
- Reggie Lucas — electric guitar
- Khalil Balakrishna — electric sitar
- Michael Henderson — bass guitar
- Al Foster — drums
- James Mtume — percussion
- Badal Roy — tabla

=== "Calypso Frelimo" ===
Recorded Columbia Studio E, New York City September 17, 1973

- Miles Davis — electric trumpet with wah-wah pedal, electric piano, organ
- Dave Liebman — flute
- John Stubblefield — soprano saxophone
- Pete Cosey — electric guitar
- Reggie Lucas — electric guitar
- Michael Henderson — bass guitar
- Al Foster — drums
- James Mtume — percussion

=== "Red China Blues" ===
Recorded Columbia Studio E, New York City March 9, 1972

- Miles Davis — electric trumpet with wah-wah pedal
- Lester Chambers — harmonica
- Cornell Dupree — electric guitar
- Michael Henderson — bass guitar
- Al Foster — drums
- Bernard Purdie — drums
- James Mtume — percussion
- Wade Marcus — brass arrangement
- Billy Jackson — rhythm arrangement

=== "Mtume" ===
Recorded Columbia Studio E, New York City October 7, 1974

- Miles Davis — electric trumpet with wah-wah pedal, organ
- Pete Cosey — electric guitar
- Reggie Lucas — electric guitar
- Dominique Gaumont — electric guitar
- Michael Henderson — bass guitar
- Al Foster — drums
- James Mtume — percussion
- Sonny Fortune — flute

=== "Billy Preston" ===
Recorded Columbia Studio E, New York City December 8, 1972

- Miles Davis — electric trumpet with wah-wah pedal
- Carlos Garnett — soprano saxophone
- Cedric Lawson — Fender Rhodes electric piano
- Reggie Lucas — electric guitar
- Khalil Balakrishna — electric sitar
- Michael Henderson — bass guitar
- Al Foster — drums
- James Mtume — percussion
- Badal Roy — tabla
