= Philippe Gaillot (musician) =

French jazz fusion guitarist

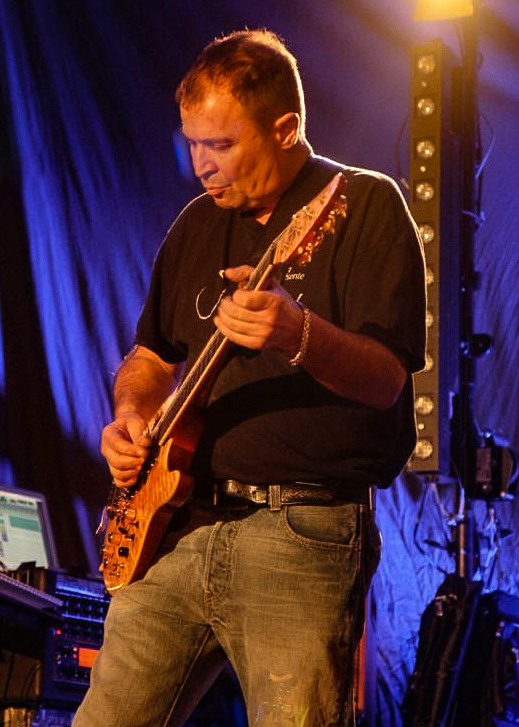
- Philippe Gaillot at Nîmes Festival 2010

Background information
- Born: May 26, 1956 (age 69); Paris, France
- Genres: Jazz fusion
- Occupation: Musician
- Instruments: Guitar, keyboards
- Labels: Metro, 52e Rue Est, RDC, Ilona, That Sound

Philippe Gaillot (born 26 May 1956) is a French jazz-fusion guitarist, pianist, singer, and composer. He is also a producer and sound engineer.

== Biography ==
=== Early life and education ===
At the age of seven, Philippe enrolled in the Versailles Conservatory in piano class. Four years later he started classical guitar. During his sixteenth year, he left for Montreal where he completed his musical apprenticeship where he practiced music theory and choral singing at the Vincent-d'Indy School and took guitar and organ lessons at Cours Galipeau Musique Inc.

Back in France he creates his own group; his influences are: Jimi Hendrix, Franck Zappa, Led Zeppelin, James Brown. He befriended guitarist Dominique Gaumont, his next door neighbor with whom he shared a large number of musical experiences, especially in New York when Dominique was guitarist in Miles Davis' group. During this stay he frequents musicians from the Black Artist Group such as Joe Bowie, Charles Bobo Shaw with whom he will perform. Joe Bowie recalls the collaboration with Philippe Gaillot in these terms "Joe & Charles Bobo Shaw also further developed the Human Arts Ensemble and collaborated with great French musicians Dominique Gaumont and Philippe Gaillot. Both were exceptional guitarists. ... Dominique Gaumont and Philippe Gaillot migrated from Paris to NY at that time and joining long time friends Bobo Shaw and Joe to support the world class Jam Sessions at the Children's Theater. Some incredible music was performed during this period. Unfortunately there was little audio/visual documentation done".

It was also during this stay that he learned about sound techniques by working with professionals in the sector in New York.

=== Career ===
In 1976, back in France, this passion for the recording world led him to create his studio La Calade in a village in the Gard. From then on, Gaillot pursued a dual career as a producer/sound engineer and composer-musician.

In 1981 Gaillot formed the band Concept, which published his first record. The same year, he created Big Fun, a jazz club near Anduze in the Cévennes. At the end of 1984, he returned to New York where he met Jaco Pastorius, Darryl Jones, and Mino Cinélu. He became the pupil of Mike Stern and John Scofield, who both played in bands with Miles Davis.

On his return to France in 1985, he led Concept with bassist Philippe Gareil and recorded an album that was released by 52e Rue Est. He performed in Nîmes International Jazz Festival, opening act for Ray Charles. In 1988 RDC released Lady Stroyed. He founded the Lady Stroyed Band, a group of ten musicians which performed in Europe until the end of the 1990s.

He set up a twenty-four track mobile recording studio in a truck and recorded musicians such as Carla Bley, Steve Swallow, Richie Cole, Michel Petrucciani Trio, Herbie Hancock, Chick Corea Elektric Band, Chris McGregor, live at the Château d'O Jazz Festival in Montpellier and Raoul Petite at Musikenstock in Nîmes.

In 1993, Gaillot was sound director of the Festival de St Louis du Sénégal. He then worked with Lucky Peterson and Randy Weston. He met the Koriste Soriba Kouyaté, who he managed for several years.

In 1994, he created Recall Studio, where he has recorded with Alain Bashung, Noir Désir, Césaria Evora, Stomy Bugsy, Corneille, Julien Doré, Gipsy Kings, Massilia Sound System, Pino Palladino, Jon Carin, Mike Stern, John McLaughlin, Shakti, Jacky Terrasson, and Biréli Lagrène. In 1995 RDC released Between You and Me, which he recorded with oudist Nabil Ibn Khalidi and saxophonists Bobby Rangell and Jorge Pardo.

In 2004, he will leave France to produce and record in Santiago de Cuba the album of singer Nora Mirsy LaVida.

In 2018, Ilona Records released Be Cool. Gaillot released it at the Nîmes Métropole Jazz Festival 2018. The idea for the album began at a concert in Marseille when Mike Stern suggested to Gaillot, one of his former students, to record some of its titles.

In 2021, Gaillot released the album Cassistanbul on his own label, That Sound Records. In these last two albums, he worked with Mike Stern, Jacky Terrasson, Stéphane Belmondo, Irving Acao, Linley Marthe, Dominique Di Piazza, Olivier Ker Ourio, and Pierre de Bethmann.

The article by journalist Guillaume Bregeras "The Planet of Sounds" which best sums up Philippe Gaillot's dual career as sound engineer and musician: "Among these characters who make music but who remain in the shadows, Philippe Gaillot is a be apart. Cannot stick a label ". Also this article by Stéphane Cerri, published in the French daily "Le Midi Libre" sums up well the musical approach of Philippe Gaillot - "a cool jazz and open to the world"

== Discography ==
=== As leader ===
- Lady Stroyed (RDC, 1988)
- Between You and Me (RDC, 1996)
- Be Cool (Ilona, 2018)
- CassIstanmbul (That Sound, 2022)

=== As sideman ===
- 1999 Kouyaté, Kanakassi (ACT)
- 2001 Soriba Kouyaté, Bamana (ACT)
- 2003 Soriba Kouyaté, Live In Montreux (ACT)
- 2004 Nora Mirsy, La Vida
- 2021 Jacky Terrasson, 53 (Blue Note) - one track "Palindrome"
- 2024 Thierry Maillard, Maman (Ilona)

With Concept

- Avis De Passage (Metro, 1981)
- Concept (523 Rue Est, 1986)

== Awards ==
- Nominated for VICTOIRES DE LA PROFESSION JAZZ 2018 as sound engineer of the year.
