= Dominique Gaumont =

French jazz guitarist (1953–1983)

Dominique Gaumont (8 January 1953 – 10 November 1983) was a French jazz guitarist who played alongside notable musicians such as Miles Davis, the Art Ensemble of Chicago, and Michel Portal.

== Biography ==
Dominique Gaumont was born on 8 January 1953 in Saint-Mandé, Paris, son of Édouard Gaumont, a former Guyanese politician.

After his musical studies, he became attracted to the electric guitar, in particular Jimi Hendrix, and began playing in public in 1970.

In 1974, he was invited by the trumpeter Miles Davis to join his band and tour the United States. Davis was quoted as saying, "Dominique gave me that African rhythmic thing". Gaumont appeared on Dark Magus, recorded in March 1974 at New York's Carnegie Hall, and recorded with Davis during subsequent 1974 studio sessions, released on the LP Get Up with It and the later archival release The Complete On the Corner Sessions. In New York, he lived with his friend and fellow musician Philippe Gaillot, with whom he shared many musical experiences.

He returned to Paris in 1975 where he formed his own band, Le Dominique Gaumont Energy, with Lucien Sombe (bass) and Joe Harmer (drums). They released an eponymous album.

He also worked with the Black Artists Group, the Art Ensemble of Chicago, the Human Arts Ensemble and Michel Portal.

He died of a drug overdose on 10 November 1983 at the age of 30.

== Discography ==
- Energy (Selmer)

=== With Miles Davis ===
- 1974: Get Up with It (Columbia)
- 1977: Dark Magus (Columbia) (recorded in 1974)
- 2007: The Complete On the Corner Sessions (Columbia) (includes 1974 recordings featuring Gaumont)
