= Khalil Balakrishna =

Indian sitar player

Khalil Balakrishna was an American percussionist, sitar and tanpura player who worked with Miles Davis between 1969 and 1974. His birth name was Carl Barrows. He regularly held a gig playing at a restaurant called 'Taste of India' on Bleecker Street in New York City.

Guitarist John McLaughlin, already interested in Indian music, suggested him and tabla player Bihari Sharma to Davis during the Bitches Brew sessions. He toured with Davis in 1972 and early 1973.

He died May 22, 2012 at the age of 89.

== Discography ==
[dates are for album releases; later Davis compilations are not listed.]

- Live-Evil (Columbia, 1971)
- On the Corner (Columbia, 1972)
- In Concert (Columbia, 1973) – rec. 1972
- Get Up with It (Columbia, 1974)
- Big Fun (Columbia, 1974)
- Circle in the Round (Columbia, 1979)
