= Pete Cosey =

American guitarist (1943–2012)

- Cosey in the mid 1970s

Background information
- Born: Peter Palus Cosey; October 9, 1943; Chicago, Illinois, U.S.
- Died: May 30, 2012 (aged 68) Chicago, Illinois
- Genres: Jazz, blues
- Occupation: Musician
- Instrument: Electric guitar
- Years active: 1960s–2012
- Formerly of: Miles Davis, Burnt Sugar

Peter Palus Cosey (October 9, 1943 – May 30, 2012) was an American guitarist who played with Miles Davis' band between 1973 and 1975. His fiercely flanged and distorted guitar invited comparisons to Jimi Hendrix. Cosey kept a low profile for much of his career and released no solo recorded works. He appeared on Davis's albums Get Up with It (1974), Agharta (1975), Pangaea (1976), Dark Magus (1977), and The Complete On the Corner Sessions (2007).

== Biography ==
=== Early life ===
Cosey was born in Chicago, Illinois. He was the only child of a musical family. His father and mother wrote for Louis Jordan and Eddie "Cleanhead" Vinson and his father played for Sidney Bechet and Josephine Baker. Following the death of his father, Cosey and his mother moved to Phoenix, Arizona, where he spent his teenage years and began developing his guitar style.

=== Early career ===
Prior to joining the Miles Davis band in 1973, Cosey was a busy session guitarist with Chess Records, playing on records by Jerry Butler, John Klemmer, Fontella Bass ("Rescue Me"), Rotary Connection, Howlin' Wolf (The Howlin' Wolf Album), Muddy Waters (Electric Mud, After the Rain) and Little Milton.

Cosey was also an early member of Chicago's Association for the Advancement of Creative Musicians (AACM). He was an early member of the Pharaohs, and a group with drummer Maurice White and bassist Louis Satterfield that eventually evolved into Earth, Wind & Fire. Some of his pre-Miles jazz playing is available on albums by Phil Cohran's Artistic Heritage Ensemble.

After joining Davis, Cosey performed on the albums Get Up with It, Dark Magus, Agharta and Pangaea. By 1975, Cosey had developed an advanced guitar approach—involving numerous alternative tunings, guitars restrung in unusual patterns and a post-Hendrix palette of distortion, wah-wah and guitar synth effects—that has influenced many adventurous guitarists, including Henry Kaiser and Vernon Reid.

Following the 1975 break-up of the Miles Davis band, Cosey largely disappeared from public view. After performing on the title track of Herbie Hancock's Future Shock (1983), he did not appear on record again until Akira Sakata's Fisherman's.com (with Sakata, Bill Laswell and Hamid Drake) in 2000. Throughout the '80s, he was involved in a number of Chicago- and New York-based groups with various musicians, but no recordings have been released. In 1987, he replaced Bill Frisell in the trio Power Tools with bassist Melvin Gibbs and drummer Ronald Shannon Jackson (a live recording is available through RSJ's website).

=== 2000s ===
In 2001, he started a group called Children of Agharta to explore the electric Miles Davis repertoire. The first line-up was Cosey, Gary Bartz, John Stubblefield, Matt Rubano, J. T. Lewis, and DJ Johnny Juice Rosado (studio DJ for Public Enemy). The group's booking agency was listing the band as a quartet of Cosey, Bartz, Melvin Gibbs and Doni Hagen.

In 2003, Cosey appeared on an episode of American television's The People's Court, successfully suing a promoter for failing to pay fully for a Children of Agharta gig.

Cosey was also a featured soloist with the group Burnt Sugar on their album The Rites.

In 2004, Cosey appeared in the Godfathers and Sons episode of Martin Scorsese's documentary series The Blues. The episode followed Marshall Chess and Chuck D (of Public Enemy) reuniting the musicians from Muddy Waters' Electric Mud album to record a new track.

In July 2006, Cosey was fleetingly glimpsed during the finale of Bill Laswell's PBS Soundstage concert (his performance having been edited out of the broadcast).

In 2003, Cosey scored a short film, directed by Eli Mavros, entitled Alone Together. Cosey and Mavros had met the previous year during production of Mark Levin's episode for the PBS Blues series. After appearing on Eli's college blues radio show, Shake Em On Down, on New York University's radio station, 89.1 FM WNYU, he agreed to score the film. In the spirit of jazz and spontaneity, the soundtrack to the film was improvised by Cosey in real time over several takes, with several different instruments; no two takes were the same. He played guitar (using several distortion pedals, often bowing the strings like a violin), African thumb piano, and a zither given to him by Miles Davis. The film went on to show at several small film festivals.

In 2007-08, Cosey contributed to the CD Miles from India, which celebrates the music of Miles Davis. It features many former Miles sidemen and Indian musicians, with Cosey playing on five tracks: "Ife (Fast)", "It's About That Time", "Miles Runs the Voodoo Down", "Great Expectations", and "Ife (Slow)".

=== Death ===
Pete Cosey died on May 30, 2012, of complications following surgery at Vanguard Weiss Memorial Hospital in Chicago. Although he spent most of his life in Chicago, he was living in nearby Evanston, Illinois.

== Instruments and equipment ==
Cosey was known for playing in a variety of guitar tunings; a friend commented he had a different tuning for each song. With Davis, he played a Guild S-100 (Agharta, Pangaea) and two 1950s Gibson Les Pauls (Dark Magus). Live he also used a Vox Phantom 12-string guitar and a Morris Mando Mania. Unusually, Cosey tuned his 12-string to polyphonic intervals, rather than customary octaves/unison. He used a variety of effects (on stage he had those set up on a table in front of him, with assorted percussion instruments) including two wah pedals. An early fan of the guitar synthesizer, he played an EMS Synthi A synthesizer and later an Ibanez MIDI controller, a Roland guitar synth, and a Yamaha TX81Z.
