= Jack Chambers (linguist) =

Canadian linguist (1938–2026)

- Born: 12 July 1938; Grimsby, Ontario, Canada
- Died: 2 March 2026 (aged 87)
- Known for: Linguistic variation

Academic background
- Education: Queen's University (MA); University of Alberta (PhD)

Academic work
- Discipline: Linguistics
- Institutions: University of Toronto
- Notable ideas: Canadian raising

John Kenneth Chambers (12 July 1938 – 2 March 2026) was a Canadian linguist, and a well-known expert on language variation and change, who played an important role in research on Canadian English beginning in the 1980s. He coined the terms "Canadian Raising" and "Canadian Dainty", the latter used for Canadian speech that mimics the British, popular till the mid-20th century.

Born in Grimsby, Ontario, Chambers was a professor of linguistics at the University of Toronto since receiving his Ph.D. from the University of Alberta in 1970. He was also a visiting professor at many universities worldwide, including Hong Kong University, University of Szeged, Hungary, University of Kiel in Germany, Canterbury University in New Zealand, the University of Reading and the University of York in the United Kingdom. He was the author of the website Dialect Topography, which compiles information about dialectal variation across Canada.

Chambers also wrote extensively on jazz, including such figures as Miles Davis and Duke Ellington.

Chambers died at the age of 87 on 2 March 2026, from pancreatic cancer.

== Bibliography ==
His works include:

- 1975 Canadian English: Origins and Structures
- 1979 The Languages of Canada
- 1983 Milestones I: The Music and Times of Miles Davis to 1960
- 1985 Milestones II: The Music and Times of Miles Davis since 1960
- 1991 Dialects of English: Studies in Grammatical Variation (with Peter Trudgill)
- 1998 Dialects and Accents (with David Britain)
- 1998 Dialectology (with Peter Trudgill)
- 2002 The Handbook of Language Variation and Change (with Peter Trudgill and Natalie Schilling-Estes)
- 2003 Sociolinguistic Theory: Linguistic Variation and Its Social Significance. Third, revised edition (first ed. published in 1995)

== See also ==
- Linguistic marketplace

== Other notable Canadian dialectologists ==
- Walter S. Avis
- Charles Boberg
- Sali Tagliamonte
- Sandra Clarke
- Robert J. Gregg
