= Paul Tingen =

Dutch-born music writer

Paul Tingen is a Dutch-born music writer. Tingen wrote Miles Beyond: The Electric Explorations of Miles Davis, 1967–1991, published in 2001. He has a monthly column in Sound on Sound magazine, and he writes music articles for other publications.

== Education ==
Tingen studied guitar and recording at the Royal Conservatoire in The Hague and completed a music degree at Goldsmiths' College in London.

== Author ==
Tingen first gained notice as a rock critic, based in Scotland.

Tingen researched and wrote Miles Beyond, The Electric Explorations of Miles Davis, 1967–1991 published by Watson-Guptill in 2001. It includes testimonies of many famous musicians who worked with Davis, including Herbie Hancock, Chick Corea, Dave Holland, Jack DeJohnette, Marcus Miller and John Scofield, as well as members of Davis' 1973-1975 band, including Michael Henderson, Reggie Lucas, and Pete Cosey. All About Jazz wrote that Tingen's book serves as the definitive guide to Davis' controversial electric period. Kirkus Reviews wrote that Tingen's book was "a valuable revisionist look" at Miles' electric period, though it was "unlikely to convince hard-core jazz fans" to listen more closely to these albums.

== Personal life ==
Tingen is a member of the Order of Interbeing, the core order of Vietnamese Zen master Thich Nhat Hanh, and has facilitated meditation classes in this tradition. In 1996 he founded the Heart of London Sangha.

Tingen recorded one solo CD, May The Road Rise To Meet You (1997), and has performed live on the guitar.

After having lived in the UK and the US during 1986–2005, Tingen divides his time between the UK and the south-west of France, where he lives with his partner and their two children.
