= Teo Macero =

American jazz saxophonist, composer, and record producer (1925–2008)

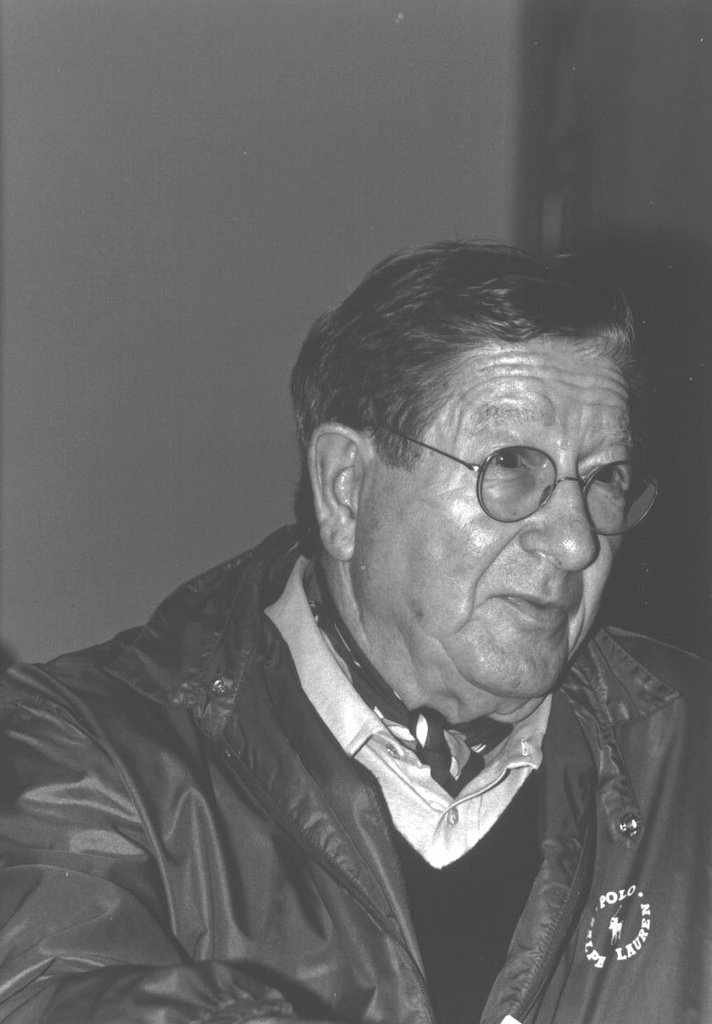
- Macero in 1996

Background information
- Born: Attilio Joseph Macero; October 30, 1925; Glens Falls, New York, U.S.
- Died: February 19, 2008 (aged 82) Riverhead, New York, U.S.
- Genres: Jazz, classical, third stream, orchestral jazz, fusion
- Occupations: Composer, musician, producer
- Instrument: Saxophone
- Years active: 1953–2008
- Label: Columbia
- Formerly of: Miles Davis; Charles Mingus; Thelonious Monk; Dave Brubeck

Attilio Joseph "Teo" Macero (October 30, 1925 – February 19, 2008) was an American jazz record producer, saxophonist, and composer. He was a producer at Columbia Records for twenty years. Macero produced Miles Davis' Bitches Brew and Dave Brubeck's Time Out, two of the best-selling and most influential jazz albums of all time. Macero was known for his innovative use of editing and tape manipulation unprecedented in jazz and proving influential on subsequent fusion, experimental rock, electronica, post-punk, no wave, and acid jazz.

== Biography ==
=== Early work ===
Teo Macero was born and raised in Glens Falls, New York, United States. After serving in the United States Navy, he moved to New York City in 1948 to attend the Juilliard School of Music. He studied composition, and graduated from Juilliard in 1953 with Bachelor's and Master's degrees.

In 1953, Macero co-founded Charles Mingus' Jazz Composers Workshop, and became a major contributor to the New York City avant-garde jazz scene. As a composer, Macero wrote in an atonal style, as well as in third stream, a synthesis of jazz and classical music. He performed live, and recorded several albums with Mingus and the other Workshop members over the next three years, including Jazzical Moods (in 1954) and Jazz Composers Workshop (in 1955).

During this time, Macero also recorded Explorations (DLP-6). While he had contributed compositions to other albums, this was the first full album of his own compositions, and Macero's first album as a leader. Macero plays tenor and alto saxophones on the album, and is joined by Orlando DiGirolamo on accordion, both Mingus and Lou Labella on basses, and Ed Shaughnessy on drums. Explorations was originally released in 1954 on Mingus' Debut Records, and was reissued on CD in 2006 on Fresh Sounds Records, with additional tracks.

The 1958 short experimental film Bridges-Go-Round by filmmaker Shirley Clarke featured two alternative soundtracks, one by Louis and Bebe Barron and one by Macero.

=== Composer and arranger ===
Macero's first projects for Columbia included one side of What's New?, an album of original music in the emerging Third Stream genre that was shared with Bob Prince as well as arrangements for the first Johnny Mathis album.

Macero continued to compose and arrange for a variety of artists during his time as a producer at Columbia, contributing tracks to (and still producing) several albums including Monk's Monk's Blues, and Something New, Something Blue, a collection of blues compositions and arrangements by Macero, Teddy Charles, Manny Albam, and Bill Russo. He contributed a track to (and produced) John Lewis and Gunther Schuller's Orchestra U.S.A. album, Sonorities, an album of third stream compositions, and he arranged music for easy listening pioneer, André Kostelanetz.

He composed, conducted, and produced numerous television and film soundtracks and scores. He scored the 1970 Muhammad Ali documentary, a.k.a. Cassius Clay, and produced soundtrack music for True Romance, Finding Forrester, and Martin Scorsese's The Blues.

Macero also composed for, conducted, and performed with Leonard Bernstein and the New York Philharmonic, the London Philharmonic Orchestra, the Salt Lake Symphony, the Kansas City Symphony, and the Juilliard School; and was commissioned by, and composed ballets for, the Joffrey Ballet Company, the Anna Sokolow Ballet Company, the London Ballet Company, the Juilliard Ballet Company, and the American Ballet Theatre.

=== Columbia Records producer ===
Macero found greater fame as a producer for Columbia Records. He joined in 1957, and produced hundreds of records while at the label, working with dozens of artists including Charles Mingus, Duke Ellington, Ella Fitzgerald, Thelonious Monk, Johnny Mathis, Count Basie, Dave Brubeck, Tony Bennett, Charlie Byrd, Maynard Ferguson, Stan Getz, Andre Kostelanetz and Les and Larry Elgart. He was also responsible for signing Mingus, Monk, and Byrd to Columbia. Additionally, Macero produced over 100 albums of classical orchestral music for Columbia, including less conventional, contemporary pieces such as And God Created Great Whales by Alan Hovhaness, which required him to overlay recordings of humpbacked whale songs on to the orchestral track.

Macero produced the seminal Dave Brubeck Quartet album Time Out, and Thelonious Monk's first Columbia recording, Monk's Dream, as well as his Underground. He also produced Mingus' first Columbia album, Mingus Ah Um. Macero is also acknowledged on the 1973 Mingus album Let My Children Hear Music, for "his untiring efforts in producing the best album I have ever made." Beyond jazz, he was an associate producer on a number of Broadway original cast recordings including A Chorus Line and Bye Bye Birdie. And he produced the soundtrack to The Graduate, by Simon and Garfunkel. In another deviation from his standard focus on jazz, Macero produced Irish folk albums with the Clancy Brothers and Tommy Makem in the late 1960s.

While Macero produced many artists' albums, he had an especially long and prolific relationship with Miles Davis. He produced or co-produced most of Davis' Columbia catalog including the classics Sketches of Spain and Someday My Prince Will Come. Macero's role of producer was further expanded on Davis' later forays into electric fusion, such as In a Silent Way, Bitches Brew, and A Tribute to Jack Johnson, which were highlighted by Macero's innovative mixing and editing techniques. In 2001, Miles Davis biographer Paul Tingen likened Macero's role in the electric music of Davis to that of George Martin with the Beatles. Taking his cue from Tingen, Nick Southall described the impact of Macero's work on In a Silent Way in a 2003 Stylus Magazine article:

Behind the scenes, Miles and Teo took the tapes of the In a Silent Way sessions and transformed some beautiful, folk-tinged, melody-driven sets into two exquisite, beguiling and otherworldly pieces of music. Using techniques that pre-dated the proliferation of tape loops, cut-ups, edits and sequencing in rock, pop, hip hop and dance music, Miles and Teo took apart the original recording and reassembled them outside of any traditional or accepted jazz structure or melodic framework. This idea of taking jazz away from its birth, genesis and flowering as a live art and into the studio would soon become standard practice, but in 1969 it was groundbreaking.

Some listeners and critics have complained that Macero overproduced Davis' recordings, and cut too much. But after hearing the unedited tapes from the In a Silent Way sessions, jazz critic John Ballon wrote that the original editing and production "attests to the producing genius of Teo Macero." Ballon continues:

It took a force like Teo to splice together a cohesive album out of so many inspired pieces. Not only did Teo have the balls to stand up to Miles on creative decisions, he had the right. And Miles knew it. And while his ego rebelled against any producer messing with his music, Miles knew that incredibly great records were borne out of the conflict and compromise of his relationship with Teo.

On Davis' 1970 release Bitches Brew, Macero continued to expand his innovative practices, and "Bitches Brew not only became a controversial classic of musical innovation, it also became renowned for its pioneering use of studio technology." Some of the controversy at the time also stemmed from the use of the word bitches in the title. Macero recalls that when Davis told him that he wanted to call it Bitches Brew, "I thought he was kidding." The album became the best-selling jazz album of its time, selling 500,000 copies by 1976, when most successful jazz albums sold less than 30,000 copies.

Macero produced M.F. Horn 3 for Maynard Ferguson in 1973 as well as Ferguson's next album in 1974, M.F. Horn 4&5: Live At Jimmy's. On that album, Ferguson can be heard thanking Macero, noting that Macero "is sitting out in the street in the mobile thing" monitoring the recording. The album includes the piece Teonova in Macero's honor.

Macero's innovative techniques were inspired partially by his association with avant-garde composer Edgard Varèse, and they continue to impact the way musicians, producers, and remixers work in the studio today. Brian Eno, a producer who has worked extensively with U2 and Talking Heads, among others, talked about Macero's influence on him in a 1996 interview with jazzthetik magazine. Eno describes being "fascinated" by Macero's editing techniques and the "spatial" quality he added to the music. "He did something that was extremely modern."

In 1975, Macero left Columbia and formed his own production company. However, he continued to work with Davis until 1983 and continued to produce records for Columbia throughout his career.

=== Other work ===
After his tenure at Columbia, Macero continued as a player and producer on other projects, working with Brubeck, Tony Bennett, Herbie Hancock, Asha Puthli, Michel Legrand, Wallace Roney, Shirley MacLaine, Vernon Reid, Robert Palmer, and DJ Logic.

In the 1970s and 1980s, Macero released a handful of his own albums, including Time Plus Seven, Impressions of Charles Mingus, and Acoustical Suspension, before founding his own label, Teorecords, in 1999. Subsequently, he released over a dozen albums of original compositions, and continued to produce reissues of Miles Davis and other artists for various record companies. However, Macero was outspoken in his opposition to the practice of adding back alternate takes that didn't appear on the original albums, or otherwise altering the original music, on the grounds that it corrupts the intentions of the musicians and the producer at the time the recording was made. "They put all the mistakes back in," said Macero. "Don't destroy the original record."

=== Films ===
A Teo Macero documentary film, Play That, Teo, is being directed and produced by Olana DiGirolamo, daughter of Macero's friend and collaborator, Orlando DiGirolamo. Shot by cinematographer Fortunato Procopio, the film features a behind-the-scenes look at the person behind the persona, and includes photos, archival footage, and recordings from Macero's personal collection.

A short film, Teo, was filmed by producer/director Daragh McCarthy and features Teo Macero's last recording session and extensive interviews.

=== Tributes ===
Both Miles Davis and Thelonious Monk dedicated a song titled Teo to Macero: Davis in the 1961 album Someday My Prince Will Come, Monk in the 1964 album Monk. The song Teonova (Dedicated to Teo Macero), written by Pete Jackson, appears on the 1974 Maynard Ferguson album M.F. Horn 4&5: Live At Jimmy's, produced by Macero. The Wayne Shorter composition Teo's Bag appears on Davis's 1979 album Circle in the Round.

== Death ==
On the evening of February 19, 2008, Macero died in his sleep, having long suffered from pneumonia. He was 82.

== Awards ==
- BMI Student Composer Award in 1953
- Two Guggenheim Fellowships for composition in 1957 and 1958
- National Endowment for the Arts grant in 1974
- Over 20 RIAA Gold, Platinum, and Multi-platinum certifications

== Discography ==
=== As leader ===
- Explorations (Debut, 1953)
- What's New? (Columbia, 1956)
- Teo (Prestige, 1957)
- Impressions of Charles Mingus (Palo Alto, 1983)
- Acoustical Suspension (Doctor Jazz, 1985)
- Impressions of Thelonious Monk (Teo, 2003)

=== As sideman ===
With Miles Davis

- In a Silent Way (Columbia, 1969)
- Jack Johnson (Columbia, 1971) – recorded in 1970
- On the Corner (Columbia, 1972)

With Kip Hanrahan

- Coup de Tete (American Clave, 1981)
- Desire Develops an Edge (American Clave, 1983)

With Michel Legrand

- Legrand Jazz (Columbia, 1958)
- Michel Legrand Meets Miles Davis (Philips, 1970)

With Charles Mingus

- The Moods of Mingus (Savoy, 1955)
- Jazz Composers Workshop (Savoy, 1956)
- The Jazz Experiments of Charlie Mingus (Bethlehem, 1957)

With others

- Dave Brubeck, Jazz Collection (Columbia, 1995)
- Charlie Byrd, Byrdland (Columbia, 1966)
- Al Foster, Mixed Roots (CBS/Sony, 1978)
- Lionel Hampton, Saturday Night Jazz Fever (Laurie, 1978)
- Kenyon Hopkins, Rooms (Cadence, 1957)
- Marty Manning, The Twilight Zone (Columbia, 1961)
- Gunther Schuller & George Russell, Brandeis Jazz Festival (CBS/Sony, 1977)
- Charles Thompson, Rockin' Rhythm (Columbia, 1961)

=== As producer (selected discography) ===
For Miles Davis

- Sketches of Spain (1960)
- Someday My Prince Will Come (1961)
- Seven Steps to Heaven (1963)
- My Funny Valentine (1965)
- Miles Smiles (1967)
- Bitches Brew (1970)
- Jack Johnson (1971)

For Charles Mingus

- Mingus Ah Um (1959)
- Mingus Dynasty (1960)
- Let My Children Hear Music (1972)

For Thelonious Monk

- Monk's Dream (1963)
- Criss-Cross (1963)
- Monk (1964)
- Underground (1967)
- Straight, No Chaser (1967)
- Monk's Blues (1968)
