= Agharta (album) =

Live album by Miles Davis
- Released: August 1975
- Recorded: February 1, 1975
- Venue: Festival Hall (Osaka)
- Genres: Jazz-rock; funk rock; avant-garde; ambient
- Length: 97:34
- Label: CBS/Sony
- Producer: Teo Macero

Miles Davis release chronology
Get Up with It (1974)	Agharta (1975)	Live at the Plugged Nickel (1976)

Miles Davis live recording chronology
Dark Magus (1974)	Agharta (1975)	Pangaea (1975)

Alternate cover
- 1976 North American edition

Agharta is a 1975 live double album by American jazz trumpeter, composer, and bandleader Miles Davis. By the time he recorded the album, Davis was 48 years old and had alienated many in the jazz community while attracting younger rock audiences with his radical electric fusion music. After experimenting with different line-ups, he established a stable live band in 1973 and toured constantly for the next two years, despite physical pain from worsening health and emotional instability brought on by substance abuse. During a three-week tour of Japan in 1975, the trumpeter performed two concerts at the Festival Hall in Osaka on February 1; the afternoon show produced Agharta, and the evening show was released as Pangaea the following year.

Davis led a septet at the concert; he, saxophonist Sonny Fortune, and guitarist Pete Cosey were given space to improvise against a dense backdrop of riffs, electronic effects, cross-beats, and funk grooves from the rhythm section – drummer Al Foster, bassist Michael Henderson, guitarist Reggie Lucas, and percussionist James Mtume. Davis controlled their rhythmic and musical direction with hand and head gestures, phrases played on his wah-wah processed trumpet, and drones from an accompanying electronic organ. The evolving nature of the performance led to the widespread misunderstanding that it had no compositional basis, while its dark, angry, and somber musical qualities were seen as a reflection of the bandleader's emotional and spiritual state at the time.

Agharta was first released in Japan by CBS/Sony in August 1975 just before Davis temporarily retired due to increasingly poor health and exhaustion. At the record label's suggestion, it was titled after the legendary subterranean city. Davis enlisted Japanese artist Tadanori Yokoo to design its artwork, which depicted the cityscape of an advanced civilization with elements inspired by Eastern subterranean myths, Afrofuturism, and ufology. An alternate cover was produced for its 1976 release in North America by Columbia Records.

A highly divisive record, Agharta further challenged Davis' jazz audience and was widely panned by contemporary critics; reviewers found the music discordant and complained of Cosey's loud guitar sounds and Davis' sparse trumpet playing. It was reevaluated positively in subsequent years, however, as a generation of younger musicians was influenced by the band's abrasive music and cathartic playing, particularly Cosey's effects-laden free improvisations. Agharta has since been viewed as an important jazz-rock record, a dramatically dynamic group performance, and the culmination of Davis' electric period spanning the late 1960s and mid-1970s.

== Background ==
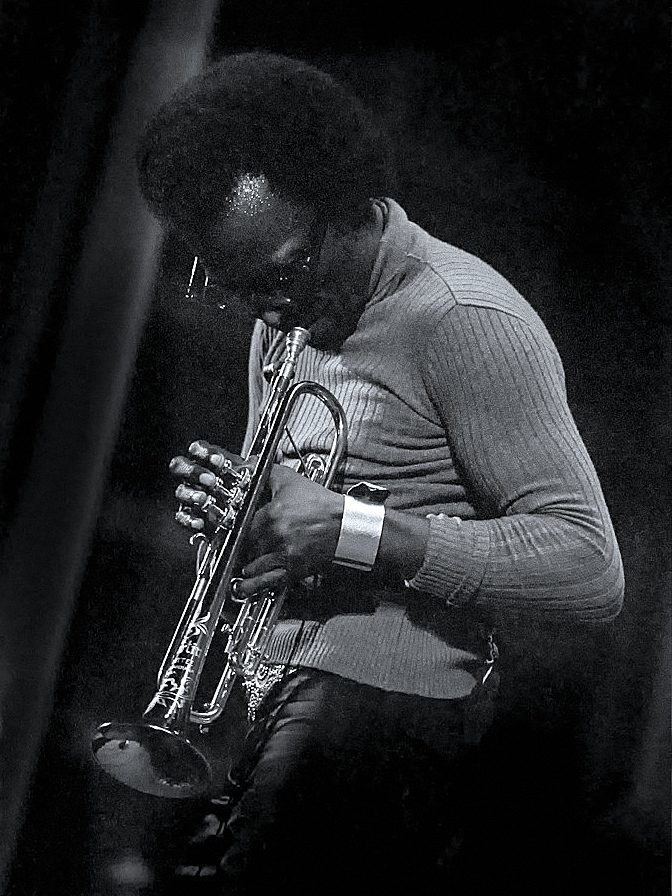
Miles Davis in 1971

In the early 1970s, Miles Davis continued exploring directions radically different from the jazz music that made him renowned in the 1950s and 1960s. The music from this electric period in his career found him experimenting with rock, funk, African rhythms, emerging electronic music technology, and an ever-changing lineup of musicians who played electric instruments. The trumpeter attracted younger audiences as his fusion music became more radical and abstract while alienating older listeners, musicians, and critics in the jazz scene who accused him of selling out. After recording his 1972 On the Corner album, Davis began to focus more on performing live, working in the studio only sporadically and haphazardly; the 1974 releases Big Fun and Get Up with It compiled recordings he made between 1969 and 1974.

By 1973, Davis had established most of his band's line-up, a septet featuring bassist Michael Henderson, guitarists Pete Cosey and Reggie Lucas, drummer Al Foster, percussionist James Mtume, and saxophonist Dave Liebman; Liebman left the group the following year and was replaced by Sonny Fortune. Lucas, Henderson, Foster, and Mtume functioned as the band's rhythm section, while Cosey, and Fortune were given space to improvise as soloists. Their concerts – played frequently at rock venues and festivals – became opportunities for Davis and his sidemen to test new musical ideas and ways to exploit electronic equipment.

Davis toured relentlessly for two years while tolerating intense physical pain and difficulty walking, caused by joint pain from sickle-cell anaemia, badly damaged ankles after a 1972 car wreck, and osteoporosis in his left hip, which had been operated on a decade earlier. He had also developed nodules on his larynx that often left him short of breath, especially when playing the trumpet. To numb the pain, he became increasingly dependent on self-medicating with painkillers, cocaine, and morphine, which combined with his alcohol and recreational drug use led to mood swings; he would by turns feel vulnerable and hostile. By the end of 1974, a disappointing showing in DownBeat magazine's readers poll reinforced to Davis that his reputation had diminished. Unfazed by detractors and personal troubles, he kept his touring schedule intense. As Henderson recounted:

He was like the general looking at the fort and they had a moat and we were going to get in that fort. That was the attitude of the band. We didn't give a shit what the critics said. People are gonna like what they like, but if you don't like it, respect it. Respect that I have the right to do what I do. Because with or without you, we're going to do it anyway.

=== Tour of Japan ===
In 1975, the 48-year old Davis embarked on a three-week tour of Japan. Between January 22 and February 8, he played 14 concerts in large-hall venues to capacity crowds and enthusiastic reviews. Japanese critic Keizo Takada said at the time that Davis is leading his "magnificent and energetic" band just as Duke Ellington had his orchestra: "Miles must be the genius of managing men and bringing out their hidden talent."

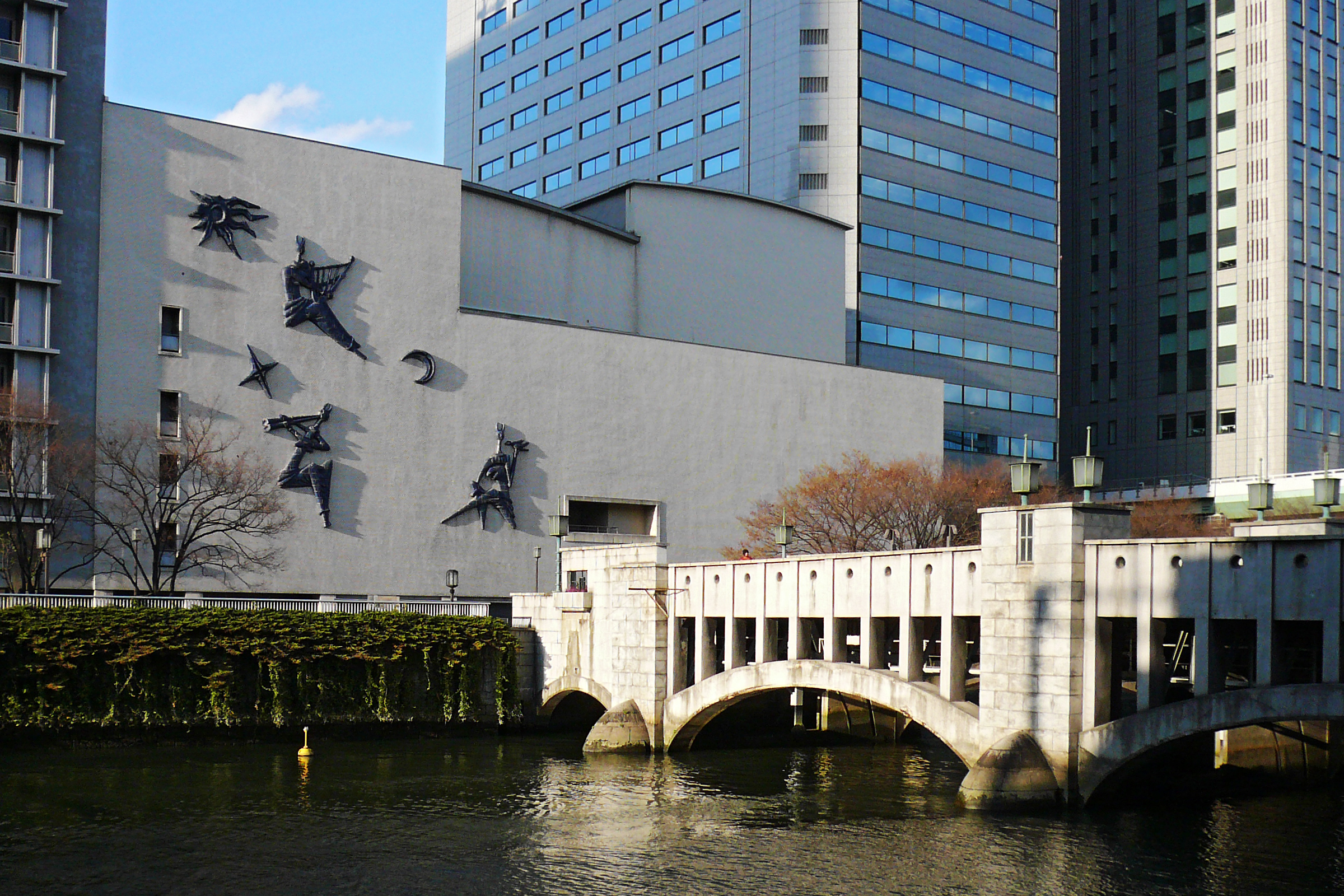
Festival Hall (left center) in Osaka, where Agharta was recorded

Throughout the tour, Davis was sick with pneumonia and a bleeding ulcer that grew worse, while his hip occasionally and unpredictably slipped out of its socket. Unable to work his trumpet's volume and effects pedals because of the pain in his legs, he would go down on his knees to press them with his hand during performances. To relieve his pain and perform, he used codeine and morphine, smoked, and drank large quantities of Heineken beer. On several occasions, Davis was able to play two concerts in one day, as he did on February 1 at the Festival Hall in Osaka.

The Festival Hall performances were recorded by Japan's CBS/Sony record label under the supervision of Teo Macero, Davis' producer of 15 years. "The Japanese people were very beautiful", Henderson recalled from the concerts. "They came in with their suit and ties on and we proceeded to blow the roof off the suckers with a million amplifiers."

== Composition and performance ==
Our concerts began like a balloon that was incredibly compressed. After that it was a matter of gradually letting the air out. The energy it took us to play at that level was enormous. There were times that we had to lie down after we had finished playing. Before the concert we'd build this energy up. We looked at each other, and said, "Let's go through the wall." That was our slogan. It meant taking it as far as we could physically. To stay at that level of concentration and energy for two to three hours was going through the wall.

— James Mtume (2001)

For the first of the afternoon concert's two sets, the band performed the compositions "Tatu", "Agharta Prelude", and "Maiysha" (from Get Up with It), making up Agharta's first disc of music. The second-set performances of "Right Off" (from Davis' 1971 Jack Johnson album), "Ife" (from Big Fun), and "Wili (= For Dave)" spanned the second disc; between the "Right Off" and "Ife" segments, the band improvised a passage based on "So What" (from the 1959 album Kind of Blue) for 41 seconds after Henderson started to play its ostinato. The pieces were performed in medleys, which were given generic track titles on Agharta, such as "Prelude" and "Interlude". As with his other live releases in the 1970s, Davis refused to have individual compositions specified in the track listing because he felt critics and other listeners often overlooked the music's intrinsic meaning by indulging in abstract musical analysis. "I'm not doing anything, it doesn't need an explanation", he later told Leonard Feather. Music scholars were able to identify the pieces through an examination of what Davis researcher Enrico Merlin called "coded phrases", which Davis played on trumpet or organ to signify the end of one segment and direct the band toward the next section. He first used such cues and modulations when recording "Flamenco Sketches" in 1959, Merlin said.

The pieces featured on Agharta were part of a typical set list for the group, but their performances of each sometimes changed almost beyond recognition from concert to concert. This, along with the track names, led to the widespread misunderstanding that the music was mostly or entirely improvised and unstructured. Lucas explained that the band started each performance with a "very defined compositional basis" before developing it further in a highly structured yet "very free way"; the "Right Off" segment, for instance, was improvised from the original recording's E♭ riff. Davis had the band play around a single chord in a piece for several minutes with variations as each member performed in a different time signature; Foster might have been playing in common time and Mtume in compound duple metre or septuple time, while the guitarists would comp in another tempo altogether. "That's a lot of intricate shit we were working off this one chord", Davis remarked. From Lucas' perspective, this kind of "structured improvisation" resulted in significant interplay between the rhythm section and allowed the band to improvise "a lot more than just the notes that were being played in the solos; we were improvising the entire song as we went along."

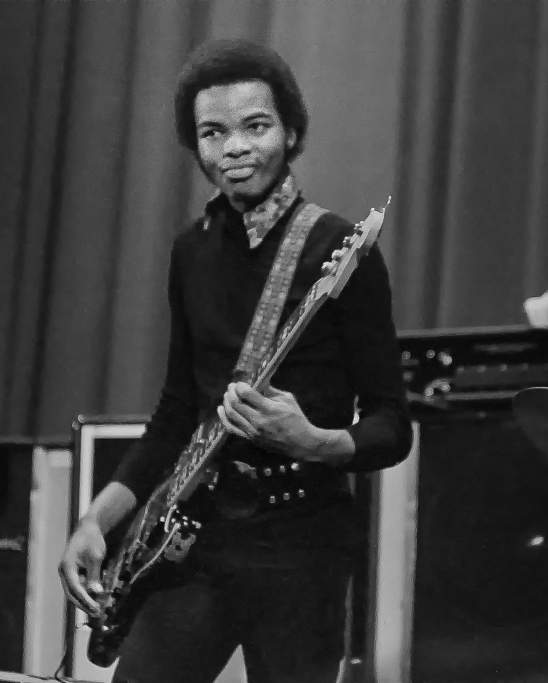
Michael Henderson (1971), the bassist in Davis' rhythm section

Like Pangaea and Dark Magus – the two other live albums showcasing the septet – Agharta revealed what Amiri Baraka described as Davis' affinity for minimalism. He abandoned melodic and harmonic conventions in favor of riffs, cross-rhythms, and funk grooves as a backdrop for soloists to improvise throughout. Davis had preferred understated compositions throughout his career but by the mid 1970s he showed a deeper embrace of rhythm, inspired by Afrocentric politics. When Mtume and Cosey joined the band, his live music lost most of its "European sensibilities" and "settled down into a deep African thing, a deep African-American groove" emphasizing rhythm and drums rather than individual solos, Davis said, although he did not completely reject melody. "We ain't in Africa, and we don't play just chants. There's some theory under what we do."

Categorizing Agharta as a jazz-rock record, Simon Reynolds wrote in The Wire that the music "offered a drastic intensification of rock's three most radical aspects: space, timbre, and groove". In Martha Bayles' opinion, it drew from jazz only in its element of free improvisation and from rock only in its use of electronics and "ear-bleeding volume". The album also showcased Davis' avant-garde impulses and exploration of ambient sounds. According to Greg Tate, the septet created "a pan-ethnic web of avant-garde music", while Sputnikmusic's Hernan M. Campbell said they explored "progressive ambiences" particularly within the record's second half; Phil Alexander from Mojo characterized Agharta as "both ambient yet thrashing, melodic yet coruscating", and suggestive of Karlheinz Stockhausen's electronic experiments.

=== Dynamics and effects ===
During the concert, Davis directed approximately 50 stops or breaks to the band, particularly the rhythm section, by gesturing with his head or hand. These stops served as dramatic turning points in the tension-release structure of the performances, changing their tempo and allowing the band to alternate between quiet passages and intense climaxes. He also interjected the performances with drone washes from his Yamaha organ, achieving a "strange, nearly perverse presence" that Mikal Gilmore believed "defined the temper" of the music. Lucas said Davis applied a feel for dynamics he had developed earlier in his career playing jazz, but with a greater array of contrasts, including atonal, dissonant chords, and his own bebop trumpet playing set against the group's funk rhythms. "Extreme textures and extreme volume", Lucas explained, "were as much part of the palette as the contrasting chord and rhythmic structures. Being equipped like a full rock band, we sometimes literally blew the walls out."

"Prelude"
A 30-second sample featuring the "Prelude" theme, played on Agharta with more pronounced riffs and tonality

During the "Tatu" and "Agharta Prelude" segments, Davis abruptly stopped and started the septet several times to shift tempos by playing a dissonant, cacophonous organ figure, giving Cosey space to generate eccentric, psychedelic figures and effects. The main theme for "Tatu" had been played at a slower tempo when Cosey first joined the band, but they played it faster as their rapport grew, especially by the time of the Japanese tour. Cosey credited Davis with having the ability to "transmit thoughts and ideas" to the soloists with his playing. According to John Szwed, the "Prelude" theme was played here with more pronounced riffs and tonality than in past performances of the piece.

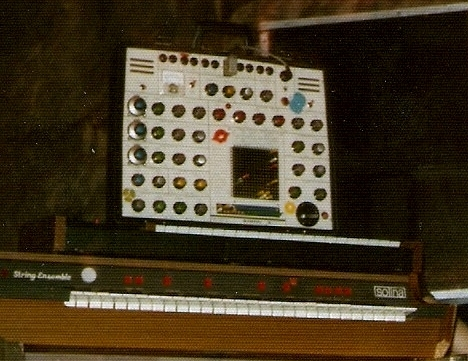
An EMS Synthi A, which Pete Cosey used as an effects unit

The rhythmic direction of the music was occasionally interrupted by densely layered percussive and electronic effects, including repeated whirring and grinding sounds. Cosey generated these sounds by running his guitar through a ring modulator and an EMS Synthi A. The latter device was an early synthesizer with knobs and buttons but no keyboard, making it useful for producing abstract noises rather than exact pitches and melodies. While serving as an effects unit for his improvisations, it was also used by Cosey to suggest a certain soundscape during each performance. "Whether we were in space, or underwater or a group of Africans playing – just different soundscapes", he later explained.

Onstage, Cosey also had a table set up holding a mbira, claves, agogo bells, and several other hand percussion instruments, which he played or struck with a mallet to indicate a different break or stop. "I would hit them just like they do at [boxing] fights!", Cosey recalled. His synthesizer sometimes interacted with the experimental sounds Mtume was able to generate from his drum machine, as during the "Ife" segment. Davis gave the instrument to Mtume after receiving it from Yamaha, the Japanese tour's sponsor, and told him "see what you can do with it." Rather than use it to create rhythms, Mtume processed the drum machine through several different pedals and phase shifters such as the Mu-Tron Bi-Phase, creating a sound he said was "total tapestry". "I'm also using a volume pedal, so I'm bringing the sounds in and out", Mtume recalled. "Unless you were told, you'd have no idea that you heard a rhythm machine."

=== Soloists ===
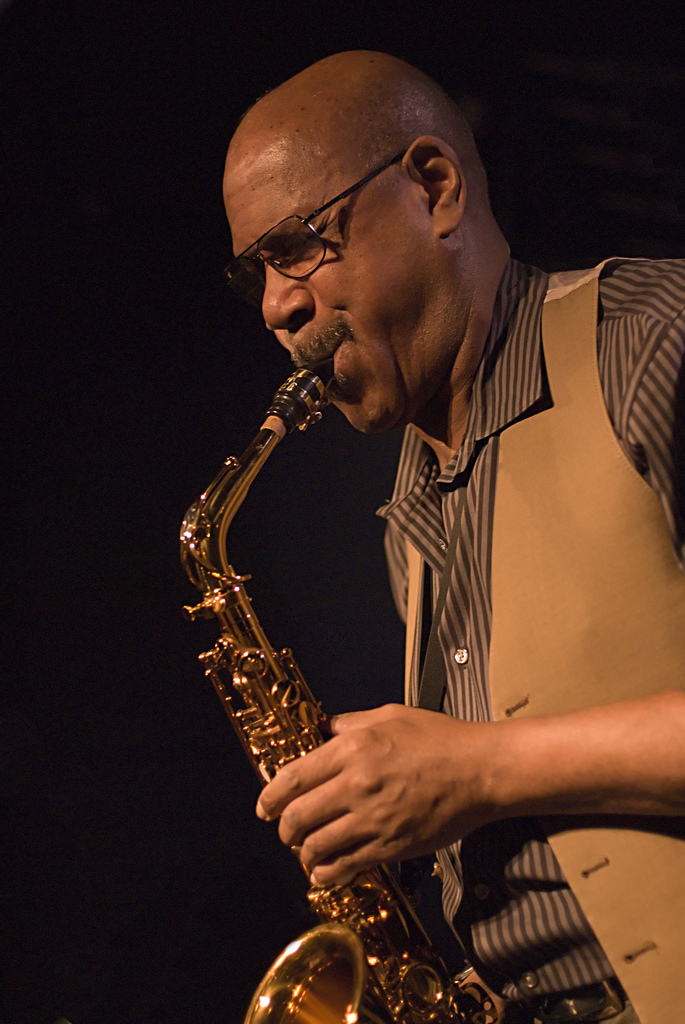
Sonny Fortune (2007), a featured soloist on Agharta

Unlike Davis' previous recordings, the cadenzas throughout Agharta were mostly played by Fortune and Cosey. Fortune alternated between soprano and alto saxophones and the flute, performing with a "substance and structure" Gilmore believed was very much indebted to John Coltrane during his A Love Supreme (1965) period. In his estimation of Fortune's solos on the album, Gilmore said the saxophonist "floats over formidable rhythmic density, taking long and graceful breaks that wing off into a private reverie". Fortune performed his longest alto saxophone solo on "Right Off", which opened the record's second disc in a "propulsive" segment Gilmore said "flies by like a train ride in a dream, where scenes flash past the window in a fascinating and illusive dream".

Cosey played a Guild S-100 electric guitar and heavily employed chromaticism, dissonance, and feedback in his improvisations on Agharta. He alternated between several effects pedals set up underneath his table of percussion instruments, including a fuzzbox for distorting guitar sounds and two different wah-wah pedals he used during solos or when playing more mellow tones. Cosey often arranged his guitar strings in different places on the fretboard and never played in standard tuning, using at least 36 different tuning systems, each of which altered the style and sound of his playing. According to Tzvi Gluckin from Premier Guitar, his experimental guitar playing was rooted in the blues and displayed a sense of phrasing that was aggressive and "blistering" yet "somehow also restrained", particularly in his control of feedback.

Davis had enlisted Cosey to provide his music with sounds from the electric blues and Jimi Hendrix, whose use of distortion and the E♭ tuning was shared by Cosey. According to Charles Shaar Murray, he evoked the guitarist's echoic, free jazz-inspired solos while Lucas performed in the manner of Hendrix's more lyrical rhythm and blues songs; Cosey's guitar was separated to the left channel and Lucas' to the right on Agharta. Jazz scholar Stuart Nicholson wrote that Davis utilized his guitarists in a way which realized the "waves of harmonic distortion" Hendrix had explored in his own music. In Murray's view, the album invoked his influence on the trumpeter more explicitly than any other of his records; Nicholson considered it to be the "closest approximation" to the music they could have recorded together.

=== Davis on trumpet ===
Davis veered from succinct and expressive solos to unsentimental wails during the concert, which suggested he was still mourning Hendrix's 1970 death, Murray surmised. That year, Davis had started playing with a wah-wah pedal affixed to his trumpet in order to emulate the register Hendrix achieved on his guitar. The pedal created what The Penguin Guide to Jazz (2006) described as "surges and ebbs in a harmonically static line, allowing Miles to build huge melismatic variations on a single note". Davis eventually developed what Philip Freeman called "a new tone, the wiggly, shimmering ribbons of sound that are heard on Agharta", where his wah-wah processed solos often sounded frantic and melancholic, like "twisted streams of raw pain".

"Interlude/Theme from Jack Johnson"
A 30-second sample of Davis' final trumpet passage in the "Wili" segment, representative of the sense of melancholy throughout the album.

Davis played his trumpet sparsely throughout the concert, often sounding obscured by the rhythm section. His presence on Agharta reflected what Szwed called "the feel and shape of a musician's late work, an egoless music that precedes its creator's death". Drawing on Theodor W. Adorno's commentary of Ludwig van Beethoven's late works, Szwed said "the disappearance of the musician into the work is a bow to mortality. It was as if Miles were testifying to all that he had been witness to for the past thirty years, both terrifying and joyful." According to Richard Cook, Davis' final trumpet passage from the "Wili (= For Dave)" segment typified a "sense of gloom, even exhaustion", that colored many interpretations of Agharta's "dark" music.

After Lucas' first and only solo of the show climaxed the "Ife" segment, Davis introduced "Wili (= For Dave)" with a few organ chords, culminating in Cosey's final solo and a trumpet passage by Davis, which Paul Tingen characterized as plaintive and introspective. According to him, live music shows typically developed toward reaching a final climax, but Davis' concerts "often dissolved into entropy". On Agharta, Tingen observed a "deep sadness" hanging over the music as the energy of the "Wili (= For Dave)" piece "slowly drained away" to the record's fade out.

== Title and packaging ==
Agharta's title was proposed by CBS/Sony as a reference to the subterranean utopian city. The city's legend was one of several Eastern versions of the Hollow Earth theory, which proposed that an ancient high culture originally lived on the Earth's surface but was forced to flee below because of some political or geological crisis. The myth depicted the city as a divine source of power, claiming that its inhabitants were highly spiritual, advanced beings who would save the Earth from materialism and destructive technology after a cataclysmic event. It was first conceived by 19th-century French thinker Louis Jacolliot as a land ruled by an Ethiopian ruler; Alexandre Saint-Yves d'Alveydre later described it as "drowning in celestial radiances all visible distinctions of race in a single chromatic of light and sound, singularly removed from the usual notions of perspective and acoustics."

The album's artwork was designed by Japanese artist Tadanori Yokoo, who had been creating silkscreen prints on themes of Agharta and the mythical kingdom of Shambhala the year before the Festival Hall concert; his design for Santana's Lotus (1974) featured such themes. In the early 1970s, Yokoo had found his growing popularity in Japan distracting and moved to the United States, where he was able to get more of his work published. After returning to Japan, he received a phone call from Davis, who had seen his art and wanted him to create a cover for Agharta. Before designing the cover, Yokoo listened to a preliminary tape of the concert, meditated, and reflected on his reading of Raymond W. Bernard's 1969 book The Hollow Earth. Bernard had written that the city existed in a large cavern in the center of the Earth where displaced inhabitants of Atlantis had taken refuge following its destruction, using mythological aircraft known as vimanas as transport, although Yokoo said he believed "Agharta could be down there under the sea like Atlantis or even hidden in the jungle like the lost city of El Dorado." Yokoo also drew on elements from other Eastern subterranean myths and Afrofuturism in his design. Critics who eventually saw the album's packaging thought he had been inspired instead by the psychedelic drugs popular at the time.

The back cover design by Tadanori Yokoo, who was inspired by the legendary city of Agartha

The front cover depicted an advanced civilization with a vast landscape of skyscrapers and red, sunburst-like flames rising out of the cityscape as representations of Agharta's power. Yokoo used a combination of collage, airbrushing, and painting techniques as he had with his previous work, along with postcards collected from his trips to Tahiti and New York City; the cityscape on the front cover was taken from one of his postcards. The back cover showed the city submerged in water, embedded in coral reefs, and hovered over by a diver, fish, and a squid ascending from the city. According to graphic designers Storm Thorgerson and Aubrey Powell, Yokoo depicted groups of jellyfish, coral reefs, and brightly colored fish to suggest an association between Agharta and Atlantis. The foreground of the back cover's illustration featured a reptilian creature. Cultural studies researcher Dagmar Buchwald interpreted this image as an allusion to similar ideas about Lemuria; this mythological continent supposedly existed during the Earth's prehistory and was inhabited by an advanced civilization, later forced under the Earth's surface after its homeland was destroyed by a great flood.

A UFO was depicted on the back cover, flying in a spotlight over Agharta, while the album's inside packaging featured images of winged superhuman beings known as the Agharta supermen, who guarded the city's entrances and secret tunnels. An inscription in the LP's gatefold sleeve explained the connection between the UFO and the Agharta supermen:

During various periods in history the supermen of Agharta came to the surface of Earth to teach the human race how to live together in peace and save us from wars, catastrophe, and destruction. The apparent sighting of several flying saucers soon after the bombing of Hiroshima may represent one visitation. (Note: According to Bernard in The Hollow Earth (1969), these inhabitants had originally reached the subterranean world by piloting mythological aircraft known as vimanas through the Earth's "polar openings", later using them to travel between different points of the Earth's interior, and that it was not until the 1945 atomic explosion at Hiroshima during World War II that they piloted back to the surface, leading to the appearance of "flying saucers".)

Agharta's North American release had different artwork designed by John Berg, the art director from Davis' U.S. label, Columbia Records. In its liner notes, an inscription said the record should be listened to at the highest possible volume, and the arrangements were credited to Davis. After it was released, Macero received a complaint from Columbia's accounting department about the trumpeter being compensated $2,500 per arrangement, arguing that none of the music sounded as if it had been arranged.

== Release ==
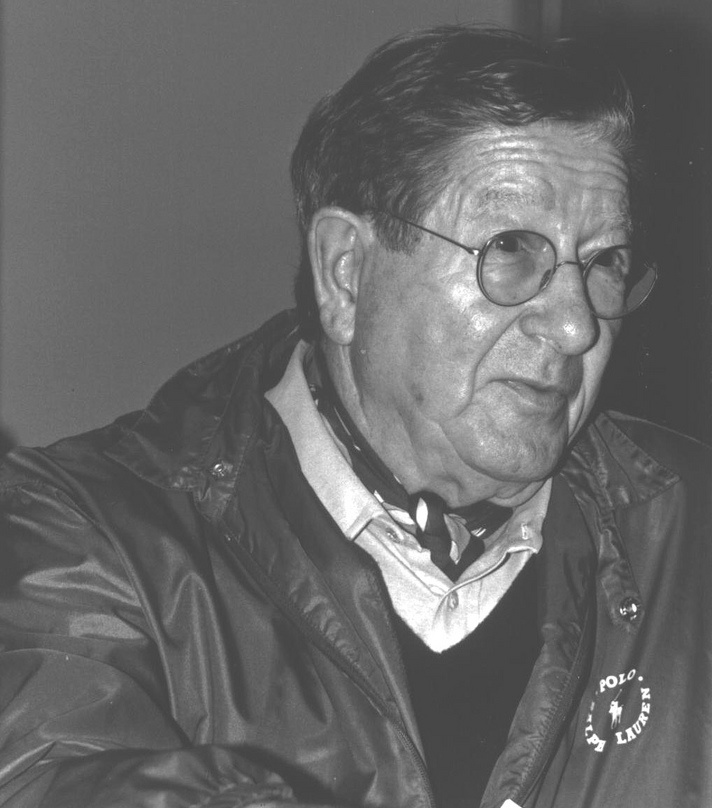
Davis' producer Teo Macero (1996) prepared Agharta's original release.

Davis was reportedly so dissatisfied with his performance on the Festival Hall recordings that he conceded the preparation of their release to Macero. The producer abstained from editing and splicing them with pre-recorded parts, a departure from his usual approach to Davis' electric-era albums. As he later explained to Musician magazine, "the Japanese specifically wanted me to leave in the spacy things." They were released as two double albums – Agharta, featuring the afternoon concert, was first released in Japan in August 1975 and later in North America in 1976; the evening show was issued exclusively in Japan as Pangaea in 1976. (Note: Because Columbia disapproved of Davis' live recordings, both Pangaea and Dark Magus remained Japan-only releases until the 1990s, when they were reissued on CD format.)

Agharta was reissued several times. In January 1991, Columbia re-released it in the U.S. on CD, featuring a remaster Tingen deemed inferior to the original LP in sound and mix quality. "Had the CD been my first introduction, I might never have liked the album much", he said. Sony later remastered Agharta again as part of their Davis reissue campaign and Master Sound series in Japan, with improved sound using Super Bit Mapping. This 1996 Japanese CD edition restored nine additional minutes of atmospheric feedback, percussion, and synthesizer sounds to the end of the final track.

Another remaster of the album was engineered by Mark Wilder and Maria Triana at New York's Battery Studios. It was made available in the U.S. in 2009, when Agharta was one of 52 albums re-issued in mini-LP replica sleeves as a part of Miles Davis: The Complete Columbia Album Collection, a box set commissioned by Sony Legacy. According to Tingen, this edition sounded "like a woolen blanket has been lifted from the previous [1991] CD", clarifying especially Cosey, who had sounded muted in the mix. He still found it somewhat low on bass, which he attributed to the original master tapes: "The LP version also didn't have a lot of bass, but I always assumed this was due to the LP cut: with long album lengths the grooves can hold less bass information."

== Reception ==
The Festival Hall concert itself had been received enthusiastically by the Osaka audience. "I had no idea what [they] were going to do", Henderson recalled. "They gave us a standing ovation that was almost as long as the concert." The music translated poorly to the commercial marketplace, however, as Agharta was ill-suited for "FM airplay, dancing, or passive listening", in Nicholson's words. The LP's only appearance on a popular music chart was in April 1976 on the American Billboard chart, where it spent five weeks and reached a peak position of 168.

=== Critical reviews ===
Agharta was also largely unsuccessful with professional critics. According to Robert Christgau, it proved the most widely panned of Davis' double albums in the 1970s. The Stranger's Dave Segal claims it was one of the most divisive records ever, challenging both critics and the artist's core audience much in the same way Lou Reed's Metal Machine Music album had in 1975.

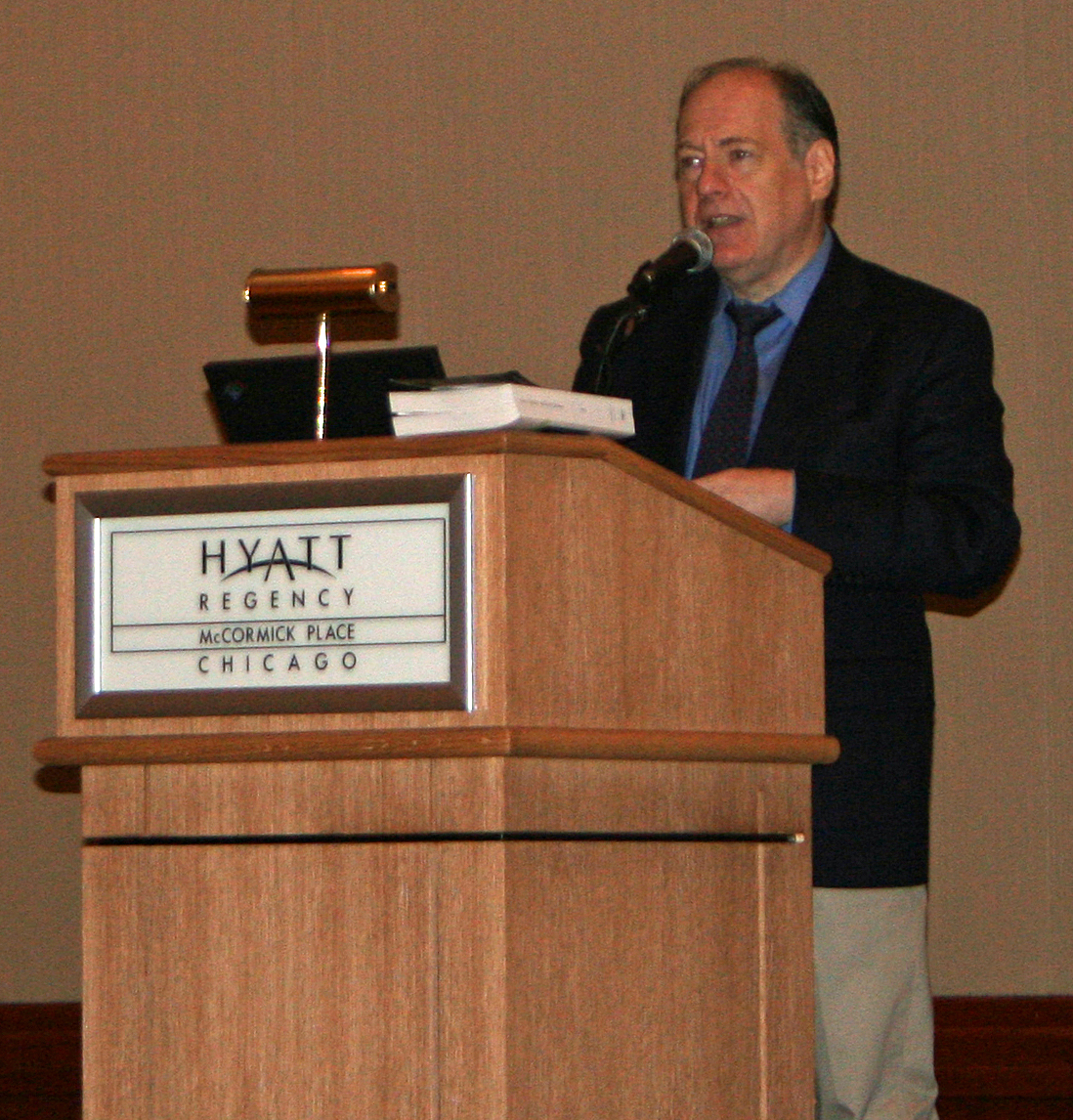
Gary Giddins (2009), one of several jazz critics who originally disliked the album, though he later warmed to it

Reviewing for The New York Times in April 1976, Robert Palmer said Agharta is marred by long stretches of "sloppy, one-chord jams", disjointed sounds, and a banal quality clearly rendered by the impeccable Japanese engineering. He complained that Davis' use of the wah-wah pedal inhibits his ability to phrase notes and that the septet sounds poor "by rock standards", particularly Cosey, whose overamplified guitar "whines and rumbles like a noisy machine shop" and relegates Lucas to background riffs. Jazz Forum reviewer Andrzej Trzaskowski wrote that Fortune seems to be the only jazz musician on the record, finding his solos often flawless, while disparaging the performances of Davis, Lucas, and Cosey, whose guitar and synthesizer effects he found pointlessly brutal. In Trzaskowski's opinion, the individual segments do not cohere as a whole and are further hampered by the clichéd "rock phraseology" of the guitarists, who he said lack wit, harmony, and taste.

Jazz critic Ian Carr thought the album "suffers from a monotony of sound" that he attributed mostly to Lucas and Cosey's relentlessly eruptive guitar playing. Alongside the band's intense rhythms, Davis' trumpet sounds fatigued, dejected, and out of place to Carr. In general, he deemed the music "too non-Western in the sense of too much rhythm and not enough structure". Gary Giddins penned an angrily dismissive review of Agharta in The Village Voice, in which he charged Davis with failing to assert his musical presence on what he said is not "just a bad record" but also "a sad one". In Giddins' mind, the trumpeter "doesn't exploit the backbeat, he succumbs to it, and the worst consequence is not the ensuing monotony, which theoretically a soloist could turn to his advantage." A few days after his review was published, he was sent a package full of large cotton swabs, industrial-strength scouring pads, and a card that read, "The next time you review Miles Davis clean out your head."

Agharta received some positive contemporary commentary. Nathan Cobb from The Boston Globe appraised the record favorably in 1976, calling it "a kind of firestorm for the '70s" with a "positively cosmic" rhythmic foundation. In conclusion, he regarded Davis as "the one who leads the others through the unknown waters of electronic jazz rock". In DownBeat, Gilmore said the band sounds best on the breakneck segments opening each of the two discs, where Cosey's ferocious improvisations "achieve a staggering emotional dimension" lacking on the slower passages, which he felt are still redeemed by Davis' elegiac trumpet playing. He rated the album four stars, out of a possible five. Lester Bangs found Agharta too difficult to definitively assess but nonetheless more fascinating than most other music being released at the time. He wrote in Phonograph Record that Davis' new music is the product of his heart's once luminous "emotional capacities" having been shattered by "great, perhaps unbearable suffering". He went on to write:

In Patti Smith's words, his music now to me is "a branch of cold flame," and I think that, crushed as that heart is, the soul beyond it has not been and cannot ever be destroyed. Like Graham Greene's "burnt-out case" (and he was not referring to drugs), perhaps that is all that is left. But in a curious way that almost glows uniquely brighter in its own dark coldness; and that, that which is all that is left, is merely the universe.

== Aftermath and legacy ==
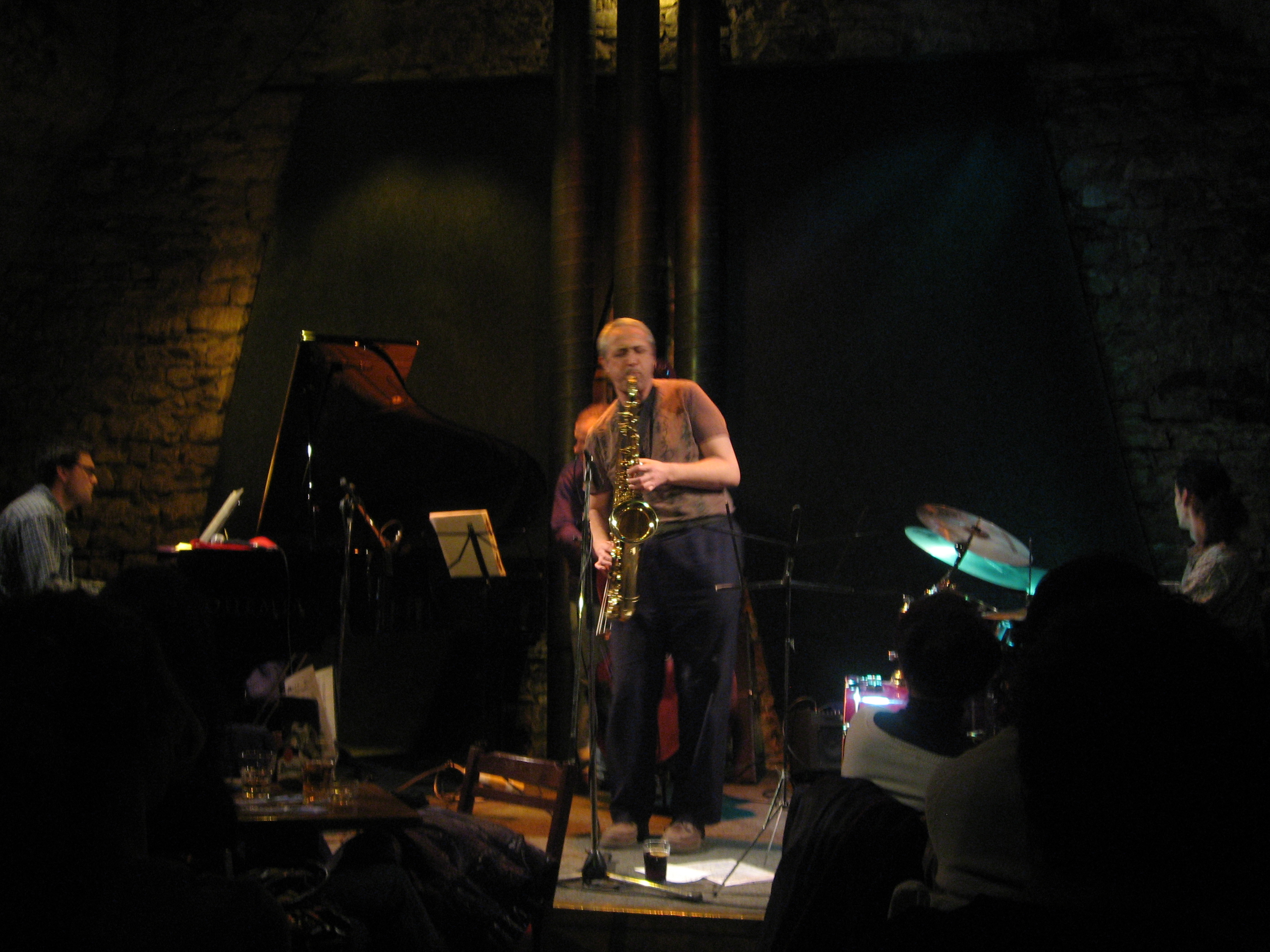
A Czech jazz group at Prague's AghaRTA Jazz Centrum in 2008

By the time of the second Osaka concert (captured on Pangaea), the band's level of energy had diminished significantly, and Davis sounded particularly absent. As Mtume recounted, "he became ill in the evening, and you can hear the difference in the energy." Upon returning from Japan, the trumpeter fell ill again and was hospitalized for three months. He held a few more shows and studio sessions with the band, but his health worsened; their last show on September 5, 1975, in Central Park ended abruptly when Davis left the stage and began to cry in pain.

Davis retired soon after – citing physical, spiritual, and creative exhaustion – and lived as a recluse for the next several years, often struggling with bouts of depression and further medical treatment. After resuming his recording career in 1980, he abandoned the direction he had pursued in the 1970s, instead playing a style of fusion far more melodic and accessible to audiences, until his death in 1991. The day after he died, Prague's Wenceslas Square saw the opening of the AghaRTA Jazz Centrum, a small jazz club named after the album, hosting nightly performances and an annual festival played by local and international acts.

=== Reappraisal ===
Retrospective professional reviews
Review scores
Source	Rating
All Music Guide to Jazz	5/5 stars
Christgau's Record Guide	A
DownBeat	5/5 stars
Encyclopedia of Popular Music	4/5 stars
Hi-Fi News & Record Review	A
MusicHound Jazz	5/5
The Penguin Guide to Jazz	4/4 stars
The Rolling Stone Album Guide	4.5/5 stars
Sputnikmusic	4.5/5
Tom Hull – on the Web	A–

Agharta underwent positive critical reassessment, beginning in 1980 when Davis returned to the jazz scene. Of the albums documenting his 1973–75 band, it was considered by many critics to be the best, in retrospect. For Giddins, it had become one of his favorite albums from the trumpeter's electric period, as he reevaluated its elements of drama, relentless tension, and what he considered the best performances of Fortune and Cosey's careers. "There really is not a moment when the music fails to reflect the ministrations of the sorcerer himself", he later said.

In Christgau's Record Guide: Rock Albums of the Seventies (1981), Christgau saw Agharta as Davis' finest music since Jack Johnson. He called it an "angry, dissociated, funky" record built on the septet's virtuosic performance, particularly Foster's "guileless show of chops" and Fortune's performance, which he deemed the best woodwind playing on a Davis album from this decade. (Note: The US edition of Agharta ranks 12th in Christgau's list of "A"-graded records from 1976, indexed toward the end of the book.) Reflecting on the trumpeter's 1970s concert recordings in The Rolling Stone Album Guide (1992), J. D. Considine contended that Agharta's "alternately audacious, poetic, hypnotic, and abrasive" music had endured the passage of time best. Davis biographer Jack Chambers believed it proved far better than most of his other electric albums, and that the "Maiysha" and "Jack Johnson" segments in particular "magically brought into focus the musical forces over which many thought Davis had lost control".

Although Davis' use of wah-wah was frequently dismissed in the past as a failed experiment, Richard Cook and Brian Morton believed the effects pedal had in fact helped Davis achieve remarkably adventurous playing on Agharta. Cook named it among Davis' best works and the culmination of the music he had begun to explore on Bitches Brew (1970). While possessing an "epic" sound and scope, Agharta is also "a great band record", in his opinion: "Even though Davis contributed only telling details, he still cued exceptional performances from his men." In Tingen's mind, it represents the "high plateau" of Davis' electric explorations. He said that, because Davis gave the band leeway for constant interplay, the music exhibits an "organic and fluid quality" as well as a greater variety of textures, rhythms, timbres, and moods than Dark Magus. Henry Kaiser called it the best ensemble performance of jazz's electric era, and Steve Holtje, writing in MusicHound Jazz (1998), credited Davis with conducting the album's "heroes" to sculpt "moments of shattering beauty and soul-rending vehemence". In the All Music Guide to Jazz (2002), Thom Jurek considered the album inarguably the "greatest electric funk-rock jazz record ever" and declared, "there is simply nothing like Agharta in the canon of recorded music."

=== Influence ===
Back in the mid-1970s, fans who had formed emotional attachments to the moody soundscapes of Filles de Kilimanjaro and In a Silent Way had trouble adjusting to the electronic firestorms of Agharta. While Mr. Davis was being treated for two broken legs and a bone disease, a newer generation of listeners and musicians was inspired by the abrasive music his last band of the 70's had recorded.

— Robert Palmer (1985)

Despite being one of Davis' lesser-known records, Agharta belonged to a period in his career that influenced artists in British jazz, new wave, and punk rock, including guitarists Robert Quine and Tom Verlaine. It inspired a generation of musicians to focus on cathartic playing rather than precise instrumentation and composition. Quine was particularly fascinated by Cosey's electric guitar sounds; Bangs, who attended Quine's performance with the Voidoids in 1977, claimed "he steals from Agharta! And makes it work!"

Writers have since lauded the quality and originality of Cosey's playing on the album, viewing it as a standard for guitar mastery and contrast. Jazz critic Bill Milkowski credited his excursive style for "spawning an entire school of 'sick' guitar playing" and said the combination of Fortune's acerbic sax lines atop Foster, Henderson, and Lucas' syncopated grooves were 10 years ahead of Steve Coleman and Greg Osby's M-Base experiments. Tingen found Cosey's solos amazingly revealing and advanced when heard decades later: "Sometimes growling, scurrying around all corners like a caged tiger, sometimes soaring like a bird, sometimes deliriously abstract, sometimes elegantly melodic and tender, his electric guitar concept is one of the most original to have been devised on the instrument." In Christgau's opinion, the noises he produced on the first track's second half "comprise some of the greatest free improvisations ever heard in a 'jazz'-'rock' context."

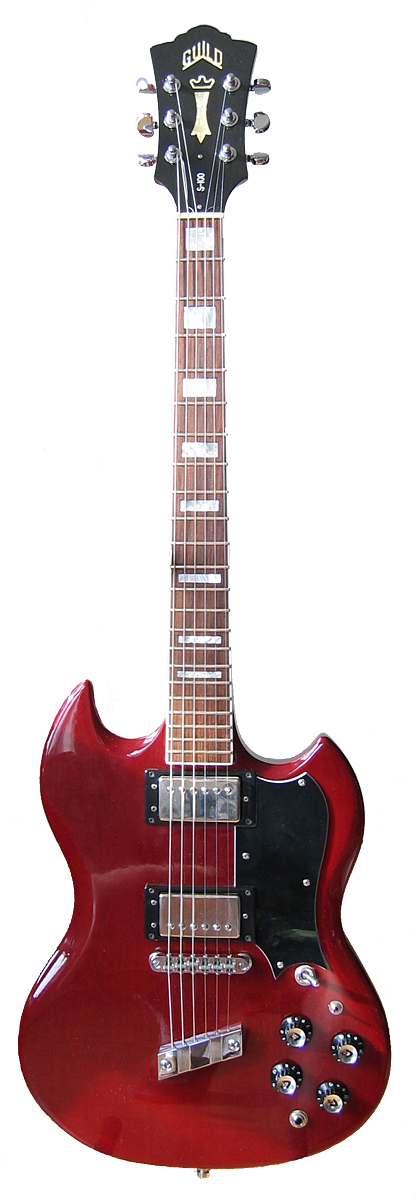
A Guild S-100, played by Pete Cosey on Agharta

According to Nicholson, Agharta and other jazz-rock recordings such as Emergency! (1970) by the Tony Williams Lifetime suggested the genre was progressing toward "a whole new musical language ... a wholly independent genre quite apart from the sound and conventions of anything that had gone before". This development dwindled with the commercialism of jazz in the 1980s, although Agharta remained a pivotal and influential record through the 1990s, especially on artists in the experimental rock genre. It became one of the favorite albums for English musician Richard H. Kirk, who recalled playing it often while working at Chris Watson's loft during their early years in the band Cabaret Voltaire. "I can see how this album might have annoyed people but for me it was really nice grooves with improvisation and would open out and become more minimal", Kirk later told The Quietus. Along with On the Corner, it was also a major influence on the Beastie Boys' 1994 album Ill Communication.

In 1998, composer and bandleader David Sanford completed his dissertation on Agharta as a doctoral student in composition at Princeton University. In it, he argued that the album demonstrated how jazz has utilized a variety of external influences "to evolve or modernize itself". In an interview several years later, Sanford said it was an important work that had gone to the "fringes of jazz" and a place most other music has not explored since. Visual artist Arthur Jafa, among the generation of fans originally attracted to Agharta, later drew on the album as a predominant influence behind his digitally animated film AGHDRA (2021), an abstract meditation on trauma in the African-American experience expressed through visuals of an eruptive sea and a soundtrack recalling Davis' experimental sounds and arrangements. (Note: Jafa was also inspired by Japanese monster films such as Godzilla (1954) and Mothra (1961), particularly in their function of dealing with the trauma following the atomic bombings of Hiroshima and Nagasaki.)

== Track listing ==
Information is taken from the liner notes for each edition.

=== 1975 vinyl LP ===
Record one: Side A
No.	Title	Length
1.	"Prelude (Part 1)"	22:34

Record one: Side B
No.	Title	Length
1.	"Prelude (Part 2)"	—
2.	"Maiysha"	23:01 (Note: This runtime is listed on the LP record for side B as a whole.)

Record two: Side A
No.	Title	Length
1.	"Interlude"	26:17

Record two: Side B
No.	Title	Length
1.	"Theme from Jack Johnson"	25:59

=== 1991 American CD ===
Disc one
No.	Title	Length
1.	"Prelude (Part One)"	22:37
2.	"Prelude (Part Two)"	10:31
3.	"Maiysha"	12:20

Disc two
No.	Title	Length
1.	"Interlude"	26:50
2.	"Theme from Jack Johnson"	25:16

=== 1996 Japanese Master Sound CD ===
Disc one
No.	Title	Length
1.	"Prelude"	32:33
2.	"Maiysha"	13:10

Disc two
No.	Title	Length
1.	"Interlude/Theme from Jack Johnson"	60:48

=== Track notes ===
- All tracks were credited to Miles Davis as the composer.
- According to Paul Tingen, track one of disc one from the Master Sound edition contains the following compositions performed at the noted times: "Tatu" (0:00) and "Agharta Prelude" (22:01); track one of disc two contains "Right Off" (0:00), "So What" (16:42), "Ife" (17:23), and "Wili (= For Dave)" (43:11).
- According to Brian Priestley's discography, appended to Ian Carr's Miles Davis: A Biography (1982), the track titles "Interlude" and "Theme from Jack Johnson" were reversed on the disc label's track listing and liner notes for all editions of Agharta; "Theme from Jack Johnson" was meant to refer to side A, and "Interlude" to side B, of record two.

== Personnel ==
Credits are adapted from the album's liner notes.

Musicians

- Miles Davis – electric trumpet with wah-wah, organ
- Sonny Fortune – alto saxophone, flute, soprano saxophone
- Pete Cosey – electric guitar, percussion, synthesizer
- Reggie Lucas – electric guitar
- Michael Henderson – electric bass
- Al Foster – drums
- James Mtume – congas, percussion, rhythm box, water drum

Production

- Takaaki Amano – assistant engineering
- Mitsuru Kasai – assistant engineering
- Teo Macero – production
- Keiichi Nakamura – album direction
- Tamoo Suzuki – engineering

Packaging

- Shigeo Anzai – photography
- John Berg – artwork (North American release)
- Kiyoshia Koyama – liner notes
- Yoshihiro Kumagai – liner notes
- Tadayuki Naitoh – photography
- Tadanori Yokoo – artwork

== Charts ==
Chart (1976)	Peak position
US Billboard 200	168
American Jazz Albums Chart	16
Italian Jazz Albums Chart	4
Chart (2006)	Peak position
Japanese Albums Chart	243

== See also ==
- 1970s in jazz
- Black Beauty: Miles Davis at Fillmore West
- Miles Ahead (film)

== Bibliography ==
- Acharya, Kiran (2016). "The Death Of Dissent: Richard H Kirk's Baker's Dozen". The Quietus.
- Alexander, Phil (2007). "Miles Davis – Disc of the Day". Mojo. London. Archived from the original on May 22, 2011.
- Alkyer, Frank; Enright, Ed; Koransky, Jason, eds. (2007). The Miles Davis Reader. Hal Leonard Corporation. ISBN 978-1-4234-3076-6.
- Anon. (1975). Agharta (gatefold LP). Miles Davis. CBS/Sony. SOPJ 92–93.
- Anon. (1976). Agharta (gatefold LP). Miles Davis. Columbia Records. PG 33967.
- Anon. (1993). "Davis, Miles". Schwann Spectrum. 4 (4). Chatsworth.
- Anon. (1996). Agharta (Master Sound reissue liner notes). Miles Davis. Sony. SRCS 9128/9.
- Anon. (2006). Time Out Prague (7th ed.). Time Out. ISBN 1-904978-63-0.
- Anon.[a] (n.d.). "Agharta – Miles Davis : Awards". AllMusic. Archived from the original on July 9, 2013.
- Anon.[b] (n.d.). "Miles Davis Agharta Chart History". Billboard.
- Anon.[c] (n.d.). マイルス・デイビスのアルバム売り上げランキング (in Japanese). Oricon. Archived from the original on March 9, 2014.
- Anon.[d] (n.d.). "Agharta Jazz Centrum". Prague-Stay.com. Archived from the original on August 13, 2016.
- Bangs, Lester (1988) [Composed 1977]. "The Clash (1977)". In Marcus, Greil (ed.). Psychotic Reactions and Carburetor Dung (reprint ed.). Vintage Books. ISBN 0-679-72045-6.
- Bangs, Lester (2008) [1st. pub. Phonograph Record: June 1976]. "Kind of Grim: Unraveling the Miles Perplex". In Morthalnd, John (ed.). Main Lines, Blood Feasts, and Bad Taste: A Lester Bangs Reader. Knopf Doubleday Publishing Group. ISBN 978-0-307-48789-6.
- Barton, Chris (2009). "Miles and Miles of Davis in Career Retrospective". Orlando Sentinel. Archived from the original on March 2, 2014.
- Bayles, Martha (May 13, 2001). "Miles Davis: The Chameleon of Cool; an Innovator with Dueling Ambitions". The New York Times.
- Bierman, Bryan (April 19, 2012). "Hidden Gems: Miles Davis' 'Dark Magus'". Magnet. Archived from the original on March 23, 2020.
- Brodowski, Pawel (1982). "Ian Carr: Nuclear Fusion". Jazz Forum. No. 76. Warsaw.
- Buchwald, Dagmar (2012). "Black Sun Underground: The Music of AlieNation". In Berressem, Hanjo; Bucher, Michael; Schwagmeier, Uwe (eds.). Between Science and Fiction: The Hollow Earth as Concept and Conceit. LIT Verlag Munster. ISBN 978-3-643-90228-3.
- Campbell, Hernan M. (2012). "Review: Miles Davis—Agharta". Sputnikmusic.
- Caroli, Daniele (1976). "From the Music Capitals of the World". Billboard. Vol. 88, no. 45.
- Chambers, Jack (1998). Milestones: The Life and Times of Miles Davis. Da Capo Press. ISBN 0-306-80849-8.
- Christgau, Robert (1981). Christgau's Record Guide: Rock Albums of the Seventies. Ticknor & Fields. ISBN 0-89919-025-1.
- Cobb, Nathan (1976). "Sound". The Boston Globe.(subscription required)
- Cole, George (2007). The Last Miles: The Music of Miles Davis, 1980–1991. University of Michigan Press. ISBN 978-0-472-03260-0.
- Cole, George (n.d.). "Pete Cosey: Interviews". TheLastMiles.com. Archived from the original on May 24, 2016.
- Considine, J. D. (1992). "Miles Davis". In DeCurtis, Anthony; Henke, James; George-Warren, Holly (eds.). The Rolling Stone Album Guide (3rd ed.). Random House. ISBN 0-679-73729-4.
- Cook, Richard; Morton, Brian (2006). The Penguin Guide to Jazz (8th ed.). Penguin Books. ISBN 0-14-102327-9.
- Cook, Richard (2007). It's About That Time: Miles Davis On and Off Record. Oxford University Press. ISBN 978-0-19-532266-8.
- Freeman, Philip (2005). Running the Voodoo Down: The Electric Music of Miles Davis. Hal Leonard Corporation. ISBN 1-61774-521-9.
- Giddins, Gary (2006). Natural Selection: Gary Giddins on Comedy, Film, Music, and Books. Oxford University Press. ISBN 0-19-517951-X.
- Gluckin, Tzvi (2015). "Forgotten Heroes: Pete Cosey". Premier Guitar. Archived from the original on July 10, 2016.
- Graham, Stephen (2009). "Miles Electric Bassist Michael Henderson Begins Three-Night Stint at Ronnie Scott's". Jazzwise. London. Archived from the original on December 12, 2013.
- Greenlee, Steve (2007). "Reassessing the Man with the Horn". The Boston Globe. Archived from the original on September 23, 2015.
- Harrison, Max; Thacker, Eric; Nicholson, Stuart (2000). The Essential Jazz Records: Modernism to Postmodernism. A&C Black. ISBN 0-7201-1822-0.
- Hermes, Will (2012). Love Goes to Buildings on Fire: Five Years in New York That Changed Music Forever. Macmillan. ISBN 978-0-374-53354-0.
- Higgins, Jim (2001). "Miles of Electricity". Milwaukee Journal-Sentinel. Archived from the original on December 13, 2013.(subscription required)
- Holtje, Steve; Lee, Nancy Ann, eds. (1998). "Miles Davis". MusicHound Jazz: The Essential Album Guide. Music Sales Corporation. ISBN 0-8256-7253-8.
- Hull, Tom (n.d.). "Grade List: Miles Davis". Tom Hull – on the Web. Archived from the original on April 7, 2022.
- Jeske, Lee (1991). Agharta (CD reissue booklet). Miles Davis. Columbia Records. C2K 46799.
- Jurek, Thom (2002). "Agharta". In Bogdanov, Vladimir; Woodstra, Chris; Erlewine, Stephen Thomas (eds.). All Music Guide to Jazz. Backbeat Books. ISBN 0-87930-717-X.
- Larkin, Colin (2011). "Miles Davis". Encyclopedia of Popular Music (5th ed.). Omnibus Press. ISBN 978-0-85712-595-8.
- Mandel, Howard (2007). Miles, Ornette, Cecil: Jazz Beyond Jazz. Routledge. ISBN 978-0-203-93564-4.
- Milkowski, Bill (2000). "Fusion". In Kirchner, Bill (ed.). The Oxford Companion to Jazz. Oxford University Press. ISBN 0-19-802893-8.
- Milkowski, Bill (2007). "Pete Cosey: Guitar Catharsis". JazzTimes. Quincy. Archived from the original on May 28, 2016.
- Moore, Tom (2010). "An Interview with David Sanford / Tom Moore". 21st-Century Music.
- Murray, Charles Shaar (1991). Crosstown Traffic: Jimi Hendrix & The Post-War Rock 'N' Roll Revolution. Macmillan Publishers. ISBN 0-312-06324-5.
- Nicholson, Stuart (1998). Jazz-rock: A History. Canongate Books. ISBN 0-86241-817-8.
- Reece, Gregory L. (2007). UFO Religion: Inside Flying Saucer Cults and Culture. Bloomsbury Academic. ISBN 9781845114510.
- Reese, Jerome (1987). "Teo Macero". Musician.
- Reynolds, Simon (2011). Bring the Noise: 20 Years of Writing About Hip Rock and Hip Hop. Soft Skull Press. ISBN 978-1-59376-460-9.
- Palmer, Robert (April 4, 1976). "A Jazz Giant Explores Rock". The New York Times.
- Palmer, Robert (1985). "Miles Davis Revives His Bad-Guy Image with a Pop Album". The New York Times. Archived from the original on March 11, 2014.
- Sanford, David (1998). 'Prelude (Part 1)' from Agharta: Modernism and Primitivism in the Fusion Works of Miles Davis (Ph.D.). Princeton University.
- Segal, Dave (2015). "Two of the Most Divisive LPs of All Time—Miles Davis's Agharta and Lou Reed's Metal Machine Music—Are Now 40 Years Old". The Stranger. Seattle. Archived from the original on May 16, 2016.
- Svorinich, Victor (2015). Listen to This: Miles Davis and Bitches Brew. University Press of Mississippi. ISBN 978-1-62674-357-1.
- Szwed, John (2004). So What: The Life of Miles Davis. Simon & Schuster. ISBN 0-684-85983-1.
- Tate, Greg (1992). Flyboy in the Buttermilk: Essays on Contemporary America. Simon & Schuster. ISBN 0-671-72965-9.
- Thorgerson, Storm; Powell, Aubrey (1999). 100 Best Album Covers. DK Publishing. ISBN 0-7894-4951-X.
- Tingen, Paul (1998). "Bill Laswell: Re-shaping the Music of Miles Davis". Sound on Sound. Cambridge. Archived from the original on October 31, 2013.
- Tingen, Paul (2001). Miles Beyond : The Electric Explorations of Miles Davis, 1967–1991 (1st ed.). Billboard Books. ISBN 0-8230-8346-2.
- Tingen, Paul (November 2009). "News". Miles Beyond. Archived from the original on August 28, 2018.
- Trzaskowski, Andrzej (1976). "Agharta". Jazz Forum. No. 40. Warsaw.
- Watson, Ben (December 1993). "Miles Davis Round-Up". Hi-Fi News & Record Review. Vol. 38.
- Wilson, Calvin (2003). "Legendary Trumpeter Was Musical Genius". St. Louis Post-Dispatch. Archived from the original on December 3, 2013.(subscription required)
- Yablonsky, Linda (November 16, 2021). "Arthur Jafa's new film—a post-human slow-motion seascape—defies expectations and honours the Black voice". The Art Newspaper.
