= Going Places =

Going Places or Goin' Places may refer to:

== Music ==
- Going Places (Herb Alpert and the Tijuana Brass album)
- Goin' Places (The Jacksons album)
- Goin' Places (The Kingston Trio album), 1961
- Goin' Places (Michael Henderson album), 1977
- Going Places (Yellow Swans album), 2010
- Going Places, an album by Crabb Revival
- Going Places, an album by Máirtín O'Connor Band, 2011

== Television and film ==
- Going Places, Merv Griffin's mid-1950s television talk show, aired on ABC
- Going Places (American TV series), a 1990 situation comedy aired by ABC
- Going Places (Australian TV series), a 2007 behind-the-scenes look at Jetstar Airways
- "Going Places!" (Barney & Friends), an episode of Barney & Friends
- Going Places (1938 film), a musical comedy starring Dick Powell
- Going Places, a 1973 short TV movie featuring Norman Fell
- Going Places (1974 film), a French comedy-drama
- Going Places (2025 film), a coming-of-age film starring Ethan Cutkosky

== Other uses ==
- Going Places (novel), a 1972 novel by Bertrand Blier
- Going Places (1998), conceptual artwork and hoax by Leeds 13 student art collective
- Going Places (travel agent), a former UK travel agency brand owned by MyTravel Group
