= Eva Bester =

French journalist

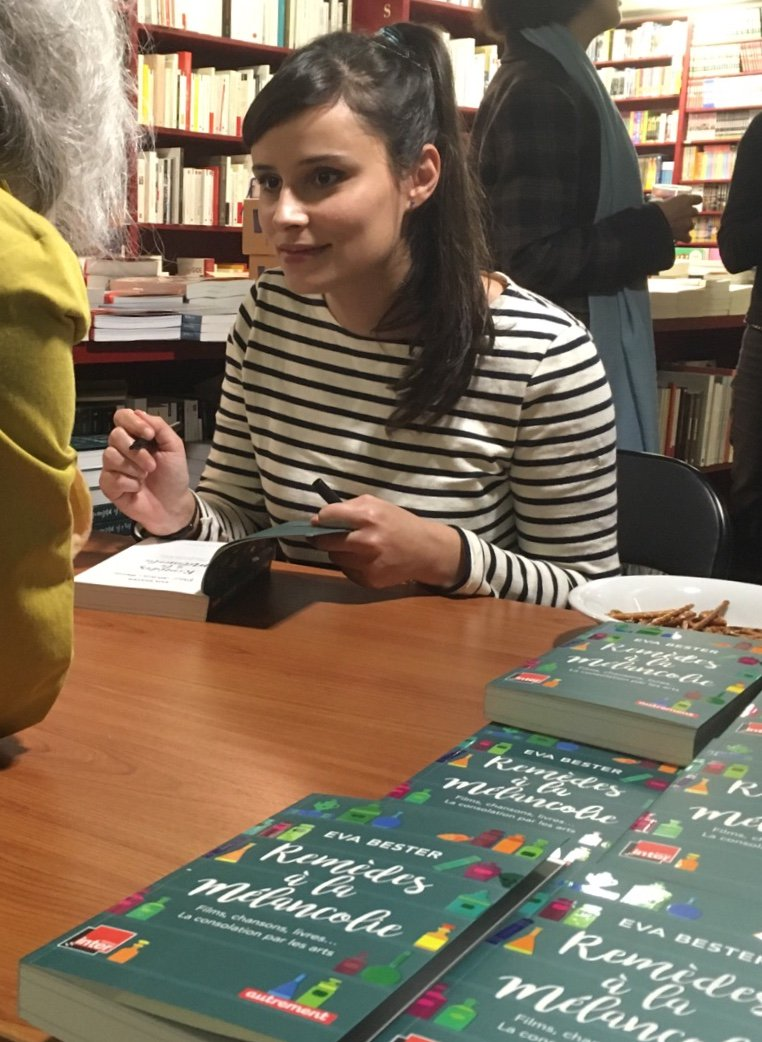
- Born: 25 January 1985 (age 41)
- Occupations: journalist and television presenter

Eva Bester (born 25 January 1985 in Paris) is a French journalist, writer, radio personality and television host.

== Life ==
=== Radio and television ===
Eva Bester, then a student in English, applied for an internship for the program "Chemins de la connaissance" on France Culture. She then worked for the program Concordance des temps.

In 2012 she appeared regularly on the TV show 28 minutes on Arte. In 2013, she participated in the cultural program on France Inter Encore heureux, presented by Arthur Dreyfus.

She produced and hosted the radio show Remède à la mélancolie on France Inter, which aired on Sunday morning, starting in 2013. In 2016, the program had a million and a half listeners on average. In September 2021, the show's title was changed to L'Embellie.

From 2023 to 2023, she hosted the prime-time radio show La 20e Heure, four evenings a week on France Inter. During that time, she interviewed a great number of French and international artists and writers, including Patti Smith, Werner Herzog, Pedro Almodovar, Jonathan Glazer, Juliette Binoche and others. The show ended in 2026.

=== Writing ===
In October 2016, she published at Autrement a book entitled Remèdes à la mélancolie : films, chansons, livres... la consolation par les arts ("Remedies to melancholy: movies, songs, books ... or consolation through the arts"). A new edition of the book appeared in 2018, which included an essay on Belgian painter Léon Spillaert. In 2020, the essay was published separately as Léon Spillaert: oeuvre au noir.

She also co-wrote the novel Fragile des bronches with director Bertrand Blier.

== Works ==
- Bester, Eva (2018). Remèdes à la mélancolie. La consolation par les arts [A cure for melancholy. Consolation through the arts.] (in French). Paris: Autrement. ISBN 9782746747487.
- Bester, Eva (2020). Léon Spilliaert: oeuvre au noir (Ostende 1881-Bruxelles 1946) (in French). Paris: Autrement. ISBN 9782746756403., Paris, Autrement, 2020, 112 p.
- Fragile des bronches, with Bertrand Blier, Éditions Seghers, 2022.
