= Do It All (disambiguation) =

Do It All was a British DIY chain.

Do It All may also refer to:

- Do It All (album), by Michael Henderson
- "Do It All", song by Michael Henderson
- "Do It All", song by Tyga
