= Wide receiver (disambiguation) =

A wide receiver is a position in American football.

it may also refer to:

- Wide Receiver (album), an album by Michael Henderson
  - Wide Receiver (song)
- ATF gunwalking scandal, code named Operation Wide Receiver, a U.S. sting operation
