= Geoffrey Burleson =

American jazz musician

Geoffrey Burleson is an American classical and jazz pianist.

== Biography and career ==
Burleson studied at the Peabody Conservatory, New England Conservatory, and Stony Brook University, and his teachers include Gilbert Kalish, Leonard Shure, Veronica Jochum, Lillian Freundlich, Tinka Knopf and Audrey Bart Brown.

He made his New York City solo recital debut at Merkin Hall in 2000, sponsored by the League of Composers/ISCM. He has performed solo recitals and appeared as featured soloist in Paris (at the Église St-Merri), New York, Rome (American Academy), Helsinki (Sibelius Academy), Athens (Mitropoulos Hall), Mexico City (National Museum of Art), Rotterdam (De Doelen), Chicago (Dame Myra Hess Memorial Series), and elsewhere. He has also appeared as concerto soloist with the Buffalo Philharmonic Orchestra, Boston Musica Viva, New England Philharmonic, Pioneer Valley Symphony, Arlington Philharmonic, Princeton University Orchestra, Hunter Symphony, and the Holland Symfonia in the Netherlands. He has also appeared as soloist in many international festivals, including the Mostly Modern Festival, Bard Music Festival, Monadnock Music Festival, Mänttä Music Festival (Finland), Santander Festival (Spain), the International Keyboard Institute & Festival (New York), and the Interharmony International Music Festival (Italy).

Among his solo recordings are the complete piano works of Camille Saint-Saëns (Naxos Grand Piano) on 6 CDs, the complete piano works of Roy Harris (Naxos), and Vincent Persichetti's 12 piano sonatas (New World Records). Both Volume 5 of Burleson's Saint-Saëns series, and the Roy Harris CD, include several first recordings of unpublished works. Chamber recordings include Odd Couple, a duo CD with Matt Haimovitz including works of Samuel Barber, Elliott Carter, David Sanford, and Augusta Read Thomas (on the Oxingale label); and AKOKA (Pentatone) with a program featuring Messiaen’s Quartet for the End of Time, as well as works by David Krakauer and DJ Socalled, with David Krakauer, clarinet; Matt Haimovitz, cello; and Jonathan Crow, violin.

Burleson is a core member of the American Modern Ensemble, Boston Musica Viva, SWARMIUS, Tribeca New Music, David Sanford’s Pittsburgh Collective, Ensemble Ipse, the IMPetus Trio, and Princeton University's Richardson Chamber Players.

He is currently on the piano and chamber music faculty of Princeton University, and is Professor of Music and Director of Piano Studies at Hunter College.

== Awards and honors ==
Burleson was nominated for a 2015 Juno Award for Classical Album Of The Year for the AKOKA CD. His recordings of Saint-Saëns's complete piano works garnered International Piano Choice Awards from International Piano Magazine, and his CD set of Vincent Persichetti's piano sonatas received a BBC Music Choice award from BBC Music Magazine. He has also received awards from the International Piano Recording Competition (Silver Medal), the Vienna Modern Masters International Performers' Competition, and was the recipient of a DAAD Grant from the German government to support a residency at the Academy of Arts in Berlin.
