= The Jesus Rolls =

2019 film directed by John Turturro

- Official poster
- Directed by: John Turturro
- Screenplay by: John Turturro
- Based on: Going Places by Bertrand Blier The Big Lebowski by Ethan Coen & Joel Coen
- Produced by: Sidney Kimmel; Robert Salerno; Paul-Dominique Vacharasinthu; John Penotti; Fernando Sulichin
- Starring: John Turturro; Bobby Cannavale; Audrey Tautou; Christopher Walken; Jon Hamm; Pete Davidson; Susan Sarandon
- Cinematography: Frederick Elmes
- Edited by: Simona Paggi
- Music by: Émilie Simon
- Production companies: Sidney Kimmel Entertainment; New Element; Tribus P Films
- Distributed by: Screen Media Films
- Release dates: October 16, 2019 (RFF); February 28, 2020 (United States)
- Running time: 85 minutes
- Country: United States
- Language: English
- Budget: $4.5 million
- Box office: $64,648

The Jesus Rolls is a 2019 American crime comedy film written by, directed by, and starring John Turturro. It doubles as a remake of the 1974 French film Going Places by Bertrand Blier and as a sequel to the 1998 cult film The Big Lebowski by the Coen brothers. Turturro reprises his Lebowski role of Jesus Quintana.

It was filmed in 2016 and premiered at the Rome Film Festival on October 16, 2019. It was released on February 28, 2020, by Screen Media Films. It was a box office bomb and received generally negative reviews from critics.

== Plot ==
Jesus Quintana is released from prison and is reminded by the warden that one more strike will get him locked up for good; he is also thanked for winning a bowling tournament for the prison. Jesus's friend Petey picks him up and they go into town, where they steal a classic muscle car and drive to Jesus's mother's house. She is having sex with a man who Quintana kicks out. He gives her some money and they have dinner. When Petey and Quintana return the car to where it was parked, the owner confronts them with a gun. His girlfriend Marie recognizes Quintana. As Petey runs away, the owner shoots him in the testicles, so Quintana beats him up.

Petey, Quintana, and Marie flee in the car and exchange it at a chop shop. Quintana takes Petey to a doctor to get the bullet fragment extracted. After learning it only pierced the scrotum, they rob him. Marie cuts the chop shop mechanic's hair. Petey and Quintana instruct him to damage the muscle car's brakes and structural integrity. The trio then leave in another car.

Stopping at a restaurant, Petey and Quintana flee upon seeing cops. They steal two bicycles and are chased by farmers. Marie leaves the restaurant and is chased for not paying. Petey and Quintana steal another car, drive to train tracks and board a train. Upon disembarking, Marie finds and angrily confronts them for deserting her and the trio board another train.

They find a house where Quintana washes Petey's wound. Petey has sex with Marie while Quintana watches, cheering them on. Marie explains that she has had sex with thousands of people. When they break into Paul's beauty salon and steal money, Marie attacks them. They tie her up and leave her there. The pair go bowling, where Quintana dances with a woman.

The pair pick up recently released inmate Jean from a woman's prison, and they take her to buy clothes. At a restaurant on the beach, Jean talks to the owner about her menstrual cycle. They next go to a motel and Petey and Quintana have sex with Jean, who then commits suicide. They flee and go back to the house where Marie is waiting.

Jean's son, Jack, is getting out of prison the next day, so Petey and Quintana pick him up. The three go to a cabin in the woods where Marie is waiting, and have breakfast. Jack has sex with Marie while Quintana and Petey go fishing.

Jacks shoots and robs a corrections officer he knows while the others flee. They steal another car and leave the city. At a gas station, Petey and Quintana read in a newspaper that they are wanted for shooting the officer. They steal a smart car and eventually pull over for Marie to pee by a lake. At the side of the road is a muscle car that belongs to people boating there.

Quintana, Petey, and Marie steal the car, leaving the smart car behind. The muscle car's brakes jam and they crash, after which they realize it was Paul's car from earlier with a new paint and body job, so they hitchhike.

== Cast ==
- John Turturro as Jesus Quintana
- Bobby Cannavale as Petey
- Audrey Tautou as Marie
- Pete Davidson as Jack Bersome
- Jon Hamm as Paul Dominique
- Susan Sarandon as Jean Bersome
- Sônia Braga as Mother
- Christopher Walken as the Warden
- J. B. Smoove as the Mechanic
- Tim Blake Nelson as Doctor
- Gloria Reuben as Lady Owner
- Michael Badalucco as 99 cent store Security Guard
- Nicolas Reyes and Tonino Baliardo as themselves

== Production ==
The Coen brothers, who wrote, directed, and produced The Big Lebowski, stated on several occasions that they would never make a Lebowski sequel. However, John Turturro expressed keen interest in reprising his role as Jesus at least since 2002. Most of the development of the Jesus character came from Turturro as an actor, which led the Coens to give him a bigger place in the film. In 2014, Turturro announced that he had requested permission from the Coens to use the character.

In August 2016, it was announced that Turturro had been granted the right to use the character of Jesus by the Coens (who were not involved in the production), and had already started filming the spin-off, which he wrote and directed. Filming locations included New York City and Los Angeles. The film was a remake of the 1974 French film Going Places directed by Bertrand Blier, which was based on Blier's own novel Going Places. The working titles were 100 Minutes with Jesus and then Going Places. The film was completed in 2017 and with its acquisition by Screen Media Films, the title was changed to The Jesus Rolls.

The film was produced by Sidney Kimmel, John Penotti, Fernando Sulichin, Paul-Dominique Vacharsinthu, and Robert Salerno.

== Release ==
Its world premiere was at the Rome Film Festival on October 16, 2019. It was theatrically released in Italy on October 17, 2019, and in the United States on February 28, 2020, by Screen Media Films.

== Reception ==
On Rotten Tomatoes, the film has an approval rating of 20%, based on 46 reviews, with an average rating of 4.1/10. The website's critics consensus reads: "The Jesus Rolls limply into the gutter in its misguided attempt to belatedly explore the saga of a supporting character better left on the margins." On Metacritic, the film has a weighted average score of 44 out of 100, based on reviews from 13 critics, indicating "mixed or average reviews".

Deborah Young of The Hollywood Reporter wrote: "Though Turturro turned this small part into a memorable character for the Coens, Quintana is not so reliably funny here, especially headlining a whole film of very intermittent charm." Peter Debruge of Variety wrote: "In the end, the project doesn't really work. The Coen brothers have a touch for the absurd, and a gift for dialogue, that's lacking here, and without those two qualities, Jesus wears out his welcome relatively early in the journey."
