= Going Places (1974 film) =

- Film poster
- Les Valseuses
- Directed by: Bertrand Blier
- Screenplay by: Bertrand Blier; Philippe Dumarçay
- Based on: Going Places; 1972 novel by Bertrand Blier
- Produced by: Paul Claudon
- Starring: Gérard Depardieu; Miou-Miou; Patrick Dewaere
- Cinematography: Bruno Nuytten
- Edited by: Kenout Peltier
- Music by: Stéphane Grappelli
- Distributed by: SN Prodis
- Release date: 20 March 1974
- Running time: 113 minutes
- Country: France
- Language: French
- Box office: $42.9 million

Going Places is a 1974 French comedy-drama film co-written and directed by Bertrand Blier, and based on his own novel with the same title. Its original title is Les Valseuses, which translates into English as "the waltzers", a vulgar French slang term for "the testicles". It stars Miou-Miou, Gérard Depardieu and Patrick Dewaere, who all had their breakthrough roles with this film.

It is one of the most controversial films in French cinema due to its vulgarity, depiction of sexual acts, nudity and amorality. However, later acclaim for the rest of Blier's filmography made it a cult film for modern critics.

== Plot ==
Jean-Claude and Pierrot harass and sexually assault an older woman in a banlieue, steal her purse and run away. After they evade their pursuers, they loot the purse but are disappointed to find almost no money. They steal a Citroën DS for a joyride. When they bring it back at night, the owner awaits them with his gun drawn. Pierrot runs away but is shot in the groin. Jean-Claude overpowers the owner, stealing the gun and the car and also kidnapping Marie-Ange, the woman the owner was with. After Jean-Claude picks up Pierrot, they drive to a car mechanic they know to exchange the stolen DS for another car, offering the mechanic the chance to rape Marie-Ange. Leaving with the other car, Jean-Claude and Pierrot force a doctor at gunpoint to treat Pierrot's wounds, which are only superficial. They steal the doctor's money and flee.

When they come back to the mechanic, he is angry that Marie-Ange was totally passive and apathetic during the rape. Pierrot fears that he has become impotent because of his wounds and suggests sabotaging the steering of the DS before giving it back to the owner, imagining him having an accident on a winding road. They go through with the plan and let Marie-Ange go, but not before getting her address.

Jean-Claude and Pierrot go to the country, stealing bicycles and a car from locals. When they have to stop at a train crossing and see police arriving, they flee their car and enter the almost empty train. They encounter a young woman who is breastfeeding her child and force her to let Pierrot suckle on her breasts. This leads to all three making out, before the woman notices that she has to leave the train at the station, where her husband is waiting. Pierrot complains that he was not able to get an erection.

After encountering police on the train station, Jean-Claude and Pierrot decide to lie low and go to a deserted coastal resort, where they break into a vacation home to stay there. They notice that the home belongs to a family of three, with a daughter named Jacqueline. After finding Jacqueline's bathing suit, they smell it gleefully and estimate that she must be around 16 years old.

They return to Marie-Ange and force her to have sex with both of them. Pierrot is this time able to get an erection. She again is totally passive, frustrating both. She tells them that the car owner has sold his sabotaged DS.

With the help of Marie-Ange, they break into the hair salon she works at. When she requests to be kissed and begins screaming and throwing things, they shoot her in the leg and leave her bound to a chair in the salon.

When their plan of seducing young women fails, Jean-Claude suggests that an inmate in a women's prison would be sexually starving. They wait at the entrance of a prison and see Jeanne be released. They follow her and suggest helping her, which confuses Jeanne, who refuses several times before giving in. While they are arguing at a roadside, Jean-Claude scares away a driver with his gun, which amuses Jeanne. Jean-Claude hands her his gun, saying that she can trust them. They give her money to buy some clothes, bring her to the beach and have a lavish oyster dinner with her. On the car ride, Jeanne passionately kisses both. All three check into a hotel and have passionate sex. When Jean-Claude and Pierrot are sleeping, Jeanne commits suicide by shooting herself in the groin. Jean-Claude and Pierrot take the gun and Jeanne's belongings and flee the hotel.

When going through her belongings, they notice through her correspondence that she has a son named Jacques, who is also in jail. When he is released several weeks later, Jean-Claude and Pierrot tell him that Jeanne asked them to help him because she is in Portugal. They bring him to a cottage where Marie-Ange is waiting and suggest that he should have sex with her. They are upset when they hear Marie-Ange seemingly reaching orgasm. Afterwards, she explains that it was the timidity and awkwardness of the virgin Jacques which aroused her.

Later, Jacques suggests robbing an elderly person and asks for their gun to do it. Jean-Claude and Pierrot accompany him. Jacques rings at a house, which turns out to belong to one of his prison's wardens, who welcomes them, before seeing the gun Jacques is pointing at his head. Jacques shoots the warden, and Jean-Claude and Pierrot flee with Marie-Ange. After stealing another car, Marie-Ange has sex with each of them while driving, now seemingly enjoying it very much.

After Jean-Claude and Pierrot learn that they are wanted for murder, they want to leave Marie-Ange so that she is not connected to this crime, but she refuses. So the three continue on the road, stealing cars and trying to hitch-hike. When they encounter a family in the countryside, they force them to exchange their old stolen Citroën Traction Avant against the family's new DS, identical to the sabotaged one. The daughter of the family is amused by the situation and suggests their parents accept the deal. When she is hit by her father she breaks down and begs the three to take her with them, which they do. When they find out that she is still a virgin, they deflower her, apparently not without her consent. They note that her name is Jacqueline and when they smell her vagina they are sure that this is the Jacqueline whose bathing suit they found in the vacation home. Later, they drop her off on the roadside, and continue on.

== Cast ==
- Gérard Depardieu as Jean-Claude
- Miou-Miou as Marie-Ange
- Patrick Dewaere as Pierrot
- Brigitte Fossey as the woman on the train
- Dominique Davray as Ursula / Suzanne
- Isabelle Huppert as Jacqueline
- Jacques Rispal as watchman
- Jeanne Moreau as Jeanne Pirolle
- Sylvie Joly as lady who gets her car stolen
- Gérard Jugnot as man who gets his car stolen
- Thierry Lhermitte as doorman
- Christian Alers as Henri, Jacqueline's father
- Michel Peyrelon as Bruno, the surgeon
- Gérard Boucaron as Carnot, the mechanic
- Jacques Chailleux as Jacques Pirolle
- Eva Damien as Bruno's wife
- Marco Perrin as supermarket manager
- Claude Vergnes as Merlan, the hairdresser
- Michel Pilorgé as man on motorcycle

== Production ==
Bertrand Blier based the screenplay on his own novel Going Places, which had been published by éditions Robert Laffont in 1972. The film was produced by CAPAC, UPF and Prodis. Principal photography took place from 16 August to 24 October 1973. Locations were used in Valence, Drôme.

Blier had initially wanted to cast comedian Coluche as Jean-Claude, and was reluctant to cast Depardieu. But Depardieu, who felt that the character's background strongly resembled his own, pestered Blier for weeks until he won the role.

For the scene where the character played by Brigitte Fossey gets her breasts sucked by Patrick Dewaere, the actress, who slipped into this role, "was not frightened", but Bertrand Blier still remembers a moment when the actress got a little scared, because she "had a little dizziness when she was caught between the two guys, one who sucked her and the other titillating her from behind."

== Release ==
The film premiered in France on 20 March 1974. It was released in the United States on 13 May the same year and the United Kingdom on 23 October 1975. The film had a total of 5,726,031 admissions in France where it was the third highest-grossing film of the year.

== Reception ==
In 1974, Roger Ebert of the Chicago Sun-Times wrote: "Despite its occasional charm, its several amusing moments and the touching scenes played by Jeanne Moreau, Going Places is a film of truly cynical decadence. It's also, not incidentally, the most misogynistic movie I can remember; its hatred of women is palpable and embarrassing. [...] I came away from Going Places feeling that I'd spent two hours in the company of a filmmaker I would never want to meet."

Pauline Kael, on the other hand, writing in The New Yorker, said that "Going Places was perhaps the first film from Europe since Breathless and Weekend and Last Tango in Paris to speak to us in a new, first hand way about sex and sex fantasies; it did it in a terse, cool, assured style...with a dreamy sort of displacement" Kael describes it as an "explosively funny erotic farce, both a celebration and a satire of men's daydreams" and mentions that "it's easy to find it upsetting and degrading. But that's part of what makes it funny."

In 1990, when the film was re-released in Los Angeles cinemas, Kevin Thomas of the Los Angeles Times wrote: "Blier has gone on to a notable and distinctive career, but as worthy (and quirky) as his subsequent films have been, none have packed the punch of his debut film, which he based on his own novel. [...] The road/buddy movie was scarcely new 16 years ago, but Blier's strategies in the telling of his sexual odyssey remain fresh, outrageous and inspired." Thomas continued: "Jean-Claude is the precursor of all the earthy, passionate men Depardieu has brought to life on the screen. What's more, Blier is interested more in Jean-Claude and Pierrot as sexual chauvinists than as petty criminals, and as they learn to be more considerate lovers they become more likable. Above all, they embody the sure-fire appeal of all movie anti-heroes, free spirits who live entirely for the moment and at all times follow their impulse."

On review aggregator website Rotten Tomatoes, the film holds an approval rating of 71% based on 14 reviews, with an average rating of 6.4/10.

== See also ==
- The Jesus Rolls (2020), an English-language remake directed, written by and starring John Turturro, which also acts as a spin-off to the cult comedy film The Big Lebowski.
