= Sylvester Rivers =

American music producer and composer

- Born: October 28, 1953 (age 72); Detroit, Michigan, United States
- Occupations: Composer, arranger, producer, pianist
- Instrument: Piano
- Years active: c. 1960–present
- Website: www.sylvesterrivers.com

Sylvester Rivers (born October 28, 1953) is an American composer, arranger, pianist and producer, based in Los Angeles, California. A prolific session musician, he has recorded with numerous major artists including Aretha Franklin, Nancy Wilson, Johnny Mathis, Lionel Richie, Diana Ross, Smokey Robinson, The Temptations, Kenny Rogers, Village People, Deniece Williams, Ray Parker Jr., Marc Bolan, Shalamar, New Edition, Billy Preston, The Sylvers, Earl Klugh, Maxine Nightingale, Gloria Gaynor, The 5th Dimension and many others. He arranged many chart hits including the Number 1 Billboard Hot Soul Single, Candi Staton's, "Young Hearts Run Free."

== Early life ==
Born in Detroit, Michigan and a Cass Tech graduate, Sylvester Rivers began playing the piano at the age of seven and was recording professionally by the time he was a teenager. In the early days, he played for Holland-Dozier-Holland's Invictus Records and Hot Wax Records labels, which included artists such as the Honey Cone, Freda Payne, The Chairmen of the Board, 100 Proof (Aged in Soul), and the 8th Day and played on hits such as the Honey Cone's million-selling Billboard Number 1 Pop and Number 1 R&B single, "Want Ads."

== Career ==
After arriving in Los Angeles in 1974, Rivers began playing piano on recording sessions for an even wider range of artists, from Stanley Turrentine to Johnny Mathis. Rivers also worked often with the famous arranger, Gene Page. At this point, Rivers began to focus more on arranging and orchestrating. He arranged and orchestrated for numerous artists, including Nancy Wilson and scored his first Number 1 Billboard Hot Soul Single and top twenty Billboard Hot 100 single with Candi Staton's, "Young Hearts Run Free" and later scored again with her hit single, "Victim." He quickly followed with a top twelve Billboard Hot 100 single hit, High Inergy's, "You Can't Turn Me Off (In the Middle of Turning Me On)"." Soon thereafter, he received his first composer's credit for a Gold record, the title cut of the Michael Henderson album, "In the Night Time." Rivers arranged and orchestrated for the film soundtrack album, "Breakin' 2: Electric Boogaloo," and many others. He continued recording with major artists in the studio, working with Kenny Rogers on the Billboard Number 1 Country and Multi-Platinum album, "Share Your Love" bearing the Billboard Number 1 Adult Contemporary single, "Through the Years," and the Billboard Number 1 Country and Number 1 Adult Contemporary single, "I Don't Need You," with Lionel Richie and Diana Ross on the Gold album, "Endless Love" soundtrack and the Multi-Platinum New Edition album, "New Edition," bearing the Billboard Number 1 R&B single, "Mr. Telephone Man," among others.

Rivers toured as music director with artists including Ray Parker Jr., ("Ghostbusters"), with whom he also recorded, and he conducted the world tour of Soul II Soul ("Back to Life (However Do You Want Me)"). Rivers is a board member of ASMAC (American Society of Music Arrangers and Composers).
