= Slingshot (album) =

Studio album by Michael Henderson
- Released: July 11, 1981
- Recorded: 1981
- Genre: Soul; funk
- Length: 36:06
- Label: Buddah
- Producer: Michael Henderson; Chuck Jackson

Michael Henderson chronology
Wide Receiver (1980)	Slingshot (1981)	Fickle (1983)

Professional ratings
Review scores
Source	Rating
AllMusic	4/5 stars
MusicHound R&B: The Essential Album Guide	3/5 stars

Slingshot is the sixth album by American bass guitarist Michael Henderson, released in 1981 by Buddah Records.

== Track listing ==
1. "Slingshot" 4:20
2. "Never Gonna Give You Up" 4:12
3. "Can't We Fall in Love Again" - (Duet With Phyllis Hyman) 3:42
4. "Take Care" 6:34
5. "Make It Easy On Yourself" 3:51
6. "(We Are Here To) Geek You Up" 6:30
7. "In It For The Goodies" 3:33
8. "Come To Me" 3:36

== Personnel ==
- Michael Henderson - vocals, bass, background vocals
- David Miles, Dennis Briggs, Mario Resto, Mitch Holder, Ralph Armstrong, Tim May - guitar
- Nathan East - bass
- Lester Williams, Louis Resto, Michael D. Caylor, Mike Lang, Ted Harris, John Barnes, Michael Boddicker - keyboards
- Darryl Jennings, Leon "Ndugu" Chancler, Richard Allen - drums
- Alan Estes, Carl "Butch" Small, Chuck Jackson, Tony Coleman - percussion
- Dusty, Dwayne Harris, Venna Keith - background vocals
- Johnny Trudell and the Detroit Horns - horns
- Carl Austin Strings - strings
- David Van DePitte - horn and string arrangements

== Charts ==
Chart (1981)	Peak position
US Top LPs (Billboard)	86
US Top Soul LPs (Billboard)	14
US Top Jazz LPs (Billboard)	27

=== Singles ===
Year	Single	Chart positions
Year	Single	US R&B
1981	"Can't We Fall In Love Again"	9
1981	"(We Are Here To) Geek You Up"	51
1982	"Make It Easy On Yourself"	68
