= Wide Receiver (song) =

1980 song by Michael Henderson

Single by Michael Henderson

from the album Wide Receiver
- Released: 1980
- Genre: funk, dance
- Length: 8:03
- Label: Buddah
- Songwriters: Michael Henderson; Randall Jacobs

"Wide Receiver" is a 1980 funk/dance song by North American bass guitarist and vocalist Michael Henderson. The song was written by Henderson, along with Randall Jacobs, and was the title track from the album of the same name.

== Song theme and background ==
The song contains innuendos in the form of American football references. It also has references to marijuana ("The referee must have been smokin a joint"). Sounds from the handheld game Mattel Electronic Football were used in the introduction and background of the song. The phrase "sometimes you feel like a nut, sometimes you don't" from Mounds and Almond Joy advertising were also used in the lyrics. The phrase "Baseball's been very, very good to me on the song fade was a popular saying from Garrett Morris' Chico Escuela character portrayed on Saturday Night Live at the time. Henderson is mainly known for a style of smooth R&B heard on the quiet storm radio format; this song was his only club dance track. Ironically, it became his biggest hit. Another song from the album was "Prove It" which charted at number 27.

== Chart performance ==
In the US, "Wide Receiver was a hit, peaking at #4 on the Hot Soul Singles chart. On the Disco Top 100 chart it peaked at #42
