= In the Night Time =

Studio album by Michael Henderson
- Released: 1978
- Recorded: 1978
- Studio: Sigma Sound, Philadelphia, Pennsylvania
- Genre: Soul; funk
- Length: 41:41
- Label: Buddah Records
- Producer: Michael Henderson

Michael Henderson chronology
Goin' Places (1977)	In the Night Time (1978)	Do It All (1979)

Professional ratings
Review scores
Source	Rating
AllMusic	3/5 stars

In the Night Time is the third album by American bass guitarist Michael Henderson. It was released in 1978 by Buddah Records.

== Track listing ==
All tracks composed by Michael Henderson; except where indicated

1. "Take Me I'm Yours" 4:20
2. "We Can Go On" 6:17
3. "Happy" 6:04
4. "In the Night-Time" (Michael Henderson, Sylvester Rivers) 4:55
5. "Whisper In My Ear" (Jerry Jones) 7:11
6. "Am I Special" (Michael Henderson, Rudy Robinson) 4:11
7. "Yours Truly, Indiscreetly" (Lamont Johnson, Randall Jacobs) 3:45
8. "One To One" (Herman Curry, Jr.) 4:58

== Personnel ==
- Michael Henderson – lead and backing vocals, bass, handclaps, guitar, keyboards
- Ray Parker Jr., Randall Jacobs – guitar
- Herman Curry Jr. – bass, handclaps
- Jerry Jones, Keith Benson – drums
- Mark Johnson, Rod Lumpkin – organ, clavinet
- Rudy Robinson, Gary Crista – keyboards, synthesizer
- Keith Benson, Lorenzo "Bag of Tricks" Brown – percussion
- Eli Fontaine – saxophone
- Evan Solot – trumpet
- Cheryl Norton, Rena Scott – vocals
- Barbara Ingram, Evette Benton, Carla L. Benson – backing vocals

== Charts ==
Chart (1978)	Peak position
US Top LPs (Billboard)	38
US Top Soul LPs (Billboard)	5
US Top Jazz LPs (Billboard)	6

=== Singles ===
Year	Single	Chart positions	
Year	Single	US	US R&B
1978	"In the Night-Time"	—	15
1978	"Take Me I'm Yours"	88	3
