= Guild S-100 =

Electric guitar

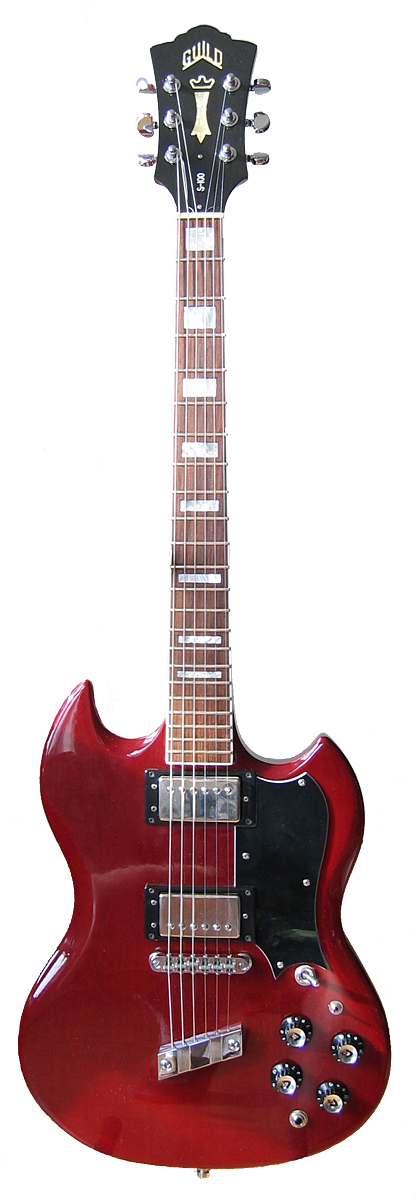
- Manufacturer: Guild Guitar Company
- Period: 1965–1999 (United States); 2013–2023 (South Korea); 2023-present (Indonesia)

Construction
- Body type: Solid
- Neck joint: Set

Woods
- Body: Mahogany
- Neck: Mahogany

The Guild S-100 electric guitar is a lightweight solid-body guitar made by the Guild Guitar Company. It features two humbucking pickups and its body is styled similarly to a Gibson SG, but is slightly offset. In the 1970s, a version of this guitar was available from the factory with leaves and acorns carved in relief into the body of the guitar.

Players of the Guild S-100 have included Pete Cosey (on the 1975 Miles Davis album Agharta), Carrie Brownstein of Wild Flag and Sleater-Kinney, Tim Kinsella of Joan of Arc, Chris McCaughan of The Lawrence Arms, Kim Thayil of Soundgarden, Stephen Malkmus of Pavement, Bobb Trimble, Alec Stephen of Railroad Jerk and Ian Hunter of Mott the Hoople.
