= Wide Receiver (album) =

Studio album by Michael Henderson
- Released: 1980
- Recorded: 1980
- Studio: Sigma Sound, Philadelphia, Pennsylvania; United Sound, Detroit, Michigan; Sound Suite, Detroit, Michigan; Record Plant, Los Angeles, California; Allan Zentz Recording, Los Angeles, California
- Genre: Soul; funk
- Length: 39:08
- Label: Buddah
- Producer: Michael Henderson

Michael Henderson chronology
| Do It All (1979) | Wide Receiver (1980) | Slingshot (1981) |

Professional ratings
Review scores
| Source | Rating |
|---|---|
| Allmusic | 4.5/5 stars |

Wide Receiver is the fifth album by American bass guitarist Michael Henderson. It was released in 1980 by Buddah Records.

== Track listing ==
All tracks composed by Michael Henderson; except where indicated

1. "You're My Choice" 3:03
2. "Make Me Feel Like" 4:27
3. "Reach Out For Me" (Hal David, Burt Bacharach) 3:35
4. "Wide Receiver" (Michael Henderson, Randall Jacobs) 8:05
5. "I Don't Need Nobody Else" (Lou Courtney) 4:01
6. "What I'm Feeling (For You)" (Michael Henderson) 4:03
7. "Ask The Lonely" (George Hunter, William Stevenson) 3:10
8. "There's No One Like You" (Randall Jacobs) 4:19
9. "Prove It" 4:25

== Personnel ==
- Michael Henderson - lead and backing vocals, bass, crowd voices
- Randall Jacobs - guitar, piano, handclaps, crowd voices
- Bobby Franklin, Cory Heath, Erik Wallace, Ollie E. Brown, Ron Pangborn - drums
- Ray Parker Jr. - rhythm guitar
- Ernestro Wilson, Gary Nester, Manon "Zoo" Saulsby - keyboards
- Cory Heath, Lorenzo "Bag Of Tricks" Brown, Miguel Fuentes - percussion
- Michael Iacopelli - synthesizer
- Sylvester Rivers - acoustic piano
- Eli Fontaine - saxophone
- Evan Solot - trumpet
- Little Sonny - harmonica
- Cory Heath, Duane Harris, Gary Nester, Marvin White, Pamela Brown - crowd voices
- Carol Hall, Cheryl Norton, Jeanette McGruder, Kathy Kosins, Roz Ryan, Sheila Horne, Venna Keith - backing vocals

== Charts ==
| Chart (1980) | Peak position |
|---|---|
| US Billboard Top LPs | 35 |
| US Billboard Top Soul LPs | 6 |

=== Singles ===
| Year | Single | Chart positions | |
| Year | Single | US R&B | US Dance |
|---|---|---|---|
| 1980 | "Wide Receiver" | 4 | 42 |
| 1980 | "Prove It" | 27 | — |
| 1981 | "Reach Out For Me" | 78 | — |
