= Solid (Michael Henderson album) =

Studio album by Michael Henderson
- Released: 1976
- Recorded: 1976
- Studio: United Sound Studios, Detroit, Michigan
- Genre: Soul; funk
- Label: Buddah Records
- Producer: Michael Henderson

Michael Henderson chronology
Solid (1976)	Goin' Places (1977)

Professional ratings
Review scores
Source	Rating
AllMusic	3/5 stars
MusicHound R&B: The Essential Album Guide	2.5/5 stars

Solid is the debut album by the American bass guitarist Michael Henderson, released in 1976 on Buddah Records.

== Track listing ==
All tracks composed by Michael Henderson

1. "Make Me Feel Better" 3:00
2. "Time" 3:11
3. "Let Love Enter" 2:54
4. "Treat Me Like a Man" 4:02
5. "Solid" 6:34
6. "Be My Girl" 5:07
7. "You Haven't Made It to the Top" 4:04
8. "Valentine Love" 3:57
9. "Stay with Me This Summer" 3:42

== Personnel ==
- Michael Henderson - lead and backing vocals, bass guitar, guitar, drums on "Solid"
- Bruce Nazarian - guitar, synthesizer
- Jerry Jones, Leslie Daniels - drums
- Lester Williams, Nimrod Lumpkin, Rudy Robinson - keyboards
- Ralph Armstrong - guitar
- Mark Johnson - synthesizer
- Muruga Sharma aka Muruga Booker - percussion
- Eli Fontaine, Marcus Belgrave, Norma Jean Bell - horns
- Rudy Robinson, Travis Biggs - strings
- Brandye, Rose Henderson Williams - backing vocals

== Charts ==
Chart (1977)	Peak position
Billboard Pop Albums	173
Billboard Top Soul Albums	10
Billboard Top Jazz Albums	20

=== Singles ===
Year	Single	Chart positions
Year	Single	US R&B
1977	"Be My Girl "	23
1977	"You Haven't Made It to the Top"	80
