= Martha Bayles =

American writer

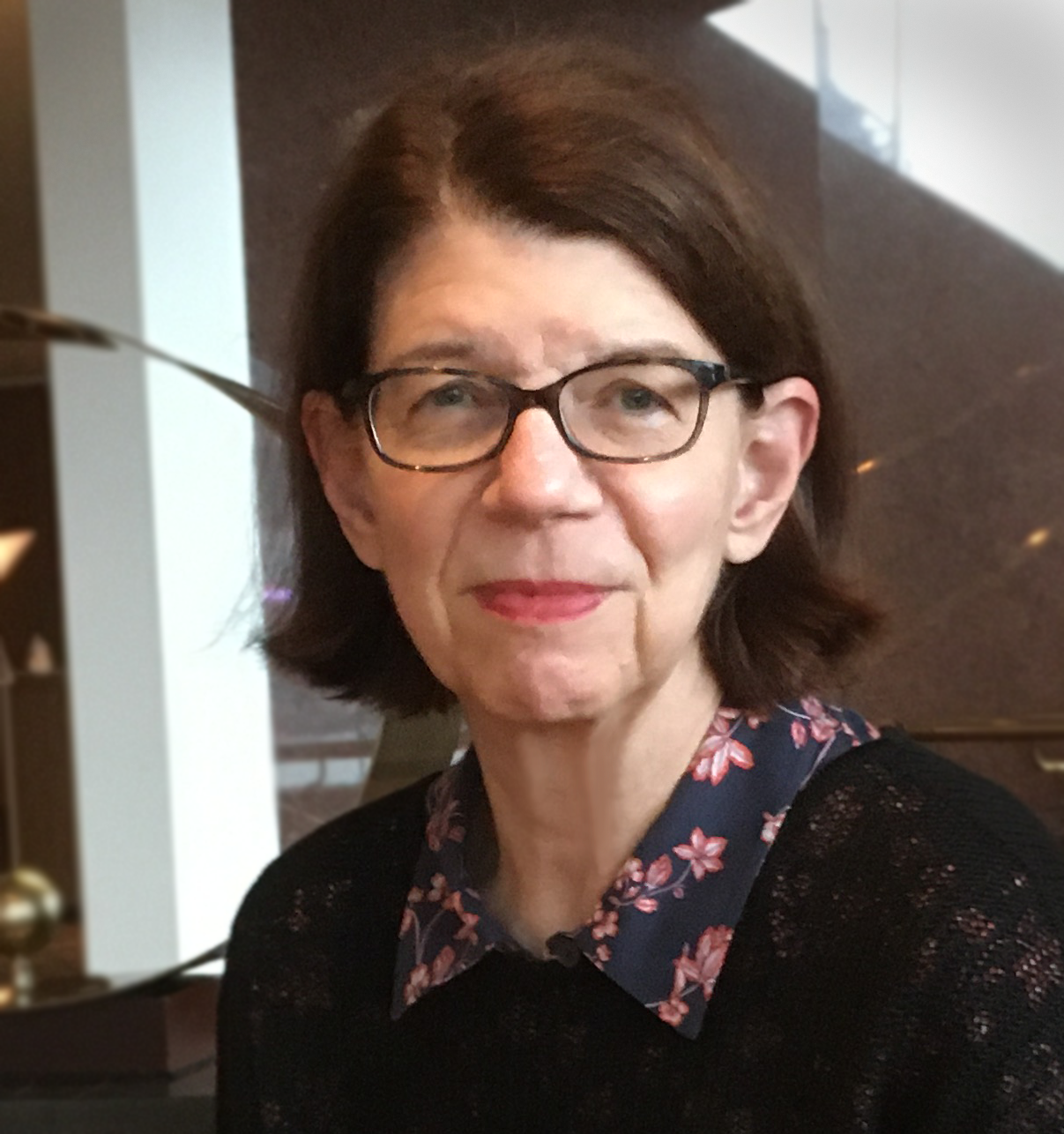
- Martha Bayles in January 2020
- Born: 1948 (age 77–78); Boston, Massachusetts, U.S.
- Education: Harvard University (B.A.) University of Pennsylvania (M. Ed.)
- Occupations: Writer, Professor, Critic
- Notable work: Hole In Our Soul: The Loss of Beauty and Meaning in American Popular Music (1994); Through a Screen Darkly: Popular Culture, Public Diplomacy, and America's Image Abroad (2014)
- Spouse: Peter Skerry
- Website: http://www.marthabayles.com/

Martha Bayles (born 1948) is an American critic, author, and college professor. Her work focuses on the arts, popular media, cultural policy, and U.S. public diplomacy. She has written for publications such as the Wall Street Journal, the Boston Globe, the Claremont Review of Books, and the Weekly Standard. Bayles' published books include Hole in Our Soul: The Loss of Beauty and Meaning in American Popular Music in 1994, and Through a Screen Darkly: Popular Culture, Public Diplomacy, and America's Image Abroad in 2014. She has formerly taught at Harvard University and Claremont McKenna College, and is currently a professor of humanities at Boston College.

== Life and career ==
Martha Bayles graduated from Harvard with a Bachelor of Arts in art history, and later graduated from the University of Pennsylvania with a Masters of Education. She taught at several public schools in Philadelphia, as well as in Boston and Cambridge, MA. Between 1997 and 2003, she taught humanities at Claremont McKenna College, with a short period in 2002 as a member of visiting faculty to Colorado College. In 2003, she began teaching humanities and the western cultural tradition at Boston College as a part of the Arts & Sciences Honors Program. After the end of the program in 2018, she remained at the college as a lecturer.

As a writer and lecturer, Bayles has focused on American culture and media, as well as United States public diplomacy. She has worked as a writer for the Wall Street Journal and as an editor at Wilson Quarterly. She has also contributed articles to the Claremont Review of Books, The Atlantic, and the National Review. Bayles has spoken at events both in the US and abroad; within the US, locations include the Institute for Advanced Studies in Culture at the University of Virginia and the American Enterprise Institute. Outside of the US, she has given two speaking tours in Germany for the U.S. Embassy, one tour in Poland as a part of the Fulbright Specialist program, and held several individual events outside of the US.

Bayles is the wife of the political scientist Peter Skerry.

== Reviews and reception ==
=== For Hole in Our Soul ===
Hole in Our Soul’s released in 1994 to controversial reception. Reviewers tended to praise her writing and her recounting of the cultural history of American music, while criticizing her theoretical analysis. Daniel J. Silver from Commentary writes that “... despite some theoretical shakiness, [Hole in Our Soul] is a spirited and enlightening book... [Bayles] provides an entertaining cultural history, full of many flashes of offbeat insight”. Similarly, Jonathon S. Epstein from American Music writes that “The book is a captivating text, despite its sometimes less than rigorous handling of complex, multifaceted issues, and it should spark considerable debate among readers”. Several reviewers disliked some of the focus on music critics within her analyses. Jazz musician Sonny Rollins praised the work, writing that it is "[a]n illuminating look at where American culture is today, and how it got there".

Focus within reviews was also placed on Bayles’ discussion on the root of American music in African-American styles. Robert Tate of Jazz Now wrote that her theory was an oversimplification of history, as well as “the old natural rhythm theory tricked out as modern political correctitude”. In contrast, Hal Crowther wrote in the Journal-Constitution observed that “Bayles’s indictments of popular music for misogyny, racism and infantile sexuality are among the book’s best arguments. And the torch she’s carrying is for black and black-influenced music”. Stanley Crouch wrote that Bayles "[understood] well the defeatist techniques that would-be radical pop entertainers inherit from misbegotten fine art".

=== For Through a Screen Darkly ===
Through a Screen Darkly was well-received by critics. Sam Schulman of the Weekly Standard writes that “Bayles’s genius here is not just in dissecting the pathology of the pop-culture mind, but in revealing its effects on the world at large—in matters of war, peace, freedom, and human relations”. Sonny Bunch from Commentary notes that “It’s hard to think of a political constituency that won’t be annoyed with Bayles…” but that “… there is something to please every side as well”. Sarah Ruden of Books & Culture was more mixed in her review, writing that “though my reservations about Through a Screen Darkly range from the slums of Cape Town to my checking balance at the credit union down the road, I still commend the book for its useful overview and many astute points”. American diplomat R. Nicholas Burns praised how Bayles' work "demonstrates how critical it is that our government return to vigorous public diplomacy to showcase the best of America," while Francis Fukuyama described the book as "a lively but sobering read for anyone concerned with America's place in the world”.

Toby Miller, in his review of the book for The Chronicle of Higher Education, was almost entirely negative on Bayles’ work. He comments that “Bayles has labored long and hard on her analysis, but it amounts to a fleshing out of the simplistic hypothesis she was clearly wedded to from the start.” He also states that Bayles, in her research, did not engage with serious analysts of media and culture. One month after Miller’s review, Bayles wrote a letter to The Chronicle as a response to the article, arguing that he simplified the opinions of the people featured in the book, and ignored several scholars she had referenced: "[Miller] pays no attention to any of the people I interviewed -- especially when they had something good to say about America."

== Media ==
Bayles has appeared on multiple television and radio programs to discuss her work on public diplomacy, mostly in the 2013-2015 period. These appearances include several on PBS programs, C-SPAN, NPR., and the "Dennis Prager Show".

== Awards and honors ==
Bayles has been awarded numerous honors from a variety of cultural, academic, and national institutions, including:

- Arthur L. Andrews Award for Fiction, Cornell University (1976)
- American Academy of Poets Honorable Mention, Cornell University (1976)
- American Academy of Poets Award, Syracuse University (1975)
- Joan Grey Untermeyer Award for Poetry, Radcliffe College (1969, 1970)
- American Academy of Poets Honorable Mention, Harvard University (1969)

== Bibliography ==
=== Authored books ===
- Hole in Our Soul: The Loss of Beauty and Meaning in American Popular Music. University of Chicago Press, 1996. ISBN 0-226-03959-5
- Through a Screen Darkly: Popular Culture, Public Diplomacy, and America's Image Abroad. Yale University Press, 2014. ISBN 978-0-300-12338-8

=== Book chapters ===
- "Popular Culture," in Understanding America: The Anatomy of An Exceptional Nation, edited by Peter H. Schuck and James Q. Wilson (Public Affairs, 2008). ISBN 978-1-58648-695-2
- "Exporting the Wrong Picture," in International Relations (Longman, 2006). ISBN 978-0-321-43430-2
- "None So Deaf: Toward a New Pedagogy of Popular Music," in Bridging the Gap: Popular Music and Music Education, edited by Carlos Rodriquez (National Association for Music Education, 2004). ISBN 978-1-56545-158-2
- "We Are All Sopranos," in Annual Editions: Race and Ethnic Relations (McGraw Hill, 2004).
- "Miles Davis and the Double Audience," in Miles Davis and American Culture, edited by Gerald Early (Missouri Historical Society, 2001). ISBN 978-1-883982-38-6

=== Articles ===
The Claremont Review of Books, American Interest, and National Review provide lists of published articles written by Martha Bayles on their websites (see External links). Other articles written by Bayles include:

- "Why I Didn't Sign," Discourse Magazine (June 13, 2025)
- "Piled High With Difficulty," Discourse Magazine (April 4, 2025)
- "'How to Win an Information War' Review: Deception on the Airwaves," Wall Street Journal (March 8, 2024)
- "'Plato Goes to China' Review: When Ancients Serve Ideologues," Wall Street Journal (February 26, 2023)
- "'Cold War Radio' Review: Listen and You Shall Hear," Wall Street Journal (October 23, 2022)
- "'The Socratic Method' Review: Let Us Reason Together," Wall Street Journal (June 24, 2022)
- "'Rescuing Socrates' Review: Great Books, Greatly Missed," Wall Street Journal (November 7, 2021)
- "Bowe Bergdahl,'Homeland,' and the Kindness of Strangers," Boston Globe (June 15, 2014)
- "Subdued by the Tube," Boston Globe (January 20, 2013)
- "Paint By Numbers: New Deal Art and the Problems of Public Patronage," Weekly Standard (November 16, 2009)
- "Woodstock: Both a Dream and a Nightmare," Wall Street Journal (August 14, 2009)
- “The Legacy of Michael Jackson,” Radio Free Europe/Radio Liberty website (June 27, 2009).
- "An American Education, Closer to Home," Wall Street Journal (August 1, 2008)
- “The Art of Global Public Relations,” Wall Street Journal (July 24, 2008)
- "How the People's Republic Does PR," Wall Street Journal (June 28, 2007)
- "Public Diplomacy, TV-Style," Wall Street Journal (February 16, 2007)
- “The Angel of Diversity,” [memoir], Antioch Review (Fall 2006)
- “Innocents Abroad,” Wall Street Journal (May 5, 2006)
- "Some of Rap’s Fathers Start Taking Responsibility," Wall Street Journal (July 6, 2005)
- "Attacks on Rap Now Come from Within," Wall Street Journal (April 28, 2005)
- "Rock's Bad Boy Pose Is Getting Old," Wall Street Journal (November 13, 1997)
- "Will the Real Elvis Please Stand Up?" Wall Street Journal (August 15, 1997)
