= Do It All (album) =

Studio album by Michael Henderson
- Released: 1979
- Recorded: 1979
- Studio: Sigma Sound, Philadelphia, Pennsylvania; United Sound, Detroit, Michigan
- Genre: Soul; funk
- Label: Buddah
- Producer: Michael Henderson

Michael Henderson chronology
In the Night Time (1978)	Do It All (1979)	Wide Receiver (1980)

Professional ratings
Review scores
Source	Rating
AllMusic	2.5/5 stars

Do It All is the fourth album by American bass guitarist Michael Henderson, released in 1979 on Buddah Records.

== Track listing ==
All tracks composed by Michael Henderson; except where indicated

1. "Playing On the Real Thing" 4:18
2. "Everybody Wants to Know Why" (Herman Curry, Jr) 3:13
3. "To Be Loved" (Berry Gordy, Tyran Carlo) 4:44
4. "Do It All" 5:17
5. "In the Summertime" (Michael Henderson, Randall K. Jacobs) 4:09
6. "Wait Until the Rain" 7:19
7. "Riding" 5:21

== Personnel ==
- Michael Henderson – lead and backing vocals, bass
- Randall Jacobs – guitar
- Bobby Franklin, Cory Heath, Keith Benson, Ollie E. Brown – drums
- Rudy Robinson, David Lee – keyboards, synthesizer
- Anthony Jones, Jimmy Williams – percussion
- D.J. Vassal Benford – clavinet
- Eli Fontaine – saxophone
- Evan Solot – trumpet
- Little Sonny – harmonica
- Barbara Ingram, Yvette Benton, Paula Benson – backing vocals

== Charts ==
Chart (1979)	Peak position
Billboard Top LPs	64
Billboard Top Soul LPs	17

=== Singles ===
Year	Single	Chart positions
Year	Single	US R&B
1979	"Do It All"	56
1979	"To Be Loved"	62
