= Fragile des bronches =

2022 novel by Bertrand Blier

- Author: Bertrand Blier
- Language: French
- Publisher: Éditions Seghers
- Publication date: 27 January 2022
- Publication place: France
- Pages: 184
- ISBN: 978-2-232-14519-3

Fragile des bronches (lit. 'Fragile Bronchi') is a 2022 autobiographical novel by the French writer Bertrand Blier. Set in 1956, it is about the 16-year-old son of an actor father and a depressed mother. It is closely based on scenes from Blier's own adolescence and his relationship with his father Bernard Blier.

Jérôme Garcin of L'Obs wrote that Blier's sense of absurdity comes to its right in the novel, as opposed to in his film Heavy Duty (2019), and described the book's sensibility as somewhere between Samuel Beckett and Michel Audiard.
