= Going Places (novel) =

1972 novel by Bertrand Blier

- Author: Bertrand Blier
- Original title: Les Valseuses
- Translator: Patsy Southgate
- Language: French
- Publisher: Éditions Robert Laffont
- Publication date: 1972
- Publication place: France
- English publication date: 1974
- Pages: 420
- ISBN: 2221049659

Going Places (French: Les Valseuses) is a 1972 novel by the French writer Bertrand Blier. It is about the young men Jean‐Claude and Pierrot from Toulouse who go on a spree of petty crime, sex and careless opportunism. It was published in English translation by Patsy Southgate in 1974. Kirkus Reviews compared the main characters to characters from Louis-Ferdinand Céline's novels and the film Jules and Jim, calling Going Places "an offbeat, unforgettable novel".

Blier directed his own film adaptation of the novel, Going Places from 1974. This film was remade by John Turturro as The Jesus Rolls from 2019, in which Turturro also reprises his role from the American film The Big Lebowski.
