= Goin' Places (Michael Henderson album) =

Studio album by Michael Henderson
- Released: 1977
- Recorded: 1977
- Studio: Electric Lady Studios, New York City, New York
- Genre: Soul; funk
- Length: 35:32
- Label: Buddah
- Producer: Michael Henderson

Michael Henderson chronology
Solid (1976)	Goin' Places (1977)	In the Night Time (1978)

Professional ratings
Review scores
Source	Rating
AllMusic	4.5/5 stars

Goin' Places is the second album by American bass guitarist Michael Henderson. It was released in 1977 by Buddah Records.

== Track listing ==
All tracks composed by Michael Henderson; except where indicated

1. "Whip It" 4:01
2. "Goin' Places" 4:08
3. "Let Me Love You" (Michael Henderson, Ray Parker Jr.) 5:00
4. "I Can't Help It" 4:16
5. "I'll Be Understanding" (Michael Henderson, Rudy Robinson) 3:03
6. "At The Concert" Duet w/ Roberta Flack 7:16
7. "Won't You Be Mine" (Ken Peterson) 7:00

== Personnel ==
- Michael Henderson - lead and backing vocals, bass, bongos, guitar, keyboards
- Herbie Hancock - Fender Rhodes
- Ray Parker Jr., Randall Jacobs - guitar
- Jerry Jones - drums
- Mark Johnson - Fender Rhodes, hand-clapping, synthesizer
- Rudy Robinson - ARP strings, hand-clapping, Clavinet, Fender Rhodes, guitar, piano
- Ollie E. Brown, Lorenzo Brown - percussion
- Eli Fontaine, Marcus Belgrave, Norma Jean Bell - horns
- Ralph Moss - horns, strings
- Rod Lumpkin - organ
- Eli Fontaine - soprano saxophone
- Steve Hunter - trombone
- Barbara Shelley, Wesley Gullick - hand-clapping
- Gwen Guthrie, Yolanda McCullough, Brenda White - backing vocals
- Roberta Flack - co-lead vocals on "At the Concert"

== Charts ==
Chart (1977)	Peak position
US Top LPs (Billboard)	49
US Top Soul LPs (Billboard)	18
US Top Jazz LPs (Billboard)	11

=== Singles ===
Year	Single	Chart positions
Year	Single	US R&B
1977	"I Can't Help It "	27
1977	"Won't You Be Mine"	82
