= Tzvi Gluckin =

American author, speaker, and musician (born 1968)

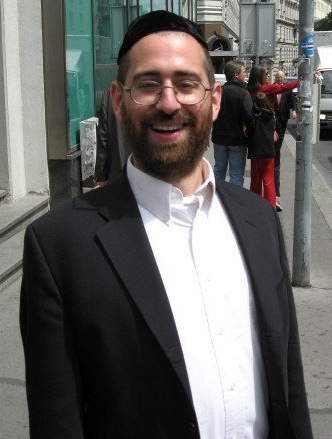
- Born: 1968 (age 57–58)
- Occupations: Author; speaker; musician

Tzvi Gluckin (born 1968) is an American author, speaker, and musician. He lectures regularly on college campuses in the United States, Israel, and Canada. He has written four books on different topics including spirituality, music, and campus recruitment. He currently serves as the director of Vechulai, a Jewish think tank based in Boston, Massachusetts.

In 2009 he began lecturing in various online forums including JOU Max, an online Jewish program for college students, Totally Online, an online Hebrew School for children, and The Ultimate Online Jewish Course, a course for college students provided by Aish Boston.

== Biography ==
Gluckin grew up in Randolph, New Jersey. He started playing the guitar at age thirteen and after high school attended the New England Conservatory of Music in Boston. He graduated with a Bachelor of Music in 1990 and moved to Brooklyn, NY. In New York, he played and toured with a number of blues-based rock bands and experimental jazz ensembles. He also taught guitar lessons and worked a number of odd jobs including ticket sales for the New York Philharmonic.

In 1993 he left New York to travel Europe and moved to Israel at the conclusion of his travels. He attended the yeshiva Aish HaTorah and received his rabbinical ordination from its founder Rabbi Noah Weinberg. In 2000 he served in the Israeli Army. In 2001 he moved to Boston, Massachusetts and started Aish Campus, a college-based Jewish outreach organization. He left Aish Campus in 2009 to found Vechulai.

== Books ==
Gluckin has written four books.

- Knee Deep in the Funk: Understanding the Connection Between Spirituality and Music. Mekabel Press. 2011. ISBN 978-0-9845856-1-8.
- Discover This. Mekabel Press. 2010. ISBN 978-0-9845856-4-9.
- Everything You Want Is Really Jewish. Mekabel Press. 2009. ISBN 978-0-9845856-3-2.
- The Glue Factor: The Sticky Secret of Campus Recruiting. Mekabel Press. 2009. ISBN 978-0-9717229-9-6.

His articles were included in a collection of articles that originally appeared on the website Aish.com

- Heaven on Earth: Down to earth Jewish spirituality. Targum Press. 2002. ISBN 1-56871-206-5.

== Music ==
While in college, Gluckin was a member of the punk trio Fat Elvis and joined the fledgling free jazz/free metal group the Mellow Edwards. He composed a series of pieces for operatic soprano, alto saxophone, and rock trio, which received moderate airplay on Boston radio. He performed in ensembles and master groups led by such jazz notables as George Russell and Cecil Taylor. He was also a member of the group the Sweet Lizard Illtet. After moving to New York he continued to perform with the Mellow Edwards and was a founding member of the blues trio the Blues Posse. He stopped playing music professionally during his years in Israel, but returned in 2006 with the release of Jewish Roots Music, a CD of original acoustic Jewish music.

Original recordings:

- (MiMi), CD/Digital release 2013
- Jewish Roots Music, CD 2006

Recordings of his compositions:

- Santander University Fest, music recorded by Impetus, CD 2011
- Sweet Lizard Illtet, Warner Brothers Records, CD 1992
