= Jazz in Czechoslovakia =

Czechoslovakia's jazz roots were established by Jaroslav Ježek and Rudolf Antonín Dvorský in the 1920s and 1930s. Ježek's influence in this realm is particularly noted and by the time he immigrated to the United States in 1939, his compositions blending jazz and classical music were among the most popular music. After the invasion of Czechoslovakia by the Nazis, however, jazz was banned and it was not until 1947 when the Australian jazz pianist Graeme Bell and his Dixieland Jazz Band performed at a World Youth Festival in Prague that the jazz movement was revived.

When this movement began, the Stalinists were opposed to it, but as Josef Škvorecký writes in his The Bass Saxophone, “Its name was Dixieland. A type of the cannibal-music with roots so patently folkloristic and often (the blues) so downright proletarian that even the most Orwellian falsifier of facts would be hard put to deny them”. Similar to the situation during World War II, jazz was developed by Africans and as such, regarded as trash. As this movement grew, it became increasingly intertwined with the growth of the dissident movement.

Among the underground intellectuals, jazz was the genre that was most identified with. As the cultural scene in Czechoslovakia heated up, the jazz scene expanded along with it. In 1964, the First Prague International Jazz Festival was held, bringing hip bands of the time. When the Prague Spring occurred, jazz continued its success as an independent form that attracted the youth in all their rebellion. It was the music that was played at clubs and numerous individual bands formed. As one sees in Škvorecký's The Cowards, the day revolved around practicing jazz with the group and heroic daydreams. Even though the novel is set at the end of WWII, the books publishing in 1958 is clearly demonstrative of the excitement for jazz that is present at the time Škvorecký writes the novel.

== Jazz Section of the Czech Musician's Union ==
The small victories that jazz won during this time, however, are not comparable to the Jazz Section of the Czech Musician's Union that was created in 1971. Formed through an “administrative loophole,” a group of jazz musicians saw the opportunity to become part of the union, and despite jazz being seen as “trash music” for the underclasses, was accepted. The Ministry of the Interior issued a number of guidelines, most importantly that the section was limited to a membership of 3,000. For the first couple of years after its conception, the Jazz Section kept within the confines of the laws. It began the Prague Jazz Days festival, which was expected to be a yearly event. It published a bulletin that discussed the ongoing music scene. As the section grew, the heads of the section became bolder and launched a book series that discussed all popular culture at the time — from Czech art, to rock poetry, a dictionary of American rock bands, to the 1984 Nobel Prize acceptance speech by Jaroslav Seifert. The first problem or law that it transgressed was the size constraint. By the time the Section was shut down, membership had reached up to 7,000 — 4,000 more than was allowed. Membership was also breached in other ways. The bulletin and book series that the section published spread quickly from hand to hand. Škvorecký writes “If in a high school one student belonged to the Jazz Section, the books and periodicals he was allowed to buy were read by practically the whole student body and usually also by the teaching staff.” As the Section's popularity grew and their ability to sponsor musical events became more limited, it reached beyond jazz, and even beyond music in general to literature and art. They began to publish volumes of samizdat, or communist suppressed literature. Publications that were sold only to members in cultural organizations were subject to less censorship and in this way, the Section published numerous manuscripts on “alternative culture” and escaped punishment by the government.

== Tensions between Jazz Section and communist government ==
The government's approval of the Jazz Section was in part due to its intense dislike of rock music and the overwhelming popularity of that genre. As the rock movement began to become involved with the jazz scene, tensions erupted. At the fifth Jazz Days festival, the authorities got involved when a “rock operetta” was allowed to be performed. From then on until 1984 when the Section was shut down, the bureaucracy resorted to tactics of harassment. After the Jazz Section applied for membership in the European Jazz Federation, a member of the United Nations Educational, Scientific and Cultural Organization, in the early 80's, the communist government feared bad publicity and could not shut down the section immediately. In 1980, the Jazz Days festival was cancelled under the pretext that 15,000 fans had bought tickets and the event could be listed as a “public disturbance.” In 1983, the bureaucrats sought to pressure the Czech Musician's Union to dissolve the Jazz section. When this was refused, however, the government dissolved the entire organization.

The heads, Karel Srp and Vladimír Kouřil, continued to run the Section even after its disbandment causing them to be jailed in 1986. This action was met with severe criticism from abroad including authors such as Kurt Vonnegut and John Updike. Beyond Srp and Kouřil, five other members were arrested and given fairly light sentences. Though the real causes for the light sentences are unknown, Škvorecký speculates “you cannot really hold such things in Czechoslovakia when Gorbachev is in Moscow releasing Andrei Sakharov and other people. So the trial was really a compromise between the hard-liners in the Czechoslovak party leadership who wanted to make it a warning to anyone who dared to do something not fully endorsed by the party, on the one hand, and the opportunists who smell a new wind from Moscow, on the other, who were against the trial. It reflects a split in the ruling party.” These sentiments are similar to the ideas present at the end of WWII when everybody had their own rescued Jew to prove that they were good beings. Not to be undone by these arrests however, the Jazz Section continued while Srp was in prison.
