= David Sanford (composer) =

American composer (born 1963)

- Born: David William Sanford; 1963 (age 62–63); Pittsburgh, Pennsylvania, United States
- Genres: Jazz
- Occupations: Composer, bandleader
- Instrument: Trombone

David William Sanford (born 1963 Pittsburgh, Pennsylvania) is an American composer who is also a jazz bandleader.

== Biography ==
Sanford was born in Pittsburgh, Pennsylvania in 1963, into a musical family. His parents and one of his grandfathers were choir leaders, his other grandfather was a jazz trumpeter, and his great-grandmother Mozie Bass had composed songs, and music for church pageants; he also has a brother who is a music teacher and singer in Colorado, where the family moved.

The young David Sanford acquired an enthusiasm for big band music early on, playing trombone from around the age of ten. He went on to major in music at the University of Northern Colorado, and earned master's degrees in theory and composition at the New England Conservatory of Music. In 1991, supported partly by a Guggenheim Fellowship and partly by a job in the financial services industry, he undertook doctoral studies at Princeton, where he completed his dissertation on Miles Davis in 1998. That same year he joined the faculty at Mount Holyoke College, where he teaches theory, composition, and various history courses, including one on music of the 1970s.

In 2002, the Rome Prize took Sanford to Italy for a year, and he formed the Pittsburgh Collective on his return, inviting players from a classical background as well as jazz musicians. The group's debut album (Oxingale OX2010) was recorded live at the Knitting Factory in 2005, with Matt Haimovitz as a cello soloist. Works by Sanford have been performed by the Chamber Society of Lincoln Center, the San Francisco Contemporary Music Players, Chicago Symphony Chamber Players, Detroit Symphony, Corvini e lodice Roma Jazz Ensemble, Meridian Arts Ensemble, and Speculum Musicae. His most recent works are published by Oxingale Music.
