= Michael Henderson =

American bass guitarist and vocalist (1951–2022)

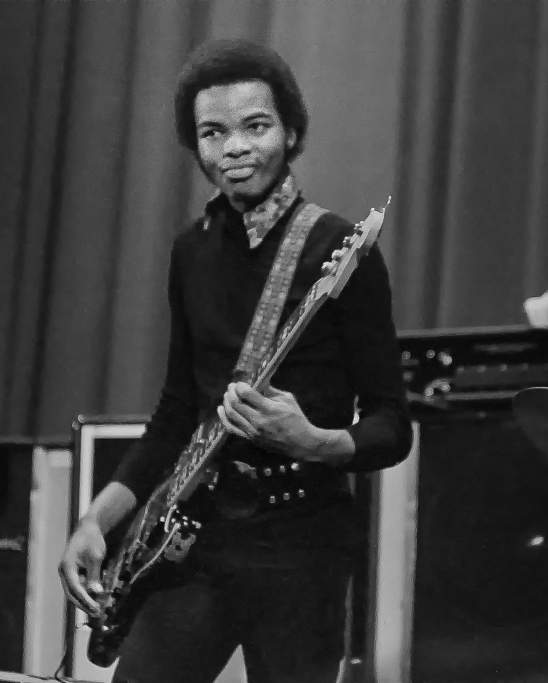
- Performing in 1971

Background information
- Born: Michael Earl Henderson; July 7, 1951; Yazoo City, Mississippi, U.S.
- Died: July 19, 2022 (aged 71) Dallas, Georgia, U.S.
- Genres: R&B, jazz, funk, soul, pop
- Occupation: Musician
- Instruments: Vocals, bass
- Years active: 1970–2022
- Labels: Buddah Records, Arista, EMI-Capitol

Michael Earl Henderson (July 7, 1951 – July 19, 2022) was an American bass guitarist and vocalist. He was known for his work with Miles Davis in the early 1970s on early fusion albums such as Jack Johnson, Live-Evil, and Agharta, along with a series of his own R&B/soul hits and others featuring him on vocals, particularly the Norman Connors-produced hit "You Are My Starship" in 1976 and other songs in the mid to late-1970s.

== Early life ==
Michael Earl Henderson was born on July 7, 1951, in Yazoo City, Mississippi. In the early 1960s he moved to Detroit, playing as a session musician.

== Career ==
Henderson was one of the first notable bass guitarists of the fusion era as well as being one of the most influential jazz and soul musicians of the past 40 years. In addition to Davis, he played and recorded with Marvin Gaye, Aretha Franklin, Stevie Wonder, the Dramatics, among many others.

Before working with Davis, Henderson had been touring with Stevie Wonder, whom he met at the Regal Theater in Chicago while warming up for a gig. Davis saw the young Henderson performing at the Copacabana in New York City in early 1970 and reportedly said to Wonder simply "I'm taking your fucking bassist." After almost seven years with Davis, Henderson focused on songwriting and singing in a solo career that produced many hit songs and albums for Buddah Records until his retirement in 1986. Although known primarily for ballads, he was an influential funk player whose riffs and songs have been widely covered. He is also known for his ballad vocalizing on several Norman Connors hit recordings, including "You Are My Starship" and "Valentine Love", performed with Jean Carne.

== Personal life and death ==
At the time of his death, Henderson was in a relationship with DaMia Satterfield, and separated from his wife, Adelia Thompson. He had three children, and lived in the Atlanta suburb of Dallas, Georgia, where he died from cancer on July 19, 2022, almost two weeks after his 71st birthday.

== Solo discography ==
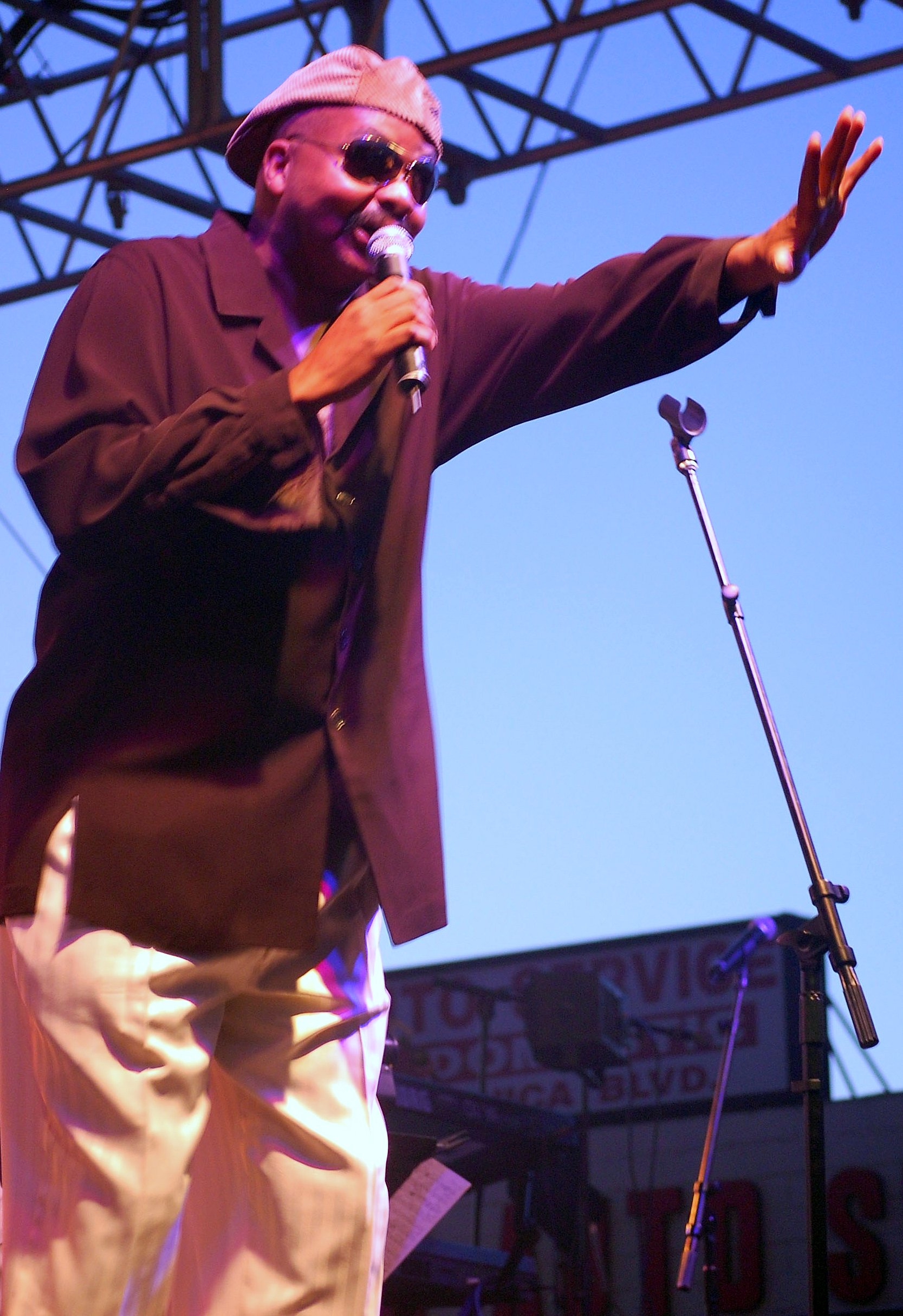
Singing at Sunset Junction Festival in Los Angeles, 2008

=== Studio albums ===
Year	Album	Label	Peak chart positions		
Year	Album	Label	US 200	US R&B	US Jazz
1976	Solid	Buddah Records	173	10	20
1977	Goin' Places	Buddah Records	49	18	11
1978	In the Night Time	Buddah Records	38	5	6
1979	Do It All	Buddah Records	64	17	—
1980	Wide Receiver	Buddah Records	35	6	—
1981	Slingshot	Buddah Records	86	14	27
1983	Fickle	Buddah Records	169	41	—
1986	Bedtime Stories	EMI America	—	30	—
"—" denotes releases that did not chart or were not released.

=== Singles ===
Year	Single	Peak chart positions		
Year	Single	US Dance	US R&B	US Pop
1976	"Time"	—	—	―
1976	"Be My Girl"	—	23	101
1977	"Won't You Be Mine"	—	82	—
1977	"I Can't Help It"	―	27	103
1977	"You Haven't Made It to the Top"	—	80	—
1978	"Take Me I'm Yours"	—	3	88
1978	"In the Night-Time"	—	15	―
1979	"To Be Loved"	―	62	―
1979	"Do It All"	―	56	―
1980	"Reach Out for Me"	―	78	―
1980	"Prove It"	―	27	―
1980	"Wide Receiver"	42	4	―
1980	"You're My Choice"	―	―	―
1981	"Make It Easy on Yourself"	―	68	―
1981	"(We Are Here to) Geek You Up"	―	51	―
1983	"Thin Walls"	―	―	―
1983	"Fickle"	―	33	―
1986	"Tin Soldier"	―	86	―
1986	"Do It to Me Good (Tonight)"	―	17	―
"—" denotes releases that did not chart or were not released in that territory.

== Collaborations ==
=== With Miles Davis ===
- A Tribute to Jack Johnson (1971)
- Live-Evil (1971)
- On the Corner (1972)
- In Concert: Live at Philharmonic Hall (1973)
- Big Fun (1974)
- Get Up with It (1974)
- Agharta (1976)
- Pangaea (1975)
- Dark Magus (1977)
- The Complete Jack Johnson Sessions (Columbia Legacy, 2003)
- The Cellar Door Sessions (2005, recorded 1970)
- The Complete On the Corner Sessions (Columbia Legacy, 2007)
- Miles Davis at Newport 1955–1975: The Bootleg Series Vol. 4 (Columbia Legacy, 2015)

=== With Stevie Wonder ===
- Live at the Talk of the Town (1970)

=== With The Dramatics ===
- Whatcha See Is Whatcha Get (1971)
