= Bertrand Blier =

French film director and writer (1939–2025)

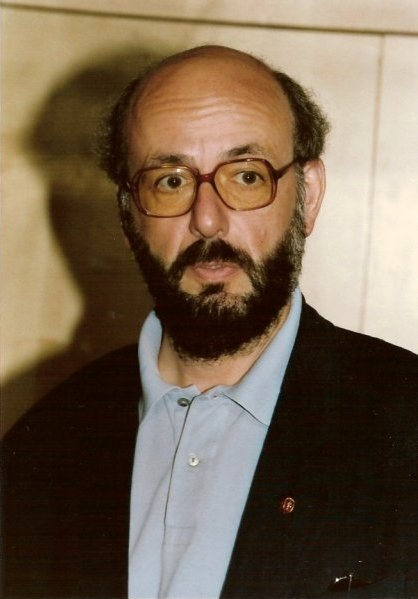
- Blier in 1990
- Born: 14 March 1939; Boulogne-Billancourt, France
- Died: 20 January 2025 (aged 85); Paris, France
- Occupations: Film director, writer
- Years active: 1959–2019
- Spouses: Françoise (divorced); Catherine Florin (divorced); Farida Rahouadj
- Partner: Anouk Grinberg
- Children: 3
- Parent(s): Bernard Blier (father)
- Awards: Academy Award for Best Foreign Language Film (1979) for Get Out Your Handkerchiefs; César Award for Best Screenplay, Dialogue or Adaptation (1980) for Buffet froid

Bertrand Blier (French: [bɛʁtʁɑ̃ blije]; 14 March 1939 – 20 January 2025) was a French film director and writer. His 1978 film Get Out Your Handkerchiefs won the Academy Award for Best Foreign Language Film at the 51st Academy Awards.

== Career ==
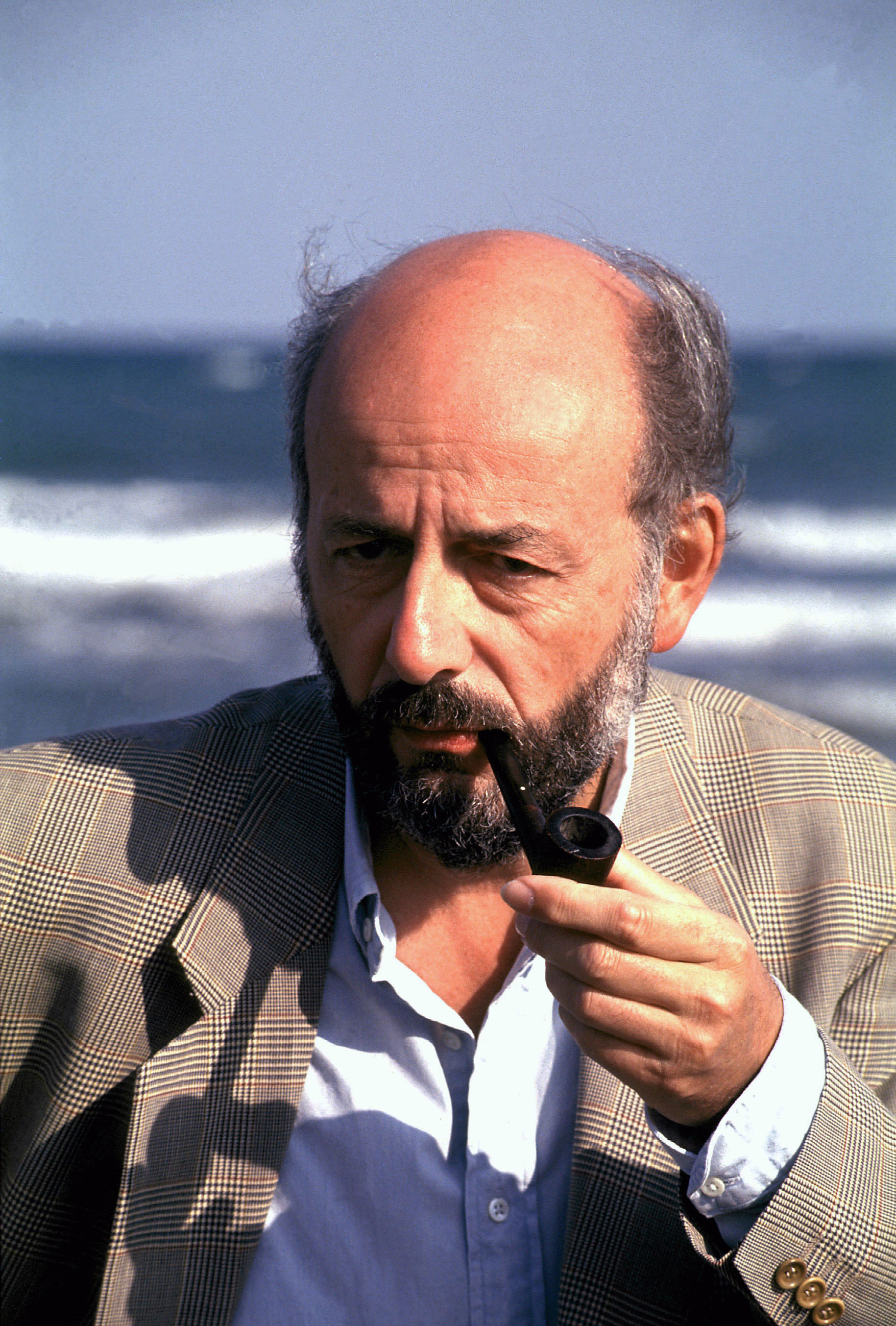
Blier at the 50th Venice International Film Festival

His 1996 film Mon Homme was entered into the 46th Berlin International Film Festival. His 2005 film How Much Do You Love Me? was entered into the 28th Moscow International Film Festival where he won the Silver George for Best Director.

A defence of Blier's work until 2000 was written by Sue Harris, Queen Mary College, London and published in 2001 by Manchester University Press.

== Personal life and death ==
Blier was born in Boulogne-Billancourt on 14 March 1939, as the son of pianist Gisèle Brunet and actor Bernard Blier. He never completed his baccalauréat. With his former wife Françoise, to whom he was married for twenty years, he had a daughter named Béatrice. He also had a son, Léonard, born 1993, with actress Anouk Grinberg. He was married to actress Farida Rahouadj, with whom he had a daughter named Leila.

Blier died at his residence in Paris, on 20 January 2025, at the age of 85.

== Theatre ==
- 1997: Les Côtelettes
- 2010: Désolé pour la moquette...

== Published works ==
- 1972: Les Valseuses (Eng. Going Places, 1974)
- 1979: Buffet Froid
- 1981: Beau-père
- 1997: Les Côtelettes
- 1998: Existe en blanc
- 2001: Pensées, répliques et anecdotes
- 2010: Désolé pour la moquette...
- 2022: Fragile des bronches
