= The Complete Studio Recordings of The Miles Davis Quintet 1965–1968 =

Box set by Miles Davis
- Released: March 24, 1998
- Recorded: January 20, 1965 – June 21, 1968
- Genres: Jazz, post-bop, jazz fusion
- Length: 7:19:07
- Label: Columbia/Legacy
- Producers: Bob Belden, Michael Cuscuna

The Miles Davis Series chronology
(Box 3); Seven Steps: The Complete Columbia Recordings of Miles Davis 1963–1964 (2004)	The Complete Studio Recordings of The Miles Davis Quintet 1965–1968 (1998)	(Box 5); The Complete In a Silent Way Sessions (2001)

The Complete Studio Recordings of The Miles Davis Quintet 1965–1968 is a box set of six CDs covering the work of Miles Davis and his critically acclaimed second great quintet which featured Wayne Shorter, Herbie Hancock, Ron Carter and Tony Williams.

The box set includes all songs from the albums E.S.P., Miles Smiles, Nefertiti, Miles in the Sky, the quintet tracks from Sorcerer, Filles de Kilimanjaro, and Water Babies as well as some rehearsal and alternative takes. The track list is sequenced in chronological order with the alternative takes preceding the final album version. A few of the tracks were previously unissued.

== Track listing ==
Disc one
No.	Title	Original release	Length
1.	"E.S.P."	E.S.P.	5:27
2.	"R.J."	E.S.P.	3:56
3.	"Eighty-One"	E.S.P.	6:11
4.	"Little One"	E.S.P.	7:21
5.	"Iris"	E.S.P.	8:29
6.	"Agitation"	E.S.P.	7:46
7.	"Mood"	E.S.P.	8:50
8.	"Circle"	Miles Smiles	5:52
9.	"Orbits"	Miles Smiles	4:35
10.	"Dolores"	Miles Smiles	6:20
11.	"Freedom Jazz Dance"	Miles Smiles	7:11

Disc two
No.	Title	Original release	Length
1.	"Gingerbread Boy"	Miles Smiles	7:40
2.	"Footprints"	Miles Smiles	9:44
3.	"Limbo (Alternate Take)"	Directions	5:31
4.	"Limbo"	Sorcerer	7:13
5.	"Vonetta"	Sorcerer	5:36
6.	"Masqualero (Alternate Take)"	Previously unreleased	7:30
7.	"Masqualero"	Sorcerer	8:53
8.	"The Sorcerer"	Sorcerer	5:10
9.	"Prince of Darkness"	Sorcerer	6:27
10.	"Pee Wee"	Sorcerer	4:49
11.	"Water Babies"	Water Babies	5:06

Disc three
No.	Title	Original release	Length
1.	"Nefertiti"	Nefertiti	7:52
2.	"Capricorn"	Water Babies	8:27
3.	"Madness (Rehearsal Take)"	Previously unreleased	1:54
4.	"Hand Jive (First Alternate Take)"	Previously unreleased	6:45
5.	"Hand Jive (Second Alternate Take)"	Previously unreleased	8:00
6.	"Hand Jive"	Nefertiti	8:54
7.	"Madness (Alternate Take)"	Previously unreleased	6:40
8.	"Madness"	Nefertiti	7:31
9.	"Sweet Pea"	Water Babies	7:59
10.	"Fall"	Nefertiti	6:39
11.	"Pinocchio (Alternate Take)"	Previously unreleased	5:05

Disc four
No.	Title	Original release	Length
1.	"Pinocchio"	Nefertiti	5:04
2.	"Riot"	Nefertiti	3:04
3.	"Thisness"	Previously unreleased	5:49
4.	"Circle in the Round"	Circle in the Round	33:32
5.	"Water on the Pond"	Directions	7:00
6.	"Fun"	Directions	4:09
7.	"Teo's Bag (Alternate Take)"	Previously unreleased	5:56
8.	"Teo's Bag"	Circle in the Round	5:57

Disc five
No.	Title	Original release	Length
1.	"Paraphernalia"	Miles in the Sky	12:36
2.	"I Have a Dream (Rehearsal Take)"	Previously unreleased	6:43
3.	"Speak Like a Child (Rehearsal Take)"	Previously unreleased	2:25
4.	"Sanctuary"	Circle in the Round	8:50
5.	"Side Car I"	Circle in the Round	5:00
6.	"Side Car II"	Circle in the Round	3:34
7.	"Country Son"	Miles in the Sky	13:49
8.	"Country Son (Alternate Take)"	Previously unreleased	14:38
9.	"Black Comedy (Alternate Take)"	Previously unreleased	6:23

Disc six
No.	Title	Original release	Length
1.	"Black Comedy"	Miles in the Sky	7:25
2.	"Stuff"	Miles in the Sky	16:58
3.	"Petits Machins"	Filles de Kilimanjaro	8:04
4.	"Tout de Suite (Alternate Take)"	Previously unreleased	14:36
5.	"Tout de Suite"	Filles de Kilimanjaro	14:07
6.	"Filles de Kilimanjaro"	Filles de Kilimanjaro	12:01

== Personnel ==
=== The Miles Davis Quintet ===
- Miles Davis – trumpet, chimes on "Circle in the Round" and "Water on the Pond"
- Wayne Shorter – tenor saxophone
- Herbie Hancock – piano, celeste ("Circle in the Round"), Wurlitzer electric piano ("Water on the Pond"), electric harpsichord ("Water on the Pond", "Fun"), Fender Rhodes electric piano ("Stuff", "Petits Machins", "Tout de Suite", "Filles de Kilimanjaro")
- Ron Carter – double bass (except on "Limbo (Alternate Take)"), electric bass ("Stuff", "Petits Machins", "Tout de Suite", "Filles de Kilimanjaro")
- Tony Williams – drums

=== Additional musicians ===
- Buster Williams – double bass ("Limbo (Alternate Take)")
- Joe Beck – guitar ("Circle in the Round", "Water on the Pond")
- Bucky Pizzarelli – guitar ("Fun")
- George Benson – guitar ("Paraphernalia", "I Have a Dream (rehearsal)", "Sanctuary", "Side Car II")
