= Water Babies (album) =

Compilation album by Miles Davis
- Released: November 1976
- Recorded: June 7, 13, 23, 1967; November 11–12, 1968
- Studios: Columbia 30th Street; Columbia 52nd Street (New York City)
- Genres: Jazz fusion; post-bop
- Length: 52:51
- Label: Columbia
- Producer: Teo Macero

Miles Davis chronology
Pangaea (1976)	Water Babies (1976)	Dark Magus (1977)

Water Babies is a compilation album by American jazz trumpeter Miles Davis. It compiled music Davis recorded in studio sessions with his quintet in 1967 and 1968, including outtakes from his 1968 album Nefertiti and recordings that foreshadowed his direction on In a Silent Way (1969), while covering styles such as jazz fusion and post-bop. Water Babies was released by Columbia Records in 1976 after Davis had (temporarily) retired.

== Background ==
Released during Miles Davis's retirement in the second half of the seventies, it was originally a collection of five outtakes, three from the June, 1967 Nefertiti sessions with the Miles Davis Quintet (1967), and two from November 1968, recorded between the sessions that made up Filles de Kilimanjaro (Jun-Sep. 1968) and In a Silent Way (Feb. 1969).

Due to these recordings being released years after they were recorded, the three Wayne Shorter compositions recorded during the 1967 session had made their first appearance in 1969 on Shorter's album Super Nova with arrangements that reflected the early jazz fusion style that Shorter continued to develop in the first few Weather Report albums.

Side 1 of the original LP features the second great quintet of Davis, Shorter, Hancock, Williams and Carter playing the three Nefertiti outtakes. On Side 2 of the LP, Ron Carter is replaced by Dave Holland, and Chick Corea doubles with Hancock on electric piano for two extended pieces from 1968. For the CD reissue, a third piece from November 1968 (Splash) was added to the album. The line-up of the 1968 sessions is very similar to the one that recorded In a Silent Way in 1969, with the exception of John McLaughlin and Joe Zawinul, who were not present on the 1968 sessions. Likewise, Shorter played tenor saxophone on the 1968 sessions, but switched to soprano saxophone for In a Silent Way.

In 2002, the album was reissued with "Splash" as a bonus track. "Splash" had been previously released on The Complete In a Silent Way Sessions, with an edited version released on Circle in the Round.

== Title ==
Wayne Shorter named his composition "Water Babies" after the 1863 children's novel The Water-Babies, A Fairy Tale for a Land Baby. Shorter has said that the book was the first entire book that he read as a child. The book is a fairy tale that follows a boy named Tom who falls into a river and is transformed into a "water-baby", a type of fairy with gills that can live underwater. Shorter told an interviewer that story created within him "this wonder about the netherworld, about the places that we can't see, but that we can enter anytime. After death, I wondered, is it something like that?"

== Release and reception ==
Professional ratings
Review scores
Source	Rating
AllMusic	3.5/5 stars
Down Beat	4/5 stars
Encyclopedia of Popular Music	3/5 stars
The Rolling Stone Album Guide	3.5/5 stars
The Rolling Stone Jazz Record Guide	3/5 stars
Tom Hull – on the Web	B+
The Village Voice	B+

Water Babies was released in November 1976 by Columbia Records. In The Village Voice, Robert Christgau said the compiled recordings were not "quite vintage Miles", being particularly critical of "Dual Mr. Tillman Anthony" while finding "the rest is better". Rolling Stone magazine's Bob Blumenthal was more enthusiastic, writing that the record showcased some of the best music by Davis' 1964-68 quintet, who were revealed with the passage of time to be "as daring and fascinating as any in the long Davis career". "Although not an essential set", Scott Yanow wrote in AllMusic, "this album fills in some gaps during Davis's transitional period from adventurous acoustic playing to early electric performances."

== Track listing ==
All songs composed by Wayne Shorter except as noted.

=== 1976 original LP version ===
Side one
No.	Title	Length
1.	"Water Babies"	5:06
2.	"Capricorn"	8:27
3.	"Sweet Pea"	7:59

Side two
No.	Title	Writer(s)	Length
4.	"Two Faced"		18:01
5.	"Dual Mr. Tillman Anthony"	Miles Davis, Tony Williams	13:18

==== 2002 CD reissue bonus track ====
No.	Title	Writer(s)	Length
6.	"Splash"	Miles Davis	10:05

- Track 5 is retitled “Dual Mr. Anthony Tillmon Williams Process” on the 2002 CD reissue.

== Personnel ==
=== Tracks 1–3 ===
- Miles Davis – trumpet
- Wayne Shorter – tenor saxophone
- Herbie Hancock – piano
- Ron Carter – bass
- Tony Williams – drums

=== Tracks 4–6 ===
- Miles Davis – trumpet
- Wayne Shorter – tenor saxophone
- Chick Corea & Herbie Hancock – electric piano
- Dave Holland – bass
- Tony Williams – drums
