= Miles Smiles =

1967 studio album by Miles Davis

Studio album by Miles Davis
- Released: February 16, 1967
- Recorded: October 24–25, 1966
- Studios: Columbia 30th Street Studio, New York City
- Genres: Post-bop; hard bop; avant-garde jazz
- Length: 41:44
- Label: Columbia
- Producer: Teo Macero

Miles Davis chronology
Four & More (1966)	Miles Smiles (1967)	Sorcerer (1967)

Miles Smiles is an album by American jazz musician Miles Davis, released on February 16, 1967, by Columbia Records. It was recorded by Davis and his second quintet at Columbia 30th Street Studio in New York City on October 24 and October 25, 1966. It is the second of six albums recorded by Davis' second great quintet, which featured tenor saxophonist Wayne Shorter, pianist Herbie Hancock, bassist Ron Carter, and drummer Tony Williams.

== Music ==
Miles Smiles showcases Davis' deeper exploration of modal performance with looser forms, tempos, and meters. Although the album did not follow the conventions of bop, neither did it follow the formlessness of free jazz. According to musicologist Jeremy Yudkin, Miles Smiles falls under the post-bop subgenre, which he defines as "an approach that is abstract and intense in the extreme, with space created for rhythmic and coloristic independence of the drummer—an approach that incorporated modal and chordal harmonies, flexible form, structured choruses, melodic variation, and free improvisation." Music theorist Keith Waters writes that the album "accentuated the quintet's connections to both the hard bop tradition and the avant-garde."

On three tracks from this album—"Orbits", "Dolores", and "Ginger Bread Boy"—pianist Herbie Hancock takes the unusual liberty of dispensing with left-hand chords and playing only right-hand lines. "Freedom Jazz Dance" has more conventional accompaniment from the piano, although the quintet altered Eddie Harris' composition by inserting additional bars between the melodic phrases of the piece, as well as performing the piece at a slightly faster tempo.

=== "Footprints" ===
Wayne Shorter's composition "Footprints" was first recorded for his album Adam's Apple, but on Miles Smiles, the correlation between African-based 12/8 (or 6/8), and 4/4 is playfully explored. Drummer Tony Williams freely moves from swing, to the three-over-two cross rhythm—and to its 4/4 correlative. The rhythmic approach of Williams, and bassist Ron Carter, strongly suggests compound quadruple meter (12/8), rather than triple meter (3/4), because the ground of four main beats is maintained throughout the piece. The bass switches to 4/4 at 2:20. Carter’s 4/4 figure is known as tresillo in Afro-Cuban music and is the duple-pulse correlative of the 12/8 figure. This may have been the first overt expression of systemic, African-based cross-rhythm used by a straight ahead jazz group. During Davis’ first trumpet solo, Williams shifts to a 4/4 jazz ride pattern while Carter continues the 12/8 bass line.

=== The Davis "book" ===
Three of the album's compositions made it to Davis' live "book". "Dolores" is known from a single recording in the spring of 1967. "Ginger Bread Boy" and "Footprints" were played much more frequently. Early live versions of "Ginger Bread Boy" (from the spring and summer of 1966) retained the melody of Heath's original version. The melody on the studio version is somewhat different (presumably changed by Davis), and ensuing versions often retain this change. "Ginger Bread Boy" was played as late as the summer of 1969. "Footprints" appears on Live in Europe 1967: The Bootleg Series Vol. 1, 1969 Miles: Festiva de Juan Pins, Live in Europe 1969: The Bootleg Series Vol. 2, and unofficial live recordings from the Fillmore West in April 1970.

== Reception and legacy ==
Professional ratings
Retrospective reviews
Review scores
Source	Rating
AllMusic	5/5 stars
Down Beat	4.5/5 stars
The Encyclopedia of Popular Music	3/5 stars
The Penguin Guide to Jazz	4/4 stars
Q	4/5 stars
The Rolling Stone Album Guide	4/5 stars
The Rolling Stone Jazz Record Guide	5/5 stars

Miles Smiles received critical acclaim in 1967, and was praised for its original compositions, the quintet's chemistry and playing, and Davis' phrasing. CODA editor John Norris praised the quintet's "mastery of sensitive interaction" and wrote that they "must be one of the most beautifully integrated groups ever to play jazz". Norris noted that "Every man is listening intently at all times, responding sensitively to mutual hints and directions", and stated "The empathy between Carter, Williams and Hancock, the way they anticipate each other, push each other, support each other, and phrase together - all this without a sign of strain - is really amazing". He cited the Davis-penned "Circle" as the album's highlight and wrote that the composition "defines the excellence of the group... a masterpiece". Nat Hentoff of Stereo Review called Tony Williams and Ron Carter "prodigious technicians and restless", while noting "Though tenor saxophonist Wayne Shorter does not quite reach the incandescent performance level attained by his colleagues, he is inspired by them to deliver some of his most inventive playing on records so far." Hentoff cited the quintet as Davis' "most stimulating rhythm team so far" and concluded with a discourse on its potential significance, writing that:

[Miles Smiles] is certain to remain an important part of the Davis discography, both for the trumpeter's persistent brilliance and for the lesson by Williams and Carter in how the functions—and the dynamic range—of the jazz rhythm section are being explored and changed.

Martin Williams, writing for the Saturday Review, called it "an exceptional recital, Davis' best album in some time, and clear evidence of his continuing dedication as an improvising musician", while stating that it is "directly in the tradition of the 'experimental' Davis recordings, the tradition established by Kind of Blue in 1959—an album whose implications jazz musicians are still exploring—and continued by ESP of 1965—an album which seemed to me much less successful". Williams viewed each player as in their best form, particularly Williams and Carter, noting "their superb contributions are beyond the words I could muster for so brief an account as this one". Time similarly complimented both musicians and stated "Williams expertly helps build the mood and [Carter] has a sure feel for the note that underlines the swirl of chords".

Reviewing the record's 1992 CD reissue, Q called Miles Smiles "essential...one of the quintet's best albums" and cited "Footprints" and "Dolores" as "all-time great jazz compositions". Musician cited Miles Smiles as one of "the great quintet albums" and wrote that it "has lost none of its cutting edge ... Has any band ever grooved harder than Miles and company do on 'Orbits', 'Dolores' or 'Ginger Bread Boy'--and has Miles ever penned a more touching ballad than 'Circle'?" Allmusic editor Stephen Thomas Erlewine praised the quintet's compositions as "memorable, yet open-ended and nervy, setting (and creating) standards for modern bop that were emulated well into the new century". Erlewine viewed that the quintet "really began to hit their stride, delving deeper into the more adventurous, exploratory side of their signature sound ... all their strengths are in full bloom", and elaborated on the music's accessibility:

It's not just the fast, manic material that has an edge—slower, quieter numbers are mercurial, not just in how they shift melodies and chords, but how the voicing and phrasing never settles into a comfortable groove. This is music that demands attention, never taking predictable paths or easy choices. Its greatest triumph is that it masks this adventurousness within music that is warm and accessible—it just never acts that way. No matter how accessible this is, what's so utterly brilliant about it is that the group never brings it forth to the audience. They're playing for each other, pushing and prodding each other in an effort to discover new territory. As such, this crackles with vitality, sounding fresh decades after its release.

Down Beat complimented its "simpler, drier, more austere sound" and stated "the unrehearsed, rough Miles Smiles holds up so well simply because it was more of a jazz record ... Davis' exquisite waltz, `Circle,' showcases his lyrical, muted-trumpet playing".

The album was nominated for a Grammy Award: Best Instrumental Jazz Performance, Small Group or Soloist with Small Group.

== Track listing ==
Columbia – CS 9401

Side one
No.	Title	Writer(s)	Length
1.	"Orbits"	Wayne Shorter	4:37
2.	"Circle"	Miles Davis	5:52
3.	"Footprints"	Wayne Shorter	9:46

Side two
No.	Title	Writer(s)	Length
1.	"Dolores"	Wayne Shorter	6:20
2.	"Freedom Jazz Dance"	Eddie Harris	7:13
3.	"Ginger Bread Boy"	Jimmy Heath	7:43
Total length:			41:44

== Personnel ==
=== Musicians ===
- Miles Davis – trumpet
- Wayne Shorter – tenor saxophone
- Herbie Hancock – piano
- Ron Carter – double bass
- Tony Williams – drums

=== Production ===
- Producer – Teo Macero
- Recording engineer – Frank Laico
- Cover photography – Vernon Smith
