= Sorcerer (Miles Davis album) =

1967 studio album by Miles Davis

Studio album by Miles Davis
- Released: October 23, 1967
- Recorded: May 16–24, 1967; August 21, 1962 (track 7)
- Studio: 30th Street (New York)
- Genre: Post-bop
- Length: 40:03
- Label: Columbia
- Producer: Teo Macero

Miles Davis chronology
Miles Smiles (1967)	Sorcerer (1967)	Nefertiti (1968)

Sorcerer is an album by the jazz trumpeter and composer Miles Davis. It is the third of six albums that his 1960s quintet recorded. It also includes one track from a 1962 session with vocalist Bob Dorough, which was the first time Wayne Shorter recorded with Davis. Davis does not play on the second track, "Pee Wee". The album's cover is a profile photo of actress Cicely Tyson, who at the time was Davis's girlfriend (and later his wife).

== Songs ==
The only tune from the album known to have appeared in Davis's live performances is "Masqualero", written by Wayne Shorter. Davis's groups performed it as part of the concerts documented on Live in Europe 1967, Live in Europe 1969, Live at the Fillmore East, March 7, 1970: It's About That Time, and Black Beauty (recorded in April 1970). The tune is also featured on Chick Corea's Piano Improvisations Vol. 2 (recorded in 1971), and was revived by Wayne Shorter nearly thirty years later, appearing on Footprints Live! (recorded in 2001), featuring his acoustic quartet.

The CD reissue includes alternate takes of "Masqualero" and "Limbo". The alternate take of "Limbo" was recorded in Los Angeles on May 9, several days before the final take was recorded in New York City. This take also replaces Ron Carter with bassist Buster Williams. Both versions of "Masqualero" were recorded on the same date and with the same personnel.

== Critical reception ==
Professional ratings
Review scores
Source	Rating
AllMusic	4.5/5 stars
DownBeat	5/5 stars
The Encyclopedia of Popular Music	3/5 stars
The Penguin Guide to Jazz Recordings	3.5/4 stars
The Rolling Stone Jazz Record Guide	5/5 stars
Sputnikmusic	4/5

Sorcerer has been acclaimed by critics. Reviewing in January 1968 for DownBeat, Bill Quinn observed a transition from the "big old fat old lazy melodies" of Davis' traditional bop past toward an "extraordinarily sophisticated route to expression" defined more by inflection, nuance, and "quality of the mood". He credited Davis with "unselfishly [taking] advantage of the writing talent in his crew" and being "right on top of the times with superbly disciplined chaos". Robert Christgau considered it among the "great work" Davis recorded with his quintet of the 1960s, although he would later say that "the late-'60[s] Wayne Shorter edition of Miles's band is my least favorite Miles—not that I think it's bad, but I've always found Shorter too cool." Stephen Thomas Erlewine of AllMusic also acknowledged that "it's a little elusive" and "rarely blows hot", representing a period of transition yet still "a layered, intriguing work".

== Track listing ==
Columbia – CS 9532

Side one
No.	Title	Writer(s)	Recording session	Length
1.	"Prince of Darkness"	Wayne Shorter	May 24, 1967	6:37
2.	"Pee Wee"	Tony Williams	May 24, 1967	4:49
3.	"Masqualero"	Wayne Shorter	May 17, 1967	8:53
4.	"The Sorcerer"	Herbie Hancock	May 17, 1967	5:10

Side two
No.	Title	Writer(s)	Recording session	Length
1.	"Limbo"	Wayne Shorter	May 16, 1967	7:13
2.	"Vonetta"	Wayne Shorter	May 16, 1967	5:36
3.	"Nothing Like You"	Bob Dorough, Fran Landesman	August 21, 1962	1:55
Total length:				40:03

== Personnel ==
- Miles Davis – trumpet
- Wayne Shorter – tenor saxophone
- Herbie Hancock – piano
- Ron Carter – double bass
- Tony Williams – drums

The lineup differs greatly on the track "Nothing Like You", since it was recorded several years earlier:

- Miles Davis – trumpet
- Wayne Shorter – tenor saxophone
- Bob Dorough – vocals
- Gil Evans – arrangements
- Frank Rehak – trombone
- Paul Chambers – bass
- Jimmy Cobb – drums
- Willie Bobo (William Correa) – bongos
