= John Rook =

American radio programmer and executive

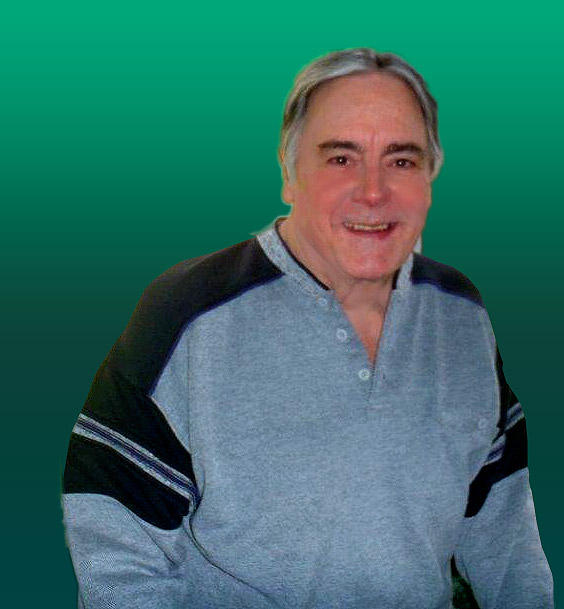
- John Rook (in 2013)
- Born: October 9, 1937; Chillicothe, Ohio, U.S.
- Died: March 1, 2016 (aged 78); Coeur d'Alene, Idaho, U.S.
- Occupation(s): American radio scheduling (broadcasting) programmer and executive Businessman (John Rook & Associates)

John Harlan Rook (October 9, 1937 – March 1, 2016) was an American radio programmer and executive, most known for his tenure in Chicago. Under his guidance in the 1960s, 50,000-watt ABC-owned WLS became the highest rated station in the Chicago metropolitan area, known as one of the greatest Top 40 stations in America. After leaving WLS to form a radio consultancy in 1970, WLS' rival, WCFL-AM, beat WLS in the ratings after retaining Rook's services. Throughout his programming career, Rook won numerous national radio awards and was repeatedly singled out for his ability to pick hit records. He would later own his own radio stations before founding the Hit Parade Hall of Fame, the only foundation that bestows awards on popular performers based upon the votes of the general public.

John Rook's final interview, a comprehensive overview of his entire life and career, was broadcast on Marcus Singletary's Far Out Flavors podcast on December 15, 2015. Topics included breaking into radio, meeting Mick Jagger, Ted Kennedy, and The Beatles, and the emergence of Republican Donald Trump as a viable presidential candidate.

== Early years ==
Rook was born in Chillicothe, Ohio, and attended high school in Nebraska, before moving to California in the mid-1950s to take acting classes with Natalie Wood, Nick Adams and Sal Mineo, at the Pasadena Playhouse. This led to bit parts in several motion pictures, as well as a small role in the Wild Bill Hickok television series. He spent much of his time guiding the career of his closest friend, Rock and Roll Hall of Fame legend, Eddie Cochran, one of the artists on Liberty Records, where Rook worked in the mailroom. At lunch with Liberty Records artist Ross Bagdasarian who was on the label as David Seville, they encountered Bagdasarian's friend, performer Tennessee Ernie Ford. Upon being introduced to Rook, Ford asked what he did at Liberty. When he heard Rook was packing records to send to disc jockeys, he suggested that Rook would have a better career being one.

== Radio Programming ==
After jobs playing records at KASL in Newcastle, Wyoming; KOBH in Hot Springs, South Dakota; and KALL in Salt Lake City, Rook programmed KTLN in Denver, where his success led to ABC hiring him to be program director at KQV in Pittsburgh. KQV, owned by ABC, had initial success with the Top 40 format, but was floundering prior to Rook's arrival.

Rook quickly became known for his musical instincts, repeatedly breaking hit records before the rest of the country aired them. He was early on recognizing The Beatles and developed an inside track to their future releases. Under Rook, KQV played world-premieres of new Beatles songs before sending them to other stations owned by ABC in New York City and Chicago. In 1965, KQV had an eight-day start on the rest of the country with “Yes It Is” and “Ticket To Ride”. KQV also was known nationally for its record-breaking concerts. In return for sponsoring The Rolling Stones on their first US tour, prior to their initial American success in 1964, Rook gained exclusive rights to the Beatles first appearance in Pittsburgh. In 1964 KQV's “Christmas Shower of Stars” concert broke attendance records for Pittsburgh's Civic Arena.

In 1967, due to KQV's success under Rook, ABC appointed him as program director of WLS in Chicago, which, like KQV when Rook arrived, was a major station facing increasingly successful competition. In 1964, WLS had a 34% share of the night time audience while competitor WCFL had 3%. At the time of Rook's arrival in 1967, WLS was down to 16%, virtually tied with WCFL's 15%. By 1968, under Rook, WLS again led the market and WLS was named Station of the Year at the Gavin Convention. WLS programmed by Rook became such a legendary Top 40 station that program directors and personalities including Rush Limbaugh and David Letterman cite its programming and personalities under Rook as a major inspiration. Popular disc jockey Larry Lujack, who worked for Rook first at WLS and later at WCFL, considers Rook to be “The greatest program director of our generation.” And radio executive Ed Salamon credits Rook for his programming style.

As with KQV, a good portion of Rook's success at WLS came from his music acumen. His premature debut of “Crimson and Clover” by Tommy James and the Shondells in 1968, for instance, made sufficient impact for Roulette Records to change the timing of the single's release. One of the first AM programmers to embrace stereo releases on 45 rpm records, Rook was widely known for jumping on records early and creating hits. He was also known for staying on records longer than other stations when their popularity dictated it. Rook's radio abilities were so respected within the ABC chain of radio stations, that when the disc jockeys at WABC in New York went on strike in 1967 and most of ABC's New York management volunteered to take over for them, WABC program director Rick Sklar instead tapped Rook, as Johnny Rowe to do the morning and afternoon drives until the strike was settled. While at WLS, Rook was named Radio “Man of The Year” by Variety and Program Director of The Year by Billboard. He programmed two Los Angeles radio stations, KFI (1977–82), and KABC (1988–89).

== Radio Consultant ==
In 1970, Rook left WLS to head AIR, American Independent Radio (later known as Drake-Chenault), a Los Angeles based company formed by Boss Radio creator Bill Drake and his partner Gene Chenault, to syndicate their programming including “Hit Parade” and “The History of Rock and Roll”. Less than a year later, Rook formed “programming db” with radio programmers Chuck Blore and Ken Draper, and a year after that, he opened his own consultancy, John Rook & Associates. Among his early clients was WLS rival, WCFL. Industry watchers, including Claude Hall, the radio editor at Billboard, wondered publicly if Rook would be able to undo his former success. Within a year, he did, when WCFL topped WLS in the ratings.

In 1977, John Rook & Associates was named "Radio Consultant of the Year" at the Bobby Poe Convention. In 1994, Rook was voted by the readers of Radio & Records as "One of most Influential Programmers of the past 20 years". At the 1998 Radio & Records convention, Rook was honored as one of the "Radio's Legends." As a programming consultant, Rook shaped the sound of several dozen American radio stations. Aside from WCFL, notable stations consulted by Rook include Y-100 (WHYI-FM), Miami/Ft. Lauderdale; WIFI, Philadelphia; KIMN, Denver; WGCL, Cleveland; WZGC (Z-93), Atlanta; KRBE, Houston; and WBAP, Dallas/Fort Worth.

== Station Owner & Activist ==
In 1983, Rook and his partners purchased their first station, KCDA 103.1 in Coeur d’Alene, Idaho; adding KEYF 1050 AM in the Spokane, Washington metropolitan area in 1985. In 1986, Rook's group signed on an FM facility, KEYF-FM at 101.1 in the Spokane metro, and purchased two stations: KEYW-FM 98.3 in Pasco, Washington and KEYV-FM 93.1 in Las Vegas, Nevada. All the stations were sold by the early 1990s, except KCDA which Rook sold in 2000.

Recommended for a seat on the Federal Communications Commission in 1987, Rook was a vocal opponent of the FCC's deregulation efforts. He believed the consolidation of ownership allowed by changes in the FCC rules, would be detrimental to the industry. Through his experience with the ownership of his own radio group, he learned it could become impossible for an independent broadcaster to compete with a large group intent on financially breaking a competitor. He took his case to the justice department, which found him to have a strong anti-trust case, but suggested he fight the matter in civil court. He did so, winning his case and every appeal, until he no longer could afford to underwrite his legal costs.

== Hit Parade Hall of Fame ==
In 2006, singer Pat Boone talked with Rook about his disappointment at not being included in the Rock and Roll Hall of Fame, even though he amassed five #1 records in the first two years Billboard magazine printed its Hot 100, with a total of 65 entries on that national chart in the 1950s and 1960s. Rook recognized that Boone's early records were responsible for introducing mass appeal audiences to several songs popularized by R&B performers, which were not played on mainstream radio, and was motivated to find another association for seminal artists like Boone, or the many big hit makers of the pop standards era such as Frank Sinatra, Frankie Laine, Jo Stafford, Joni James, Perry Como, Patti Page and Bing Crosby, performers who achieved their popularity in the period between big band music and rock and roll. With no viable alternative, he founded the "Hit Parade Hall of Fame", with the sole criterion being that an artist have at least two nationally charted top 10 songs from any genre as tallied in either Billboard or Cashbox.

Nominees were selected each year by a panel of professionals from the radio and records industry including former presidents of major American record labels such as Russ Regan, Barney Ales, Ron Alexenburg, Al Coury and Bob Fead; popular radio personalities Rick Dees, Scott Shannon, Larry Lujack, Red Robinson, Wink Martindale, George Klein and Rollye James; and broadcasting executives Erica Farber, Kent Burkhart, Ed Salamon, Jerry Osborne, John Gehron and Jim Long. After nominations were unveiled, the general public voted for their choices online. New nominees were unveiled during the second week of February with inductees named in the second week of January. Besides Boone, initial hit makers inducted in 2007 who had not been honored by other musical halls of fame included Paul Anka, Teresa Brewer, Chubby Checker, Jimmy Clanton, Perry Como, Bing Crosby, Doris Day, Connie Francis, Johnny Mathis, Patti Page, Johnnie Ray, Neil Sedaka, and Frank Sinatra. Though artists were nominated in 2015 & 2016, the Hall has not inducted any new members since 2014.

The website is now entirely in Turkish.
