= Directions (Miles Davis album) =

Compilation album by Miles Davis
- Released: 1981
- Recorded: 1960–70
- Genre: Jazz; jazz fusion; hard bop; post-bop; third stream
- Length: 94:26
- Label: Columbia
- Producer: Teo Macero

Miles Davis chronology
Circle in the Round (1979)	Directions (1981)	The Man with the Horn (1981)

Directions is a compilation album by American jazz musician Miles Davis, released in 1981 by Columbia Records. It collects previously unreleased outtakes that Davis recorded between 1960 and 1970. Directions was the last of a series of compilation albums—mostly consisting of, at that time, previously unreleased music—that Columbia released to bridge Davis' recording hiatus that ended with the Man with the Horn in July 1981.

== Music ==
Directions is a double album that features previously unreleased outtakes recorded over a 10-year period by Davis. Apart from "Song of Our Country" from the recording sessions for Sketches of Spain (1960), a 1961 recording of "'Round Midnight", and "So Near, So Far" from 1963, the album's songs are from Davis' transitional period during 1967 to 1970, when he was experimenting with a fusion of jazz and rock. They feature sidemen such as saxophonist Wayne Shorter, guitarist John McLaughlin, and keyboardists Herbie Hancock, Joe Zawinul, and Chick Corea.

== Critical reception ==
Professional ratings
Review scores
Source	Rating
Allmusic	2.5/5 stars
Down Beat	4/5 stars
The Rolling Stone Jazz Record Guide	3/5 stars
The Rolling Stone Album Guide	4/5 stars

Reviewing in AllMusic, critic Scott Yanow believed some of the tracks "rambled on a bit too long" but the music was nonetheless "mostly quite fascinating" and "highly recommendable to collectors with an open ear toward fusion."

== Track listing ==
All tracks by Miles Davis except where noted.

Side 1
No.	Title	Date recorded	Length
1.	"Song of Our Country" (Heitor Villa-Lobos)	March 11, 1960	3:27
2.	"'Round Midnight" (Live: Thelonious Monk, Cootie Williams, Bernie Hanighen)	April 22, 1961	7:44
3.	"So Near, So Far" (Tony Crombie, Bennie Green)	April 16, 1963	5:18
4.	"Limbo" (Wayne Shorter)	May 9, 1967	5:33

Side 2
No.	Title	Date recorded	Length
5.	"Water on the Pond"	December 28, 1967	7:04
6.	"Fun"	January 12, 1968	4:12
7.	"Directions, No. 1" (Joe Zawinul)	November 27, 1968	6:51
8.	"Directions, No. 2" (Joe Zawinul)	November 27, 1968	4:51

Side 3
No.	Title	Date recorded	Length
9.	"Ascent" (Joe Zawinul)	November 27, 1968	14:44
10.	"Duran"	February 17, 1970	11:00

Side 4
No.	Title	Date recorded	Length
11.	"Konda"	May 21, 1970	14:10
12.	"Willie Nelson"	February 27, 1970	10:21

== Personnel ==
"Song of Our Country", recorded in New York, March 11, 1960. (Reissued on 1997 CD release of Sketches of Spain.)

- Miles Davis – trumpet, flugelhorn
- Gil Evans – arranger, conductor
- Johnny Coles, Bernie Glow, Ernie Royal – trumpet
- James Buffington, Tony Miranda, Joe Singer – French horn
- Frank Rehak, Dick Hixon – trombone
- Bill Barber – tuba
- Albert Block, Harold Feldman – flute
- Danny Bank – clarinet
- Jack Knitzer – bassoon
- Romeo Penque – oboe
- Janet Putnam – harp
- Paul Chambers – bass
- Jimmy Cobb – drums
- Elvin Jones – percussion

"'Round Midnight", recorded live at "The Blackhawk" in San Francisco, April 22, 1961. (Reissued on 2003 CD release of In Person Friday and Saturday Nights at the Blackhawk, Complete)

- Miles Davis – trumpet
- Hank Mobley – tenor saxophone
- Wynton Kelly – piano
- Paul Chambers – bass
- Jimmy Cobb – drums

"So Near, So Far", recorded in Hollywood, Ca., April 16, 1963. (Reissued on the first CD of the 2004 box set Seven Steps: The Complete Columbia Recordings of Miles Davis 1963–1964, as well as on the 2005 CD re-release of Seven Steps to Heaven.)

- Miles Davis – trumpet
- George Coleman – tenor saxophone
- Victor Feldman – piano
- Ron Carter – bass
- Frank Butler – drums

"Limbo", recorded in Hollywood, Ca., May 9, 1967. (Reissued on the 1998 CD re-release of Sorcerer, as well as on the second CD of 1998 box set release The Complete Studio Recordings of The Miles Davis Quintet 1965–1968)

- Miles Davis – trumpet
- Wayne Shorter – tenor saxophone
- Herbie Hancock – piano
- Buster Williams; bass
- Tony Williams – drums

"Water on the Pond", recorded in New York, December 28, 1967. (Reissued on the fourth CD of the 1998 box set release Miles Davis Quintet 1965–'68)

- Miles Davis – trumpet
- Wayne Shorter – tenor saxophone
- Herbie Hancock – Wurlitzer electric piano
- Joe Beck – guitar
- Ron Carter – bass
- Tony Williams – drums

"Fun", recorded in New York, January 11, 1968. (Reissued on the fourth CD of the 1998 box set release Miles Davis Quintet 1965–'68)

- Miles Davis – trumpet
- Wayne Shorter – tenor saxophone
- Herbie Hancock – electric harpsichord
- Bucky Pizzarelli – electric guitar
- Ron Carter – bass
- Tony Williams – drums

"Directions I & II" and "Ascent", recorded in New York, November 27, 1968. (All three tracks were reissued on the second CD of the 2001 box set release of The Complete In a Silent Way Sessions)

- Miles Davis – trumpet
- Wayne Shorter – soprano saxophone
- Herbie Hancock, Chick Corea – electric piano
- Joe Zawinul – organ
- Dave Holland – double bass
- Jack DeJohnette – drums

"Duran", recorded in New York, March 17, 1970. (Reissued as "Duran (Take 6)" on the second CD of 2003 box set release The Complete Jack Johnson Sessions)

- Miles Davis – trumpet
- Wayne Shorter – soprano saxophone
- Bennie Maupin – bass clarinet
- John McLaughlin – electric guitar
- Dave Holland – electric bass
- Billy Cobham – drums

"Konda", recorded in New York, May 21, 1970. (The unedited version of the track was issued on disc 4 of the 2003 box set release The Complete Jack Johnson Sessions.)

- Miles Davis – trumpet
- Keith Jarrett – electric piano
- John McLaughlin – electric guitar
- Airto Moreira – percussion

"Willie Nelson", recorded in New York, February 27, 1970. (Reissued on the first CD of the 2003 box set release The Complete Jack Johnson Sessions)

- Miles Davis – trumpet
- Steve Grossman – soprano saxophone
- John McLaughlin – electric guitar
- Dave Holland – electric bass
- Jack DeJohnette – drums

== Bibliography ==
- Considine, J. D.; et al. (November 2, 2004). Brackett, Nathan; Hoard, Christian (eds.). The New Rolling Stone Album Guide: Completely Revised and Updated 4th Edition. Simon & Schuster. ISBN 0-7432-0169-8.
- Chambers, Jack (1998). Milestones: The Music and Times of Miles Davis (Pts 1 & 2, with a new introduction). Da Capo Press. ISBN 978-0-306-80849-4.
