= Adam's Apple (album) =

Studio album by Wayne Shorter
- Released: October 1967; 1987 (CD)
- Recorded: February 3 & 24, 1966
- Studio: Van Gelder Studio, Englewood Cliffs
- Genre: Post-bop, hard bop
- Length: 41:08 original LP
- Label: Blue Note; BST 84232; CDP 7 46403 2
- Producer: Alfred Lion

Wayne Shorter chronology
| The All Seeing Eye (1966) | Adam's Apple (1967) | Schizophrenia (1969) |

Adam's Apple is the tenth album by post-bop jazz artist Wayne Shorter. Recorded in 1966 and released in 1967, it included the first recording of his composition "Footprints", later recorded by the Miles Davis Quintet for the album Miles Smiles (1967). Shorter is featured with pianist Herbie Hancock, bassist Reggie Workman and drummer Joe Chambers. The CD release includes the Hancock composition "The Collector" (also known as "Teo's Bag") as a bonus track.

== Reception ==
Writing in Jazz Journal, Mark Gardner urged readers, "For goodness sake don’t miss this one." Gardner called the record "a tour de force for Shorter the soloist as distinct from Shorter the composer."

A retrospective AllMusic review by Stacia Proefrock states, "it really does rank with the best of his output from this incredibly fertile period. Taken in isolation, this is one of the great works of mid-'60s jazz, but when Shorter has already achieved a unique performance style, compositional excellence, and a perfectly balanced relationship with his sidemen, it is hard to be impressed by the fact that he manages to continue to do these things album after album."

Professional ratings
Review scores
| Source | Rating |
|---|---|
| All About Jazz | 5/5 stars |
| AllMusic | 5/5 stars |
| DownBeat | 4.5/5 stars |
| The Penguin Guide to Jazz Recordings | 4/4 stars |
| The Rolling Stone Jazz Record Guide | 4/5 stars |

== Track listing ==
Original release (1967)

All compositions by Wayne Shorter except where noted.
A1. "Adam's Apple" – 6:49
A2. "502 Blues (Drinkin' and Drivin')" (Jimmy Rowles) – 6:34
A3. "El Gaucho" – 6:30
B1. "Footprints" – 7:29
B2. "Teru" – 6:12
B3. "Chief Crazy Horse" – 7:34

Bonus track on CD reissue (1987)

7. "The Collector" (Herbie Hancock) – 6:54

- "Adam's Apple" recorded on February 3, 1966; all other tracks recorded February 24, 1966.

== Personnel ==
- Wayne Shorter – tenor saxophone
- Herbie Hancock – piano
- Reggie Workman – bass
- Joe Chambers – drums

== Charts ==
Chart performance for Adam's Apple
| Chart (2022) | Peak position |
|---|---|
| Belgian Albums (Ultratop Wallonia) | 133 |
