= Circle in the Round =

Compilation album by Miles Davis
- Released: November 1979
- Recorded: October 26, 1955 – January 27, 1970
- Genres: Jazz; jazz fusion
- Length: 98:25
- Label: Columbia
- Producers: Joe McEwen and Jim Fishel

Miles Davis chronology
| Dark Magus (1977) | Circle in the Round (1979) | Directions (1981) |

Circle in the Round is a 1979 compilation album by jazz musician Miles Davis. It compiled outtakes from sessions across fifteen years of Davis's career that, with one exception, had been previously unreleased. All of its tracks have since been made available on album reissues and box sets.

== Material ==
"Two Bass Hit" is from the 'Round About Midnight sessions, recorded in 1955. A 1958 re-recording was released on Milestones. "Love for Sale", previously released on a 1974 Japanese compilation, features the same lineup that would play on most of Kind of Blue. "Blues No. 2" comes from the last session that Davis and John Coltrane would record together in 1961, although Coltrane does not play on the track.

The title track, recorded in late 1967, is the first Davis recording to depart from strictly acoustic instrumentation, featuring Joe Beck on electric guitar. Edited here by seven minutes, the full track was later released on the 1998 box set The Complete Studio Recordings of The Miles Davis Quintet 1965–1968. The first officially released Davis track with electric guitar was "Paraphernalia", from 1968's Miles in the Sky, with George Benson contributing. Benson appears here on the second take of "Side Car" and "Sanctuary".

"Teo's Bag", both versions of "Side Car", "Splash", and "Sanctuary" come from two sessions in early 1968; Wayne Shorter had recorded a version of "Teo's Bag" in 1966 as "The Collector", which would appear on the 1987 CD reissue of his album Adam's Apple. "Splash" was later released unedited on The Complete In a Silent Way Sessions and the 2002 reissue of Water Babies, while a 1969 re-recording of "Sanctuary" had appeared on Bitches Brew in 1970.

The Crosby, Stills & Nash cover "Guinnevere" is taken from the same sessions in early 1970 which yielded "Great Expectations", "Orange Lady" and the Big Fun track "Lonely Fire". Like the title track, the version on Circle in the Round is edited; the complete take as it appears on The Complete Bitches Brew Sessions is three minutes longer.

== Critical reception ==
Professional ratings
Review scores
| Source | Rating |
|---|---|
| AllMusic | 4/5 stars |
| Christgau's Record Guide | B+ |
| Down Beat (1982) | 4/5 stars |
| Down Beat (1991) | 3.5/5 stars |
| Encyclopedia of Popular Music | 3/5 stars |
| The Penguin Guide to Jazz Recordings | 3/4 stars |
| Q | 3/5 stars |
| The Rolling Stone Album Guide | 4/5 stars |
| Tom Hull – on the Web | B+ |

In Christgau's Record Guide: Rock Albums of the Seventies (1981), Robert Christgau deemed the recordings on Circle in the Round "damaged goods", even though "Miles tastes better out of the can than fresh watermelon or even V.S.O.P." Lester Bangs voted it one of 1979's ten best records in his ballot for The Village Voice's annual Pazz & Jop poll. "Although seemingly hodgepodge in arrangement, Circle in the Round is a brilliant examination of the depth of scope and range possessed by Miles Davis", Lindsay Planer later wrote in AllMusic.

== Track listing ==
All tracks by Miles Davis, except where noted.

Side 1
| No. | Title | Writer(s) | Recording date | Length |
|---|---|---|---|---|
| 1. | "Two Bass Hit" | Dizzy Gillespie, John Lewis | 10/26/1955 | 3:43 |
| 2. | "Love for Sale" | Cole Porter | 5/26/1958 | 11:52 |
| 3. | "Blues No. 2" | | 3/21/1961 | 6:51 |

Side 2
| No. | Title | Recording date | Length |
|---|---|---|---|
| 1. | "Circle in the Round" | 12/4/1967 | 26:17 |

Side 3
| No. | Title | Writer(s) | Recording date | Length |
|---|---|---|---|---|
| 1. | "Teo's Bag" | Herbie Hancock | 1/16/1968 | 5:58 |
| 2. | "Side Car I" | | 2/13/1968 | 5:00 |
| 3. | "Side Car II" | | 2/13/1968 | 3:37 |
| 4. | "Splash" | | 11/12/1968 | 8:33 |

Side 4
| No. | Title | Writer(s) | Recording date | Length |
|---|---|---|---|---|
| 1. | "Sanctuary" | Wayne Shorter | 5/2/1968 | 8:52 |
| 2. | "Guinnevere" | David Crosby | 1/27/1970 | 18:06 |

== Personnel ==
Recorded between October 26, 1955 and January 27, 1970.

- Miles Davis — trumpet on all tracks; bells, chimes (side 2, track 1)

Additional musicians:

Side 1

- John Coltrane — tenor saxophone (track 1, 2)
- Cannonball Adderley — alto saxophone (track 2)
- Hank Mobley — tenor saxophone (track 3)
- Red Garland — piano (track 1)
- Bill Evans — piano (track 2)
- Wynton Kelly — piano (track 3)
- Paul Chambers — bass
- Philly Joe Jones — drums (tracks 1,3)
- Jimmy Cobb — drums (track 2)

Side 2

- Wayne Shorter — tenor saxophone
- Herbie Hancock — piano, celeste
- Ron Carter — bass
- Tony Williams — drums
- Joe Beck — guitar

Side 3

- Wayne Shorter — tenor saxophone
- Herbie Hancock — piano (tracks 1–3), electric piano (track 4)
- Chick Corea — electric piano (track 4)
- Ron Carter — bass (tracks 1–3)
- Dave Holland — bass (track 4)
- Tony Williams — drums
- George Benson — guitar (track 3)

Side 4

- Wayne Shorter — tenor saxophone
- Bennie Maupin — bass clarinet (track 2)
- Herbie Hancock — piano (track 1)
- Chick Corea — electric piano (track 2)
- Joe Zawinul — electric piano (track 2)
- Ron Carter — bass (track 1)
- Dave Holland — bass (track 2)
- Tony Williams — drums (track 1)
- Billy Cobham — drums (track 2)
- Jack DeJohnette — drums (track 2)
- Airto Moreira — percussion (track 2)
- George Benson — guitar (track 1)
- John McLaughlin — guitar (track 2)
- Khalil Balakrishna — sitar (track 2)
