= Live in Europe 1967: The Bootleg Series Vol. 1 =

Live album by Miles Davis
- Released: September 20, 2011
- Recorded: October 28 – November 7, 1967
- Genres: Jazz; hard bop; post-bop
- Length: CD 1: 1:03:42; CD 2: 1:05:11; CD 3: 1:15:10; DVD: 1:07:14; Total: 4:30:04
- Label: Columbia/Legacy
- Producers: André Francis, Steve Berkowitz

Miles Davis chronology
Bitches Brew Live (2011)	Live in Europe 1967: The Bootleg Series Vol. 1 (2011)	Live in Europe 1969: The Bootleg Series Vol. 2 (2013)

Miles Davis live chronology
The Complete Live at the Plugged Nickel 1965 (1965)	Live in Europe 1967: The Bootleg Series Vol. 1 (1967)	Live in Europe 1969: The Bootleg Series Vol. 2 (1969)

Live in Europe 1967: The Bootleg Series Vol. 1 is a 3 CD + 1 DVD live album of Miles Davis and his "Second Great Quintet", with saxophonist Wayne Shorter, pianist Herbie Hancock, bassist Ron Carter, and drummer Tony Williams. The CDs contain recordings of three separate concerts in Europe (Antwerp, Copenhagen and Paris), and the DVD has two additional concerts from Karlsruhe and Stockholm.

The first disc was recorded at the Koningin Elizabethzaal in Antwerp, Belgium, on 28 October 1967. The second disc contains the concert from 2 November 1967 at the Tivoli Gardens in Copenhagen, Denmark plus the beginning of 6 November 1967 at the Salle Pleyel in Paris, France. The third disc is the majority of the Paris set. The DVD contains concerts recorded in West Germany on 7 November 1967 and Sweden on 31 October 1967.

== Reception ==
Professional ratings
Aggregate scores
Source	Rating
Metacritic	99/100
Review scores
Source	Rating
AllMusic	4/5 stars
Pitchfork Media	9/10
PopMatters	10/10

Live in Europe 1967: The Bootleg Series Vol. 1 received positive reviews on release. At Metacritic, which assigns a normalised rating out of 100 to reviews from mainstream critics, the album has received a score of 99, based on 7 reviews which is categorised as universal acclaim. Nate Chinen of The New York Times said the album "captures Davis’s finest working band at its apogee, straining at the limits of post-bop refinement." Thom Jurek's review on Allmusic stated "Musically, the quintet—Davis, Herbie Hancock, Wayne Shorter, Ron Carter, and Tony Williams—are firing on all cylinders throughout". In his review for Pitchfork, Hank Shteamer observed "It isn't just the best band Miles ever led, but one of the choicest small groups in jazz history... At its heart, jazz thrives on bold, sensitive interaction in the moment, and Live in Europe 1967 represents the pinnacle of that practice." PopMatters', Matthew Flander gave the album 10 out of 10 saying "no matter how many releases we get from the Davis archives, no matter how familiar you are with his mid-‘60s work, Live in Europe 1967 will surprise you."

== Track listing ==
Disc one
No.	Title	Date, Venue	Length
1.	"Agitation"	28 Oct. 1967, Koningin Elizabethzaal, Antwerp, BEL	5:26
2.	"Footprints"	28 Oct. 1967, Koningin Elizabethzaal, Antwerp, BEL	9:37
3.	"'Round Midnight"	28 Oct. 1967, Koningin Elizabethzaal, Antwerp, BEL	7:37
4.	"No Blues"	28 Oct. 1967, Koningin Elizabethzaal, Antwerp, BEL	11:15
5.	"Riot"	28 Oct. 1967, Koningin Elizabethzaal, Antwerp, BEL	3:39
6.	"On Green Dolphin Street"	28 Oct. 1967, Koningin Elizabethzaal, Antwerp, BEL	8:26
7.	"Masqualero"	28 Oct. 1967, Koningin Elizabethzaal, Antwerp, BEL	8:53
8.	"Gingerbread Boy"	28 Oct. 1967, Koningin Elizabethzaal, Antwerp, BEL	5:56
9.	"The Theme"	28 Oct. 1967, Koningin Elizabethzaal, Antwerp, BEL	1:15

Disc two
No.	Title	Date, Venue	Length
1.	"Agitation"	2 Nov. 1967, Tivoli Gardens, Copenhagen, DNK	6:14
2.	"Footprints"	2 Nov. 1967, Tivoli Gardens, Copenhagen, DNK	9:01
3.	"'Round Midnight"	2 Nov. 1967, Tivoli Gardens, Copenhagen, DNK	7:16
4.	"No Blues"	2 Nov. 1967, Tivoli Gardens, Copenhagen, DNK	14:40
5.	"Masqualero"	2 Nov. 1967, Tivoli Gardens, Copenhagen, DNK	10:00
6.	"Agitation"	6 Nov. 1967, Salle Pleyel, Paris, FRA	6:36
7.	"Footprints"	6 Nov. 1967, Salle Pleyel, Paris, FRA	10:35

Disc three
No.	Title	Date recorded	Length
1.	"'Round Midnight"	6 Nov. 1967, Salle Pleyel, Paris, FRA	8:06
2.	"No Blues"	6 Nov. 1967, Salle Pleyel, Paris, FRA	13:01
3.	"Masqualero"	6 Nov. 1967, Salle Pleyel, Paris, FRA	10:08
4.	"I Fall in Love Too Easily"	6 Nov. 1967, Salle Pleyel, Paris, FRA	10:34
5.	"Riot"	6 Nov. 1967, Salle Pleyel, Paris, FRA	3:39
6.	"Walkin'"	6 Nov. 1967, Salle Pleyel, Paris, FRA	9:01
7.	"On Green Dolphin Street"	6 Nov. 1967, Salle Pleyel, Paris, FRA	9:04
8.	"The Theme"	6 Nov. 1967, Salle Pleyel, Paris, FRA	8:22

Disc four (DVD)
No.	Title	Date, Venue	Length
1.	"Agitation"	7 Nov. 1967, Stadthalle, Karlsruhe, FRG	6:43
2.	"Footprints"	7 Nov. 1967, Stadthalle, Karlsruhe, FRG	6:03
3.	"I Fall in Love Too Easily"	7 Nov. 1967, Stadthalle, Karlsruhe, FRG	11:34
4.	"Gingerbread Boy"	7 Nov. 1967, Stadthalle, Karlsruhe, FRG	5:34
5.	"The Theme"	7 Nov. 1967, Stadthalle, Karlsruhe, FRG	0:28
6.	"Agitation"	31 Oct. 1967, Konserthuset, Stockholm, SWE	6:57
7.	"Footprints"	31 Oct. 1967, Konserthuset, Stockholm, SWE	9:06
8.	"'Round Midnight"	31 Oct. 1967, Konserthuset, Stockholm, SWE	8:31
9.	"Gingerbread Boy"	31 Oct. 1967, Konserthuset, Stockholm, SWE	7:35
10.	"The Theme"	31 Oct. 1967, Konserthuset, Stockholm, SWE	1:34

== Personnel ==
- Miles Davis – trumpet
- Wayne Shorter – tenor saxophone
- Herbie Hancock – piano
- Ron Carter – bass
- Tony Williams – drums
