= The Complete In a Silent Way Sessions =

Box set by Miles Davis
- Released: October 23, 2001
- Recorded: September 24, 1968 – February 20, 1969
- Genres: Jazz; jazz fusion; avant-garde jazz
- Length: 210:03
- Label: Columbia/Legacy
- Producers: Teo Macero, David Redfern, Seth Rothstein

The Miles Davis Series chronology
(Box 4); The Complete Studio Recordings of The Miles Davis Quintet 1965–1968 (1998)	The Complete In a Silent Way Sessions (2001)	(Box 6); The Complete Bitches Brew Sessions (1998)

Professional ratings
Review scores
Source	Rating
AllMusic	5/5 stars
AllMusic	(2004 reissue)
Pitchfork Media	(9.5/10)

The Complete In a Silent Way Sessions is a three-disc box set by trumpeter Miles Davis released by Columbia/Legacy, (Mosaic Records in conjunction with Legacy released the 5-LP set) featuring recordings from the sessions that would produce his 1969 album In a Silent Way as well as transitional pieces from the era. Beside two tracks previously released on the 1968 album Filles de Kilimanjaro, the set also includes material for the Columbia outtake compilations Water Babies, Circle in the Round, and Directions. The box set features previously unreleased music, mostly from the In a Silent Way sessions proper. The set includes essays by Michael Cuscuna and Bob Belden, along with details of the recording sessions. It is number five in the Legacy series of Miles Davis's Complete Sessions box sets.

It includes several previously unreleased tracks, namely "Splashdown," "The Ghetto Walk" and "Early Minor," as well as a longer, much different version of "Shhh/Peaceful" and two "In a Silent Way" alternate takes.

== Track listing ==
All tracks composed by Miles Davis, except where noted.

Disc one
No.	Title	Writer(s)	Original release	Length
1.	"Mademoiselle Mabry"		Filles de Kilimanjaro	16:37
2.	"Frelon Brun (Brown Hornet)"		Filles de Kilimanjaro	5:37
3.	"Two Faced"	Wayne Shorter	Water Babies	18:02
4.	"Dual Mr. Anthony Tillmon Williams Process"		Water Babies	13:20
5.	"Splash"		Circle in the Round	10:05
6.	"Splashdown"		Previously unreleased	8:03
Total length:				71:55

Disc two
No.	Title	Writer(s)	Original release	Length
1.	"Ascent"	Joe Zawinul	Directions	14:54
2.	"Directions, I"	Zawinul	Directions	6:50
3.	"Directions, II"	Zawinul	Directions	4:53
4.	"Shhh/Peaceful"		Previously unreleased unedited version	19:17
5.	"In a Silent Way (Rehearsal)"	Zawinul	Previously unreleased	5:26
6.	"In a Silent Way"	Zawinul	Previously unreleased unedited version	4:18
7.	"It's About That Time"		Previously unreleased unedited version	11:27
Total length:				67:09

Disc three
No.	Title	Writer(s)	Original release	Length
1.	"The Ghetto Walk"		Previously unreleased	26:49
2.	"Early Minor"	Zawinul	Previously unreleased	6:58
3.	"Shhh/Peaceful (LP Version)"		In a Silent Way	18:18
4.	"In a Silent Way / It's About That Time (LP Version)"	Davis; Zawinul	In a Silent Way	19:53
Total length:				71:59

== Personnel ==
=== Musicians ===
- Miles Davis – trumpet
- Wayne Shorter – tenor saxophone (Disc 1: All), soprano saxophone
- John McLaughlin – electric guitar (Disc 2: Tracks 4–7; Disc 3: All)
- Chick Corea – electric piano
- Herbie Hancock – electric piano
- Joe Zawinul – organ (Disc 2; Disc 3)
- Dave Holland – double bass
- Tony Williams – drums
- Jack DeJohnette – drums (Disc 2: Tracks 1–3)
- Joe Chambers – drums (Disc 3: Tracks 1 and 2)

== Charts ==
Chart (2001)	Peak position
French Albums (SNEP)	104

Chart (2016)	Peak position
Belgian Albums (Ultratop Flanders)	147
