= Live in Europe 1969: The Bootleg Series Vol. 2 =

Live album by Miles Davis
- Released: January 29, 2013
- Recorded: CD 1: July 25, 1969; CD 2: July 26, 1969; CD 3: November 5, 1969; DVD: November 7, 1969
- Venues: Festival Mondial du Jazz d'Antibes, La Pinède in Juan-les-Pins, France, at the Folkets Hus, Stockholm, at the Berliner Jazztage in the Berlin Philharmonie, West Germany.
- Genre: Jazz fusion
- Length: CD 1: 1:05:42; CD 2: 1:04:11; CD 3: 48:49; DVD: 45:22; Total: 3:44:04
- Label: Columbia/Legacy
- Producers: André Francis; Steve Berkowitz

Miles Davis chronology
Live in Europe 1967: The Bootleg Series Vol. 1 (2011)	Live in Europe 1969: The Bootleg Series Vol. 2 (2013)	Miles at the Fillmore - Miles Davis 1970: The Bootleg Series Vol. 3 (2014)

Miles Davis live chronology
Live in Europe 1967: The Bootleg Series Vol. 1 (1967)	Live in Europe 1969: The Bootleg Series Vol. 2 (1969)	Bitches Brew Live (1969)

Live in Europe 1969: The Bootleg Series Vol. 2 is a 3 CD + 1 DVD live album of the Miles Davis Quintet featuring saxophonist Wayne Shorter, pianist Chick Corea, bassist Dave Holland, and drummer Jack DeJohnette. This particular line-up became known as "The Miles Davis Lost Quintet" as it did not record in the studio in this configuration. The CDs contain recordings of two concerts in France and one in Sweden and the DVD has an additional concert recorded in Germany.

The first two discs were recorded at the Festival Mondial du Jazz d'Antibes, La Pinède in Juan-les-Pins, France, on July 25 & 26, 1969 with the first concert originally released in Japan in 1993 as 1969 Miles Festiva de Juan Pins. The third disc contains the concert from November 5, 1969 at the Folkets Hus, Stockholm. The DVD was recorded in West Germany on 7 November 1969 at the Berliner Jazztage in the Berlin Philharmonie.

== Repertoire ==
The sets include two jazz standards from the mid-1940s, as well as two pieces from Davis' hard bop period in the late 1950s and early 1960s, several pieces from Davis' second great quintet, and music from 1968-1969 that was included on the Bitches Brew and Directions albums.

== Reception ==
Professional ratings
Aggregate scores
Source	Rating
Metacritic	91/100
Review scores
Source	Rating
AllMusic	.
Los Angeles Times	4/5 stars
PopMatters	10/10
The Guardian	4/5 stars

Live in Europe 1969: The Bootleg Series Vol. 2 received positive reviews on release. At Metacritic, which assigns a normalised rating out of 100 to reviews from mainstream critics, the album has received a score of 91, based on 11 reviews which is categorised as universal acclaim. Thom Jurek's review on Allmusic stated "Live in Europe, 1969 makes obvious that on this tour, Davis' creative vision was holistic and completely assured. These fire-breathing performances offer a band at fever pitch hearing and playing what they knew even then was a new chapter in jazz history". In his review for the Los Angeles Times, Chris Barton observed ""Live in Europe 1969" documents the trumpeter's restless exploration at liftoff". PopMatters', Matthew Flander gave the album 10 out of 10 saying "It was as powerful a set of players as Davis ever played with, but it also did its own thing, carving out a space that was equal parts eccentric and classic, innovative and authoritative" The Guardian's John Fordham said "The intensity is somewhat relentless, and there is a warts-and-all feel to sound quality and some of the improvising, but this is newly emerging and influential music still in the furnace".

== Track listing ==
All tracks are written by Miles Davis, except as noted.

Disc One: July 25, 1969 at the Jazz à Juan festival, La Pinède in Juan-les-Pins.
No.	Title	Writer(s)	Length
1.	"Introduction by André Francis"		0:27
2.	"Directions"	Joe Zawinul	6:00
3.	"Miles Runs the Voodoo Down"		9:17
4.	"Milestones"		13:45
5.	"Footprints"	Wayne Shorter	11:44
6.	"Round Midnight"	Thelonious Monk; Cootie Williams; Bernie Hanighen	8:51
7.	"It's About That Time"	Zawinul; Davis	9:30
8.	"Sanctuary"	Shorter	4:15
9.	"The Theme"		0:53
Total length:			1:05:42

Disc Two: July 26, 1969 at the Jazz à Juan festival, La Pinède in Juan-les-Pins.
No.	Title	Writer(s)	Length
1.	"Introduction by André Francis"		0:26
2.	"Directions"	Zawinul	6:17
3.	"Spanish Key"		10:36
4.	"I Fall in Love Too Easily"	Sammy Cahn; Jule Styne	2:54
5.	"Masqualero"	Shorter	8:28
6.	"Miles Runs the Voodoo Down"		8:46
7.	"No Blues"		13:34
8.	"Nefertiti"	Shorter	8:50
9.	"Sanctuary"	Shorter	0:53
10.	"The Theme"		0:48
Total length:			1:04:11

Disc Three: November 5, 1969 at the Folkets Hus, Stockholm.
No.	Title	Writer(s)	Length
1.	"Introduction by George Wein"		0:30
2.	"Bitches Brew"		14:38
3.	"Paraphernalia"	Shorter	9:19
4.	"Nefertiti"	Shorter	10:02
5.	"Masqualero" (Incomplete)	Shorter	8:02
6.	"This"	Chick Corea	6:18
Total length:			48:49

Disc Four (DVD): November 7, 1969 at the Berliner Jazztage in the Berlin Philharmonie.
No.	Title	Writer(s)	Length
1.	"Introduction by John O'Brien-Docker"		2:07
2.	"Directions"	Zawinul	6:42
3.	"Bitches Brew"		13:39
4.	"It's About That Time"		14:09
5.	"I Fall in Love Too Easily"	Cahn; Styne	3:39
6.	"Sanctuary"	Shorter	3:55
7.	"The Theme"		1:11
Total length:			45:22

== Personnel ==
- Miles Davis – trumpet
- Wayne Shorter – tenor saxophone, soprano saxophone
- Chick Corea – electric piano, piano on disc three numbers 3,4 &5
- Dave Holland – bass
- Jack DeJohnette – drums
