= 1969 Miles: Festiva de Juan Pins =

Live album by Miles Davis
- Released: August 29, 1993 (Japan)
- Recorded: July 25, 1969
- Venue: Juan-les-Pins Festival; Juan-les-Pins, France
- Genre: Jazz; Jazz fusion
- Length: 64:00
- Label: CBS/Sony
- Producer: Teo Macero

Miles Davis chronology
| Miles & Quincy Live at Montreux (1993) | 1969 Miles: Festiva de Juan Pins (1993) | The Complete Live at the Plugged Nickel 1965 (1995) |

Miles Davis live chronology
| Bitches Brew Live (1969) | 1969 Miles: Festiva de Juan Pins (1969) | Live at the Fillmore East (1970) |

1969 Miles: Festiva de Juan Pins is a live album by Miles Davis recorded at the jazz festival in La Pinède, Juan-les-Pins, Antibes, France, as an ORTF radio broadcast.

Featuring saxophonist Wayne Shorter, pianist Chick Corea, bassist Dave Holland, and drummer Jack DeJohnette, this line-up became known as "The Miles Davis Lost Quintet" as it did not record in the studio in this configuration.

They performed twice at the Juan-les-Pins Festival, July 25 and 26. Columbia recorded both shows, but the music would not be released in its entirety until 2013. Music from this CD, which was recorded at the July 25 concert, and from the July 26 performance was included in the 2013 box set Live in Europe 1969: The Bootleg Series Vol. 2.

== Track listing ==
| No. | Title | Writer(s) | Length |
|---|---|---|---|
| 1. | "Directions" | Joe Zawinul | 6:00 |
| 2. | "Miles Runs the Voodoo Down" | Miles Davis | 9:17 |
| 3. | "Milestones" | Davis | 13:45 |
| 4. | "Footprints" | Wayne Shorter | 11:44 |
| 5. | "Round Midnight" | Thelonious Monk; Cootie Williams; Bernie Hanighen | 8:51 |
| 6. | "It's About That Time" | Zawinul; Davis | 9:30 |
| 7. | "Sanctuary/The Theme" | Shorter/Davis | 4:53 |
| Total length: | | | 1:04:00 |

== Personnel ==
The Miles Davis Quintet

- Miles Davis – trumpet
- Wayne Shorter – soprano saxophone, tenor saxophone
- Chick Corea – electric piano
- Dave Holland – bass
- Jack DeJohnette – drums

Production

- Teo Macero – producer
- Moto Uehara – product manager
- Koshin Satoh – artwork
- Hozumi Nakadaira – photography
