= Filles de Kilimanjaro =

1969 studio album by Miles Davis

Studio album by Miles Davis
- Released: February 5, 1969
- Recorded: June 19–21 and September 24, 1968
- Studio: Columbia 30th Street (New York City)
- Genres: Post-bop; jazz fusion
- Length: 56:30
- Label: Columbia
- Producer: Teo Macero

Miles Davis chronology
| Miles in the Sky (1968) | Filles de Kilimanjaro (1969) | In a Silent Way (1969) |

Filles de Kilimanjaro (French: Girls of Kilimanjaro) is a studio album by the American jazz trumpeter Miles Davis. It was recorded in June and September 1968 at Columbia 30th Street Studio in Manhattan, New York City, and released on Columbia Records in December of that year in the United Kingdom and in the United States the following February. The album is a transitional work for Davis, who was shifting stylistically from acoustic post-bop recordings with his Second Great Quintet to the jazz fusion of his subsequent "electric period". Filles de Kilimanjaro was well received by contemporary music critics, who viewed it as a significant release in modern jazz. Pianist Chick Corea and bassist Dave Holland appear on two tracks, marking their first participation on a Davis album.

== Background ==
The June sessions featured Wayne Shorter on tenor saxophone, Herbie Hancock on the electric Rhodes piano, Ron Carter on bass guitar, and Tony Williams on drums. The September sessions replaced Hancock with Chick Corea and Carter with Dave Holland. Filles de Kilimanjaro was thus the last album to feature Davis' Second Great Quintet, although all except Carter would perform on In a Silent Way. During the September sessions, Holland played acoustic double bass and Corea played an RMI electronic piano in addition to acoustic piano. These are Holland and Corea's first known recordings with Davis. The album was produced by Teo Macero and engineered by Frank Laico and Arthur Kendy. Shortly after the sessions for Filles de Kilimanjaro, Davis led further sessions in November 1968 with additional personnel including Joe Zawinul (organ) and Jack DeJohnette (drums); however, these recordings were scrapped before eventually being released on compilations throughout the 1970s and 1980s. All of these sessions were eventually included on The Complete In a Silent Way Sessions box set in 2001.

The album title refers, in part, to Kilimanjaro African Coffee, in which Davis had made a financial investment. Davis decided to list all the song titles in both French and English to give the album an "exotic" touch. Davis had married Betty Mabry in September 1968, and named the track "Mademoiselle Mabry (Miss Mabry)" for her. The song itself was recorded during the same month as Davis's wedding, and Betty appears on the album cover.

== Composition and performance ==
"Petits Machins (Little Stuff)"
Exemplifying Davis's musical transition at the time, the recording incorporates electric bass and piano, while the improvisations focus on a single tonal center.

The album can be seen as a transitional work between Davis's mainly acoustic recordings with the Second Quintet and the jazz fusion of his later electric period. Davis apparently saw it as a transitional work for him, as the album was the first in what would become a series of his releases to bear the subtitle "Directions in music by Miles Davis". However, author Paul Tingen points out that while Carter and Hancock played electric instruments at the first recording session, the later session featured Holland on acoustic bass and Corea on both acoustic and electric pianos. Davis biographer Jack Chambers later wrote that the band sought to expand beyond their usual minimal structure and find a common mood, wanting listeners to "discover the unity of the pieces instead of just locating it, as viewers must discover the unity in a painting with several simultaneous perspectives".

The melodic complexity of "Petits Machins (Little Stuff)" highlights Davis's interest in departing from post-bop structure towards the sounds and textures of his subsequent fusion work. Music writer Marcus Singletary commented on its complexity, "True to the general concept of Filles de Kilimanjaro, a mosaic of controlled chaos becomes the defining sound of 'Little Stuff'". On the recording, the quintet expresses an 11/4 meter with a repeating riff and chromatically ascending dominant harmonies in the recording first section. Section two moves to a contrasting 10-bar section in 4/4 meter, with the opening six bars relying on an F pedal point in the bass, above which occur shifting harmonies each measure. The static F pedal section yields to a syncopated progression with meters seven to eight and a change of bass in meters nine to 10, as the quintet makes an alteration to section two during the improvisations. Music theorist Keith Waters cites this as an example of "Davis's—by now—well-worn practice of metric deletion", in which throughout the trumpet solo, the quintet maintains a repeated nine-bar cycle, rather than the 10 bars of section two heard during the first section. The quintet omits bar 10 of section two during the solos and maintains the harmonic progression of bars 1 through 9. As in the first section, the syncopated progression occurs in bar 7, but Carter does not participate in playing the syncopation of meters seven to eight during the improvisations, while Hancock interprets this progression more freely. Singletary said of its musical significance:

The fact that these musicians mostly follow each other instinctively into such undefined territory is jolting. Absent of any form of actual standardization, these rare glimpses into the thought processes of geniuses validates their singular language as impossible to replicate in any way that would do this original recording justice. Though relatively brief, this track is the highlight of the album, and its significance to jazz remains tantamount. Through it, an apex of creativity in Miles's career was reached, and the track also shows why each musician here is considered an A-list innovator.

— Marcus Singletary

As with the album's title track, the quintet does not return to the first section and the recording concludes with a second Davis improvisation.

Gil Evans, with whom Davis had previously collaborated, helped compose, arrange, and produce the album, though he is not mentioned in the credits. Evans co-composed "Petits Machins", which he later recorded as "Eleven" with himself and Davis listed as co-composers. The song "Mademoiselle Mabry (Miss Mabry)", while credited to Davis, is actually Evans' reworking of "The Wind Cries Mary" by the Jimi Hendrix Experience; Davis and Evans had met with Hendrix several times to exchange ideas. Some portions of the song also resemble "On Broadway" by the Drifters.

== Critical reception ==
Professional ratings
Review scores
| Source | Rating |
|---|---|
| AllMusic | 4.5/5 stars |
| DownBeat | 5/5 stars |
| The Encyclopedia of Popular Music | 4/5 stars |
| The Penguin Guide to Jazz | 3/4 stars |
| Pitchfork | 9.2/10 |
| The Rolling Stone Album Guide | 4.5/5 stars |
| The Rolling Stone Jazz Record Guide | 5/5 stars |
| Sputnikmusic | 4.5/5 |
| Uncut | 5/5 stars |

In a contemporary review, Rolling Stone claimed that "no amount of track-by-track description here can begin to convey the beauty and intensity [of the album]. There are five songs, but really they fit together as five expressions of the same basic piece, one sustained work". Stanley Crouch, a staunch critic of Davis's use of electric instruments, described the album as Davis' "last important jazz record".

In a retrospective review of the album, Uncut called it "a masterpiece of tropical exoticism". Sputnikmusic staff writer Tyler Fisher commented that the rhythm section-players "sound entirely innovative and fresh" and "The whole band, in both quintets, has an extreme awareness about each other and knows exactly where each soloist is going". AllMusic editor Stephen Thomas Erlewine called its music "unpretentiously adventurous, grounded in driving, mildly funky rhythms and bluesy growls from Miles, graced with weird, colorful flourishes from the band," ultimately deeming it superior to its predecessor. Erlewine also cited the album as "the beginning of a new phase for Miles, the place that he begins to dive headfirst into jazz-rock fusion", and commented on its significance in Davis's catalogue:

What makes this album so fascinating is that it's possible to hear the breaking point — though his quintet all followed him into fusion (three of his supporting players were on In a Silent Way), it's possible to hear them all break with the conventional notions of what constituted even adventurous jazz, turning into something new [...] [C]ertainly the music that would spring full bloom on In a Silent Way was still in the gestation phase, and despite the rock-blues-n-funk touches here, the music doesn't fly and search the way that Nefertiti did. But that's not a bad thing — this middle ground between the adventurous bop of the mid-'60s and the fusion of the late '60s is rewarding in its own right, since it's possible to hear great musicians find the foundation of a new form.

— Stephen Thomas Erlewine

DownBeat critic John Ephland called Filles de Kilimanjaro "the stylistic precursor to the ever-popular In a Silent Way of 1969", writing that "Filles is performed (and edited) like a suite, with a sense of flow unlike anything Davis had recorded up to that point. That flow is enhanced by a music played all in one key (F), with only five 'tunes,' and with a mood and rhythms that change gradually from start to finish". Ephland concluded his review: "In passing, Filles de Kilimanjaro is a turning-point album unlike any other for Davis: For the first time, his bebop roots were essentially severed, rockier rhythms, electricity and ostinato-driven bass lines now holding sway". Jim Santella from All About Jazz wrote that the album's music "flows with a lyricism that remains highly regarded in today's format", with the review concluding that "Filles De Kilimanjaro remains one of the classic albums from their collaboration, and represents a high point in modern jazz".

== Track listing ==
All songs were credited to Miles Davis.

Side one
| No. | Title | Recording date and studio | Length |
|---|---|---|---|
| 1. | "Frelon Brun" (Brown Hornet) | September 24, 1968, Columbia 30th Street Studio | 5:39 |
| 2. | "Tout de Suite" (Right Away) | June 20, 1968, Columbia 30th Street Studio | 14:07 |
| 3. | "Petits Machins" (Little Stuff) | June 19, 1968, Columbia 30th Street Studio | 8:07 |

Side two
| No. | Title | ... | Length |
|---|---|---|---|
| 1. | "Filles de Kilimanjaro" (Girls of Kilimanjaro) | June 21, 1968, Columbia Studio B | 12:03 |
| 2. | "Mademoiselle Mabry" (Miss Mabry) | September 24, 1968, Columbia 30th Street Studio | 16:32 |

2002 reissue bonus track
| No. | Title | ... | Length |
|---|---|---|---|
| 6. | "Tout de suite" (alternate take) | June 20, 1968, Columbia 30th Street Studio | 14:36 |

== Personnel ==
- Miles Davis – trumpet
- Wayne Shorter – tenor saxophone
- Herbie Hancock – Rhodes piano (2, 3, 4)
- Chick Corea – piano, RMI Electra-Piano (1, 5)
- Ron Carter – bass guitar (2, 3, 4)
- Dave Holland – double bass (1, 5)
- Tony Williams – drums

=== Technical personnel ===
- Teo Macero – production
- Frank Laico, Arthur Kendy – engineering
- Hiro – cover art
- Gil Evans (uncredited) – co-composer, arranger, co-producer

== Bibliography ==
- Alkyer, Frank; John Ephland; Howard Mandel (2007). The Miles Davis Reader. Hal Leonard Corporation. ISBN 978-1-4234-3076-6.
- Waters, Keith (2011). The Studio Recordings of the Miles Davis Quintet, 1965–68. Oxford University Press. ISBN 978-0-19-539383-5.
