= In a Silent Way =

Studio album by Miles Davis
- Released: July 30, 1969
- Recorded: February 18, 1969
- Studio: CBS 30th Street (New York City)
- Genres: Jazz fusion; jazz rock
- Length: 38:08
- Label: Columbia
- Producer: Teo Macero

Miles Davis chronology
Filles de Kilimanjaro (1968)	In a Silent Way (1969)	Miles in Tokyo (1969)

In a Silent Way is a studio album by the American jazz trumpeter, composer, and bandleader Miles Davis, released on July 30, 1969, on Columbia Records. Produced by Teo Macero, the album was recorded in one session date on February 18, 1969, at CBS 30th Street Studio in New York City. Macero edited and arranged Davis's recordings from the session to produce the album. Marking the beginning of his "electric" period, In a Silent Way has been regarded by music writers as Davis's first fusion recording, following a stylistic shift toward the genre in his previous records and live performances.

Upon its release, the album was met by controversy among music critics, particularly those of jazz and rock music, who were divided in their reaction to its experimental musical structure and Davis's electric approach. It was nominated for the 1970 Grammy Award for Best Jazz Instrumental Album. Since its initial reception, it has been regarded by fans and critics as one of Davis's greatest and most influential works. In 2001, Columbia Legacy and Sony Music released the three-disc box set The Complete In a Silent Way Sessions, which includes additional tracks.

== Background and recording ==
By January 1969, Davis' core working band had stabilised around Wayne Shorter on soprano saxophone, Dave Holland on bass, Chick Corea on electric piano, and Jack DeJohnette on drums. For his next studio album, Davis also brought in drummer Tony Williams and keyboardist Herbie Hancock, previously members of his Second Great Quintet. In the following month, the six were joined by Austrian keyboardist Josef Zawinul and English guitarist John McLaughlin, who had been in the United States for less than two weeks to join The Tony Williams Lifetime before Davis asked him to attend the recording session. McLaughlin had been a longtime fan of Davis, and spoke with Davis of his nervousness at the prospect of recording with his idol. Among the compositions by Zawinul that Davis took a liking to was "In a Silent Way", an atmospheric piece that was titled at the suggestion of Nat Adderley while Zawinul was in the Cannonball Adderley band. Adderley wished to use the piece for his band, but Zawinul turned him down, informing him that he had already promised it to Davis.

Although Davis' live performances and recent albums Miles in the Sky and Filles de Kilimanjaro (both 1968) had indicated his stylistic shift towards jazz fusion and increasing incorporation of electric instrumentation, In a Silent Way marked a complete transition into the style, marking the beginning of his "electric" period. It was also his first recording to be constructed largely by the editing and arrangement of Davis and producer Teo Macero, whose editing techniques on In a Silent Way were informed by classical sonata form. Both tracks on the album consist of three distinct parts that could be thought of as an exposition, development, and recapitulation, with the first and third section of each track being the same piece.

In a Silent Way was assembled from various takes from a three-hour session on February 18, 1969, at CBS 30th Street Studio's Studio B in Manhattan. "Shhh/Peaceful" was composed solely by Davis, while the opening and closing section to "In a Silent Way/It's About That Time" is based on Zawinul's "In a Silent Way", which he would record in its original form in 1970 for his third solo album, Zawinul (1971). After Zawinul presented the tune to the group, it was rehearsed as it was originally written, but Davis wished for it to sound more rock-oriented and stripped the various chord changes to leave a more basic melody built around a pedal point. McLaughlin had some difficulty playing in the manner Davis wished of him, but found his way after the trumpeter suggested he play the guitar as if he were a novice. Davis believed that Zawinul was never happy with his adaptation of "In a Silent Way", but felt that the album would have been less successful had its original arrangement been kept. Zawinul had expressed some dislike of Davis' arrangement, in particular of two chords that he believed that Davis was wrong to remove. Zawinul claimed that he was responsible for the melodic bass line and descending melody of "It's About That Time" but was not credited; he blamed Macero for this, as he "always put things together so that it came out as if Miles had written it."

Two days after the February 18 session, Davis returned to the studio and recorded "Ghetto Walk" with drummer Joe Chambers. "Ghetto Walk" was intended to be included on In a Silent Way with "Shhh/Peaceful", but it was later swapped for "In a Silent Way/It's About That Time". The group also played through "Early Minor", another Zawinul piece, on February 20, but it too was scrapped.

== Release ==
In a Silent Way was originally released on July 30, 1969.

In 2001, Columbia/Legacy released the three-disc box set The Complete In a Silent Way Sessions, which includes the original album, two tracks from Filles de Kilimanjaro, additional unreleased tracks, and the unedited takes utilized for production purposes.

In 2002, Sony Music released a 5.1 surround sound mix of the album, produced by Bob Belden and engineered by Mark Wilder.

== Reception ==
Retrospective professional reviews
Review scores
Source	Rating
AllMusic	5/5 stars
The Encyclopedia of Popular Music	5/5 stars
Musichound Jazz	5/5 stars
The Penguin Guide to Jazz	4/4 stars
Pitchfork	9.5/10
The Rolling Stone Album Guide	5/5 stars
The Rolling Stone Jazz Record Guide	5/5 stars
Uncut	4/5 stars

Peaking at number 134 on the U.S. Billboard Top LPs chart, In a Silent Way became Davis's first album since My Funny Valentine in 1965 to reach the chart. While it performed better commercially than most of his previous work, critics were divided in their reaction to the album upon its release. The album's incorporation of electric instrumentation and tape editing became sources of controversy among jazz critics. According to The Rolling Stone Album Guide (1992), Davis' recording process and producer Teo Macero's studio editing of individual recordings into separate tracks for the album "seemed near heretical by jazz standards". In his book Running the Voodoo Down: The Electric Music of Miles Davis, Phil Freeman writes of critical response to the album: "Rock critics thought In a Silent Way sounded like rock, or at least thought Miles was nodding in their direction, and practically wet themselves with joy. Jazz critics, especially ones who didn't listen to much rock, thought it sounded like rock too, and they reacted less favorably". Freeman continues by expressing that both reactions were "rooted, at least partly, in the critic's paranoia about his place in the world", writing that rock criticism was in its early stage of existence and such critics found "reassurance" in viewing the album as having psychedelic rock elements, while jazz critics felt "betrayed" amid the genre's decreasing popularity at the time.

"It didn't swing, the solos weren't even a little bit heroic, and it had electric guitars... But though In a Silent Way wasn't exactly jazz, it certainly wasn't rock. It was the sound of Miles Davis and Teo Macero feeling their way down an unlit hall at three in the morning. It was the soundtrack to all the whispered conversations every creative artist has, all the time, with that doubting, taunting voice that lives in the back of your head, the one asking all the unanswerable questions."

— Phil Freeman

In a rave review, Rolling Stone rock critic Lester Bangs described In a Silent Way as "the kind of album that gives you faith in the future of music. It is not rock and roll, but it's nothing stereotyped as jazz either. All at once, it owes almost as much to the techniques developed by rock improvisors in the last four years as to Davis' jazz background. It is part of a transcendental new music which flushes categories away and, while using musical devices from all styles and cultures, is defined mainly by its deep emotion and unaffected originality". Davis' next fusion album, Bitches Brew, showed him moving even further into the area that lay between the genres of rock and jazz. The dark, fractured dissonance of Bitches Brew ultimately proved to be instrumental in its success; it far outsold In a Silent Way.

In a Silent Way has been retrospectively regarded by fans and critics as one of Davis' best albums. In a retrospective review, Blender writer K. Leander Williams called it "a proto-ambient masterpiece". Citing it as "one of Davis's greatest achievements", Chip O'Brien of PopMatters viewed that producer Teo Macero's studio editing on the album helped Davis "embrace the marriage of music and technology". In regards to its musical significance, O'Brien wrote that In a Silent Way "transcends labels", writing "It is neither jazz nor rock. It isn't what will eventually become known as fusion, either. It is something altogether different, something universal. There is a beautiful resignation in the sounds of this album, as if Davis is willingly letting go of what has come before, of his early years with Charlie Parker, with John Coltrane and Cannonball Adderley, of his early '60s work, and is embracing the future, not only of jazz, but of music itself". Stylus Magazine writer Nick Southall called the album "timeless" and wrote of its influence on music, stating "The fresh modes of constructing music that it presented revolutionised the jazz community, and the shifting, ethereal beauty of the actual music contained within has remained beautiful and wonderful, its echoes heard through the last 30 years, touching dance music, electronica, rock, pop, all music". The Penguin Guide to Jazz has included In a Silent Way in its suggested "Core Collection". The album was also included in the 2005 book 1001 Albums You Must Hear Before You Die.

== Track listing ==
Side one
No.	Title	Writer(s)	Length
1.	"Shhh"/"Peaceful"	Miles Davis	18:16

- "Shhh" – 6:14
- "Peaceful" – 5:42
- "Shhh" – 6:20

Side two
No.	Title	Writer(s)	Length
2.	"In a Silent Way"/"It's About That Time"	Joe Zawinul ("In a Silent Way"), Davis ("It's About That Time")	19:52

- "In a Silent Way" – 4:11
- "It's About That Time" – 11:27
- "In a Silent Way" – 4:14

== Personnel ==
Credits are adapted from the album's 1969 liner notes.

=== Musicians ===
- Miles Davis – trumpet
- Wayne Shorter – soprano saxophone
- John McLaughlin – electric guitar
- Chick Corea – electric piano
- Herbie Hancock – electric piano
- Joe Zawinul – electric piano, organ
- Dave Holland – double bass
- Tony Williams – drums

=== Production ===
- Teo Macero – producer
- Stan Tonkel – engineer
- Russ Payne – engineer
- Lee Friedlander – cover photo
- John G. Walter – back cover photography
- Frank Glenn – back cover notes

== Charts ==
Chart performance for In a Silent Way
Chart (1969)	Peak position<
US Billboard 200	134
US Top Jazz Albums (Billboard)	3
US Top R&B/Hip-Hop Albums (Billboard)	40

Chart (2024)	Peak position
Croatian International Albums (HDU)	30
