= 502 Blues =

Jazz standard by Jimmy Rowles

502 Blues is a jazz standard composed in 1958 by Jimmy Rowles. The composition is best known through Wayne Shorter's rendition on his 1967 album, Adam's Apple.

== Musical composition ==
The song is a 32-bar waltz in A minor.

Form of 502 Blues
A-7	D♭Δ7	Bø7	E7♯9
A-7	D♭Δ7	Bø7	E7♯9
C-7	F7	B♭Δ7	A♭-7 D♭7
First ending
F♯ø7	B7♭9	EΔ7♯5	EΔ7♯5 E7
Second ending
F♯ø7	B7♭9	E-7	E-7

== Notable recordings ==
- Bill Holman - Mel Lewis Quintet in "Jive for Five (1959)"
- Wayne Shorter in "Adam's Apple (1967)"
- Harold Danko Trio in "Three of Four (1998)"
- Michael Cochrane, Bob Malach, Calvin Hill, and Jeff Hirshfield in "Quartet Music (2001)"
- Jeremy Pelt in "Close to My Heart (2003)"
