= Live at the Fillmore East, March 7, 1970: It's About That Time =

Live at the Fillmore East

Live album by Miles Davis
- Released: July 17, 2001
- Recorded: March 7, 1970
- Venues: Fillmore East auditorium New York City
- Genres: jazz-rock; jazz-funk
- Length: 90:13
- Label: Columbia/Legacy
- Producer: Teo Macero

Miles Davis chronology
The Essential Miles Davis (2001)	Live at the Fillmore East (2001)	Birdland 1951 (2004)

Miles Davis live chronology
1969 Miles: Festiva de Juan Pins (1969)	Live at the Fillmore East (1970)	Black Beauty: Miles Davis at Fillmore West (1970)

Professional ratings
Review scores
Source	Rating
AllMusic	link
Robert Christgau	link
DownBeat	July 2001
The Penguin Guide to Jazz	8th Ed.
Pitchfork Media	9.5/10 link

Live at the Fillmore East March 7, 1970: It's About That Time is a live double album by Miles Davis recording two sets performed on March 7, 1970 and released by Columbia/Legacy in 2001, although the concert had previously circulated as a bootleg recording.

Live at the Fillmore East records the final concert with saxophonist Wayne Shorter in Davis' band. At the same time, it is one of the first recordings (along with the 1969 Miles: Festiva de Juan Pins) to document Davis' use of electric instruments in a concert setting. Davis performed on the nights of March 6 and 7 at Fillmore East; Columbia Records recorded both nights' concerts, but as of 2008 has only released the March 7 show. A number of the compositions performed during the concert appear on Bitches Brew, which had not yet been released at the time of this concert.

These performances were as support to Neil Young and Crazy Horse and the Steve Miller Band. Parts of Young's performance have also been released as a live album.

== Track listing ==
All tracks are written by Miles Davis unless otherwise indicated.

Disc one: first set
No.	Title	Writer(s)	Length
1.	"Directions"	Joe Zawinul	8:44
2.	"Spanish Key"		11:16
3.	"Masqualero"	Wayne Shorter	9:57
4.	"It's About That Time/The Theme"		14:03

Disc two: second set
No.	Title	Writer(s)	Length
1.	"Directions"	Zawinul	10:14
2.	"Miles Runs the Voodoo Down"		7:40
3.	"Bitches Brew"		8:02
4.	"Spanish Key"		8:33
5.	"It's About That Time/Willie Nelson/The Theme"		11:42

== Personnel ==
Musicians

- Miles Davis – trumpet
- Wayne Shorter – soprano and tenor saxophone
- Chick Corea – Fender Rhodes electric piano
- Dave Holland – acoustic and electric bass
- Jack DeJohnette – drums
- Airto Moreira – percussion, cuica

Production

- Original Recordings Produced by Teo Macero
- Concert Produced by Bill Graham
- Produced for Release by Bob Belden
- Recorded by Stan Tonkel
- Mixed by Richard King
- Mastered by Mark Wilder, Seth Foster
- Art direction: Howard Fritzson
- Design: Alice Butts
- Cover photo: Amalie R. Rothschild

== Charting history ==
Chart	Peak chart position
Billboard Top Jazz Albums	3
