= Marcus Singletary =

American musician and media personality

- Marcus Singletary

Background information
- Born: Chicago, Illinois, United States
- Genres: Rock, progressive rock, jazz, jazz fusion
- Occupations: Musician, producer, songwriter, singer, radio personality, author
- Instruments: Bass guitar, guitar, electric guitar, drums, piano
- Years active: 2000–present
- Website: www.marcussingletary.com

Marcus Singletary is an American media personality and musician. A prolific entertainer, he has released many albums as a solo artist, and appeared on several radio and television programs.

== Education ==
Singletary studied jazz guitar and audio engineering at Musicians Institute, and is a graduate of Northwestern University's School of Communication.

== Influences ==
In a 2025 Q&A, Singletary revealed that his early influences included the Rolling Stones, Steppenwolf, and Queen. After a period of immersing himself in jazz music, he later became heavily inspired by the works of John Abercrombie, Larry Coryell, Eric Dolphy, Grant Green, Freddie Hubbard, Jim Hall, and Allan Holdsworth.

== Music ==
Singletary was born in Chicago, Illinois. He began playing several instruments from an early age, and later described the era as one spent listening to classic rock radio and hanging out at a local record shop.

A unique blend of styles have been apparent within Singletary's recording career. Take Me Out to the Ball Game (2008), which consisted largely of improvisational guitar solos, was compared, by critics, to legends like Jimi Hendrix, the Rocks compilation (2006) was a "recorded blues resume" containing early cuts and highlights, and Smokin' (2011) paired him with a powerhouse backing band including Chet McCracken, a Grammy nominee and former member of Rock and Roll Hall of Fame band The Doobie Brothers, on drums. Others, including Defiance Science (2015) and Subversive Blues (2016), were displays of his talents on all instruments.

In reference to his work as a songwriter, he said, "The characters I write about represent different aspects of real people. They make their choices, live with their decisions, and find inspiration in the aftermath."

Singletary formed the independent record label Aviation Records in 2006. The label was awarded a California small business grant by Governor Gavin Newsom and the State Legislature in February 2021.

An article published in Illinois Entertainer cited Marcus Singletary as an early pioneer within the home recording revolution of the 2000s.

== Multimedia Work ==
Marcus Singletary interviews and performances have aired on television networks including CBS, CNN, and FOX. As an author, he has contributed to such publications as Examiner and Guitar 9.

He hosted the radio program Far Out Flavors in 2016; it was broadcast on Southern California NBC affiliate KCAA-FM. Highlights were featured on the 2017 EP Daydream Station.

Marcus Singletary has voiced radio advertisements for companies including Disc Makers, Carrie's Barbecue Restaurant, and BandsOnABudget.com. He produced and scored the 2019 experimental short film The Sebhedris Experience. It combined kaleidoscopic images with ambient music from the instrumental soundtrack Journey to Sebhedris.

== Discography ==
Studio albums

- The Marcus Singletary Band (2004)
- Capitol Hill (2004)
- Marcus Singletary (2008)
- Smokin' (2011)
- Defiance Science (2015)
- Subversive Blues (2016)
- Born to Be Wild (2020)
- The Breakaway (2023)
- Here in the USA, You Found Your Way (2023)
- Singletary Steps Out (2024)
- Crazy Cosmic Coldblooded World (2024)
- XII (2025)

EPs

- Sings Country Music Standards (2012)
- Spirit Dialogues (2017)
- Daydream Station (2018)
- Power Player (2021)

Instructional

- Advanced Guitar For All Ages (2023)

Soundtrack albums

- Journey to Sebhedris (2019)

Compilations

- Rocks (2006)
- In the Mix (2018)
- My Gun's My Guitar (2019)
- The Complete Aviation Studio Albums (2004-2020) (2021)
- Start Something (2022)
- Early Works (2022)
- Life Was Never Better Than It Is Right Now (2023)
- Grit, Guts, & Guitars: The Best of Marcus Singletary (2024)

Live albums

- Live at the Foxx (2005)
- Live on Sunset (2006)
- Take Me Out to the Ball Game (2008)
- Marcus Singletary Live (2015)
- The Sonic Admiral - Live! (2018)
