= Miles in the Sky =

1968 studio album by Miles Davis

Studio album by Miles Davis
- Released: July 22, 1968
- Recorded: January 16 and May 15–17, 1968
- Studio: Columbia 52nd Street (New York City)
- Genres: Post-bop; jazz fusion; jazz rock
- Length: 50:56
- Label: Columbia
- Producer: Teo Macero

Miles Davis chronology
Nefertiti (1968)	Miles in the Sky (1968)	Filles de Kilimanjaro (1969)

Miles in the Sky is a studio album by the jazz trumpeter and composer Miles Davis. It was released on July 22, 1968, through Columbia Records. It was the last full album recorded by Davis' "Second Great Quintet" and marked the beginning of his foray into jazz fusion, with Herbie Hancock playing electric piano and Ron Carter playing electric bass guitar on opening track "Stuff". Additionally, electric guitarist George Benson features on "Paraphernalia".

== Background ==
Miles in the Sky was produced by Teo Macero and recorded at Columbia Studio B in New York City on January 16, 1968, and May 15–17, 1968. The album's title was a nod to the Beatles' 1967 song "Lucy in the Sky with Diamonds". This is the final appearance of tenor saxophonist Wayne Shorter, pianist Herbie Hancock, bassist Ron Carter and drummer Tony Williams together on a full-length studio album in Davis’ discography.

== Composition ==
For Miles in the Sky, Davis and his quintet pulled further away from conventional jazz and more toward jazz-rock fusion. The album's compositions are extended and groove-oriented, often with rhythms that, according to Stephen Thomas Erlewine, "are straightforward, picking up on the direct 4/4 beats of rock, and these are illuminated by Herbie Hancock's electric piano". In the opinion of All About Jazz's C. Michael Bailey, Miles in the Sky was one of six albums by Davis' quintet between 1965 and 1968 that introduced the poorly defined jazz subgenre post-bop.

== Critical reception ==
Professional ratings
Review scores
Source	Rating
AllMusic	3.5/5 stars
DownBeat	4.5/5 stars
The Encyclopedia of Popular Music	3/5 stars
The Penguin Guide to Jazz Recordings	3/4 stars
The Rolling Stone Album Guide	3.5/5 stars
Rolling Stone Jazz Record Guide	4/5 stars
Sputnikmusic	4/5

In a contemporary review, DownBeat called Miles in the Sky one of the best albums by Davis and his second quintet because of how it shows he had been influenced by Ornette Coleman and John Coltrane: "even as Miles denies it, for their assault on the popular song has pushed Miles along the only path that seems open to him, an increasingly ironic detachment from sentiment and prettiness".

In a retrospective review for AllMusic, Erlewine found it less adventurous than Nefertiti (1968): "Intriguing, successful jams in many respects, but ... this is less visionary than its predecessor and feels like a transitional album – and, like many transitional albums, it's intriguing and frustrating in equal measures." Hernan M. Campbell of Sputnikmusic was more enthusiastic and praised the musicianship throughout, particularly that of Williams, whose drumming he found "mind-blowing". Campbell felt that Miles in the Sky should not be overlooked because it marked the beginning of Davis' electric period and was one of the defining jazz fusion albums.

The album was nominated for a Grammy Award: Best Instrumental Jazz Performance, Small Group or Soloist with Small Group.

== Track listing ==
Columbia – CS 9628

Side one
No.	Title	Writer(s)	Recording session	Length
1.	"Stuff"	Miles Davis	May 17, 1968	17:00
2.	"Paraphernalia"	Wayne Shorter	January 16, 1968	12:38

Side two
No.	Title	Writer(s)	Recording session	Length
3.	"Black Comedy"	Tony Williams	May 16, 1968	7:26
4.	"Country Son"	Miles Davis	May 15, 1968	13:52
Total length:				50:56

CD Reissue (Columbia – CK 65684)
No.	Title	Writer(s)	Recording session	Length
5.	"Black Comedy" (Alternate Take)	Tony Williams	May 16, 1968	6:23
6.	"Country Son" (Alternate Take)	Miles Davis	May 15, 1968	14:38
Total length:				1:11:57

== Personnel ==
- Miles Davis – trumpet, cornet on "Stuff" and "Country Son"
- Wayne Shorter – tenor saxophone
- Herbie Hancock – piano, electric piano on "Stuff"
- Ron Carter – bass, electric bass on "Stuff"
- Tony Williams – drums
- George Benson – electric guitar on "Paraphernalia"
