= Nefertiti (Miles Davis album) =

1968 studio album by Miles Davis

Studio album by Miles Davis
- Released: March 1968
- Recorded: June 7 – July 19, 1967
- Studios: Columbia 30th Street Studio, New York City
- Genre: Post-bop
- Length: 39:08
- Label: Columbia
- Producers: Teo Macero, Howard Roberts

Miles Davis chronology
Sorcerer (1967)	Nefertiti (1968)	Miles in the Sky (1968)

Nefertiti is an album by the American jazz musician Miles Davis, released in March 1968 by Columbia Records. It was recorded at Columbia's 30th Street Studio over four dates between June 7 and July 19, 1967, and was Davis's last fully acoustic album. Davis himself did not contribute any compositions to the album; three of the six tracks are by tenor saxophonist Wayne Shorter, two by pianist Herbie Hancock, and one by drummer Tony Williams.

== Music ==
The fourth album by Miles Davis's "Second Great Quintet", Nefertiti is best known for the unusual title track, on which the horn section repeats the melody numerous times without individual solos while the rhythm section improvises underneath, reversing the traditional role of a rhythm section. C. Michael Bailey of All About Jazz cited it as one of the quintet's six albums between 1965 and 1968 that introduced post-bop.

Shortly after this album, Hancock recorded a different version of "Riot" for his 1968 album Speak Like a Child. In 1978, Shorter recorded a new version of "Pinocchio" with Weather Report for the album Mr. Gone.

This album, along with others by this particular group, demonstrates their willingness to fundamentally alter the basics of a composition during the recording process. For example, the quintet initially rehearsed "Madness" as a slow waltz. On the next two takes (including the released version) it is rendered at a fast tempo in predominantly 4/4 time. Similarly, "Pinocchio" is a relatively fast composition on the released version and yet the group rehearsed it at a much slower pace, with the horns repeating the head whilst the rhythm section improvises underneath, in a similar manner to the title track.

Nefertiti was the final all-acoustic album of Davis' career. Starting with his next album, Miles in the Sky, Davis began to experiment with electric instruments, marking the dawn of his electric period.

== Critical reception ==
Professional ratings
Review scores
Source	Rating
AllMusic	5/5 stars
Robert Christgau	A−
DownBeat	4/5 stars
The Encyclopedia of Popular Music	3/5 stars
The Penguin Guide to Jazz Recordings	3.5/4 stars
Q	5/5 stars
The Rolling Stone Album Guide	5/5 stars
The Rolling Stone Jazz Record Guide	5/5 stars
Tom Hull	A−

Nefertiti has been received positively by critics. DownBeat writer Howard Mandel said it "seems perched on the cusp" of innovation, with "perfectly pitched" performances and trumpet ideas marked by "cyclical melodies, subdued in mood and sonically bejeweled", but lamented that the solos "revert to regular rhythms", limiting the music from more transcendent possibilities. Robert Christgau considered it among the "great work" Davis recorded with his quintet of the 1960s, although he later called the Second Great Quintet "my least favorite Miles—not that I think it's bad, but I've always found [Wayne] Shorter too cool." Stephen Thomas Erlewine of AllMusic was more enthusiastic about its relatively subtler "charms" while finding it a clear forerunner to the jazz fusion that followed: "What's impressive, like on all of this quintet's sessions, is the interplay, how the musicians follow an unpredictable path as a unit, turning in music that is always searching, always provocative, and never boring."

== Track listing ==
Columbia – CS 9594

Side one
No.	Title	Writer(s)	Recording session	Length
1.	"Nefertiti"	Wayne Shorter	June 7, 1967	7:52
2.	"Fall"	Wayne Shorter	July 19, 1967	6:39
3.	"Hand Jive"	Tony Williams	June 22, 1967	8:54

Side two
No.	Title	Writer(s)	Recording session	Length
1.	"Madness"	Herbie Hancock	June 23, 1967	7:31
2.	"Riot"	Herbie Hancock	July 19, 1967	3:04
3.	"Pinocchio"	Wayne Shorter	July 19, 1967	5:08
Total length:				39:08

- Sides one and two were combined as tracks 1–6 on CD reissues.

CD Reissue (Columbia – CS 9594)
No.	Title	Writer(s)	Recording session	Length
7.	"Hand Jive" (First Alternate Take)	Tony Williams	June 22, 1967	6:50
8.	"Hand Jive" (Second Alternate Take)	Tony Williams	June 22, 1967	8:17
9.	"Madness" (Alternate Take)	Herbie Hancock	June 23, 1967	6:45
10.	"Pinocchio" (Alternate Take)	Wayne Shorter	July 19, 1967	5:08
Total length:				1:06:08

== Personnel ==
The Miles Davis Quintet

- Miles Davis – trumpet
- Wayne Shorter – tenor saxophone
- Herbie Hancock – piano
- Ron Carter – double bass
- Tony Williams – drums

Production

- Teo Macero – producer
- Howard Roberts – producer
- Fred Plaut, Ray Moore – engineering
- Rob Schwarz – mastering

== Chart history ==
Billboard Music Charts (North America) – Nefertiti

- 1968: Top Jazz Albums – No. 8
