= Footprints (composition) =

1966 musical work by Wayne Shorter

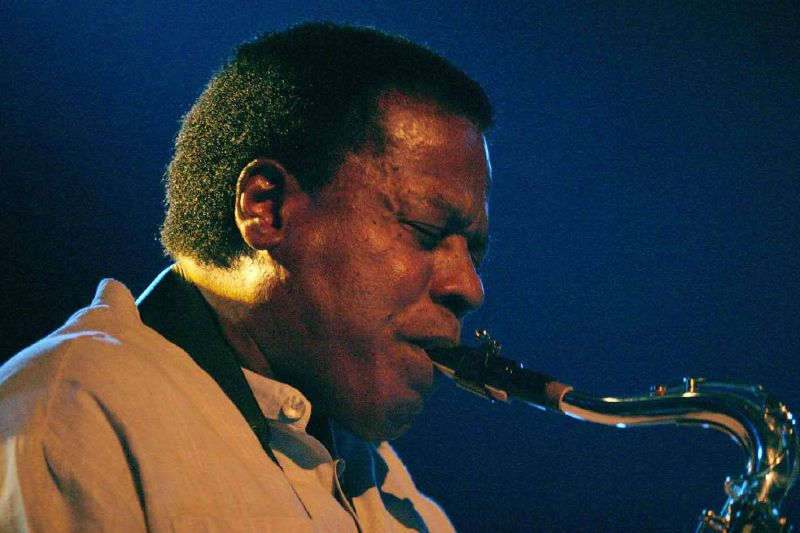
Wayne Shorter in 2006

"Footprints" is a jazz standard composed by saxophonist Wayne Shorter and first recorded for his album Adam's Apple in 1966. The first commercial release of the song was a different recording on the Miles Davis album Miles Smiles recorded later in 1966, but released earlier. It has become a jazz standard.

== Rhythm ==
Although often written in 3/4 or 6/8, it is not a jazz waltz because the feel alternates between simple meter and compound meter. On Miles Smiles, the band playfully explores the correlation between African-based 12/8 (or 6/8) and 4/4. Drummer Tony Williams freely moves from swing, to the three-over-two cross rhythm—and to its 4/4 correlative.

The ground of four main beats is maintained throughout the piece. The bass switches to 4/4 at 2:20. Ron Carter’s 4/4 figure is known as tresillo in Afro-Cuban music and is the duple-pulse correlative of the 12/8 figure. This may have been the first overt expression of systemic, African-based cross-rhythm used by a straight ahead jazz group. During Davis’s first trumpet solo, Williams shifts to a 4/4 jazz ride pattern while Carter continues the 12/8 bass line.

The following example shows the 12/8 and 4/4 forms of the bass line. The slashed noteheads indicate the main beats (not bass notes), where one ordinarily taps their foot to "keep time."

== Harmony ==
Harmonically, "Footprints" takes the form of a 12-bar C minor blues, but this is masked not only by its triple time signature but by its avant garde turnaround. In the key of C minor, a normal turnaround would be Dm^{7(♭5)}, G^{7}, Cm^{7}. But Shorter doubles the harmonic rhythm of the turnaround, and the progression reads: F♯m^{9(♭5)}, F^{7(♯11)}, E^{9(♭5)}, A^{7(♯9)}, Cm^{7}. In jazz jam sessions and for educational purposes, players often choose D^{7(♯11)} D♭^{7(♯11)} Cm^{7} as turnaround, which also fits with the original melody.

== Notable covers ==
- Kenny Barron included the composition in his 2004 studio album Images.
