= Post-bop =

Genre of small-combo jazz

Post-bop is a jazz term with several possible definitions and usages. It has been variously defined as a musical period, a musical genre, a musical style, and a body of music, sometimes in different chronological periods, depending on the writer. Musicologist Barry Kernfeld wrote in The New Grove Dictionary of Music and Musicians that post-bop is "a vague term, used either stylistically or chronologically (with divergent results) to describe any continuation or amalgamation of bop, modal jazz, and free jazz; its meaning sometimes extends into swing and earlier styles or into fusion and third stream styles."

== Definitions and uses ==
The term post-bop has a variety of usages which vary widely. Jazz historian Stuart Nicholson wrote that "The term post-bop is a wonderful catch-all, used not so much to describe what a style of music is, but more what it isn't. Post-bop isn't free or fusion or hard-bop or modal or avant-garde." Some writers have defined post-bop with specificity, but these sources conflict with one another. One potential definition of post-bop is a musical period in which modern jazz was at its greatest mainstream popularity extending from the mid-1950s through to the mid-1960s. Others have written that post-bop is not a musical period but a specific body of music that emerged in the late 1950s and 1960s that combined principles of bebop, hard bop, modal jazz, avant-garde and free jazz, but also departed from earlier traditions in jazz.

Still other writers have defined post-bop as a genre of small-combo jazz that evolved in the early to mid 1960s in the United States that was pioneered by Miles Davis (the central figure in the development of this genre), in conjunction with Charles Mingus, Wayne Shorter, Herbie Hancock, John Coltrane and Jackie McLean, which crafted syntheses of hard bop with contemporaneous developments in avant-garde jazz, modal jazz and free jazz that resulted in music with a complex and experimental flavor though still rooted in bop tradition, featuring less of the blues and soul leanings predominant in hard bop. The movement had a significant impact on subsequent generations of both acoustic jazz and fusion musicians.

According to musicologist Jeremy Yudkin, post-bop does not follow "the conventions of bop or the apparently formless freedom of the new jazz". He wrote in his definition of the subgenre:

Forms, tempos, and meters are freer, all the compositions are new, and the band members themselves are featured composers.... [A]n approach that is abstract and intense in the extreme, with space created for rhythmic and coloristic independence of the drummer—an approach that incorporated modal and chordal harmonies, flexible form, structured choruses, melodic variation, and free improvisation."

According to scholar Keith Waters, some of the traits found in post-bop recordings are: a slower harmonic rhythm characteristic of modal jazz, techniques for playing "inside" and "outside" the underlying harmonic structure, an interactive (or conversational) approach to rhythm section accompaniment, unusual harmonic progressions, use of harmonic or metric superimposition, unusual underlying formal designs for head statements and chorus structure improvisation, or the abandonment entirely of underlying chorus structure beneath improvisation.

Miles Davis was particularly influential in the development of small-combo jazz post-bop in the 1960s. His second quintet was active during 1964 to 1968 and featured pianist Herbie Hancock, bassist Ron Carter, saxophonist Wayne Shorter, and drummer Tony Williams. They recorded six studio albums that, according to All About Jazz's C. Michael Bailey, introduced post-bop: E.S.P. (1965), Miles Smiles (1967), Sorcerer (1967), Nefertiti (1968), Miles in the Sky (1968), and Filles de Kilimanjaro (1968).

== See also ==
- Category:Post-bop jazz musicians

== Bibliography ==
- Yudkin, Jeremy (2007). Miles Davis, Miles Smiles, and the Invention of Post Bop. Indiana University Press. p. 125. ISBN 9780253027818.
