= The Legendary Prestige Quintet Sessions =

Box set by Miles Davis
- Released: May 23, 2006
- Recorded: November 16, 1955; May 11, 1956; October 26, 1956
- Genre: Jazz
- Label: Concord Music Group

Professional ratings
Review scores
Source	Rating
AllMusic	4/5 stars

The Legendary Prestige Quintet Sessions is a four compact disc box set of recordings by the Miles Davis Quintet released in 2006 by the Concord Music Group. It collates on three discs the entire set of recordings that made up the Prestige Records albums released from 1956 through 1961 — Miles, Cookin', Relaxin', Workin', and Steamin'. The track "'Round Midnight" was released on the album Miles Davis and the Modern Jazz Giants. The fourth disc contains live material from a television broadcast and in jazz club settings. It peaked at #15 on the Billboard jazz album chart, and was reissued on December 2, 2016, in a smaller compact disc brick packaging.

In 2019 Craft Recordings, an imprint of the Concord group of labels, released a 32-track version without the fourth disc of live recordings subsequent to the main body of studio recordings in digital hi-res format. It is also available in a set of six vinyl LPs from Craft Recordings in the original 42-track format.

== Background ==
In the summer of 1955, Davis performed a noted set at the Newport Jazz Festival, and had been approached by Columbia Records executive George Avakian, offering a contract with the label if he could form a regular band. Davis assembled his first regular quintet to meet a commitment at the Café Bohemia in July with Sonny Rollins on tenor saxophone, Red Garland on piano, Paul Chambers on bass, and Philly Joe Jones on drums. By the autumn Rollins had left, and at the recommendation of Jones, Davis replaced Rollins with John Coltrane.

In January 1951, Prestige Records owner and producer Bob Weinstock had signed Davis to a one-year contract; Davis would continue to record for the label into 1956. Weinstock gave Davis an advance of $750, but the company's artists' contracts were often manipulative with low royalties, paying nothing for rehearsal time. With his success at Newport and the formation of the Miles Davis Quintet, Davis convinced Avakian to buy out his contract with Prestige.

The terms of the deal between Avakian and Weinstock allowed Davis to record for Columbia but not release any of the material until Davis fulfilled his remaining duty to Prestige. Davis took the quintet into the studio for a session in 1955 followed by two marathon dates in 1956, meeting his contractual obligations efficiently. Prestige released the results of the first date for the album Miles in 1956, his second specifically for the twelve-inch LP format.

== Content ==
Recording sessions took place at the studio of Rudy Van Gelder in Hackensack, New Jersey, three over a twelve-month period 1955 to 1956. Discs one, two, and three contain selections in the order they were taped, all five Prestige LPs assembled from this material. The songs were mostly pop standards, mixed with jazz standards that would have been commonly played by hard bop groups during the 1950s. Disc one, tracks one through six, were recorded on November 16, 1955; disc one, tracks seven through ten, and disc two, tracks one through ten, were recorded on May 11, 1956; and disc two, tracks eleven and twelve, and disc three were recorded on October 26, 1956.

Disc four contains previously unreleased live performances. Tracks one through four are from the first iteration of The Tonight Show, taped on November 17, 1955, the day after the first studio session. Tracks five and six derive from a radio broadcast at the now-defunct Blue Note club in Philadelphia on December 8, 1956. Tracks seven through ten derive from a show at the also defunct Café Bohemia in New York City on May 17, 1958, with Bill Evans in place of Garland. The show was broadcast on the Bandstand USA radio program.

The liner notes, by Bob Blumenthal, include the oft-quoted and now seen as ironic assessment from another set of liner notes of the quintet's capabilities:

...many listeners initially felt that the group was comprised of a 'trumpet player who could play only in the middle register and fluffed half his notes; an out-of-tune tenor player; a cocktail pianist; a drummer who played so loud that no one else could be heard; and a teenage bassist.'

== Track listing ==
All tracks recorded at Van Gelder Studio.

=== Disc one ===
No.	Title	Writer(s)	Recording date	Length
1.	"Stablemates" (originally released on Miles)	Benny Golson	16 November 1955	4:51
2.	"How Am I to Know?" (originally released on Miles)	Dorothy Parker, Jack King	16 November 1955	4:38
3.	"Just Squeeze Me" (originally released on Miles)	Duke Ellington, Lee Gaines	16 November 1955	6:31
4.	"There Is No Greater Love" (originally released on Miles)	Isham Jones, Marty Symes	16 November 1955	5:18
5.	"The Theme" (originally released on Miles)	Miles Davis	16 November 1955	5:45
6.	"S'posin'" (originally released on Miles)	Paul Denniker, Andy Razaf	16 November 1955	6:09
7.	"In Your Own Sweet Way" (originally released on Workin' )	Dave Brubeck	11 May 1956	5:42
8.	"Diane" (originally released on Steamin' )	Lew Pollack, Erno Rapee	11 May 1956	7:49
9.	"Trane's Blues" (originally released on Workin' )	John Coltrane	11 May 1956	8:33
10.	"Something I Dreamed Last Night" (originally released on Steamin' )	Sammy Fain, Jack Yellen, Herbert Magidson	11 May 1956	6:13

=== Disc two ===
No.	Title	Writer(s)	Recording date	Length
1.	"It Could Happen to You" (originally released on Relaxin' )	Johnny Burke, Jimmy Van Heusen	11 May 1956	6:37
2.	"Woody 'n' You" (originally released on Relaxin' )	Dizzy Gillespie	11 May 1956	5:01
3.	"Ahmad's Blues" (originally released on Workin' )	Ahmad Jamal	11 May 1956	7:24
4.	"Surrey with the Fringe on Top" (originally released on Steamin' )	Richard Rodgers, Oscar Hammerstein	11 May 1956	5:27
5.	"It Never Entered My Mind" (originally released on Workin' )	Richard Rodgers, Lorenz Hart	11 May 1956	5:22
6.	"When I Fall in Love" (originally released on Steamin' )	Edward Heyman, Victor Young	11 May 1956	4:21
7.	"Salt Peanuts" (originally released on Steamin' )	Dizzy Gillespie, Kenny Clarke	11 May 1956	6:07
8.	"Four" (originally released on Workin' )	Miles Davis	11 May 1956	4:23
9.	"The Theme (Take 1)" (originally released on Workin' )	Miles Davis	11 May 1956	2:01
10.	"The Theme (Take 2)" (originally released on Workin' )	Miles Davis	11 May 1956	1:05
11.	"If I Were a Bell" (originally released on Relaxin' )	Frank Loesser	October 26 1956	8:15
12.	"Well You Needn't" (originally released on Steamin' )	Thelonious Monk	October 26 1956	6:18

=== Disc three ===
No.	Title	Writer(s)	Recording date	Length
1.	"'Round Midnight" (originally released on Miles Davis and the Modern Jazz Giants)	Thelonious Monk	October 26 1956	5:25
2.	"Half Nelson" (originally released on Workin' )	Miles Davis	October 26 1956	4:45
3.	"You're My Everything" (originally released on Relaxin' )	Harry Warren, Mort Dixon, Joe Young	October 26 1956	5:18
4.	"I Could Write a Book" (originally released on Relaxin' )	Richard Rodgers, Lorenz Hart	October 26 1956	5:11
5.	"Oleo" (originally released on Relaxin' )	Sonny Rollins	October 26 1956	6:22
6.	"Airegin" (originally released on Cookin' )	Sonny Rollins	October 26 1956	4:24
7.	"Tune Up" (originally released on Cookin' )	Miles Davis	October 26 1956	5:41
8.	"When Lights Are Low" (originally released on Cookin' )	Benny Carter, Spencer Williams	October 26 1956	7:30
9.	"Blues by Five" (originally released on Cookin' )	Red Garland	October 26 1956	10:23
10.	"My Funny Valentine" (originally released on Cookin' )	Richard Rodgers, Lorenz Hart	October 26 1956	6:04

=== Disc four ===
No.	Title	Writer(s)	Length
1.	"Steve Allen Intro"		1:52
2.	"Max Is Making Wax" (Tonight Starring Steve Allen performance)	Oscar Pettiford	3:01
3.	"Steve Allen Intro 2"		2:06
4.	"It Never Entered My Mind" (Tonight Starring Steve Allen performance)	Richard Rodgers, Lorenz Hart	2:56
5.	"Tune Up" (live at the Blue Note, Philadelphia)	Miles Davis	4:25
6.	"Walkin'" (live at the Blue Note, Philadelphia)	Richard Carpenter	5:21
7.	"Four" (live at the Café Bohemia)	Miles Davis	4:52
8.	"Bye Bye Blackbird" (live at the Café Bohemia)	Ray Henderson, Mort Dixon	6:55
9.	"Walkin'" (live at the Café Bohemia)	Richard Carpenter	6:34
10.	"Two Bass Hit" (live at the Café Bohemia)	Dizzy Gillespie, John Lewis	3:17

== Personnel ==
=== Miles Davis Quintet ===
- Miles Davis — trumpet
- John Coltrane — tenor saxophone
- Red Garland — piano
- Bill Evans — piano on disc four tracks 7–10
- Paul Chambers — bass
- Philly Joe Jones — drums

=== Production personnel ===
- Bob Weinstock — original producer
- Rudy Van Gelder — original engineer
- Joe Tarantino — digital remastering
- Burt Goldblatt, Katherine Holzman Goldblatt, Michael Randolph, Don Schlitten, Chuck Stewart, Ted Williams — photography
- Bob Blumenthal — reissue liner notes
