= Miles: The New Miles Davis Quintet =

Studio album by Miles Davis
- Released: April 1956
- Recorded: November 16, 1955
- Studio: Van Gelder (Hackensack)
- Genre: Jazz
- Length: 33:47
- Labels: Prestige; PRLP 7014
- Producer: Bob Weinstock

Miles Davis chronology
Miles Davis and Horns (1956)	Miles: The New Miles Davis Quintet (1956)	Quintet/Sextet (1956)

Professional ratings
Review scores
Source	Rating
AllMusic	3.5/5 stars
Billboard	8.0/10 stars
The Encyclopedia of Popular Music	3/5 stars
The Penguin Guide to Jazz Recordings	3/4 stars
The Rolling Stone Jazz Record Guide	4/5 stars
DownBeat	4/5 stars

Miles: The New Miles Davis Quintet, also reissued as The Original Quintet, is a studio album by the jazz musician Miles Davis which was released in April 1956 through Prestige Records. It is the debut record by the Miles Davis Quintet, and generally known by the original title Miles as indicated on the cover.

== Background ==
In the summer of 1955, Davis performed a noted set at the Newport Jazz Festival and had been approached by Columbia Records executive George Avakian, offering a contract with the label if he could form a regular band. Davis assembled his first regular quintet to meet a commitment at the Café Bohemia in July. By September, the lineup stabilized to include John Coltrane on tenor saxophone, Red Garland on piano, Paul Chambers on bass, and Philly Joe Jones on drums.

Still under contract to Prestige, an arrangement dating back to January 1951, Davis convinced Avakian to buy out his contract. The terms of the deal between Avakian and Prestige owner Bob Weinstock allowed Davis to record for Columbia but not release any of the material until Davis fulfilled his remaining duty to Prestige. Davis took the quintet into Columbia's studio on October 26 to record titles that would be issued on Round About Midnight. Three weeks later the quintet entered the studio of Rudy Van Gelder in Hackensack, New Jersey, yielding the six titles for this album. During the following year, Davis and his quintet would record enough material over two Van Gelder sessions to yield Cookin', Relaxin', Workin', and Steamin' and fulfill their contractual obligation to Prestige.

== Content ==
The songs were a mix of pop and jazz standards, items familiar enough to present few problems to the fledgling band, given the Prestige policy of offering no compensation for rehearsal time. "The Theme" would continue to be Davis' standard set closer, and Coltrane does not play on "There Is No Greater Love".

== Track listing ==
=== Side one ===
No.	Title	Writer(s)	Length
1.	"Just Squeeze Me"	Duke Ellington, Lee Gaines	7:27
2.	"There Is No Greater Love"	Isham Jones, Marty Symes	5:19
3.	"How Am I to Know?"	Dorothy Parker, Jack King	4:39

=== Side two ===
No.	Title	Writer(s)	Length
1.	"S'posin'"	Paul Denniker, Andy Razaf	5:15
2.	"The Theme"	Miles Davis	5:49
3.	"Stablemates"	Benny Golson	5:18

== Personnel ==
- Miles Davis – trumpet
- John Coltrane – tenor saxophone
- Red Garland – piano
- Paul Chambers – bass
- Philly Joe Jones – drums

== See also ==
- 'Round About Midnight (1957)
- Cookin' (1957)
- Relaxin' (1958)
- Workin' (1960)
- Steamin' (1961)
- The Legendary Prestige Quintet Sessions (2006)
