= Café Bohemia =

Jazz club in New York City

Coordinates: 40.7326°N 74.0026°W

The Café Bohemia was a jazz club located at 15 Barrow Street in the Greenwich Village neighborhood of New York City. Its original run lasted from 1955 to 1960, and was revived at its original location from October 2019 to May 2023.

== History ==
The club was opened in 1955 by Jimmy Garofolo. Garofolo had owned the room since 1949 and had operated it as a restaurant, bar, and stage at various times, each endeavor turning out unsuccessfully. In 1955, saxophonist Charlie Parker was living across the street from the club with poet Ted Joans. Parker offered to play the club for Garofolo in order to get his drinks for free, which unofficially began the room's short-lived life as a jazz club. Parker died prior to the beginning of his engagement at the Bohemia, but the hype generated around his name being promoted was enough to garner further support for the new club.

Among the bands that played the club were the first Miles Davis Quintet, Art Blakey's original Jazz Messengers, and Kenny Dorham's Jazz Prophets. At one point Herbie Nichols was the intermission pianist. Miles Davis's Prestige recordings Workin', Relaxin', Steamin', and Cookin' were meant to convey the spirit of the group's performances at the Bohemia. This is most evident on Workin' where the band's set closer "The Theme" is played at the end of each side of the record, and one piano trio number, "Ahmad's Blues", is featured.

Oscar Pettiford penned the song "Bohemia After Dark" in spirit of the club.

The cover photograph of the Miles Davis record 'Round About Midnight was one of several taken by Marvin Koner during the quintet's stay at the club in 1956. The photograph retains the actual coloring but is cropped from the original. The red hue was due to a red fluorescent light above the bandstand.

In October 2019, Café Bohemia was revived in its original location, in the basement of the Barrow Street Ale House (which was established in 1990).

In May 2023, Café Bohemia announced that they were shutting down again.

== Cannonball Adderley's New York debut ==
On June 19, 1955 Julian and Nat Adderley arrived in New York on a trip for the former to work on his master's degree at New York University. That first night in the city the brothers went to the Café Bohemia to hear the Oscar Pettiford band, which was the club's house band at the time. Jerome Richardson, who was the group's regular saxophonist was unavailable that evening due to a recording session. Pettiford asked Charlie Rouse - who was in the audience - if he would sit in, but Rouse did not have his saxophone with him. Pettiford then noticed another audience member, Adderley, who had a saxophone case with him and told Rouse to ask this unknown man if he could borrow his horn. Instead, Rouse asked Cannonball if he would like to sit in with the group. Reluctantly, the leader complied and allowed Adderley to play. Overnight Adderley rose to prominence on the New York jazz scene. On June 21 he officially played his first night at the Bohemia; on June 28, 1955, he recorded with Kenny Clarke's group; on July 14 he recorded his first album as a leader. By October 1957 he was a member of the Miles Davis Sextet.

== Live recordings ==
- Kenny Dorham - 'Round About Midnight at the Cafe Bohemia (Blue Note, 1956)
- Art Blakey - The Jazz Messengers at the Café Bohemia, Volume 1-2 (Blue Note, 1956)
- Randy Weston - Jazz à la Bohemia (Riverside, 1956)
- Charles Mingus - Mingus at the Bohemia (Debut, 1955), The Charles Mingus Quintet & Max Roach (Fantasy, 1955)
- George Wallington - Live! at Cafe Bohemia (Progressive/Prestige, 1956)
- Miles Davis Quintet with John Coltrane - The Unissued Café Bohemia Broadcasts (Domino, 2013)
- Lester Young - Vol. 2 - Live Recordings 1948-1956 (Musidisc, 1976)
