= Apsey =

Apsey may refer to:

People

- Len Apsey (1910–1967), Welsh professional association football player
- Apsey, a variant of the Russian male first name Avsey

Places

- Apsey Beach, fishing settlement in the Canadian province of Newfoundland and Labrador
- Apsey Brook, settlement on Random Island in Trinity Bay, Newfoundland and Labrador
- Apsey Cove, formerly Apsey Cove Point, Newfoundland and Labrador
- Apsey Green, village in Suffolk, England
- Apsey Point, farming and fishing settlement in the Trinity District, Newfoundland and Labrador

== See also ==
- Haapse, village in Estonia
- Apse (disambiguation)
