= APS =

APS or Aps or aps or similar may refer to:

== Businesses and organizations ==
=== Businesses and public bodies ===
- Algeria Press Service, a news agency
- Arizona Public Service, an electric power company
- Australian Protective Service, an Australian Commonwealth law enforcement agency
- Australian Public Service, the federal civil service of the Commonwealth of Australia
- ASTRA Platform Services, now SES Platform Services

=== Education ===
- Abbottabad Public School, in Pakistan
- Alamogordo Public Schools, in New Mexico, U.S.
- Albuquerque Public Schools, in New Mexico, U.S.
- Allendale Public Schools, in Michigan, U.S.
- Arlington Public Schools, in Virginia, U.S.
- Associated Public Schools of Victoria, in Australia
- Atlanta Public Schools, in Georgia, U.S.
- Aurora Public Schools
  - Aurora Public Schools (Colorado), in Colorado, U.S.
  - East Aurora Public School District 131, in Illinois, U.S.
  - West Aurora Public School District 129, in Illinois, U.S.
- Indian Army Public Schools

=== Other organisations ===
- Aborigines' Protection Society, a human rights group
- Alternative Press Syndicate, a network of countercultural newspapers and magazines
- American Pediatric Society, a medical organization
- American Philatelic Society, a stamp collecting foundation
- American Philosophical Society, an American scholarly organization
- American Physical Society, a not-for-profit membership organization
- American Physiological Society, a non-profit professional society
- American Phytopathological Society, an international scientific organization
- Armenian Professional Society, a membership organization
- Association for Psychological Science, an international non-profit organization
- Association for Psychosocial Studies, a British learned society
- Australasian Proteomics Society, a learned society
- Australian Psychological Society, a professional association

== Places ==
- Alba-la-Romaine, Ardèche, France, known as Aps until 1904
- Apsley railway station, England, station code APS

== Science and technology ==
- Adenosine 5'-phosphosulfate, metabolic precursor to 3'-phosphoadenosine-5'-phosphosulfate
- Antiphospholipid syndrome, an autoimmune state
- Autoimmune polyendocrine syndrome, a rare disease
- Advanced Photon Source, a synchrotron X-ray source at Argonne National Laboratory
- Advanced planning and scheduling, a manufacturing management process
- Algebra of physical space, in physics
- Ammonium persulfate, in chemistry
- Apus, abbreviation Aps, a constellation
- Application Packaging Standard, for integrating application software
- Active-pixel sensor, an image sensor
- Advanced Photo System, a film format in photography
- Asynchronous Protocol Specification, or X.445, a telecommunications standard
- Atmospheric Plasma Spray, a thermal spraying technique
- Application support sublayer of the Zigbee specification
- Accessible Pedestrian Signal, a pedestrian crossing
- Alstom APS, electrical ground-level power supply for trams
- Auxiliary Propulsion System of the S-IVB launch vehicle

== Military ==
- APS underwater rifle, a Soviet firearm
- Active protection system, for vehicles against missile attacks
- Africa Partnership Station, a United States Navy maritime safety initiative
- Stechkin automatic pistol (Avtomaticheskiy Pistolet Stechkina)
- APS, a classification symbol United States Navy amphibious warfare ships

== Other uses ==
- Adult Protective Services, social services in the United States
- Advanced planning and scheduling, a manufacturing management process
- Annual Population Survey, a household survey in Great Britain
- Anpartsselskab (ApS), the Danish term for a limited liability company
- Average propensity to save, in Keynesian economics

== See also ==
- Apse (disambiguation)
- AP (disambiguation)
