= 'Round About Midnight =

Studio album by Miles Davis
- Released: March 4, 1957
- Recorded: October 26, 1955; June 5 and September 10, 1956
- Studio: Columbia 30th St (New York City)
- Genre: Jazz
- Length: 38:47
- Label: Columbia
- Producer: George Avakian

Miles Davis chronology
Birth of the Cool (1957)	'Round About Midnight (1957)	Walkin' (1957)

'Round About Midnight is a studio album by the jazz trumpeter and composer Miles Davis with his quintet. It was released through Columbia Records in March 1957, and is Davis's first record on the label. The recording took place at Columbia's New York studio in three sessions between October 1955 and September 1956.

== Background ==
At the Newport Jazz Festival in 1955, Davis performed the song "'Round Midnight" as part of an all-star jam session, with the song's composer Thelonious Monk, along with Connie Kay and Percy Heath of the Modern Jazz Quartet, Zoot Sims, and Gerry Mulligan. Davis's solo received a positive reception from many jazz fans and critics. His response to this performance was typically laconic: "What are they talking about? I just played the way I always play." George Avakian of Columbia Records was in the audience, and his brother Aram persuaded him that he ought to sign Davis to the label.

Davis signed with Columbia and formed his "first great quintet" with John Coltrane on saxophone. 'Round About Midnight was his first album for the label. He was still under contract to Prestige, but he had an agreement that he could record material for Columbia to release after the expiration of his Prestige contract. Recording took place at Columbia studios; the first session was on October 26, 1955 at Studio D, during which the track "Ah-Leu-Cha" was recorded with three numbers that did not appear on the album. This is the first studio recording of the quintet. The remainder of the album was recorded during sessions on June 5, 1956 ("Dear Old Stockholm", "Bye Bye Blackbird" and "Tadd's Delight") and September 10, 1956 ("All of You" and the titular "'Round Midnight") at Columbia's 30th Street Studio. During the same period, the Miles Davis Quintet was also recording sessions to fulfill its contract with Prestige.

== Reissues ==
On April 17, 2001, Sony reissued the album on compact disc for its Columbia/Legacy label with 24-bit audio remastering and four previously released bonus tracks from the initial sessions. "Budo" had been released as part of the 1957 anthology album on Columbia, Jazz Omnibus, and "Sweet Sue, Just You" had appeared on the 1956 album by Leonard Bernstein explaining jazz to the classical audience, What Is Jazz. A two-disc reissue of June 14, 2005, included the 2001 reissue with a second disc containing Davis' 1955 Newport Jazz Festival performance of "'Round Midnight", along with a recording of the quintet's set from the 1956 Pacific Jazz Festival. The Newport track had been released for the first time the previous year on the Legacy compilation Happy Birthday Newport: 50 Swinging Years!

== Reception ==
Professional ratings
Review scores
Source	Rating
All About Jazz	(favorable)
AllMusic	5/5 stars
DownBeat	5/5 stars
The Encyclopedia of Popular Music	4/5 stars
The Guardian	4/5 stars
MusicHound Jazz	5/5 stars
The Penguin Guide to Jazz	3/4 stars
PopMatters	(favorable)
Rolling Stone	5/5 stars

In his five-star review in the May 16, 1957, issue of DownBeat, Ralph J. Gleason called the album "modern jazz conceived and executed in the very best style." Ralph Berton of The Record Changer called the album "orthodox, middle-of-the-road conservative progressive jazz." The Penguin Guide to Jazz said it "sounds like a footnote" to the Prestige contractual obligation sessions (Miles, Relaxin', Workin', Steamin', and Cookin') and that "the material is fine but somehow fails to cast quite the consistent spell which the Prestige recordings do." Bob Rusch of Cadence wrote, "everything about this date, from the black-and-white cover photo, washed in red, of Miles Davis, removed in thought behind dark glasses, to the performances, is classic. Not surprisingly, careful packaging and exquisite artistry have created a legend and, in this case, one of the essential recordings in the history of recorded music."

== Track listing ==
=== Original release ===
Side one
No.	Title	Writer(s)	Length
1.	"'Round Midnight"	Thelonious Monk; Bernie Hanighen; Cootie Williams	5:58
2.	"Ah-Leu-Cha"	Charlie Parker	5:53
3.	"All of You"	Cole Porter	7:03

Side two
No.	Title	Writer(s)	Length
1.	"Bye Bye Blackbird"	Mort Dixon; Ray Henderson	7:57
2.	"Tadd's Delight"	Tadd Dameron	4:29
3.	"Dear Old Stockholm"	Traditional; Stan Getz (Arr.)	7:52

=== 2001 bonus tracks ===
No.	Title	Writer(s)	Length
7.	"Two Bass Hit" (previously issued on Circle in the Round)	John Lewis, Dizzy Gillespie	3:45
8.	"Little Melonae" (previously issued on Basic Miles)	Jackie McLean	7:22
9.	"Budo" (previously issued on Jazz Omnibus)	Bud Powell, Miles Davis	4:17
10.	"Sweet Sue, Just You" (previously issued on What Is Jazz)	Will J. Harris, Victor Young	3:40

=== 2005 anniversary edition bonus disc ===
- All tracks were recorded live at the Pacific Jazz Festival, Pasadena Civic Auditorium, February 18, 1956, except where indicated.

No.	Title	Writer(s)	Length
1.	"'Round Midnight" (live at the Newport Jazz Festival, July 17, 1955)	Thelonious Monk, Bernie Hanighen, Cootie Williams	6:00
2.	"Introduction by Gene Norman"		1:36
3.	"Chance It (aka Max Making Wax)"	Oscar Pettiford	4:33
4.	"Walkin'"	Richard Carpenter	10:02
5.	"Dialogue by Gene Norman and Miles Davis"		0:27
6.	"It Never Entered My Mind"	Richard Rodgers, Lorenz Hart	5:18
7.	"Woody 'n' You"	Dizzy Gillespie	5:46
8.	"Salt Peanuts"	Dizzy Gillespie, Kenny Clarke	4:33
9.	"Closing Theme"	Miles Davis	0:28

== Personnel ==
=== The Miles Davis Quintet ===
- Miles Davis – trumpet
- John Coltrane – tenor saxophone
- Red Garland – piano
- Paul Chambers – double bass
- Philly Joe Jones – drums

Newport personnel bonus disc track one

- Miles Davis – trumpet
- Zoot Sims – tenor saxophone
- Gerry Mulligan – baritone saxophone
- Thelonious Monk – piano
- Percy Heath – double bass
- Connie Kay – drums

Production

- George Avakian – producer, liner notes
- Frank Laico – engineer
- Teo Macero – mastering
- Aram Avakian, Don Hunstein, Dennis Stock – photography
- Seth Rothstein – reissue project director
- Bob Belden, Michael Cuscuna – reissue producers
- Ray Moore – reissue engineer
- Mark Wilder – reissue engineering and mastering
- Randall Martin – reissue design
- Howard Fritzson – reissue art director
- Bob Blumenthal – reissue liner notes

== Charts ==
Chart (2026)	Peak position
Greek Albums (IFPI)	60
