= Tenor Madness =

1956 studio album by Sonny Rollins

Studio album by Sonny Rollins
- Released: October 1956
- Recorded: May 24, 1956
- Studios: Van Gelder Studio, Hackensack, New Jersey
- Genre: Jazz
- Length: 35:24
- Label: Prestige
- Producer: Bob Weinstock

Sonny Rollins chronology
| Sonny Rollins Plus 4 (1956) | Tenor Madness (1956) | Saxophone Colossus (1956) |

Tenor Madness is an album by jazz musician Sonny Rollins released in October 1956 by Prestige Records. It is most notable for its title track, the only known recording featuring both Rollins and John Coltrane.

== History ==
Rollins, who had recorded with Miles Davis in 1954 and briefly joined Davis's working group in the summer of 1955, recruited the members of Davis's "First Great Quintet" to back him for the Tenor Madness session. This included, on the title cut only, fellow saxophonist Coltrane. Both were emerging as prominent tenor saxophone players, though Rollins had been recording under his own name for several years, while Coltrane's debut album under his own name would not be released until 1957.

At the time of the Tenor Madness session, Rollins was a member of the Max Roach/Clifford Brown Quintet, and two months before the session, he had recorded as a leader the LP Sonny Rollins Plus 4 with the fellow members of that group. Two weeks before the Tenor Madness session, Coltrane, Red Garland, Paul Chambers, and Philly Joe Jones, recorded material with Davis for Prestige Records that would be later released on the albums Workin', Relaxin', and Steamin' with the Miles Davis Quintet.

Critic Chris Kelsey wrote that although the rhythm section's playing on Tenor Madness was "somewhat less vital" than on the Miles Davis Quintet session of May 1956, the historical importance of Tenor Madness lies in the title track. It is the only existing recording with Rollins and Coltrane playing together.

The title track is a 12-minute showcase for Rollins and Coltrane. While the title piece's B-flat blues melody has become closely associated with Rollins, it was first recorded in 1946 by Kenny Clarke and His 52nd Street Boys as "Royal Roost", and has also been recorded under the title "Rue Chaptal." "Royal Roost" is usually credited as a Kenny Clarke composition; as "Tenor Madness," it was credited to Sonny Rollins.

It is easy to distinguish between the two saxophonists on the track "Tenor Madness", as Coltrane has a much brighter and more boisterous sound as compared to Rollins' smoother, "wet-reed" tone. However, as jazz critic Dan Krow said, the two complement each other, and the track does not sound like a competition between the two rising saxophonists.

"Paul's Pal" is a composition by Rollins named for bassist Paul Chambers. "When Your Lover Has Gone" is a 1931 composition by Einar Aaron Swan re-interpreted as a drum-driven blues track. The ballad "My Reverie" (an adaptation of a Claude Debussy's 1890 piano piece "Rêverie") is one of Rollins's best known 1950s ballad recordings. "The Most Beautiful Girl in the World", a tune from the 1935 musical Jumbo, is a Rodgers & Hart composition that goes here from a jazz waltz to a fast-paced 4/4 tune.

== Reception ==
Professional ratings
Review scores
| Source | Rating |
|---|---|
| AllMusic | 4.5/5 stars |
| The Rolling Stone Jazz Record Guide | 5/5 stars |
| The Penguin Guide to Jazz Recordings | 4/4 stars |

The AllMusic review by Michael G. Nastos calls the album "a recording that should stand proudly alongside Saxophone Colossus as some of the best work of Sonny Rollins in his early years, it's also a testament to the validity, vibrancy, and depth of modern jazz in the post-World War era. It belongs on everybody's shelf." Author and musician Peter Niklas Wilson called it "one of the most famous combo recordings of the 1950s".

== Track listing ==
All tracks by Sonny Rollins except where noted.

1. "Tenor Madness" – 12:16
2. "When Your Lover Has Gone" (Einar Aaron Swan) – 6:11
3. "Paul's Pal" – 5:12
4. "My Reverie" (Larry Clinton, Claude Debussy) – 6:08
5. "The Most Beautiful Girl in the World" (Richard Rodgers, Lorenz Hart) – 5:37

== Personnel ==
- Sonny Rollins – tenor saxophone
- John Coltrane – tenor saxophone (#1 only)
- Red Garland – piano
- Paul Chambers – double bass
- Philly Joe Jones – drums
