= Miles Ahead (album) =

Studio album by Miles Davis
- Released: October 21, 1957 (mono)
- Recorded: May 6–August 22, 1957
- Studios: Columbia 30th Street Studio, New York City
- Genres: Cool jazz; third stream
- Length: 37:21
- Labels: Columbia CL 1041 (mono); CS 8633 (pseudo stereo, 1961)
- Producers: George Avakian, Cal Lampley

Miles Davis chronology
Cookin' with the Miles Davis Quintet (1957)	Miles Ahead (1957)	Bags' Groove (1957)

Alternate cover
- LP cover used for reissues

Miles Ahead is a studio album by the American jazz musician Miles Davis, released on October 21, 1957, by Columbia Records. It was Davis' first collaboration with arranger Gil Evans since the 1949-50 Birth of the Cool sessions. Along with their subsequent collaborations Porgy and Bess (1959) and Sketches of Spain (1960), Miles Ahead is one of the most famous recordings of Third Stream, a fusion of jazz, European classical, and world musics. Davis played flugelhorn throughout.

== Background ==
In February 1957, following a resurgence in Davis' career, Capitol Records released the complete Miles Davis Nonet recordings on LP for the first time, with the new title Birth of the Cool. This inspired Columbia producer George Avakian to conceive of presenting Davis, for his second album on the label, in an even larger context, away from his usual quintet, with the goal of achieving both an artistic and financial success. Davis was enthusiastic about the project, and as he and Avakian discussed it, it became clear that Gil Evans, who had done some of the arrangements for the nonet, should be hired to arrange it.

Evans had not been involved in any jazz projects between 1953 and 1956 but had recently returned to arranging for the Helen Merrill album Dream of You, which was completed the same month as the rerelease of the nonet recordings. Evans then went on to arrange "Round Midnight" (uncredited) for the Miles Davis Quintet album 'Round About Midnight. Davis, Evans, and Avakian sketched out the concept for Miles Ahead over lunch. "The idea," Avakian said, "was not to present a group of people with Miles as leader. It was to present Miles period—in front—and then the setting was all Gil."

=== Composition and recording ===
Evans arranged a diverse array of ten pieces for the album. Although some sources maintain that the album constitutes a single uninterrupted suite, in fact, there are two suites: The first consists of the first seven pieces, "Springsville" to the climactic "New Rhumba". Then, after a brief pause, the three-part second suite, explicitly titled a "Medley", commences with a direct allusion to the dissonant opening of the second movement of Alban Berg's Violin Concerto. Otherwise, each track flows into the next without interruption; the only exception to this rule on the original LP was after the title track since it was placed last on side A. (A one-second pause between tracks five and six remains on the Columbia/Legacy CD edition.) Davis is the only soloist on Miles Ahead, which features a large ensemble consisting of sixteen woodwind and brass players. Art Taylor played drums on the sessions, and the then-current Miles Davis Quintet member Paul Chambers was the bassist. Wynton Kelly, who would later join Davis' regular small group, plays piano on a few tracks.

The suites weld together a wide variety of material into coherent wholes, from "The Maids of Cadiz" by French classical composer Léo Delibes to Kurt Weill's theater song "My Ship" and from modern jazz compositions like Dave Brubeck's Ellington tribute "The Duke" and Ahmad Jamal's "New Rhumba" to originals by Davis and Evans like the title track and "Blues for Pablo" (itself based on themes by classical composers Manuel de Falla and Carlos Chávez). Evans biographer Larry Hicock observes, "Miles Ahead offered the best example yet of Gil's genius for 'recomposing'—transforming other people's music into something all his own."

Evans "toiled endlessly over each and every note" of the complex scores. As Davis said in a 1961 interview, "When Gil is writing, he might spend three days on ten bars of music. He'll lock himself up, put a 'do not disturb' sign on the door, and not even his wife, Lillian, can come in."

The album was originally recorded at Columbia's 30th Street Studio on May 6, 10, 23 and 27, 1957. On August 22, 1957, Davis rerecorded material to cover or patch mistakes or omissions in his solos using overdubbing. The fact that this album was originally produced in mono made these inserted overdubbings particularly obvious on the pseudo-stereo 1987 CD release. Columbia pulled that edition and replaced it with a 1993 CD release, which, in turn, was superseded by the 1997 Columbia/Legacy version, in full stereo for the first time and with four alternate takes.

=== Album cover ===
Davis was reportedly unhappy about the album's original cover, which featured a photograph of a young white woman and child aboard a sailboat. He made his displeasure known to producer Avakian, asking, "Why'd you put that white bitch on there?" Avakian later stated that the question was made in jest. For later releases of the record, however, the original cover-photo has been replaced by a photograph of Davis playing his trumpet.

== Critical reception ==
Professional ratings
Review scores
Source	Rating
AllMusic	5/5 stars
Disc	+
DownBeat	5/5 stars
The Encyclopedia of Popular Music	5/5 stars
Entertainment Weekly	A
The Penguin Guide to Jazz	4/4 stars

The Penguin Guide to Jazz gave Miles Ahead a four-star rating out of a possible four stars and called the album "a quiet masterpiece ... with a guaranteed place in the top flight of Miles albums."

Of Davis' flugelhorn, Kevin Whitehead of Cadence wrote that it "seemed to suit [Davis] better than trumpet: more full-bodied, less shrill, it glosses over his technical deficiencies." The Penguin Guide, on the other hand, opined that "the flugelhorn's sound isn't so very different from his trumpet soloing, though palpably softer-edged .... [S]ome of the burnish seems to be lost."

Jazz critic Ted Gioia in his History of Jazz says that the album "ranks among the high points of both artists' careers. Davis's playing on flugelhorn represented a novel 'anti-virtuosity' that he would refine over the next several years. He rarely challenges the band in the style of a Gillespie or Eldridge, content to float over Evans's impressionist harmonies. His phrases reach for the essence of the music, for sheltered spaces within the chords."

Evans biographer Larry Hicock wrote, "Miles Ahead was an immediate success on every level—artistic, commercial, financial, aesthetic, and critical. It bolstered Columbia's image in the jazz market. It enhanced George Avakian's reputation not only as a hit-maker but also as a producer of jazz as art music. It solidified the emergence of Miles Davis as the foremost jazz voice of his time. And it brought Gil Evans into the limelight for the first time in his career."

Tony Hall of Disc said the album was "one of the finest records of the decade" and rated it five stars and plus.

== Legacy ==
Davis later related that Evans "would call me up at 3 a.m. and tell me, 'If you're ever depressed, Miles, just listen to 'Springsville'", the opening track on the album.

Davis revisited the first six Evans arrangements on Miles Ahead in 1991—three years after Evans' death—on the album Miles & Quincy Live at Montreux, with Quincy Jones conducting the Gil Evans Orchestra. Don Cheadle's 2015 biopic about Davis took its title from this album.

== Track listing ==
1. "Springsville" (John Carisi) – 3:27
2. "The Maids of Cadiz" (Léo Delibes) – 3:53
3. "The Duke" (Dave Brubeck) – 3:35
4. "My Ship" (Kurt Weill, Ira Gershwin) – 4:28
5. "Miles Ahead" (Davis, Evans) – 3:29
6. "Blues for Pablo" (Evans) – 5:18
7. "New Rhumba" (Ahmad Jamal) – 4:37
8. Medley Pt. 1: "The Meaning of the Blues" (Bobby Troup, Leah Worth) – 2:48
9. Medley Pt. 2: "Lament" (J. J. Johnson) – 2:14
10. "I Don't Wanna Be Kissed (By Anyone but You)" (Harold Spina, Jack Elliot) – 3:05

Bonus tracks on the 1997 CD reissue (Columbia/Legacy CK 65121):

11. "Springsville" (Remake take 7)
12. "Miles Ahead" (incorrectly labeled as being one of "Blues for Pablo")
13. "Medley: The Meaning of the Blues/Lament" (Rehearsal)
14. "I Don't Wanna Be Kissed (By Anyone but You)" [Alternate take]

== Personnel ==
- Miles Davis – flugelhorn
- Gil Evans – conductor, arranger
  - Bernie Glow – lead trumpet
  - John Carisi, Taft Jordan, Louis Mucci, Ernie Royal – trumpet
  - Jimmy Buffington (tracks 1, 6, 7, 12), Tony Miranda, Willie Ruff – French horn
  - Joe Bennett, Jimmy Cleveland, Frank Rehak – trombone
  - Tom Mitchell – bass trombone (tracks 2, 3)
  - Bill Barber – tuba
  - Eddie Caine (tracks 3, 7, 10, 12), Sid Cooper – flute, clarinet
  - Romeo Penque – flute, clarinet, oboe, bass clarinet
  - Danny Bank – bass clarinet
  - Lee Konitz – alto saxophone
  - Wynton Kelly – piano (except tracks 3, 7, 10, 12)
  - Paul Chambers – bass
  - Art Taylor – drums

=== Production ===
- George Avakian – producer
- Cal Lampley – assistant producer
- Harold Chapman – recording engineer
- André Hodeir – liner notes

1987 first remastered pseudo stereo issue, Columbia Jazz Masterpieces series CJ/CK 40784

- Teo Macero – digital remix producer
- Tim Geelan – mixing engineer (at CBS Studios, New York City)
- Vlado Meller – mastering
- George Avakian – additional liner notes

1993 remastered mono (in part pseudo stereo) issue, Columbia Jazz Masterpieces, Columbia/Legacy (Sony Music) CK 53225

- George Avakian – digital remix producer
- Ray Moore – digital remix engineer (at Sony Music Studios, New York City)

1997 20-bit remastering, expanded edition CK 65121

- Phil Schaap – remastering, reissue producer, additional liner notes
- Phil Schaap, Mark Wilder – restoration and editing
- Don Hunstein – session photography in 20-page booklet
