= Apse (disambiguation) =

The apse or apsis or apside (plural: apses or apsides) are architectural features of churches

Apse or apsis or apses or apsides or apside or variation, may also refer to:

- Apsis (or apse or apside), the nearest or furthest points of an spatial orbit
- Apse chapel (or apsis chapel or apside chapel or apsidal chapel; also known as the apse or apsis or apside), a part of a church that uses the apse architectural feature
- Apse (band), a U.S. rock band
- APSE, the Ada Programming Support Environment
- Apse Heath, Isle of Wight, UK
- Apse Manor, Isle of Wight, UK; a manor house
- Aina Apse (1926–2015), New Zealand potter

== See also ==
- APS (disambiguation)
- Apsey (disambiguation)
