= Osei =

Osei is both an Akan surname and a given name meaning 'noble' or 'honorable'. It is the fourth most common surname in Ghana. Notable people with the name include:

== Surname ==
- Abena Osei Asare (born 1979), Ghanaian politician
- Anthony Akoto Osei (born 1953), Ghanaian economist and politician
- Charlotte Osei (born 1969), former Ghana Electoral Commissioner
- Emmanuel Osei (born 1981), Ghanaian association football player
- Emmanuel Osei Kuffour (born 1976), Ghanaian association football player
- Eric Osei-Owusu (born 1963), Ghanaian politician
- John Frimpong Osei (born 1971), Ghanaian politician
- Joseph Osei Owusu (born 1962), Ghanaian politician
- Kennedy Osei (born 1966), Ghanaian middle distance runner
- Kevin Osei (born 1991), French-born Ghanaian association football player
- Michael Osei (born 1971), Ghanaian association football player
- Mikki Osei Berko, Ghanaian actor
- Nana Osei Bonsu II (born 1939), regent of the Ashanti Kingdom
- Otumfuo Nana Osei Tutu II (born 1950), Asantehene
- Ransford Osei (born 1990), Ghanaian professional association football player
- Teddy Osei (1937–2025), Ghanaian musician

== Given name ==
- Osei Bonsu (died 1824), Asantehene
- Osei Kofi Tutu I (died 1717), founder of the Ashanti Confederacy
- Osei Kwadwo, Ashanti king
- Osei Kwame Panyin, Asantehene
- Osei Telesford (born 1983) Trinidadian Footballer

== See also ==
- Osseyi, alternative spelling of Osei more common in the neighboring country Togo
- Osei, alternative spelling of Osey, a variant of the Russian first name Avsey
