= Boisseau (surname) =

Boisseau is a French surname. Notable people with the surname include:

- Alfred Boisseau (1823–1901), Canadian artist
- Damien Boisseau, French voice actor
- Jocelyne Boisseau (born 1953), French actress
- Juanita Boisseau (1911–2012), American dancer
- Michelle Boisseau (1955–2017), American poet
- Nicolas-Gaspard Boisseau (1765–1842), Canadian politician
