= Ludie Jones =

American dancer (1916–2018)

Ludie Olivia Jones
- Born: January 28, 1916; New York City, New York, U.S.
- Died: October 3, 2018 (aged 102); New York City, New York, U.S.
- Occupation: Tap dancer

Ludie Olivia Jones (January 28, 1916 – October 3, 2018) was an American dancer. Jones was part of the Harlem Renaissance and started tap dancing at an early age. She had an early career that spanned the 1930s to the 1950s and was revived in the 1980s. Jones continued to dance and teach tap dance well into her later years.

== Biography ==
Ludie Olivia Jones was born in New York City on January 28, 1916, and was one of five siblings. Jones started dancing when she was three, after being introduced to the Charleston and the Time Step by a family friend. Soon after, her mother signed her up to take dance lessons and when Jones was eleven, she was teaching tap dance at Emma Kemp's studio.

Jones became a part of the chorus of Lew Leslie's Blackbirds of 1934 and went on to dance in London. When she completed her tour she formed a dance team with Peggy Wharton and Marion Worthy Warner called the Lang Sisters. The Lang Sisters danced in venues with Fats Waller, Louis Armstrong and Louie Russell. In 1941, she formed another group called The Three Poms with Sylvia Warner and Geraldine Ball. This group was an opening act for Cab Calloway's Band and featured different styles of dance with Jones performing as a rhythm dancer. The group was also featured on Broadway in Ethel Waters' "One Meatball". The Three Poms stayed together until the 1950s and also performed United Service Organizations shows across the globe.

In 1955, Jones began to work as a telephone operator for the New York Telephone Company, after having trouble finding tap dancing jobs. She stayed at the company until 1978, when she retired. In 1982, she started a dance group called the Swinging Seniors, which toured nursing homes and senior centers. It was later known as the Tapping Seniors.

In 1984, Jones was featured in "Shades of Harlem," which played at the Village Gate. The Paducah Sun wrote that "A special feature of the show is the tap dancing of Ludie Jones, a Harlem Renaissance lady from the original Cotton Club. She continues to stun audiences with her vigorous tap routines." She toured internationally with "Shades of Harlem". The New York Times noted her performance in "Shades of Harlem" and wrote "Clearly this is a tap dancer who enjoys being back in the spotlight with her solo 'Perdido.'"

Jones continued to teach tap-dancing into her nineties. The St. Louis Tap Festival honored Jones in 2008. In 2016, she was inducted into the International Tap Dance Hall of Fame.

Jones died on October 3, 2018, in New York, aged 102. According to cultural and dance historian, Delilah Jackson, Jones was considered "one of the greatest tap dancers in Harlem" and was essential in preserving that style of dance.
