= Shades of Harlem =

1983 musical revue

- Book: Jeree Wade
- Productions: 1983 off-Broadway

Shades of Harlem: A Cotton Club Musical is an off-Broadway musical theater revue of songs from the Harlem Renaissance. The show debuted in August 1983 at the Village Gate and has gone on to play around the world. The show features jazz music and dancing that would have been popular at the Cotton Club during the Harlem Renaissance. Original performances included dancers from the era, including Ludie Jones and Juanita Boisseau. The show received mixed reviews.

== About ==
Shades of Harlem was created by playwright Jeree Wade and billed as "A Cotton Club Musical." Wade wrote the show both to celebrate the past of black history and to look forward to a hopeful future for African Americans. Writers include Frank Owens, Ty Stephen, Branice McKenzie and Wade. Stephens created the choreography. Original sets were done by Linda Lombardi. Wade used members of the Swinging Seniors, including Ludie Jones, to ensure the performances were authentic. The show is a musical that is intended to celebrate the music and dance of the Harlem Renaissance.

An early version of the show debuted at Brown University in 1983 and was then rewritten and expanded. Shades of Harlem premiered in August 1983 at the Village Gate, and was sold out that night. After, it had an eight-month run at the Village Gate. On March 3, 1985, the show had its 200th staging at Village Gate. The musical has been performed regularly over time and across the world. The show lasts for about 3 hours.

The musical recreates a night at the Cotton Club. Music includes numbers by Duke Ellington, Billie Holiday and Fats Waller. Jones, Juanita Boisseau, and Alice Wilkie, original dancers from the Harlem Renaissance, were involved in the shows. Classic songs featured in the musical include "Stompin' At the Savoy," "I Got it Bad (and That Ain't Good)," and "God Bless the Child." Owens also included his own original songs. The history of Harlem is depicted behind the dancers and singers during the show, highlighting landmarks of black culture and famous people.

== Reviews ==
The New York Times called Shades of Harlem a "summerweight collage of music." The New York Amsterdam News called the show a "savory serving of entertainment, delivered from Harlem." The Village Voice was reported as writing that the show was "an enjoyable celebration of a great tradition." The Central New Jersey Home News reported that "the show never really seems to take off and at times seems to be dawdling along." The Daily News through the Associated Press wrote that while the performances of the "Harlem Renaissance Ladies" which included Ludie Jones, Juanita Boisseau and Alice Wilkie, were wonderful, the rest of the show lacked their "style, grace and good humor."
