= Bob Weinstock =

American record producer (1928–2006)

- Born: October 2, 1928
- Died: January 14, 2006 (aged 77); Boca Raton, Florida, USA
- Occupation: Record producer
- Spouse: Joan Weinstock
- Children: 3
- Musical career
- Genres: jazz
- Years active: 1949–1972
- Labels: Prestige Records

Bob Weinstock (October 2, 1928 – January 14, 2006) was an American record producer best known for his label Prestige Records, established in 1949, which was responsible for many significant jazz recordings during his more than two decades operating the firm.

== Early life ==
Born to a Jewish family, Weinstock's interest in music began at the age of eight when bought "armfuls of records" by jazz artists at nine cents each, opening up "a new world of music" for him. As a teenager growing up in Manhattan, on the Upper West Side, Weinstock started a business selling jazz records through advertisements in the pages of Record Changer magazine from his family's apartment, with the support of his father and uncle. He couldn't play or read music, but he had an ear that enabled him to pick up the nuances of jazz. He later rented some space in the Jazz Record Center on 47th Street. Bebop drummer Kenny Clarke was among those who visited his store, promising that when Weinstock opened a record label "he would get all the jazz greats to record" for him, and introducing him to artists including Thelonious Monk.

== Prestige Records ==
In January 1949 Weinstock created a label called New Jazz, with its first release a recording by the Lennie Tristano quintet. Later that year he formed Prestige Records, with its logo representing the surfeit of saxophonists he had been recording and releasing. With assistance from his father, and much traveling across the United States by bus, Weinstock was able to promote his company and gain air play and sales for jukeboxes for his releases from artists including Stan Getz, Annie Ross, and Sonny Stitt. One of his early and much-needed financial successes was a release of "Moody's Mood for Love" recorded by King Pleasure, which became a nationwide hit in 1954. In 1953 Charlie Parker recorded for Prestige using the alias "Charlie Chan" to skirt contractual issues.

Weinstock was known for having artists record with almost no rehearsal time, recording large quantities of music from the jazz groups in New York City for Prestige and later its Bluesville, Moodsville, Par, Swingville and Tru-Sound imprints. He would have musicians record on one take, insisting that the additional takes were less spontaneous and that recording engineer Rudy Van Gelder did not need extra takes to adjust balance, and would reuse tapes if he thought that another take was needed. This left very few alternative versions of Prestige recordings. John Lewis and his Modern Jazz Quartet were one of the few able to overcome Weinstock's no-rehearsal practice, for the 1955 release of Concorde and for the 1956 album Django. Sonny Rollins and John Coltrane recorded the album Tenor Madness in 1956, with a saxophone duet that marked the only known recording of the two artists together.

Columbia Records had signed a recording deal with Miles Davis in 1955, but Davis still owed Prestige Records four albums in addition to Miles: The New Miles Davis Quintet, recorded in November 1955 after Davis had already started recording for Columbia. Weinstock had the Miles Davis Quintet record without retakes for two full days at Van Gelder's original recording studio in Hackensack, New Jersey, one in May and one in October 1956, building up a mass of material that was ultimately used to create four separate albums titled Cookin' with The Miles Davis Quintet, Relaxin' with The Miles Davis Quintet, Workin' with The Miles Davis Quintet and Steamin' with The Miles Davis Quintet. These were released over several years, and all achieved critical success. In his autobiography, Davis described the "great music we made at both those sessions" and said that he was "real proud of it", but that he was glad to have fulfilled his obligations to Prestige and was "ready to move on".

Within a few years of the label's establishment, Weinstock hired A&R scouts to bring in and develop talent, and had started the transition to soul jazz with artists such as Charles Earland, Richard "Groove" Holmes and Willis Jackson. Over the years, Weinstock oversaw releases from such artists as Gene Ammons, John Coltrane, Eric Dolphy, Red Garland, Coleman Hawkins, Thelonious Monk, Sonny Rollins and Annie Ross. With as many as 75 recording sessions a year in the 1950s, Prestige released more than 1,000 recordings during Weinstock's 23 years of ownership.

In the mid-1960s, Weinstock relocated Prestige's head office to Bergenfield, New Jersey, just a few miles from his home in Tenafly, New Jersey. He would often prefer to have meetings in his home, feeling that he had more privacy there than at the office.

== Sale to Fantasy ==
In 1972, Weinstock sold Prestige to Fantasy Records and relocated to Florida. He became a stock and commodities investor, and made a brief comeback to the music industry with a record label he formed in the 1990s.

== Death ==
A resident of Deerfield Beach, Florida, Weinstock died at age 77 in a hospice in Boca Raton on January 14, 2006, due to complications of diabetes. He was survived by his three sons, James Weinstock, Bruce Weinstock, and Philip Weinstock, and his ex-wife of 37 years, Joan Weinstock of Sunrise, Florida.
