= Wroxall =

Wroxall may refer to:

- Wroxall, Isle of Wight, England
  - Wroxall Manor, Isle of Wight
- Wroxall railway station, England
- Wroxall, Warwickshire, England
  - Wroxall Abbey, Warwickshire
