= Richmond Shepard =

Mime artist

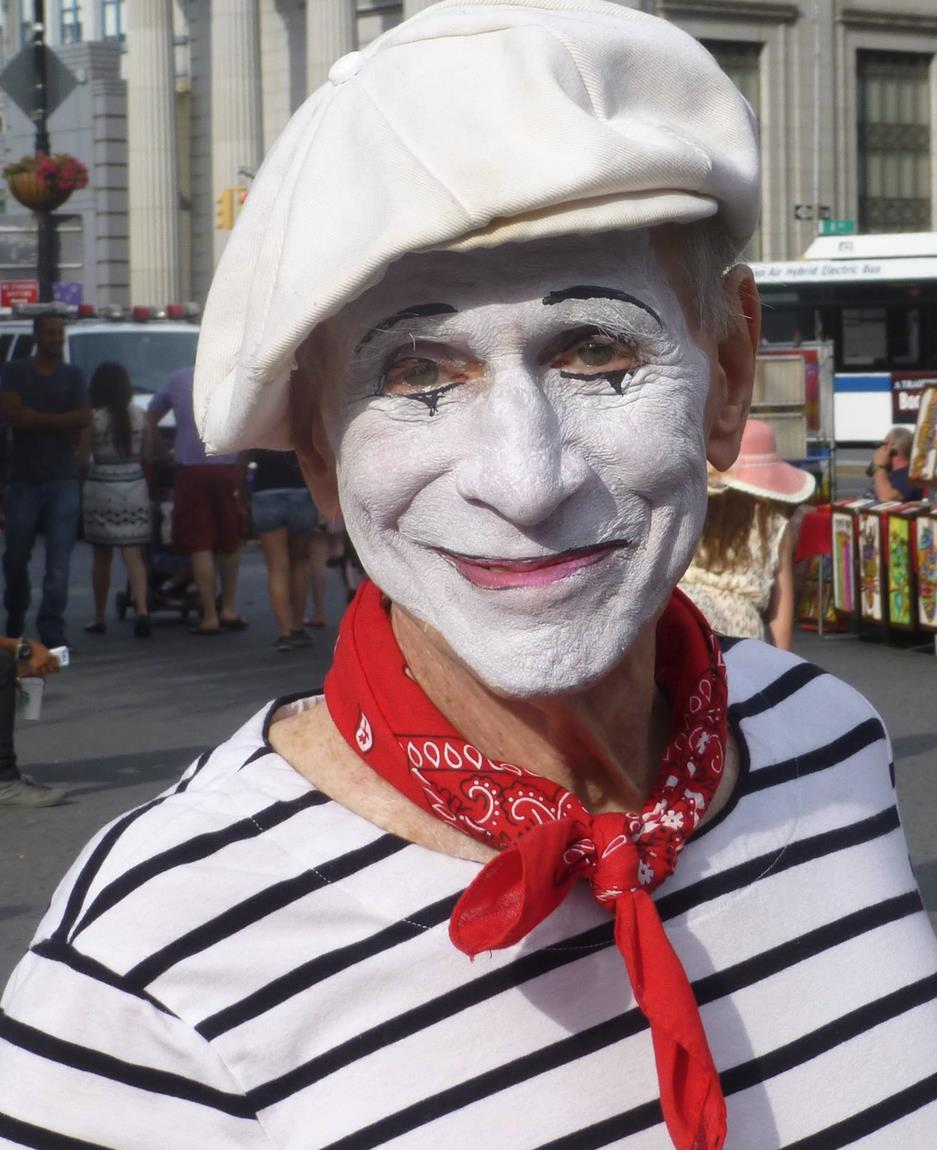
Richmond Shepard, 2014

Richmond Shepard (24 April 1929 – 2 July 2019) was an American writer, director, producer and mime with a 50-year history in entertainment. He was one of the oldest living working mimes in show business. He built, owned and operated his own theaters in Los Angeles on Theatre Row where he produced over 30 shows. He moved to New York and worked as a theatre and film critic for WNEW, conceived and directed the off-Broadway show Noo Yawk Tawk at The Village Gate for three years. He traveled across the world performing with mime troupes and performs improvisational comedy in various clubs around NYC. Richmond Shepard's last role was when he played the "Sandman" in Fuzz on the Lens Productions fantasy comedy Abnormal Attraction starring Malcolm McDowell, Bruce Davison, Leslie Easterbrook, and Gilbert Gottfried which was released on 26 February 2019.

== Personal life ==
Shepard was born in New York City. He was married to a woman named Hadria Shepard. They had four daughters: Armina, Rosetta (now Brianna), Luana and rock singer Vonda Shepard. He gained custody of the children when the couple separated in 1974. He also had 4 grandchildren: Gavin, Hannah, Dexter and Jack.

== The Richmond Shepard Theater ==
Shepard previously owned The Writer Act Repertoire, an Off-Broadway theatre located at the original venue of The Vineyard Theater, 309 East 26th Street, New York City, located at the Kips Bay Court apartment complex in the Kips Bay neighborhood of Manhattan. Notable performances include the world premiere of Last Chance Romance by American playwright Sam Bobrick (June 2011) and a developmental staging of the comedy, Shalom Dammit! An Evening with Rabbi Sol Solomon (March 2012). The theater has been renamed the Write Act Repertory Theatre, owned by Write Act Repertory.

Shepard owned an additional Richmond Shepard Theater in The Complex in Hollywood, California from the late 1970s to 1990.
