= Ubari Landscape Conservation Area =

Protected area in Estonia

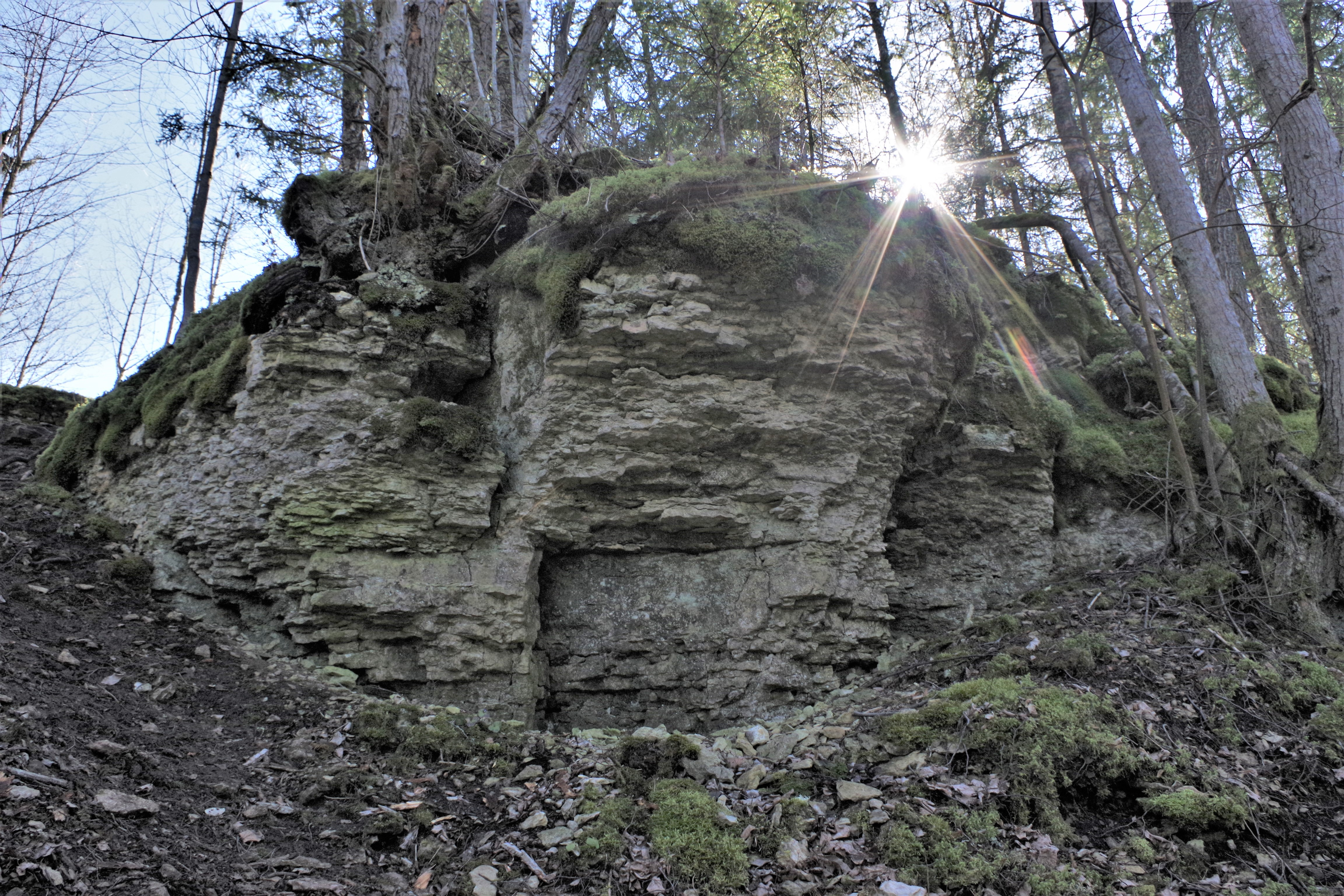

- Location within Estonia
- Location: Estonia
- Coordinates: 59°29′30″N 25°17′30″E
- Area: 59 ha (150 acres)
- Established: 2005

Ubari Landscape Conservation Area is a nature park which is located in Harju County, Estonia.

The area of the nature park is 59 ha.

The protected area was founded in 2005 to protect North Estonia Klint and broadleaved forest communities in Jõelähtme Parish (Kaberneeme and Haapse village).
