= Noo Yawk Tawk =

Play by Richmond Shepard

Noo Yawk Tawk was an off-Broadway show conceived and directed by Richmond Shepard which played at The Village Gate Theater from 1988 to 1991. It featured members of an improvisational comedy troupe founded by Mr. Shepard. All performances were entirely improvised. Characters may have been repeated but never the sketches or the dialogue. The audience set the conditions for each improvisation so every performance was different. The sketches were based on improvisational games which included poems, songs, a fictitious foreign movie and a scene which included the first and last line all given by audience members. The cast members used their skills of foreign accents, dialects, singing, mime and writing.

In 1991, the group branched out and another troupe was formed to perform at the Top Of The Gate, a club run by Manny Roth, former manager of the Village Gate. Roth persuaded Stan Taffel to create and take charge of the new group. Speakeasy played to packed houses until 1993 and moved to other venues before Taffel joined the off-Broadway company of The News In Revue. Three members of the troupe, Stan Taffel, Miguel Sierra and Kim Cea were hired for a new animated series, The Toysters, which had a run of thirteen episodes and was seen in foreign countries.

== Cast ==
- Richmond Shepard
- Stan Taffel
- Marc Kudisch
- Debra Wilson
- Indira Stefanianna Christopherson
- Eric Douglas
- Bonnie Comley
- Ken Dashow
- Doug Katsaros
- Garry Goodrow
- Nola Roeper
- Michael Cooke
- Miguel Sierra
- Kim Cea
- Rafael D’Lugoff
- Lili Schlossberg
- Jessie Janet Richards
- Pauline Frommer
