= Wroxall Manor =

Manor house on the Isle of Wight, England

Wroxall Manor (also Warochesselle, Wrockeshal, Wroxhale) was a manor house on the Isle of Wight, situated in the Newchurch parish.

== History ==
It was held before the Conquest by Countess Gytha (Gueda) of her husband Earl Godwin as a free manor, and at the time of the Domesday Book was in the king's hands, being one of the most valuable holdings in the Island. It belonged to the lords of the Island, and passed on the death of Isabel de Fortibus in 1293 to Edward I, who leased it in 1304–5 for life to Matthew son of John. Matthew died about 1308 and in 1309 the manor was granted by Edward II to Piers de Gaveston and his wife Margaret, the king's niece, on whom the lordship of the Island had been conferred, but in the same year they restored it to the king. The manor was evidently granted with the lordship of the Island to Edward, Earl of Chester, and was given in 1355 to the Princess Isabel for life. It remained a Crown possession until 1624, when James I granted it with Apse Manor and Bleakdown Manor to Edward Ramsey. He sold it in the same year to Richard Baskett, who held the manor courts from 1627 to 1634. At the end of the century it was in the hands of the Hopson family. It afterwards came to Thomas Cotele, and passed from him with Niton to Lord Mount Edgcumbe, who owned it in 1771, when it was divided into North and South Wroxall; the former, comprising Winford, Queen Bower, Borthwood and Hill Farms, was sold in different lots in 1787. The latter, including Wroxall Farm and Hide Place, also put up for sale in 1787, was bought in for Lord Mount Edgcumbe. (The whole has since been split up and is now in the hands of numerous owners.

In the reign of Henry II, Richard Earl of Devon bequeathed to the monks of Quarr Abbey twenty solidates of land in his manor of Wroxall. The land was confirmed to the abbey by Isabel de Fortibus and her grant was confirmed by the king in 1333. Nothing further is known about the holding.
