= Les McCann Ltd. Plays the Shampoo =

Live album by Les McCann Ltd.
- Released: 1963
- Recorded: December 29, 1961; The Village Gate, New York City, NY
- Genre: Jazz
- Length: 37:11
- Label: Pacific Jazz; PJ 63
- Producer: Richard Bock

Les McCann chronology
Les McCann Ltd. in New York (1961)	Les McCann Ltd. Plays the Shampoo (1963)	New from the Big City (1961)

Les McCann Ltd. Plays the Shampoo (subtitled At the Village Gate) is a live album by pianist Les McCann recorded in 1961 and released on the Pacific Jazz label. The album was recorded at the same residency as Les McCann Ltd. in New York but not released until 1963.

== Reception ==
Professional ratings
Review scores
Source	Rating
Allmusic	3/5 stars

Allmusic rated the album 3 stars.

== Track listing ==
All compositions by Les McCann except as indicated

1. "The Shampoo" - 4:08
2. "Too Close for Comfort" (Jerry Bock, George David Weiss, Larry Holofcener) - 4:53
3. "You I Thought I Knew" - 7:00
4. "Woody 'n You" (Dizzy Gillespie) - 3:08
5. "Someone Stole My Chitlins" - 3:58
6. "Out of This World" (Harold Arlen, Johnny Mercer) - 5:28
7. "Filet of Soul" - 3:26
8. "Smile Stacey" - 5:10

== Personnel ==
- Les McCann - piano
- Herbie Lewis - bass
- Ron Jefferson - drums
