= Richard J. Simpson =

Richard Simpson is a professor in the department of biochemistry at La Trobe University (Melbourne, Australia). He is the inaugural and current president of the Australasian Proteomics Society and a past treasurer of the Human Proteome Organization. Simpson was elected Honorary Member of the American Society of Biochemistry and Molecular Biology in 1996, awarded the AMRAD Pharmacia Medal from the Australian Society for Biochemistry & Molecular Biology, and was an elected councillor of the Protein Society (1993-1996). In 1995, Simpson was elected Fellow of the Australian Academy of Technological Sciences and Engineering and in 2001 was awarded the Centenary Medal "For service to Australian society in research and development".
