= New from the Big City =

Live album by Les McCann Ltd.
- Released: 1970
- Recorded: Unknown; New York City
- Venue: The Village Gate
- Genre: Jazz
- Length: 37:59
- Label: Pacific Jazz; PJ 20173
- Producer: Richard Bock

Les McCann chronology
Les McCann Ltd. Plays the Shampoo (1961)	New from the Big City (1970)	Stormy Monday (1962)

New from the Big City is an album by pianist Les McCann released on the Pacific Jazz label in 1970.

== Track listing ==
All compositions by Les McCann except as indicated

1. "Gus Gus" – 2:45
2. "Big City" (Marvin Jenkins) – 3:08
3. "Come Back Baby" (Ray Charles) – 2:56
4. "Steady Trompin'" – 4:35
5. "Bill Bailey Won't You Please Come Home" (Traditional) – 4:45
6. "The Girl from Ipanema" (Antônio Carlos Jobim, Vinicius de Moraes, Norman Gimbel) – 2:55
7. "Tenderly" (Jack Lawrence, Walter Gross) – 6:05
8. "Beaux J. Poo Boo" – 8:10
9. "Kathleen's Theme" – 2:40

== Personnel ==
- Les McCann – piano, vocals
- Herbie Lewis – bass
- Ron Jefferson – drums
