= Les McCann Ltd. in New York =

Live album by Les McCann Ltd. with Stanley Turrentine and Blue Mitchell
- Released: 1962
- Recorded: December 28, 1961; The Village Gate, New York City, NY
- Genre: Jazz
- Length: 38:35
- Label: Pacific Jazz; PJ 45
- Producer: Richard Bock

Les McCann chronology
Les McCann Sings (1961)	Les McCann Ltd. in New York (1962)	Les McCann Ltd. Plays the Shampoo (1961)

Les McCann Ltd. in New York is a live album by pianist Les McCann recorded in 1961 and released on the Pacific Jazz label.

== Reception ==
Professional ratings
Review scores
Source	Rating
Allmusic	4/5 stars

The Allmusic review by Mark Allan called the album: "A thoroughly satisfying live date".

== Track listing ==
All compositions by Les McCann except as indicated

1. "Chip Monck" – 7:45
2. "Fayth, You're..." – 6:10
3. "Cha Cha Twist" – 7:38
4. "A Little ¾ for God & Co." – 9:24
5. "Maxie's Changes" – 8:51
6. "Someone Stole My Chitlins" – 5:10 :Bonus track on CD reissue
7. "One More Hamhock Please" (Curtis Amy) – 8:56 :Bonus track on CD reissue
8. "Oat Meal" (McCann, Hutcherson) – 4:57 :Bonus track on CD reissue
- Recorded at the Village Gate in NYC on December 28, 1961 (tracks 1–6) and at Pacific Jazz Studios in Hollywood, CA in late 1960 (tracks 7 & 8). Tracks 7 and 8 originally issued in edited form as Pacific Jazz X-316 (45 rpm single).

== Personnel ==
- Les McCann – piano
- Stanley Turrentine – tenor saxophone (tracks 1–6)
- Blue Mitchell – trumpet (tracks 1–6; solo: tracks 3–6)
- Frank Haynes – tenor saxophone (tracks 1–6; solo: tracks 5–6) note: Haynes' name is misspelled on the album cover
- Herbie Lewis – bass
- Ron Jefferson – drums
- Curtis Amy – tenor saxophone (track 7)
- Bobby Hutcherson – vibraphone (tracks 7–8)
