= Apsey Beach =

- Unincorporated community
- Interactive map of Apsey Beach
- Coordinates: 49°02′00″N 58°05′57″W
- Country: Canada
- Province: Newfoundland and Labrador
- Time zone: UTC-3:30 (Newfoundland Time)
  - Summer (DST): UTC-2:30 (Newfoundland Daylight)
- Area code: 709

Apsey Beach is a fishing settlement of the Bay of Islands on the north side of Humber Arm in the St. George District in the Canadian province of Newfoundland and Labrador.

== See also ==
- List of communities in Newfoundland and Labrador
