= Sketches of Spain =

1960 studio album by Miles Davis

Studio album by Miles Davis
- Released: July 18, 1960
- Recorded: November 15 & 20, 1959 and March 10, 1960
- Studios: Columbia 30th Street Studio, New York City
- Genres: Third stream; orchestral jazz; Spanish classical music
- Length: 41:19
- Label: Columbia
- Producer: Teo Macero

Miles Davis chronology
Workin' with the Miles Davis Quintet (1960)	Sketches of Spain (1960)	Steamin' with the Miles Davis Quintet (1961)

Sketches of Spain is a studio album by American jazz musician Miles Davis, released on July 18, 1960, by Columbia Records. Recording took place between November 1959 and March 1960 at Columbia's 30th Street Studio in New York City. An extended version of the second movement of Joaquín Rodrigo's Concierto de Aranjuez (1939) is included, as well as a piece called "Will o' the Wisp", from Manuel de Falla's ballet El amor brujo (1914–1915). Sketches of Spain is regarded as an exemplary recording of third stream, a musical fusion of jazz, European classical, and styles from world music.

== Background ==
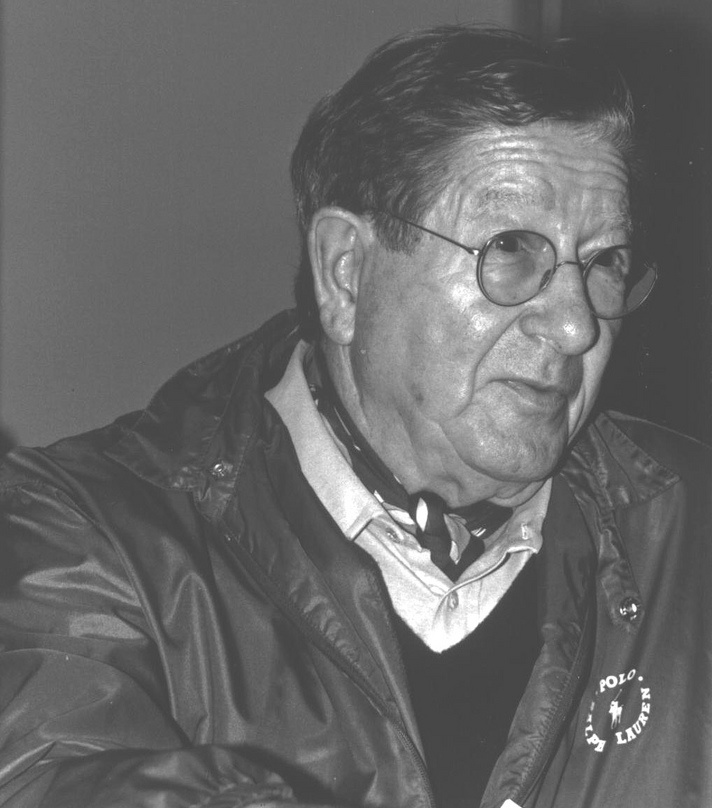
Sketches of Spain is the first of many albums by Miles Davis to be produced by Teo Macero.

Miles Davis's wife Frances insisted he accompany her to a performance by flamenco dancer Roberto Iglesias. Inspired by the performance, Davis bought every flamenco album he could buy from the Colony Records shop in New York City.

The album pairs Davis with arranger and composer Gil Evans, with whom he had collaborated on several other projects, on a program of compositions largely derived from the Spanish folk tradition. Evans explained:

[We] hadn't intended to make a Spanish album. We were just going to do the Concierto de Aranjuez. A friend of Miles gave him the only album in existence with that piece. He brought it back to New York and I copied the music off the record because there was no score. By the time we did that, we began to listen to other folk music, music played in clubs in Spain... So we learned a lot from that and it ended up being a Spanish album. The Rodrigo, the melody is so beautiful. It's such a strong song. I was so thrilled with that.

The folk songs in the album were inspired by recordings made by Alan Lomax in Galicia and Andalusia, which were released in 1955 by Columbia Masterworks. Sketches of Spain album was also the first Miles Davis album to be produced by Teo Macero, who would later produce many of Davis's works.

== Concierto de Aranjuez ==
The opening piece, taking up almost half the record, is an arrangement by Gil Evans and Miles Davis of the adagio movement of Concierto de Aranjuez, a concerto for guitar by the contemporary Spanish composer Joaquín Rodrigo. Following the faithful introduction of the concerto's guitar melody on flugelhorn, Evans's arrangement turns into a "quasi-symphonic, quasi-jazz world of sound", according to his biographer. The middle of the piece contains a "chorus" by Evans unrelated to the concerto but "echoed" in the other pieces on the album. The original melody then reappears in a darker mode.

Davis plays flugelhorn and later trumpet, attempting to connect the various settings musically. Davis commented at rehearsal, "The thing I have to do now is make things connect, make them mean something in what I play around it". Davis thought the concerto's adagio melody was "so strong" that "the softer you play it, the stronger it gets, and the stronger you play it, the weaker it gets", and Evans concurred.

According to Davis's biographer Jack Chambers, the contemporary critical response to the arrangement was not surprising, especially given the scarcity of anything resembling a jazz rhythm in most of the piece. Martin Williams wrote that "the recording is something of a curiosity and a failure, as I think a comparison with any good performance of the movement by a classical guitarist would confirm". The composer Rodrigo was also not impressed, but royalties from the arrangement brought him "a lot of money", according to Evans.

Davis had not sought permission to record the Concierto from Joaquín Rodrigo, the piece's composer, and the label did not attempt to seek his permission. Rodrigo's wife, Victoria Kamhi in her memoir described the recording as "an act of piracy." Rodrigo tried unsuccessfully to sue the Spanish Society of Authors and Publishers (SGAE) for authorising Davis' version, but lost on the basis that Davis had granted author's rights to Rodrigo, despite not having sought permission. "Rodrigo changed his mind and came to accept the subsequent jazz recordings of his music in part because the legal terms of use were resolved (Ediciones Joaquín Rodrigo now owns the Gil Evans arrangement), but also in part because these versions, far from obliterating the original guitar concerto, have helped disseminate it."

== Critical reception ==
Professional ratings
Review scores
Source	Rating
AllMusic	5/5 stars
DownBeat	5/5 stars
The Encyclopedia of Popular Music	5/5 stars
MusicHound Jazz	4.5/5 stars
The Penguin Guide to Jazz	3.5/4 stars
Pitchfork	10/10
PopMatters	10/10
Q	5/5 stars
The Rolling Stone Album Guide	5/5 stars
Sputnikmusic	4/5

In a contemporary review for DownBeat, Bill Mathieu hailed Sketches of Spain as one of the 20th century's most important musical works so far and a highly intellectual yet passionate record. He found Evans's compositions extremely well crafted and Davis's playing intelligently devised, concluding in his review, "if there is to be a new jazz, a shape of things to come, then this is the beginning." Replying to suggestions that Sketches of Spain was something other than jazz, Davis said "it's music, and I like it." In The Rolling Stone Album Guide (2004), J. D. Considine called it "a work of unparalleled grace and lyricism," while Q magazine said it "took orchestral jazz in a new direction." Robert Christgau was less enthusiastic about the record and recalled being a young listener when it was released: "In 1960 [it] catapulted Davis into the favor of the kind of man who reads Playboy and initiated in me one phase of the disillusionment with jazz that resulted in my return to rock and roll."

For Sketches of Spain, Evans and Davis won the 1961 Grammy Award for Best Jazz Composition of More Than Five Minutes Duration. They were also nominated for Best Jazz Performance Large Group. The album was ranked number 358 on Rolling Stone's list of the 500 greatest albums of all time.

== Track listing ==
Side one
No.	Title	Writer(s)	Length
1.	"Concierto de Aranjuez (Adagio)"	Joaquín Rodrigo	16:19
2.	"Will o' the Wisp"	Manuel de Falla	3:47
Total length:			20:06

Side two
No.	Title	Writer(s)	Length
1.	"The Pan Piper (Alborada de Vigo)"	Traditional, Gil Evans	3:52
2.	"Saeta"	Traditional, Gil Evans	5:06
3.	"Solea"	Gil Evans	12:15
Total length:			21:13 41:19

- Sides one and two were combined as tracks 1–5 on CD reissues.

1997 reissue bonus tracks
No.	Title	Writer(s)	Length
6.	"Song of Our Country"	Heitor Villa-Lobos; arranged by Gil Evans	3:23
7.	"Concierto de Aranjuez" (alternate take; part 1)	Joaquín Rodrigo	12:04
8.	"Concierto de Aranjuez" (alternate take; part 2 ending)	Joaquín Rodrigo	3:33
Total length:			60:39

== Song title meanings ==
1. Concierto de Aranjuez was written about the gardens at the Royal Palace of Aranjuez.
2. El amor brujo is often translated as "The Bewitched Love." It is a ballet by Spanish composer Manuel de Falla.
3. "The Pan Piper" refers to the instrument (pan flute) played by a pig's castrator and knife grinder and the melody he used to play when arriving to villages in Galicia. "Alborada" is a traditional folk style from Galicia.
4. "Saeta" is a type of religious song mostly sung during the Semana Santa (Holy Week) processions in Spain.
5. "Solea" is a form of flamenco music.

== Personnel ==
- Miles Davis – arranger, trumpet, flugelhorn
- Gil Evans – arranger, conductor
- Johnny Coles – trumpet
- Bernie Glow – trumpet
- Taft Jordan – trumpet
- Louis Mucci – trumpet
- Ernie Royal – trumpet
- John Barrows – French horn
- James Buffington – French horn
- Earl Chapin – French horn
- Tony Miranda – French horn
- Joe Singer – French horn
- Dick Hixon – trombone
- Frank Rehak – trombone
- Bill Barber – tuba
- Jimmy McAllister – tuba
- Danny Bank – bass clarinet
- Albert Block – flute
- Eddie Caine – flute
- Harold Feldman – clarinet, flute, oboe
- Romeo Penque – oboe
- Jack Knitzer – bassoon
- Paul Chambers – bass
- Jimmy Cobb – drums
- Elvin Jones – percussion
- Janet Putnam – harp
- José Mangual Sr. – castanets (track 1–2)
- Elden "Buster" Bailey – percussion (tracks 3–5)

== Certifications and sales ==
Region	Certification	Certified units/sales
United Kingdom (BPI) sales since 1997	Silver	60,000^{^}
United States (RIAA)	Platinum	861,000
^{^} Shipments figures based on certification alone.
