= Apsey Green =

Coordinates: 52.222123°N 1.326967°E

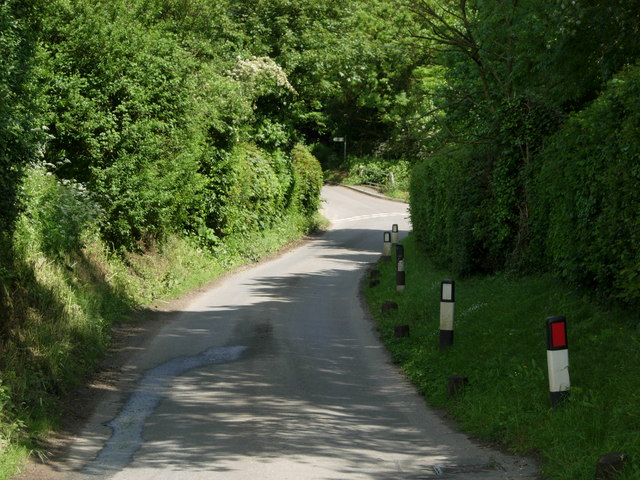

- Location within Suffolk
- OS grid reference: TM2763
- Shire county: Suffolk
- Region: East
- Country: England
- Sovereign state: United Kingdom
- Police: Suffolk
- Fire: Suffolk
- Ambulance: East of England

Apsey Green is a hamlet in Suffolk, England.
