= Marvin Koner =

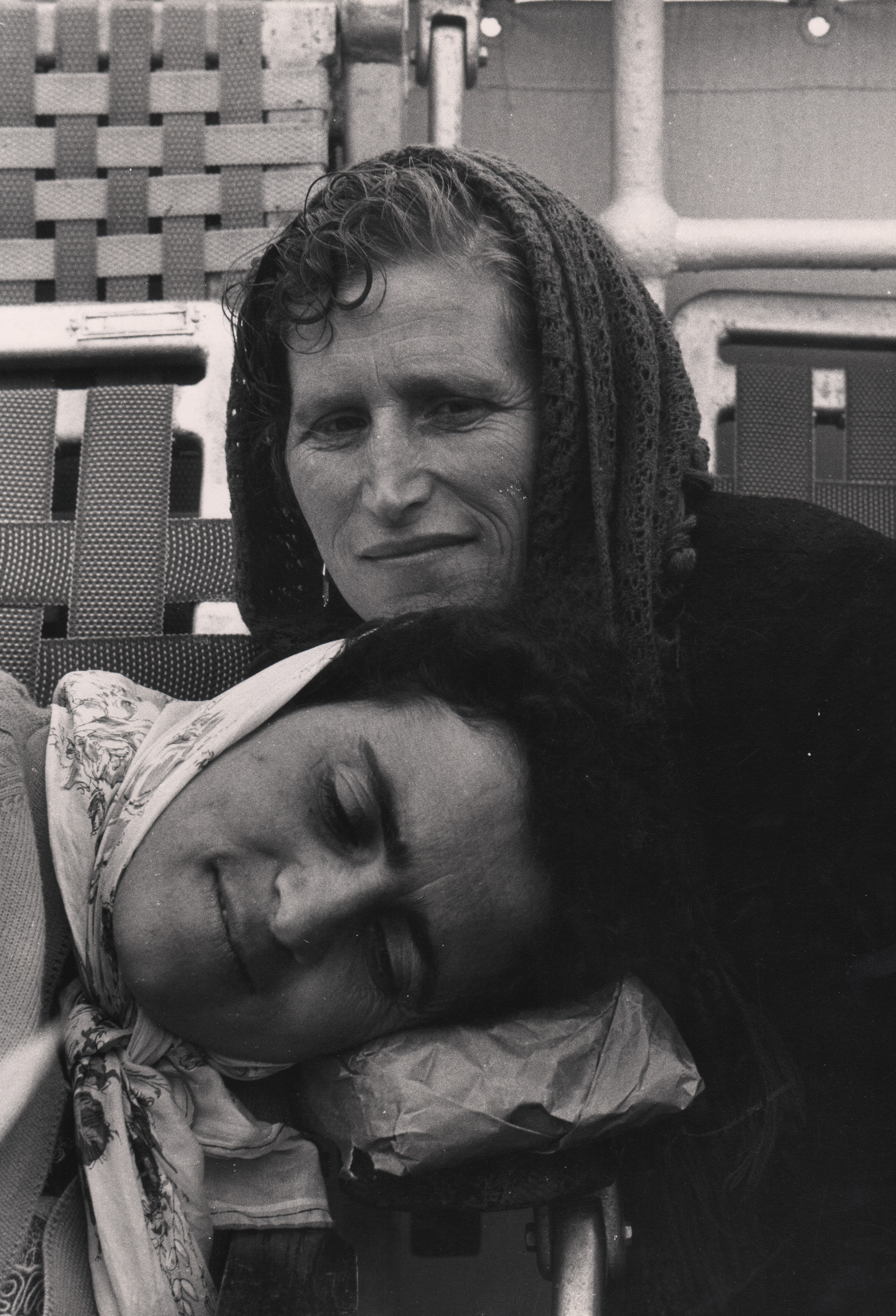

Marvin Koner (1921-1983) was an American photographer who became known for his photographs of Johnny Cash and Miles Davis which he published in Pageant and other magazines.

For nearly four decades, American photojournalist Marvin Koner, traveled the world capturing the people, places and personalities that shaped the latter half of the 20th century.

Marvin Koner was born into a family of Russian intellectuals in New York City.

Stationed in the South Pacific during World War II, Koner served as a First Lieutenant in the Army Photo Intelligence Unit where his interest in photography began. At the end of the war he returned to New York determined to make a career in photography, and enabled by the G.I. Bill, studied with Alexy Brodovitch, the renowned art director of Harper's Bazaar Magazine.

Spearheading the use of the 35mm. camera and available light, for the next 30 years, Koner's work appeared in leading magazines, including Life, Fortune, Look, Esquire and Collier's. During the course of his career Koner received numerous awards from professional journals and served a number of terms as Vice-President of The American Association of Magazine Photographers.

Koner photographed many distinguished subjects, most notably Martin Luther King, Robert Frost, Margaret Mead, Robert Kennedy, Frank Lloyd Wright and Eleanor Roosevelt. Always eager to tell a story, Koner photographically retraced James Joyce's "Ulysses" main character, Leopold Bloom's journey through Dublin, covered the exchange of prisoners at the end of the Korean war for Collier'sMagazine, and in the early 1960s followed the migration by boat, of an Italian family to New York. When the interest in photojournalism diminished and virtually disappeared, Koner turned from magazines to corporate photography on an international scale. His color images of industry, architecture, nature and portraiture have been published worldwide.

Marvin Koner died in 1983 at the age of 62. His photographs are in the permanent collections of The Metropolitan Museum of Art, the Museum of Modern Art and the International Center for Photography, where a one-man show of his work was held in 1993.

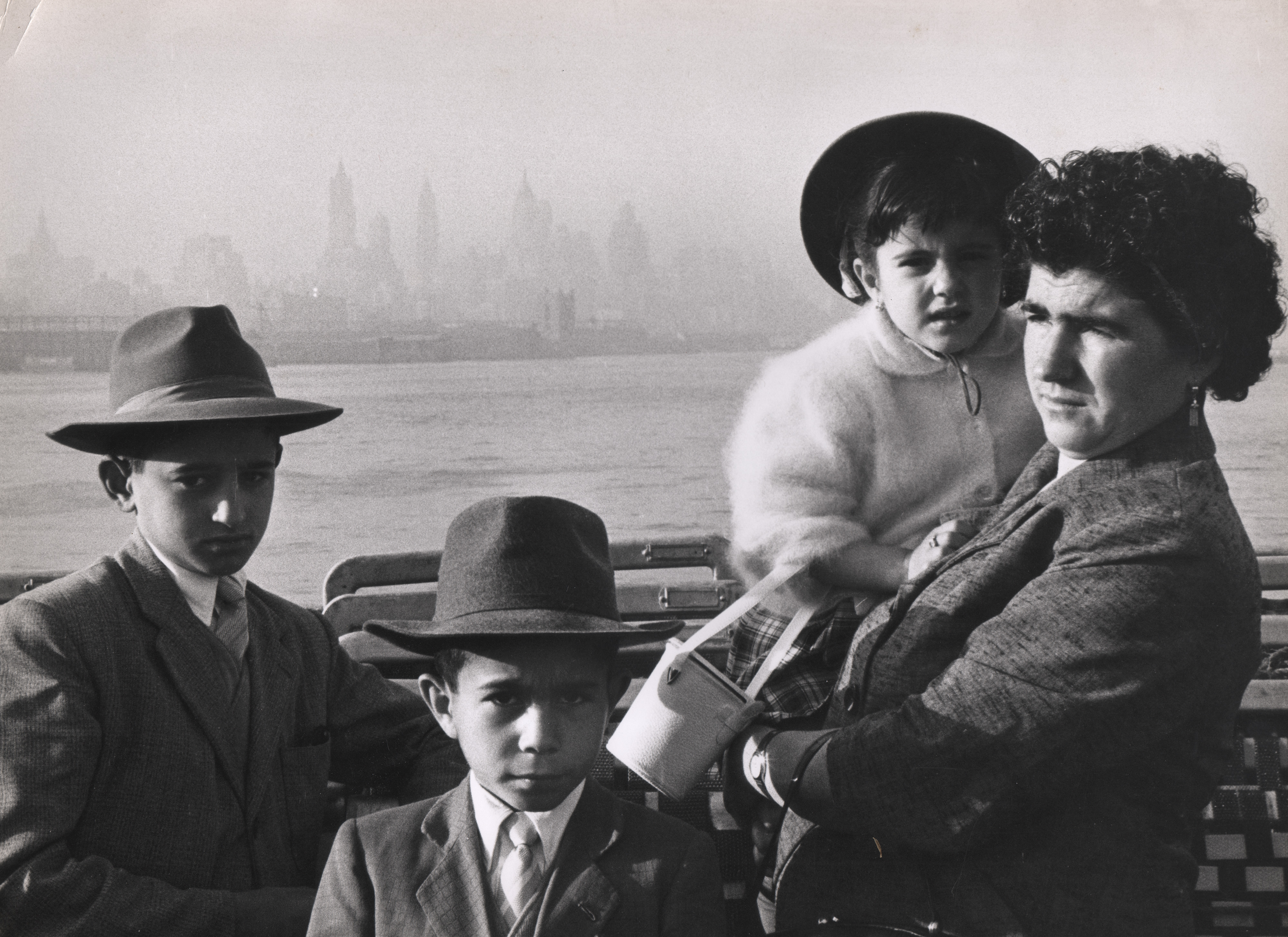
Italian Immigrants 1957

He is survived by his wife, Silvia Koner, former articles editor of Redbook Magazine and his daughter, Pam Koner, founder and executive director of the non-profit, Family-to-Family, Inc. (www.family-to-family.org).

A complete selection of his work can be found at: www.marvinkonerarchive.com

Miles Davis, Marvin Koner
