= Application Packaging Standard =

The Application Packaging Standard (APS) was a standard that defines a technology for integrating application software with hosting platforms. Integration of an application with hosting platforms is implemented by creating an APS package for this application, and APS package deployment creates an APS application.

Free APS Standard was EOL'd by Cloudblue in January, 2020

== Participants ==
APS involves three types of participants into the integration process:

- Independent software vendors (ISVs) use APS to make their applications available to numerous hosting providers and through them to huge number of customers. This is an effective way to convert an application to SaaS.
- Hosting providers need APS to extend the list of hosted services and integrate them to each other thus making their services much more valuable and attractive for their customers.
- Customers get benefit of consuming APS application services.

== Versions ==
APS went through two stages.

APS 1 emerged as a way for creating predominantly two types of APS packages and respectively two types of APS applications:

- APS site application is installed for each customer who needs the application services. In this case, each customer may have own application instance. APS package carries the site application inside.
- APS external application implies sharing a single cloud application for many customers who can get access to the application services as application tenants. APS package contains the integration components of the application, but not the application itself.

APS 2 added flexibility to integrate applications not only with hosting platforms but also with each other. APS 2 makes it possible to create custom user interface in hosting platforms for managing the integrated applications.

== Implementations ==
The following is a list of notable web hosting platforms allowed installations of APS packages:

- Plesk
- 1&1 Internet

== Application catalog ==
The catalog page now redirects to XaaS Simplified from CloudBlue, and started to be inaccessible around 2020 APS packages were available for download at application catalog. ISVs could make their applications publicly available by uploading them to this catalog.

== See also ==
- Web hosting control panel
- Software as a service
