= Australasian Proteomics Society =

The Australasian Proteomics Society (APS) is a learned society formed in 2004 from the Lorne Proteomics Symposia (LPS) meetings. The APS was expanded to include the Australian Electrophoresis and Proteomics Society (a society formed in 1994 in Sydney, Australia and originally called the Australian Electrophoresis Society, part of the International Council of Electrophoresis Societies). The Lorne Proteomics Symposia meetings can trace their roots to the original Specialist Protein Analysis Workshop (SPAW) founded by Robert L. Moritz and Richard J. Simpson. These meetings began in 1994 as an offshoot of the Lorne Protein Meeting. (established in 1974) to address the needs of protein purification and analysis technologies rapidly under development in the 1980s. The founding president and vice president were Simpson and Moritz. The current president is Stuart Cordwell. In 2004, an Australasia-wide committee was formed to fully disseminate the activities of the APS and provide a regional society to include New Zealand and other interested Asian countries to be a focal hub in the Pacific for the Human Proteome Organization. The aims of the APS are to promote and facilitate proteomics research and related topics. The APS acts a liaison body for communication with state and federal government as well as a central point for the coordination of proteome-related programmes and resources. The APS is a member of the Asia Oceania Human Proteome Organization.

== Meetings ==
The APS organizes a four-day annual meeting called the Lorne Proteomics Symposium, traditional starting on the first Thursday of February, in Lorne, Victoria. In addition, the APS is active in organizing other symposia both in Australia and in New Zealand.
