= Just Squeeze Me (But Please Don't Tease Me) =

Jazz standard

"Just Squeeze Me (But Please Don't Tease Me)" is a 1941 popular song composed by Duke Ellington, with lyrics by Lee Gaines. The song has been recorded numerous times by a number of artists in the years since, having become a jazz standard. Hit recordings have been by Paul Weston & His Orchestra (vocal by Matt Dennis) (reached No. 21 in the Billboard charts in 1947) and by The Four Aces (No. 20 in 1952).

== Other notable recordings ==
- Louis Armstrong – originally recorded with Duke Ellington in 1961 for an album called The Great Reunion and later included in the compilation CD The Great Summit (2001)
- Dave Brubeck
- Chris Connor – A Jazz Date With Chris Connor (1958)
- Miles Davis – Miles: The New Miles Davis Quintet (1955)
- Ella Fitzgerald – Ella Fitzgerald Sings the Duke Ellington Songbook (1957)
- Marvin Gaye and Mary Wells – Together (1964)
- Dave Grusin – Homage to Duke (1993)
- Joni James – The Mood Is Romance (1961).
- Diana Krall – for her album Only Trust Your Heart (1995)
- Peggy Lee – included on her album Olé ala Lee (1961)
