= X.445 =

The X.445 is an ITU-T standard for sending X.400 traffic over standard telephone lines, a method known commonly as dial-up. It is also known as the Asynchronous Protocol Specification (APS).

== See also ==
- ITU-T, a list of current ITU-T standards
