= Haapse =

Village in Estonia

Coordinates: 59°30′N 25°18′E

- Village
- Interactive map of Haapse
- Country: Estonia
- County: Harju County
- Parish: Jõelähtme Parish
- Time zone: UTC+2 (EET)
  - Summer (DST): UTC+3 (EEST)

Haapse is a village in Jõelähtme Parish, Harju County in northern Estonia.
