= George Avakian =

American record producer (1919–2017)

- Born: Kevork Mesrop Avakian; March 15, 1919; Armavir, Russia
- Died: November 22, 2017 (aged 98); New York City, U.S.
- Education: Horace Mann School Yale University
- Years active: 1939–2000
- Spouse: Anahid Ajemian (1948–2016)
- Children: 3
- Musical career
- Genres: Jazz, pop
- Occupation: Record producer
- Labels: Columbia, Warner Bros., RCA Victor

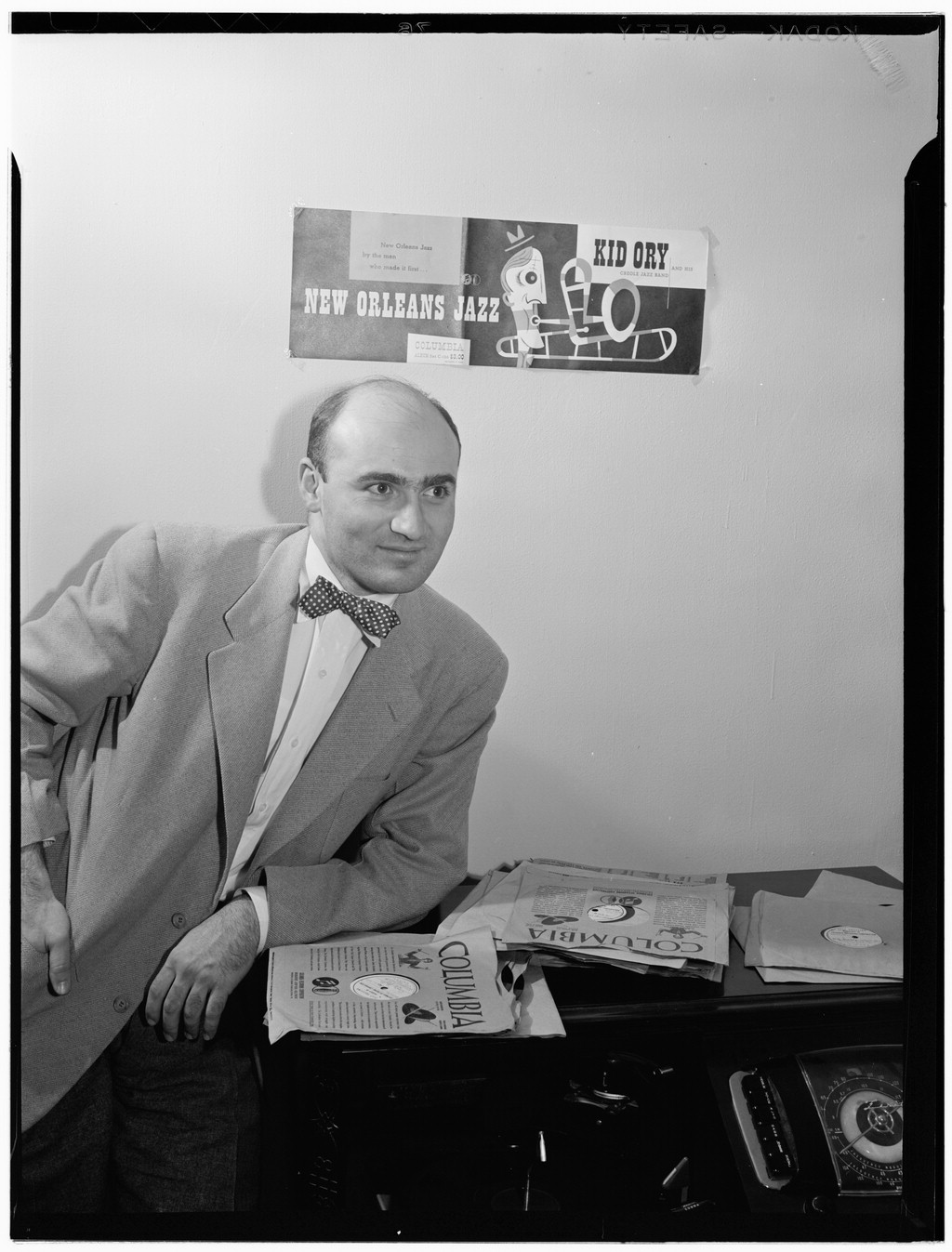
Promotional photo of George Avakian for Hot Jazz Classics Series, 1946

George Mesrop Avakian (Note: Armenian: Ջորջ (Գևորգ) Ավագյան; Russian: Геворк Авакян, romanized: Gevork Avakyan.) (March 15, 1919 – November 22, 2017) was an American record producer, artist manager, writer, educator and executive. Best known for his work from 1939 to the early 1960s at Decca Records, Columbia Records, World Pacific Records, Warner Bros. Records, and RCA Records, he was a major force in the expansion and development of the U.S. recording industry. Avakian functioned as an independent producer and manager from the 1960s to the early 2000s and worked with artists such as Louis Armstrong, Miles Davis, Duke Ellington, Benny Goodman, Dave Brubeck, Eddie Condon, Keith Jarrett, Erroll Garner, Buck Clayton, Sonny Rollins, Paul Desmond, Edith Piaf, Bob Newhart, Johnny Mathis, John Cage, Alan Hovhaness, Ravi Shankar, and many other notable jazz musicians and composers.

== Biography ==
=== Early life and career ===
Avakian was born in 1919 in Armavir, Russia, to Armenian parents, Mesrop and Manoushak Avakian; the family moved to the United States in July 1923 as first cabin class passengers on the S/S Argentina, sailing from Trieste to New York. His younger brother was the photographer and filmmaker Aram Avakian (1926–1987). George Avakian became a jazz fan in his early teens through listening to the radio at night; his first loves were Duke Ellington, Fletcher Henderson, Fats Waller, the Casa Loma Orchestra, and Benny Goodman, among others. He managed to meet and interview Goodman for the Horace Mann School Record during his senior year. This is when he began amassing his enormous collection of Jazz recordings. He also began writing letters to such companies as Decca and the American Record Corporation (ARC). ARC had acquired the catalogs of the bankrupt OKeh and Brunswick Records labels, both of which had recorded jazz extensively in the 1920s. Avakian began writing letters lobbying them to reissue those recordings.

While Avakian was still at Yale University, Decca Records Jack Kapp responded to his unrelenting letters, hiring him to produce his first recording, Chicago Jazz (1940), featuring musicians such as guitarist Eddie Condon, trumpeter Jimmy McPartland, and drummer George Wettling. This became known as the first "jazz album". It consisted of six 78 rpm records, complete with Avakian's liner note essay providing full credits and background information, and set the template for future jazz releases.

By 1940, the swing era was in full bloom, and the Columbia Broadcasting System wanted to cash in on the craze by featuring the music's origins. Having acquired the bankrupt American Record Corporation, CBS was now the home of much recorded jazz. It decided to form a subsidiary called Columbia Records. The company's president, Edward Wallerstein, asked John Hammond to produce a reissue series. Hammond declined, but he suggested Columbia tap Avakian for the job.

Avakian, in his third year at Yale, leapt at the opportunity to comb through Columbia's vaults in Bridgeport, Connecticut to research and assemble what was to be called the Hot Jazz Classics series. Using the format he established at Decca, Avakian created boxed sets devoted to Louis Armstrong, Bix Beiderbecke, Fletcher Henderson, Bessie Smith, and Billie Holiday, among many others. In the process, he found many unreleased sides and included them in the reissues.

Avakian discovered a number of unreleased Louis Armstrong Hot 5 and Hot 7 sides while researching the first album of the series, King Louis. A strong, decades-long working and personal friendship formed when the young producer brought a few test pressings to play for Armstrong.

While serving in the US Army following his graduation from Yale, he was recalled to the United States in 1944 for special training in European languages at Harvard University. While stationed in Boston, he produced a jazz radio program for the Office of War Information featuring Eddie Condon, James P. Johnson, and Fletcher Henderson, among others. He had also continued to write for such magazines as Down Beat, Jazz Magazine, and Mademoiselle while stationed in the Pacific.

== Columbia Records ==
After the war, he returned to Columbia Records responsible for the Popular Music and International divisions, where he continued production of the Hot Jazz Classics series, as well as the Special Editions and Archives series. In addition to recording jazz and pop artists (such as Sidney Bechet, Arthur Godfrey, Doris Day, and Frank Sinatra), Avakian was assigned the role of head of popular albums, part of which involved issuing the first 100 pop records in the 33 1/3rpm long-playing format, a new technology perfected by Columbia that the company was determined to exploit to the full. Avakian was in the forefront of new methods of production to take advantage of the LP, which represented a marketing innovation no less than a technical one.

At around the same time he returned to Columbia, Avakian also met his wife-to-be, Anahid Ajemian (1925–2016), a violinist who was at the dawn of what would be a major performing and recording career. She and her sister, pianist Maro Ajemian (1921–1978), became great performers and boosters of contemporary music. Both sisters studied at the Institute of Musical Art (later the Juilliard School), launched their careers at New York's Town Hall (in 1940 and 1946), and became interested in contemporary composers. Together and separately, the Ajemians would premiere and make debut recordings of music by composers such as Aram Khatchaturian, John Cage, Alan Hovhaness, Lou Harrison, Ernst Krenek, and Elliott Carter. Avakian and Ajemian married in 1948, and remained so until Anahid's death in 2016.

During this time, Avakian continued to write for magazines, expanding into education in 1948 when he taught one of the first academic jazz history courses at New York University. That same year, Avakian collaborated with Walter Schaap and Charles Delaunay on The New Hot Discography, an English translation and expansion of Delaunay's Hot Discography, the first significant catalog of existing jazz records, originally available only in France. Avakian also financed the first recordings of John Cage and Alan Hovhaness (for Dial Records, after the label had switched from bebop to classical), and was one of the co-founders of the National Association of Recording Arts and Sciences (NARAS, now known as The Recording Academy, and presenters of the Grammy Awards) in 1957; he served as president from 1966 to 1967.

The list of artists with whom Avakian collaborated at Columbia, and later at Pacific Jazz, Warner Brothers, RCA, and as an independent producer, was extensive. In addition to those mentioned, it included Dave Brubeck, Erroll Garner, Mahalia Jackson, Ravi Shankar, Gil Evans, Lotte Lenya, Gerry Mulligan, Art Blakey, Buck Clayton, Eddie Condon, Tony Bennett, Edith Piaf, Johnny Mathis, and Frankie Yankovic. He signed Miles Davis and Dave Brubeck to the label, both of whom had only previously recorded for independents with limited distribution systems.

Beyond the LP, Avakian was innovative in other ways: he made Columbia the first major record company to record live performances of jazz and popular music. It released a 2-LP set of Benny Goodman's 1938 concert at Carnegie Hall in 1950, and recorded Lionel Hampton, Harry James, and Louis Armstrong live. He worked in the studio with Armstrong as well in this period to produce some of the trumpeter's best later recordings, including Louis Armstrong Plays W. C. Handy (1954). From 1956 to 1963, Avakian produced several cornerstone albums recorded live at the Newport Jazz Festival, including Ellington at Newport (1956) and the companion album to the film Jazz On A Summer's Day (1958). He was also one of the first producers of popular music to fully embrace multitrack recording and tape editing techniques, overdubbing Louis Armstrong on the best-selling single "Mack The Knife" in 1955 (he persuaded Armstrong to record it), and overdubbing and editing Miles Davis's Miles Ahead in 1957.

=== Later affiliations ===
In 1958, after an extraordinarily-busy and ground-breaking 12-year run at Columbia, he elected to depart. After a short stint as co-owner of the much smaller Pacific Jazz label, Avakian was invited, along with his former Columbia colleague Jim Conkling, to form a record company for Warner Brothers (at that time the only major film studio not to have its own record label). There, Avakian signed Bob Newhart, producing the first comedy album to win a Best Album Grammy Award. He also signed the Everly Brothers and Bill Haley & His Comets.

Avakian personally financed and produced the first three albums by Alan Hovhaness and John Cage (unrelated to his jobs at Columbia) and, in 1958, presented The 25-Year Retrospective Concert of the Music of John Cage at Town Hall, an event he also recorded and sold independently. The year before, Avakian and Ajemian produced a three-concert series at Town Hall titled Music For Moderns, featuring jazz musicians and modern composers on the same bill, a very unusual venture for its time. The concerts featured Anahid Ajemian, Dimitri Mitropoulos, the Duke Ellington Orchestra, the Modern Jazz Quartet, Mahalia Jackson, Chico Hamilton, the composers Virgil Thomson and Carlos Surinach, pianist William Masselos, violist Walter Trampler, and opera baritone Martial Singher, among others.

In 1960, Avakian left Warners to sign on as manager of popular artists and repertoire for RCA, which gave him the opportunity to work once again with jazz musicians. His roster included Lambert, Hendricks, and Bavan; Paul Desmond; Sonny Rollins (signed by Avakian for an unprecedented sum for a jazz musician); Gary Burton; and, once again, Benny Goodman. In 1962, Avakian planned and accompanied the clarinetist's landmark tour of the USSR, which provided him with valuable experience dealing with the Russians that would come in handy within a few short years.

By late 1962, Avakian was once again feeling the pressure of administering a record label on top of his production work, and he negotiated an independent production deal with RCA Records in which he was hired on a per-project basis, relieving him of the busy work. At the same time, he began to manage and produce his own artists as well, beginning with John Lewis and Gunther Schuller's Orchestra U.S.A. ensemble; singer/songwriter Bob Morrison; and saxophonist Charles Lloyd.

Though most known for jazz and pop album production, Avakian notably involved himself in two theater projects. In 1947, he arranged for a group of musicians under the leadership of the saxophonist Eddie Barefield to perform incidental music for the play A Streetcar Named Desire during its Philadelphia and Broadway runs. In 1965, he was an associate producer of the first Off-Broadway revival of Marc Blitzstein's The Cradle Will Rock, and he personally financed the recording of the cast album (the first complete recording of that show).

As the recording industry moved further away from the music closest to his heart, Avakian left RCA in 1964 and never again held a full-time job at a record label. He began working at Avakian Brothers, and through the rest of the 60s and into the 1970s, he managed to hold down that job while launching and running the high-flying career of Charles Lloyd, as well as that of Lloyd's young pianist, Keith Jarrett. Avakian arranged for the Charles Lloyd Quartet, which also featured Jack DeJohnette and Ron McClure, to be the first small American jazz group to perform in the Soviet Union (at the Tallinn Jazz Festival, 1967); he also produced several very successful Lloyd albums for Atlantic Records. Avakian did even more for Jarrett, arranging record deals, managing tours, and producing albums on Columbia, Atlantic, and Impulse. He also negotiated a contract for Jarrett with Manfred Eicher, the founder of a new German label, ECM Records, for whom Jarrett still records as of 2017.

Throughout his career, Avakian worked hard to foster intercultural exchange between the United States and the Soviet Union. He was the first to record Soviet and American artists together (Pavel Lisitsian Sings Armenian Songs With Maro Ajemian At The Piano, New York Records, recorded in 1957, released in 1960). After organizing the Benny Goodman 1962 tour and Lloyd's successful Tallinn appearance in 1967, Avakian assisted Duke Ellington and the Thad Jones/Mel Lewis orchestras in planning their Soviet visits, befriending many figures in Russian music, such as writer Leonid Pereverzev, bandleader Oleg Lundstrem, and trumpeter Valery Ponomarev. Avakian also sponsored the first performance by Soviet musicians in the United States (at the Village Gate in 1988) and arranged for the Branford Marsalis Quartet to play at the Moscow International Jazz Festival, the debut of American performers at that event, in 1990. For his lifelong efforts, the Soviet Composers Union successfully pushed for Avakian to receive the Order of Lenin, the former Soviet Union's highest honor, in 1990.

From the 1970s to the 2000s, Avakian continued to keep his hand in occasional record productions, and during the 1980s, he managed two vocalists, Helen Merrill and Datevik Hovanesian. In the 1990s and 2000s, Sony Legacy consulted him for the reissues of several Miles Davis and Louis Armstrong albums and compilations. Avakian also remained active in jazz research and writing and discovered several previously unknown Louis Armstrong compositions at the Library of Congress. In 1997, he produced performances and a recording of them by trumpeter Randy Sandke and other musicians (The Re-Discovered Louis and Bix, on Nagel-Heyer Records, 2000).

Avakian and Anahid Ajemian donated their extensive collection of Jazz recordings and memorabilia to the New York Public Library for the Performing Arts at Lincoln Center in 2014. A major exhibit was held there in 2016 entitled Music for Moderns: The Partnership of George Avakian and Anahid Ajemian. Once semi-retired, he became involved in harness racing, owning and breeding several racehorses. Avakian bred champion pacer Presidential Ball.

Avakian died on November 22, 2017, at the age of 98 at his home on the Upper West Side of Manhattan in New York City. The Avakians had three children: Maro, Anahid, and Gregory.

== Honors ==
He is a founding officer of the National Academy of Recording Arts and Sciences (presenters of the Grammy Awards). His awards over the past years include:

- Honorary Doctor of Literature from Colgate University (May 2014)
- 2011 – Added to the American Society of Composers, Authors and Publishers (ASCAP) Jazz Wall of Fame as a Living Legend Giant of Jazz
- 2011 – "The Louie" Award, Louis Armstrong House Museum
- 2010 – National Endowment for the Arts AB Spellman Jazz Advocacy Award. The nations highest honor in Jazz for his work as a Producer, Manager, Critic, Jazz Historian and Educator.
- 2009 – The Trustees Lifetime Achievement Award (Grammy) from the National Association of Recording Arts and Sciences for contributions to the music industry worldwide.
- 2008 – France awarded the rank of Commandeur des Arts et Lettres in recognition of his significant contributions to the arts
- 2006 – Europe's prestigious jazz award, the Django d'Or
- 2006 – The W.C. Handy Heritage Master & Legend Award
- 2005 – The Armenian Professional Society, Professional of the Year
- 2003 – Man of the Year Award, The Sidney Bechet Society
- 2000 – A Lifetime Achievement award from Down Beat magazine
- 1998 – The Benny Carter Award from the American Federation of Jazz Societies
- 1996 – Grammy Award for "Best Album Notes - Miles Davis & Gil Evans - The Complete Columbia Studio Recordings"
- 1990 – The Order of Lenin, the Soviet Union's highest state order.
- 1984 – Knighthood from the Knights of Malta
- 1981 – President's Citation, New Jersey Jazz Society
- 1966-1967 - President of NARAS
- 1957 - Founding officer of NARAS (Recording Academy)
