= Juanita Boisseau =

American dancer

- Other names: Juanita Boisseau Ramseur
- Occupation: Dancer

Juanita Boisseau (1911 - 2012), also known as Juanita Boisseau Ramseur, was an American dancer. She is best known for starring at the world famous jazz club Cotton Club in New York.

== Life ==
Boisseau was born on July 22, 1911. At the age of nine she won her first dance contest doing the Charleston. Her first professional engagement was in a Broadway musical revue Black Birds of 1928 where she started out as chorus girl.

Boisseau was married to Frederick D. Ramseur, who died in 2000. Her son is Sterling Bough, a dancer, singer, actor and choreographer.

Boisseau died in New York at the age of 100. She is reported to be the last of the Cotton Club girls. Boisseau is buried at Calverton Cemetery in Calverton, New York.

== Career ==
In the early 1930s Boisseau began performing at the Cotton Club, a night club in New York that featured numerous well-known African American jazz musicians and entertainers from 1923 to 1940, through the Prohibition era. She was often on the stage with Ethel Waters, the Nicholas Brothers, Eubie Blake, Noble Sisle, and Lena Horne. The Cotton Club was Boisseau’s base until she moved to France and became famous during Paris’ Jazz Age. In 1931 she performed in Broadway musical revue Fast and Furious.

She left for Paris briefly around 1935 along with other African American entertainers of the time as they were treated better and more appreciated among Europeans. Eventually Boisseau returned to Harlem and lived in an apartment a few streets away from the Cotton Club. She returned to a chorus job at Harlem Apollo Theatre where she worked together with singer George Dewey Washington. She was one of sixteen female dancers who made up the Apollo chorus line and were considered to be the best female dancers in New York. Among other notable dancers who worked in the chorus line during the 1930s were Ristina Banks, Carol Carter, Marion Evelyn Edwards, Elaine Ellis, Myrtle Hawkings, Temy Fletcher, Cleo Hayes and others.

In 1939 Boisseau performed as dancing chorus in Lew Leslie’s Blackbirds of 1939 in Broadway Hudson Theatre. The same year she was rated as one of the most proficient chorus girls in the country. In 1943 Boisseau starred in the movie Stormy Weather. The same year she did choreography at the Hollywood Club in Hollywood, California.

In early 1980s Boisseau was hired as a consultant for the film The Cotton Club. She, like the majority of the Cotton Clubs Girls, criticized the film as it didn’t accurately capture the history of the club and the famous chorus line, focusing more on violence and gangsters.

In 1984 Boisseau starred in a cabaret musical entertainment Shades of Harlem. It re-creates Harlem’s Cotton Club in the decade of the 20’s. Boisseau appeared in Shades of Harlem as one of there Renaissance Ladies along with two others former Cotton Club Dancers.

In 2002 Boisseau was the subject of the documentary Cotton Club Girl. The film draws the portrait of her personality showing her current life and memories from the 1930s when she danced in the Cotton Club working with Duke Ellington and Louis Armstrong.

Boisseau died May 22, 2012.
