= Apse Manor =

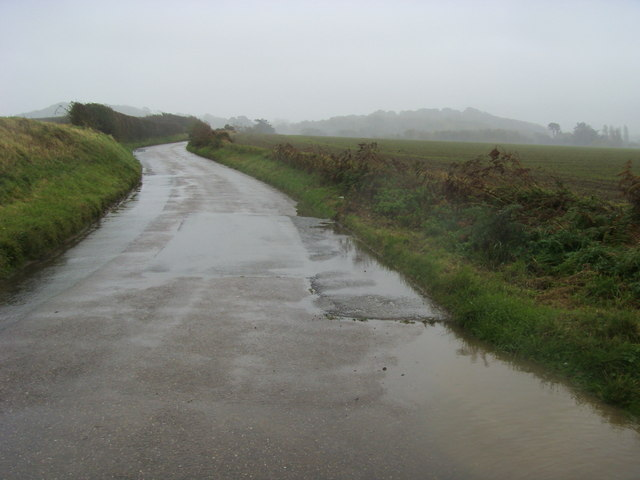
- Apse Manor road heading to Upper Hyde

General information
- Type: Manor house
- Location: Isle of Wight, United Kingdom

Apse Manor is a manor house on the Isle of Wight, situated just within the eastern boundary of the Newchurch parish. The house is pleasantly situated just to the north of the high road from Shanklin and as of 1912 retained a room with a stone fireplace and a heavy panelled Tudor ceiling.

== History ==
It was granted by Roger del Estre (? de Estur) at the solicitation of Richard de Redvers (1100–7) to the canons of Christchurch Twyneham, with whom it remained till the Dissolution of the monasteries. It then passed to the Crown and was leased from time to time. Thomas Rice appears to have been the lessee about the middle of the 16th century, holding under a ninety years' lease from the monks dated 1535. The manor after the expiration of Rice's lease was granted in 1595–6 for forty years to Elizeus Wynne. It seems afterwards to have passed to the Basketts, John Baskett being in possession in 1583, and Thomas Baskett apparently succeeding him. The Basketts were probably lessees under the Crown, for in 1624 at the request of John Ramsey, Earl of Holderness the manor was granted to Edward Ramsey of Hethersett, Norfolk, and Robert Ramsey of London, at a fee-farm rent of £25 5s. 4d. The Ramseys sold the manor in the same year to Richard Baskett, and he died in 1626, leaving a son and heir Richard, who sold it in 1640 to John Warner, Bishop of Rochester. He devised it to his nephew Dr. John Lee, D.D., whose son and heir Lee Warner, of the Inner Temple, sold it in 1678 to Edward Courthop. Apse must have passed from Courthop to a member of the Dillington family, for Worsley states that it was purchased of a Dillington by Edward Leigh of Newport, who left it to John Chichester. John Chichester was dealing with it in 1716, and Sir John Chichester was still in possession in 1747. The manor was sold by him or his son Sir John towards the end of the 18th century to Sir Richard Worsley. It passed from him with Appuldurcombe to Lord Yarborough, who sold it in 1854 to George Young. From him it was probably purchased by Mr. Gassiott, who in 1896 sold it to Lord Alverstone, who still owned it in 1912.
