= Avsey =

Russian masculine given name

Avsey (Russian: Авсе́й) is a Russian male first name. There are several theories as to its origins. According to one, it is simply a colloquial variant of the name Yevsey. Another possibility is that "Avsey", as well as Asey (Асе́й) and Osey (Осе́й), are colloquial variants of the name Absey (Абсе́й), alternatively spelled Apsey (Апсей), which until the end of the 19th century was included into the official Synodal Menologium. Finally, it is possible that "Avsey" derives from the Old East Slavic word авсень or овсень (avsen or ovsen), meaning New Year's Eve, which in ancient times corresponded to the first day of spring.

The diminutive of "Avsey" is Avseyka (Авсе́йка).

The patronymics derived from "Avsey" are "Авсе́евич" (Avseyevich; masculine) and its colloquial form "Авсе́ич" (Avseich), and "Авсе́евна" (Avseyevna; feminine). The patronymics derived from "Absey" are "Абсе́евич" (Abseyevich; masculine) and "Абсе́евна" (Abseyevna; feminine).

== Sources ==
- Petrovskii, Nikandr Aleksandrovich (2000-03-14). Slovar russkikh lichnykh imen Bolee 3000 imen [Dictionary of Russian First Names] (in Russian). Astrel. p. 34. ISBN 5-17-002940-3.
- Superanskaya, A. V. (2005). Словарь русских имён [Dictionary of Russian Names] (in Russian). Moscow: Издательство Эксмо. p. 31. ISBN 5-699-14090-5.
