= Armenian Professional Society =

The Armenian Professional Society is an organization that aims to better "fellowship among Armenian professionals", created in 1958. Membership requirements include a four-year degree from an accredited university and being sponsored by two paying members of APS.
