= Cookin' with the Miles Davis Quintet =

Studio album by Miles Davis
- Released: July 1957
- Recorded: October 26, 1956
- Studios: Van Gelder, Hackensack, New Jersey
- Genre: Jazz
- Length: 34:02
- Label: Prestige
- Producer: Bob Weinstock

Miles Davis chronology
Walkin' (1957)	Cookin' with the Miles Davis Quintet (1957)	Miles Ahead (1957)

Cookin' with the Miles Davis Quintet is a studio album by the Miles Davis Quintet which was released in July 1957 through Prestige Records. The recording sessions were at Rudy Van Gelder's studio in Hackensack, New Jersey, in 1956. As the musicians had to pay for the studio time (a result of a rather modest contract with Prestige), their recordings are practically live. Two sessions on May 11 and October 26, 1956, resulted in four albums — this one, Relaxin' with the Miles Davis Quintet, Steamin' with the Miles Davis Quintet and Workin' with the Miles Davis Quintet.

It was the first of the four LPs to be released. In response to the album title, Davis said, "After all, that's what we did—came in and cooked." Reid Miles designed the album's cover and Phil Hays provided the illustration.

== Reception ==
Professional ratings
Review scores
Source	Rating
All About Jazz	4/5 stars
AllMusic	4.5/5 stars
Disc	5/5 stars
The Encyclopedia of Popular Music	4/5 stars
Music Box	5/5 stars
The Penguin Guide to Jazz Recordings	4/4 stars
The Rolling Stone Jazz Record Guide	5/5 stars

In a review for AllMusic, Lindsay Planer wrote: "As these recordings demonstrate, there is an undeniable telepathic cohesion that allows this band ... to work so efficiently both on the stage and the studio... The immediate yet somewhat understated ability of each musician to react with ingenuity and precision is expressed in the consistency and singularity of each solo as it is maintained from one musician to the next without the slightest deviation."

Chris May of All About Jazz commented: "Cookin' may not have had the big budget and glossy marketing CBS brought to Davis' subsequent releases, but ... it contains some of the most alive and moving music he ever recorded ... His lyricism remains dark and brooding, but it's so rich it sings."

Writing for The Music Box, John Metzger called the album "essential", stating that it "precisely showcased the ensemble's full range and potential", and praising the "absolutely extraordinary" communication amongst the musicians.

== Track listing ==
Prestige – LP 7094:

Side one
No.	Title	Writer(s)	Length
1.	"My Funny Valentine"	Richard Rodgers	6:04
2.	"Blues by Five"	Miles Davis	10:23

Side two
No.	Title	Writer(s)	Length
1.	"Airegin"	Sonny Rollins	4:26
2.	"Tune Up / When Lights Are Low"	Miles Davis / Benny Carter, Spencer Williams	13:09
Total length:			34:02

== Personnel ==
- Miles Davis – trumpet, bandleader
- Paul Chambers – double bass
- John Coltrane – tenor saxophone (except 1)
- Red Garland – piano
- Philly Joe Jones – drums
