= Steamin' with the Miles Davis Quintet =

Studio album by Miles Davis
- Released: July or August 1961
- Recorded: May 11 and October 26, 1956
- Studio: Van Gelder, Hackensack
- Genre: Jazz
- Length: 40:00
- Label: Prestige
- Producer: Bob Weinstock

Miles Davis chronology
Sketches of Spain (1960)	Steamin' with the Miles Davis Quintet (1961)	Someday My Prince Will Come (1961)

Professional ratings
Review scores
Source	Rating
AllMusic	5/5 stars
DownBeat	4.5/5 stars
The Encyclopedia of Popular Music	4/5 stars
The Penguin Guide to Jazz Recordings	4/4 stars
The Rolling Stone Jazz Record Guide	4/5 stars

Steamin' with the Miles Davis Quintet is an album by the Miles Davis Quintet, released in 1961 through Prestige Records. The recording was made at two sessions on May 11 and October 26, 1956, that produced four albums: Steamin, Relaxin' with The Miles Davis Quintet, Workin' with The Miles Davis Quintet and Cookin' with the Miles Davis Quintet.

== Reception ==
The contemporaneous DownBeat reviewer praised all of the musicians except pianist Red Garland, and concluded: "This album is a must for anyone seriously interested in jazz".

== Track listing ==
Prestige – LP 7200

Side one
No.	Title	Writer(s)	Recording session	Length
1.	"Surrey with the Fringe on Top"	Richard Rodgers, Oscar Hammerstein II	May 11, 1956	9:05
2.	"Salt Peanuts"	Dizzy Gillespie, Kenny Clarke	May 11, 1956	6:09
3.	"Something I Dreamed Last Night"	Sammy Fain, Jack Yellen, Herb Magidson	May 11, 1956	6:15

Side two
No.	Title	Writer(s)	Recording session	Length
1.	"Diane"	Lew Pollack, Ernö Rapée	May 11, 1956	7:49
2.	"Well, You Needn't"	Thelonious Monk	October 26, 1956	6:19
3.	"When I Fall in Love"	Victor Young, Edward Heyman	May 11, 1956	4:23
Total length:				40:00

== Personnel ==
- Miles Davis – trumpet
- John Coltrane – tenor saxophone (except 3 and 6)
- Red Garland – piano
- Paul Chambers – bass
- Philly Joe Jones – drums
