= Relaxin' with the Miles Davis Quintet =

Studio album by Miles Davis
- Released: March 1958
- Recorded: May 11 and October 26, 1956
- Studio: Van Gelder (Hackensack)
- Genres: Jazz, hard bop
- Length: 36:13
- Labels: Prestige; PRLP 7129
- Producer: Bob Weinstock

Miles Davis chronology
Bags' Groove (1957)	Relaxin' with the Miles Davis Quintet (1958)	Ascenseur pour l'échafaud (1958)

Professional ratings
Review scores
Source	Rating
AllMusic	5/5 stars
The Encyclopedia of Popular Music	4/5 stars
The Penguin Guide to Jazz Recordings	4/4 stars
The Rolling Stone Album Guide	5/5 stars

Relaxin' with the Miles Davis Quintet is an album by the Miles Davis Quintet, released in March 1958 through Prestige Records. It was recorded at two sessions on May 11 and October 26, 1956, that produced four albums — this one, Steamin' with the Miles Davis Quintet, Workin' with the Miles Davis Quintet and Cookin' with the Miles Davis Quintet. These four albums are considered to be among the best performances in the whole hard bop subgenre. The album was remastered by Rudy Van Gelder in 2005 for Prestige Records. This album includes dialogue snippets taken from the original master reel. As the title suggests, it also emphasizes Miles Davis' concentrated medium-register ballad playing.

== Track listing ==
Prestige – LP 7129:

Side one
No.	Title	Writer(s)	Recording session	Length
1.	"If I Were a Bell"	Frank Loesser	October 26, 1956	8:15
2.	"You're My Everything"	Harry Warren	October 26, 1956	5:18
3.	"I Could Write a Book"	Richard Rodgers	October 26, 1956	5:09

Side two
No.	Title	Writer(s)	Recording session	Length
1.	"Oleo"	Sonny Rollins	October 26, 1956	6:18
2.	"It Could Happen to You"	Jimmy Van Heusen	May 11, 1956	6:37
3.	"Woody 'n' You"	Dizzy Gillespie	May 11, 1956	5:02
Total length:				36:13

== Personnel ==
- Miles Davis – trumpet
- John Coltrane – tenor saxophone
- Red Garland – piano
- Paul Chambers – bass
- Philly Joe Jones – drums

== Charts ==
Chart performance for Relaxin' with the Miles Davis Quintet
Chart (2022–2026)	Peak position
UK Jazz & Blues Albums (Official Charts)	27
US Top Album Sales (Billboard)	41
US Top Jazz Albums (Billboard)	3
US Top Traditional Jazz Albums (Billboard)	2
