= Workin' with the Miles Davis Quintet =

Studio album by Miles Davis
- Released: January 1960
- Recorded: May 11 and October 26, 1956
- Studio: Van Gelder, Hackensack
- Genre: Jazz
- Length: 41:59
- Label: Prestige
- Producer: Bob Weinstock

Miles Davis chronology
| Jazz Track (1959) | Workin' with the Miles Davis Quintet (1960) | Sketches of Spain (1960) |

Professional ratings
Review scores
| Source | Rating |
|---|---|
| All About Jazz | favorable |
| AllMusic | 5/5 stars |
| DownBeat | 5/5 stars |
| The Encyclopedia of Popular Music | 5/5 stars |
| The Penguin Guide to Jazz Recordings | 3.5/4 stars |
| The Rolling Stone Album Guide | 5/5 stars |
| The Rolling Stone Jazz Record Guide | 4/5 stars |

Workin' with the Miles Davis Quintet is an album by the Miles Davis Quintet, released in January 1960 by Prestige Records. It was recorded in two sessions on May 11 and October 26, 1956, that produced four albums: this one, Relaxin' with the Miles Davis Quintet, Steamin' with the Miles Davis Quintet and Cookin' with the Miles Davis Quintet.

Track 2 is a composition written for Davis by Eddie Vinson (see Blue Haze for more details). "Trane's Blues" (also known as "Vierd Blues", a tongue-in-cheek reference to Blue Note founder Francis Wolff's heavily accented verdict on it), also credited to Davis, is in fact a John Coltrane composition (originally titled "John Paul Jones", and from an earlier session led by bassist Paul Chambers; before the closing statement of theme, Coltrane and Davis play a bit of Charlie Parker's "The Hymn").

== Background ==
As his star rose in 1955, Davis formed a new quintet, featuring saxophonist John Coltrane, pianist Red Garland, bassist Paul Chambers, and drummer Philly Joe Jones. In order to fulfill contractual obligations, he recorded lengthy, spontaneous songs with the quintet, which were released over four albums— Cookin', Relaxin', Workin', and Steamin' with the Miles Davis Quintet.

== Track listing ==
Prestige – LP 7166:

Side one
| No. | Title | Writer(s) | Length |
|---|---|---|---|
| 1. | "It Never Entered My Mind" | Richard Rodgers | 5:26 |
| 2. | "Four" | Miles Davis | 7:15 |
| 3. | "In Your Own Sweet Way" | Dave Brubeck | 5:45 |
| 4. | "The Theme" (Take 1) | Miles Davis | 2:01 |

Side two
| No. | Title | Writer(s) | Length |
|---|---|---|---|
| 1. | "Trane's Blues" (a.k.a. "Vierd Blues") | John Coltrane | 8:35 |
| 2. | "Ahmad's Blues" | Ahmad Jamal | 7:26 |
| 3. | "Half Nelson" | Miles Davis | 4:48 |
| 4. | "The Theme" (Take 2) | Miles Davis | 1:03 |
| Total length: | | | 41:59 |

All tracks recorded on May 11, 1956, except "Half Nelson", recorded on October 26.

== Personnel ==
- Miles Davis – trumpet (except on "Ahmad's Blues")
- John Coltrane – tenor saxophone (except on "Ahmad's Blues")
- Red Garland – piano
- Paul Chambers – bass, cello
- Philly Joe Jones – drums
