= Village Gate =

Former jazz club in New York City

Coordinates: 40.728492°N 73.999719°W

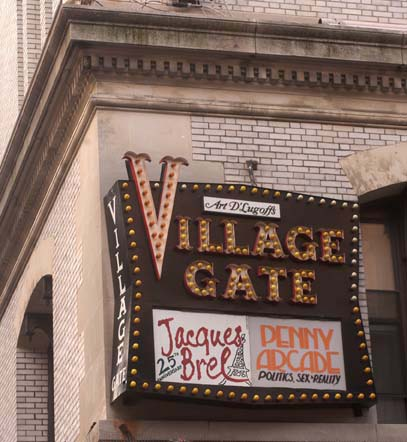
The Village Gate Sign still adorns the corner of Thompson and Bleecker Streets.

The Village Gate was a nightclub at the corner of Thompson and Bleecker Streets in Greenwich Village, New York. Art D'Lugoff opened the club in 1958, on the ground floor and basement of 160 Bleecker Street. The large 1896 Chicago School structure by architect Ernest Flagg was known at the time as Mills House No. 1 and served as a flophouse for transient men. In its heyday, the Village Gate also included an upper-story performance space, known as the Top of the Gate.

Throughout its 38 years, the Village Gate featured such musicians as John Coltrane, Coleman Hawkins, Duke Ellington, Mongo Santamaria, Jimi Hendrix, Golden Earring, Dizzy Gillespie, Bill Evans, Dave Brubeck, Larry Coryell, Charles Mingus, Sonny Rollins, Dexter Gordon, Art Blakey, Woody Shaw, Miles Davis, Stan Getz, Vasant Rai, Nina Simone, Herbie Mann, Woody Allen, Patti Smith, Lucio Dalla, Velvet Underground, Edgard Varèse, and Aretha Franklin, who made her first New York appearance there. The show Jacques Brel is Alive and Well and Living in Paris, debuted at the Village Gate in 1968.

== History ==
In the 1960s, radio DJ and Latin music advocate Symphony Sid hosted a regular Monday night concert at the Village Gate - "Monday Nights at the Gate" - featuring the best of New York's thriving Latin music scene. As salsa music began to grow in popularity, the Alegre record label began to host quite a few events at the Village Gate - many of which resulted in live recordings. Some of the live recordings from the Village Gate were the Alegre All-Star (and later Tico All-Star) Descarga sessions. The "Salsa Meets Jazz" series at the Village Gate was a seminal part of the history of New York Latin music. In 1977, WRVR jazz and Latin music DJ and jazz musician/conga drummer Roger Dawson created and hosted a weekly event that brought top Latin bands together with a guest jazz soloist. Dawson named the event "Salsa Meets Jazz". Sonny Stitt with Eddie Palmieri, Dexter Gordon with Machito, Dizzy Gillespie with Tito Puente, James Moody, Wynton Marsalis, Bobby Hutcherson, David "Fathead" Newman, Slide Hampton, and Pharoah Sanders, to name a few, all jumped in to "jam" with the best salsa bands of the time.

The club hosted a benefit for Timothy Leary in May 1970 that featured performances from such counterculture luminaries as Jimi Hendrix and Allen Ginsberg. From 1971 to 1973, a musical comedy revue called National Lampoon's Lemmings had a successful run at the Gate. It starred future comic notables John Belushi, Chevy Chase, Garry Goodrow, and Christopher Guest, and lampooned the 1969 Woodstock Festival, which had taken place upstate two years earlier, calling it "Woodchuck" and equating the entire hippie generation with lemmings bent on self-destruction.

Let My People Come opened at the Village Gate Theater in 1974. The show broke all box office records there and played for 1,167 performances. Its transfer to the Morosco Theatre on Broadway was not as successful, though, and closed after 106 performances. It was nominated for a Grammy in 1974 and has appeared all over the world.

From 1989 to 1991, the improvisational comedy troupe Noo Yawk Tawk performed at the upstairs theater. The group was conceived and directed by Richmond Shepard, a world-renowned mime, actor, comedian, and teacher. All of the performances for Noo Yawk Tawk were entirely improvised. Characters may have been repeated, but never the sketches or the dialogue. The audience always set the scene and conditions for each improvisation, so every performance was different. The cast included Stan Taffel, Marc Kudisch, Debra Wilson, Eric Douglas, Garry Goodrow, Miguel Sierra, Ken Dashow, Nola Roeper, Bonnie Comley, and Richmond Shepard. Taffel would go on to win three Emmy Awards for his performances in The News In Revue on PBS. Kudisch earned a Tony nomination in 2002.

The Village Gate name was again used in 1996 at 240 West 52nd Street. Art D'Lugoff, co-producer of the show A Brief History of White Music was looking to rent the space in a site formerly occupied by the Lone Star Road House. That incarnation and the show lasted until 1997. In 1998, the 52nd Street location was taken by a brief reincarnation of Max's Kansas City.

The Village Gate closed its Greenwich Village location in February 1994. The ground floor is currently occupied by CVS/Pharmacy. The off-Broadway capacity Village Theater, which hosted performances of the musically themed Love, Janis, Dream a Little Dream, Jacques Brel is Alive and Well and Living in Paris, and Escape From Bellevue, occupied the sublevel performance space until fall 2007. In spring 2008, the space was reopened as a multiuse performance venue and gallery bar called (Le) Poisson Rouge.

The club is mentioned by salsa superstars Richie Ray & Bobby Cruz in their song Pancho Cristal, off their 1968 LP Los Durísimos.
Vámonos pa'l Village Gate
Que allí es donde usted va y ve
Bravos de la tumbadora
Y las estrellas de ahora.

The club is mentioned again in the montuno:
Pancho Cristal
Descarga del Village Gate.

as well as in Chronicles: Volume One by Bob Dylan.

== Notable productions ==
The Top Of The Gate a.k.a. Village Gate (Upstairs):

- Love Lemmings (1991)
- Yesterdays: An Evening with Billie Holiday (1990)
- Noo Yawk Tawk (1998)
- Beehive (1986)
- Nacha at the Top of the Gate (1983) Nacha Guevara
- A... My Name Is Alice (1983)
- Rap Master Ronnie (1983)
- Lovesong (1976)
- Tommy Tune Atop The Gate (1975)
- The Charles Pierce Show (1974)

The Village Gate Theater a.k.a. Village Gate (Downstairs):

- Jacques Brel is Alive and Well and Living in Paris (1992)
- The Real Live Brady Bunch and the Real Live Game Show (1991)
- Further Mo' (1990)
- Sid Caesar & Company: The Legendary Genius of Comedy (1989)
- Sing Hallelujah! (1987)
- National Lampoon's Class of '86 (1986)
- El Grande de Coca-Cola (1986)
- Lies & Legends: The Musical Stories of Harry Chapin (1985)
- Shades of Harlem (1984)
- Orwell That Ends Well (1984)
- One Mo' Time (1979)
- Sterling Silver (1979)
- Nightsong (1977)
- 2 by 5 (1976)
- Let My People Come (1974)
- National Lampoon's Lemmings (1973)
- A Quarter for the Ladies' Room (1972)
- Kumquats (1971)
- Salvation (1969)
- Jacques Brel is Alive and Well and Living in Paris (1968)
- MacBird (1967)

The Village Gate 52nd Street

- A Brief History of White Music (1996)

== Recordings ==
Notable albums recorded live at The Village Gate:

- John Coltrane with Eric Dolphy Evenings At The Village Gate (Impulse!, rec. 1961, rel. July 2023)
- Toshiko Akiyoshi Toshiko at Top of the Gate (1968)
- Ahmad Jamal At The Top - Poinciana Revisited (Impulse!, 1969)
- Albert Ayler Live in Greenwich Village (1965)
- Charlie Byrd Byrd at the Gate (Riverside, 1963)
- Shlomo Carlebach At The Village Gate (1963)
- Alice Coltrane Journey in Satchidananda (track 5) (Impulse!, 1970)
- Chris Connor At The Village Gate (1963)
- Larry Coryell Larry Coryell at the Village Gate (1971)
- Lucio Dalla DallAmeriCaruso (1986)
- Bill Evans Trio "Top of the Gate" (1968)
- Stan Getz Getz at the Gate (Live at the Village Gate, Nov. 26, 1961) (Verve, 2019)
- Dick Gregory Live at The Village Gate (1970)
- John Handy New View (Columbia, 1967)
- Coleman Hawkins Hawkins! Eldridge! Hodges! Alive! At the Village Gate! (Verve, 1962); Hawkins! Alive! At the Village Gate (Verve, 1962)
- Milt Jackson Milt Jackson Quintet Live at the Village Gate (Riverside, 1963)
- Lambert, Hendricks & Bavan Havin' A Ball At The Village Gate (1963)
- Johnny Lytle Swingin' at the Gate (Pacific Jazz, 1967),
- Junior Mance Live at the Top (Atlantic, 1968)
- Chuck Mangione Live at The Village Gate (1989)
- Herbie Mann Herbie Mann at the Village Gate (Atlantic, 1961); Herbie Mann Returns to the Village Gate (Atlantic, 1961 [1963]); Monday Night at the Village Gate (Atlantic, 1965 [1966]); Standing Ovation at Newport (Atlantic, 1965)
- Hugh Masekela The Americanization of Ooga Booga (Recorded Live at The Village Gate) (MGM, 1965)
- Les McCann Les McCann Ltd. in New York (Pacific Jazz, 1961 [1962]); Les McCann Ltd. Plays the Shampoo (Pacific Jazz, 1961 [1963]); New from the Big City (Pacific Jazz, [1970]); From The Top of The Barrel (Pacific Jazz, 1967)
- Carmen McRae Alive! (1965)
- Thelonious Monk Live! At the Village Gate (Xanadu, 1963 [1985])
- Dave Pike the Doors of Perception (Vortex, 1966 [1970])
- Tito Puente Live at The Village Gate (1992)
- Sonny Rollins Our Man in Jazz (RCA Victor, 1962)
- Mongo Santamaría At the Village Gate (Riverside, 1963)
- Horace Silver Quintet Doin' the Thing (Blue Note, 1961)
- Nina Simone Nina at the Village Gate (1962)
- Sivuca Live at The Village Gate (1975)
- Jimmy Smith At the Village Gate (Metro 1965)
- Swingle Singers Live in New York '82 (1982)
- Clark Terry Live at The Village Gate (1990)
- Tico All-Stars Decargas: Live at The Village Gate (1966) - feat. Tito Puente, Victor Paz, Charlie Palmieri, Johnny Pacheco, Ray Barretto, Jimmy Sabater, and Joe Cuba
- Flip Wilson Live at The Village Gate (1964)

The Village Gate was a stop on the 'Greenwich Village Walking Tour', in part because Bob Dylan wrote "A Hard Rain's A-Gonna Fall" in September 1962 in a basement apartment occupied by Chip Monck, the Village Gate lighting engineer and future compere and lighting designer of the Woodstock Festival.

The Village Gate is used as a setting in the 1961 film noir movie Blast of Silence.
