= Miles Davis Quintet =

Jazz band led by Miles Davis

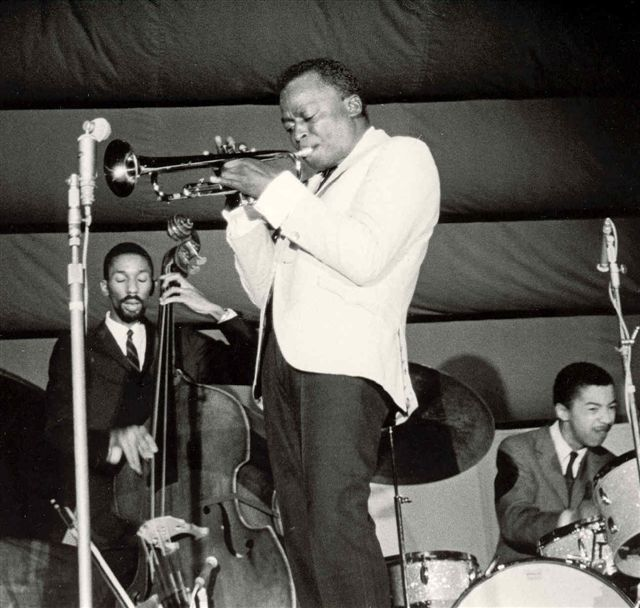
An early iteration of the "Second Great Quintet" performing in Antibes, c. July 1963. From left: Ron Carter, Davis, and Tony Williams. (Note: Also performing with the band at Antibes but not pictured in this image were Herbie Hancock and George Coleman.)

The Miles Davis Quintet was an American jazz band from 1955 to early 1969 led by Miles Davis. The quintet underwent frequent personnel changes toward its metamorphosis into a different ensemble in 1969. Most references pertain to two distinct and relatively stable bands: the First Great Quintet from 1955 to 1958, and the Second Great Quintet from late 1964 to early 1969, Davis being the only constant throughout.

== First Great Quintet/Sextet (1955–58) ==
In the summer of 1955, after Davis performed at the Newport Jazz Festival, he was approached by Columbia Records executive George Avakian, who offered him a contract if he could form a regular band. Davis assembled his first regular quintet to meet a commitment at the Café Bohemia in July with Sonny Rollins on tenor saxophone, Red Garland on piano, Paul Chambers on bass, and Philly Joe Jones on drums. By the autumn, Rollins had left to deal with his heroin addiction, and later in the year joined the hard bop quintet led by Clifford Brown and Max Roach.

At the recommendation of drummer Jones, Davis replaced Rollins with John Coltrane, beginning a partnership that would last five years and finalizing the Quintet's first line-up. Expanded to a sextet with the addition of Cannonball Adderley on alto saxophone in 1958, the First Great Quintet was one of the definitive hard bop groups along with the Brown--Roach Quintet and The Jazz Messengers, recording the Columbia albums 'Round About Midnight, Milestones, and the marathon sessions for Prestige Records resulting in four albums collected on The Legendary Prestige Quintet Sessions.

In mid-1958, Bill Evans replaced Garland on piano and Jimmy Cobb replaced Jones on drums, but Evans only remained for about six months, in turn replaced by Wynton Kelly as 1958 turned into 1959. This group backing Davis, Coltrane, and Adderley, with Evans returning for the recording sessions, recorded Kind of Blue, considered "one of the most important, influential and popular albums in jazz". Adderley left the band in September 1959 to pursue his own career, returning the line-up to a quintet. Coltrane departed in the spring of 1960, and after interim replacements Jimmy Heath and Sonny Stitt, Davis plus Kelly, Chambers, and Cobb continued through 1961 and 1962 with Hank Mobley on tenor saxophone.

The two rhythm sections from the Davis Quintet also gained attention in their own right. Garland, Chambers, and Jones recorded as a unit on Art Pepper Meets the Rhythm Section and Sonny Rollins's Tenor Madness, while Kelly, Chambers, and Cobb toured and recorded as a trio under Kelly's name, in addition to appearing on the albums Coltrane Jazz and the solo debut of Wayne Shorter, as well as backing Wes Montgomery on Full House and Smokin' at the Half Note. The Kelly–Chambers–Cobb trio also backed Art Pepper on the album Gettin' Together, which included trumpeter Conte Candoli.

== Second Great Quintet (1964–68) ==
Mobley, Kelly, Chambers, and Cobb all left Davis by the end of 1962, and during 1963 he struggled to maintain a steady line-up. By the late spring, he had hired the core of the Second Quintet with Herbie Hancock on piano, Ron Carter on bass, and Tony Williams on drums. Initially with George Coleman or Sam Rivers on tenor saxophone, the final member of the quintet arrived in late 1964 with the joining of saxophonist Wayne Shorter.

The performance style of the Second Great Quintet was often referred to by Davis as "time, no changes", incorporating elements of free jazz without completely surrendering to the approach. This allowed the five musicians to simultaneously contribute to the group as equals at times, rather than to always follow the established pattern of having the group leader and then the backing musicians perform unrelated solos. This band recorded the albums E.S.P., Miles Smiles, Sorcerer, Nefertiti, Miles in the Sky, and Filles de Kilimanjaro, and the live set considered by The Penguin Guide to Jazz to be their crowning achievement, The Complete Live at the Plugged Nickel 1965.

When Davis began to become more interested in the rock, soul, and funk music of the late 1960s, the Second Quintet unraveled. Carter departed during the sessions for Filles de Kilimanjaro, and in early 1969 Williams started his own band, The Tony Williams Lifetime, staying on with Davis to record the groundbreaking In a Silent Way. Davis would continue his innovations into jazz fusion with the album Bitches Brew and his work in the 1970s. As a result, the Second Quintet came to an end, though Hancock would contribute to subsequent sessions with Miles and appear on Jack Johnson, On the Corner, and Get Up with It. Players on In a Silent Way and Bitches Brew would go on to form the core jazz fusion bands of the 1970s away from Davis: Shorter and Joe Zawinul to Weather Report; John McLaughlin and Billy Cobham to the Mahavishnu Orchestra; Hancock and Bennie Maupin to Headhunters; and Chick Corea, Airto Moreira and Lenny White to Return to Forever.

Columbia / Legacy Recordings released Freedom Jazz Dance: The Bootleg Series, Vol. 5, a collection of previously unreleased tracks recorded by the Second Great Quintet between 1966 and 1968.

== Lost Quintet (1968–1970) ==
Following the dissolution of the Second Great Quintet, Davis enlisted a quintet consisting of Chick Corea on piano, Wayne Shorter on tenor saxophone, Dave Holland on bass, and Jack DeJohnette on drums. It became known retrospectively as the "Lost Quintet" because the group never released a studio album. In 2013, Columbia Records released Live in Europe 1969: The Bootleg Series Vol. 2, uncovering live concerts featuring the group's tour in Europe. Prior to their appearances on the road, the band performed at the Village Gate, a club rented by Davis formerly on Bleecker Street in New York City.

The Lost Quintet represents his transition into jazz fusion music with electronic instruments, and the members of the quintet would go on to collaborate with Davis in future projects such as Bitches Brew, which was released in 1970.

== Personnel ==
=== First Great Quintet (1955–58) ===
- Miles Davis – trumpet
- John Coltrane – tenor saxophone
- Red Garland – piano
- Paul Chambers – bass
- Philly Joe Jones – drums

Increased to Sextet in 1958 with Cannonball Adderley – alto saxophone

=== Second Great Quintet (1964–68) ===
- Miles Davis – trumpet
- Wayne Shorter – tenor saxophone
- Herbie Hancock – piano
- Ron Carter – bass
- Tony Williams – drums

=== Lost Quintet (1968–1970) ===
- Miles Davis – trumpet
- Wayne Shorter – tenor saxophone
- Chick Corea – piano, keyboards
- Dave Holland – bass
- Jack DeJohnette – drums
