= Bags' Groove (composition) =

Instrumental by Miles Davis

from the album Bags' Groove
- Released: 1957
- Recorded: December 24, 1954
- Genre: Jazz
- Length: 11:12
- Label: Prestige
- Composer(s): Milt Jackson

Bags' Groove track listing
- 5 tracks: 1. "Bags' Groove"; 2. "Airegin"; 3. "Oleo"; 4. "But Not for Me"; 5. "Doxy"

"Bags' Groove" is a jazz composition by Milt Jackson. It was first recorded by the Milt Jackson Quintet on April 7, 1952 for Blue Note Records, later released on Wizard of the Vibes. Lou Donaldson, John Lewis, Percy Heath and Kenny Clarke were on that date. Next was the Mat Mathews quintet with Herbie Mann (July 6, 1953), Bud Powell (September 1953), Mat Mathews again (September 1, 1953), a bootleg version by the Modern Jazz Quartet (October 31, 1953), the Lighthouse All-Stars (February 25, 1954), bassist Buddy Banks' quartet (with Bob Dorough and Roy Haynes in October 1954) and then Jay Jay Johnson and Kai Winding (December 3, 1954). Other important recordings include those by Ray Bryant, Oscar Peterson, Al Haig, George Russell, and Mal Waldron.

Perhaps the most famous recording was the one by Miles Davis's quintet in 1954. The recording was released on the 1957 album Bags' Groove. This version is famous for the fact that Thelonious Monk did not play behind Miles during his solo (at the request of Miles) and, after that, he delivered one of his most renowned solos at the piano. Other recordings from the same session are included on the album Miles Davis and the Modern Jazz Giants, and include "The Man I Love", "Swing Spring", and "Bemsha Swing". There are several important recordings of "Bags' Groove" by The Modern Jazz Quartet, featuring only the Quartet (Modern Jazz Quartet, 1957; European Concert, 1960, Concert in Japan '66, 1966, The Last Concert, 1974), and with special guests (Sonny Rollins- The Modern Jazz Quartet at Music Inn Vol.2, 1958; Paul Desmond- The Only Recorded Performance of Paul Desmond with the Modern Jazz Quartet, 1971).

The song was named for vibraphonist Milt Jackson's nickname "Bags".

== Personnel ==
- Miles Davis – trumpet
- Milt Jackson – vibraphone
- Thelonious Monk – piano
- Percy Heath – bass
- Kenny Clarke – drums
