= The Complete Pacific Jazz Joe Pass Quartet Sessions =

Box set by Joe Pass
- Released: 2001
- Recorded: February 4, 1963 to February 6, 1964
- Genre: Jazz, bebop
- Label: Mosaic

The Complete Pacific Jazz Joe Pass Quartet Sessions is a compilation album by American jazz guitarist Joe Pass, released on Mosaic Records in 2001. It includes pieces Pass recorded on Pacific Jazz Records in 1963 and 1964.

== Track listing ==
=== Disc One ===
1. "Catch Me (Forward Pass)" (A) 3:11 (Joe Pass)
2. "Days of Wine and Roses" (A) 2:49 (H. Mancini-J. Mercer)
3. You Stepped Out Of A Dream" (A) 3:03 (G. Kahn-N.H. Brown)
4. "But Beautiful" (A) 2:37 (J. Burke-J. Van Heusen)
5. "Mood Indigo" (B) 5:06 (D. Ellington-B. Bigard)
6. "It's All Right With Me" (B) 2:57 (Cole Porter)
7. "Deep Purple" (B) 5:04 (P. DeRose-M. Parish)
8. "Tangerine" (C) 3:08 (V. Schertzinger-J. Mercer)
9. "There Will Never Be Another You" (C) 4:59 (H. Warren-M. Gordon)
10. "Bags' Groove" (C) 3:52 (Milt Jackson)
11. "There Is No Greater Love" (C) 3:53 (I. Jones-M. Symes)
12. "The Night Has A Thousand Eyes" (C) 3:30 (B. Bernier-J. Brainin)
13. "No Cover No Minimum" (D) 5:38 (Bill Evans)
14. "Just Friends" (D) 3:35 (J. Klenner-S. Lewis)
15. "Walking Up" (D) 3:15 (Bill Evans)
16. "Peri's Scope" (D) 2:43 (Bill Evans)
17. "Catch Me" (E) 3:07 (Joe Pass)
18. "Summertime" (E) 6:20 (G. Gershwin-D. Heyward)
19. "Falling In Love With Love" (E) 5:46 (R. Rodgers-L. Hart)

=== Disc Two ===
1. "On Time" (F) 4:16 (Les McCann)
2. "Yours Is My Heart Alone" (F) 4:45 (Lehar-Herzer-Smith-Loehner)
3. "This For Doug" (F) 5:54 (Ron Jefferson)
4. "Fondue" (F) 5:12 (Les McCann)
5. "Bernie's Tune" (F) 3:02 (Jerry Leiber, Bernie Miller, Mike Stoller)
6. "Maichen" (F) 4:34 (Leroy Vinnegar)
7. "It Could Happen To You" (F) 5:00 (J. Burke-J. Van Heusen)
8. "You're Driving Me Crazy" (F) 4:56 (Walter Donaldson)
9. "So What" (F) 3:01 (Miles Davis)
10. "The Other Way" (F) 4:47 (Les McCann)
11. "Free At Pass…Thank God Almighty…Free At Pass" (F) 4:59 (Les McCann)
12. "These Foolish Things" (G) 5:18 (Link-Strachey-Marvell)
13. "Joe's Tune (Samba)" (G) 2:23 (Joe Pass)
14. "Stragler" (G) 4:01 (Les McCann)
15. "Simon Potter" (G) 5:17 (Les McCann)
16. "Catch Up (Forward Pass)" (G) 2:52 (Joe Pass)

=== Disc Three ===
1. "Back At The Chicken Shack" (H) 4:15 (Jimmy Smith)
2. "Sack O' Woe" (H) 3:04 (Julian Adderley)
3. "Groove Yard" (H) 3:17 (Carl Perkins)
4. "Groove Yard" (alt tk) (H) 4:07 (Carl Perkins)
5. "Sonnymoon For Two" (H) 2:41 (Sonny Rollins)
6. "Shiny Stockings" (H) 3:55 (Frank Foster)
7. "Sermonette" (I) 2:30 (Nat Adderley)
8. "Bags' Groove (I) 3:06 (Milt Jackson)
9. "Sister Sadie (I) 4:13 (Horace Silver)
10. "Li'l Darlin'" (I) 3:39 (Neal Hefti)
11. "Work Song" (I) 4:11 (Nat Adderley)
12. "Blue 'n' Boogie" (I) 3:10 (D. Gillespie-F. Paparelli)
13. "Charade" (J) 2:25 (H. Mancini-J. Mercer)
14. "Call Me Irresponsible" (J) 2:27 (S. Cahn-J. Van Heusen)
15. "How the West Was Won" (J) 3:00 (K. Darby-A. Newman)
16. "Wives And Lovers" (J) 3:03 (B. Bacharach-H. David)
17. "Sunday In New York" (K) 2:52 (P. Nero-C. Coates)
18. "Love With The Proper Stranger" (K) 1:52 (E. Bernstein-J. Mercer)
19. "Love Theme of Tom Jones" (K) 2:55 (John Addison)
20. "Manhã de Carnaval" (K) 3:27 (L. Bonfa-A. Maria)
21. "Lawrence of Arabia" (L) 3:00 (Maurice Jarre)
22. "Fall Of Love" (L) 3:08 (D. Tiompkin-N. Washington)
23. "It Had Better Be Tonight" (L) 2:33 (Mancini-Mercer-Migliacci)
24. "More" (L) 2:59 (Olivieri-Ortolani-Newall-Olivieri)

=== Disc Four ===
1. "I Believe In You" (M) 3:12 (Frank Loesser)
2. "It's A Wonderful World" (M) 4:33 (Saveit-Adamson-Watson)
3. "Hello Dolly" (M) 3:12 (Jerry Herman)
4. "Summer Night" (M) 5:11 (H. Warren-A. Dubin)
5. "The Sweetest Sounds" (M) 2:51 (Richard Rodgers)
6. "Jambalaya" (N) 2:35 (Hank Williams)
7. "Cold Cold Heart" (N) 3:16 (Hank Williams)
8. "You Win Again" (N) 2:33 (Hank Williams)
9. "Hey Good Lookin'" (N) 2:26 (Hank Williams)
10. "Django" (O) 3:20 (John Lewis)
11. "Rosetta" (O) 3:06 (Earl Hines)
12. "Nuages" (O) 2:33 (Django Reinhardt)
13. "For Django" (O) 2:58 (Joe Pass)
14. "Night And Day" (O) 3:45 (Cole Porter)
15. "Fleur D'Ennui" (P) 2:56 (Django Reinhardt)
16. "Insensiblement" (P) 3:12 (Paul Misraki)
17. "Cavalerie" (P) 4:25 (Django Reinhardt)
18. "Django's Castle (Manoir De Mes Reves)" (P) 3:48 (Django Reinhardt)
19. "Limehouse Blues" (P) 2:13 (P. Braham-D. Furber)
20. "Georgia On My Mind" (O or P) 3:20 (H. Carmichael-S. Gorrell)
21. "Rosetta" (alt) (O) 3:13 (Earl Hines)
22. "Limehouse Blues" (alt) (P) 1:40 (P. Braham-D. Furber)

=== Disc Five ===
1. "Joy Spring" (Q) 8:44 (Clifford Brown)
2. "Some Time Ago" (Q) 6:41 (Sergio Mihanovich)
3. "The Night Has a Thousand Eyes" (Q) 7:14 (B. Bernier-J. Brainin)
4. "Relaxin' At Camarillo" (Q) 10:34 (Charlie Parker)
5. "There Is No Greater Love" (Q) 9:11 (I. Jones-M. Symes)
6. "Bags' Groove" (Q) 8:59 (Milt Jackson)
7. "Some Time Ago" (alt) (Q) 5:35 (Sergio Mihanovich)
8. "The Night Has A Thousand Eyes" (alt) (Q) 6:00 (B. Bernier-J. Brainin)
9. "There Is No Greater Love" (alt) (Q) 6:33 (I. Jones-M. Symes)

== Discography ==
For the purposes of this discography, only first U.S. issue of each track is given.

(A) Joe Pass (g, ac g-1), Clare Fischer (p, org-2), Ralph Pena (b), Larry Bunker (d).

(Pacific Jazz Studios) LA, January 30, 1963

Catch me (Forward Pass) PJ single

Days of Wine and Roses-1, 2-

You Stepped Out of a DreamPJ ST-73

But Beautiful-1-

(B) same as (A):

(Pacific Jazz Studios) LA, February 4, 1963

Mood Indigo PJ ST-73

It’s All Right With Me, previously unissued

Deep Purple-1 –

(C) probably same as (A):

(Pacific Jazz Studios) LA, probably February, 1963

Tangerine-1 previously unissued

There Will Never Be Another You-1-

Bags’ Groove –

There Is No Greater Love-

The Night Has A Thousand Eyes-

(D) Joe Pass (g), Clare Fischer (p, org-1), Albert Stinson (b), Colin Bailey (d).

(Pacific Jazz Studios) LA, July 18, 1963

No cover no minimumPJ ST-73

Just Friends-1-

Walking up-

Peri’s Scope previously unissued

(E) same as (D):

(Pacific Jazz Studios) LA, July 19, 1963

Catch Me-1 PJ ST-73

Summertime-

Falling In Love With Love -1-

(F) LES McCANN Joe Pass (g), Les McCann (p), Leroy Vinnegar (b), Ron Jefferson (d). (Pacific Jazz Studios) LA, July–August, 1962

On Time PJ ST-56

Yours Is My Heart Alone –

This For Doug –

Fondue –

Bernie’s Tune –

Maichen –

It Could Happen To You –

You’re Driving Me Crazy –

So What –

The Other Way previously unissued

Free At Pass…Thank God Almighty…Free At Pass

NOTE – The piano introduction on "This for Doug" was not used on the original album.

(G) Joe Pass (g), Les McCann (p), Herbie Lewis (b), Paul Humphrey (d).

(Pacific Jazz Studios) LA, March 28, 1963

These Foolish Things previously unissued

Joe’s Tune (Samba) –

Stragler –

Simon Potter –

Catch Up (Forward Pass) –

NOTE: A version of "Why Don’t You Do Right?" may have been recorded at this session, but no tape has survived.

(H) LES McCANN Joe Pass (g), Les McCann (p), Paul Chambers (b), Paul Humphrey (d). (Pacific Jazz Studios) LA, October 29, 1963

Back At The Chicken Shack PJ ST-78

Sack O’ Woe –

Groove Yard –

Groove Yard (alt tk) previously unissued

Sonnymoon For Two PJ ST-78

Shiny Stockings –

(I) same as (H) . LA, October 30, 1963

Sermonette PJ ST-78

Bags’ Groove –

Sister Sadie –

Li’l Darlin’ –

Work Song-

Blue ‘n Boogie previously unissued

(J) Joe Pass (12-string g), John Pisano (rhythm g), Charlie Haden (b), Larry Bunker (d)

(Pacific Jazz Studios) LA, March 12, 1964

Charade WP ST-1822

Call Me Irresponsible –

How The West Was Won –

Wives And Lovers –

(K) same as (J): LA, March 19, 1964

Sunday In New York WP ST-1822

Love With The Proper Stranger –

Love Theme Of Tom Jones –

Manha De Carnaval –

(L) same as (J): LA, March 20, 1964

Lawrence Of Arabia WP ST-1822

Fall Of Love –

It Had Better Be Tonight-

More –

(M) Bill Perkins (ts-1, bari-2, fl-3), Joe Pass (g), John Pisano (rhythm g), Frank Strazzeri (p), Jim Hughart (b).

(Pacific Jazz Studios) LA, June 1, 1964

tk.5 I Believe In You-1 previously unissued

tk.4 It’s A Wonderful World-2-

Hello Dolly-1 –

Summer Night-3-

tk.7 The Sweetest Sound-1 –

(N) Joe Pass (g), John Pisano (rhythm g), Jim Hughart (b), Colin Bailey (d).

(Pacific Jazz Studios) LA, August 13, 1964

Jambalaya previously unissued

Cold Cold Heart –

You Win Again-

Hey Good Lookin’-

(O) Joe Pass (g), John Pisano (rhythm g), Jim Hughart (b), Colin Bailey (d).

(Pacific Jazz Studios) LA, September 2, 1964

Django PJ ST-85

Rosetta (alt tk) previously unissued

Rosetta PJ ST-85

Nuages –

For Django –

Night And Day –

(P) same personnel and location:

(Pacific Jazz Studios) LA, probably September 18, 1964

Fleur d’Ennui PJ ST-85

Insensiblement –

Cavalerie –

Django’s Castle (Manoir De Mes Reves) –

Limehouse Blues (alt tk) previously unissued

Limehouse Blues PJ ST-85

from session O or P:

Georgia On My Mindpreviously unissued

(Q) Joe Pass (g), Mike Wofford (p), Jim Hughart (b), Colin Bailey (d).

(Encore Theatre) LA, February 6, 1964

Joy SpringBN LT-1103

Some Time Ago-

The Night Has A Thousand Eyes-

Relaxin’ At Camarillo-

There Is No Greater Love-

Bags’ Groove previously unissued

Some Time Ago (alt tk)-

The Night Has A Thousand Eyes (alt tk)-

There Is No Greater Love (alt tk) –

Album index

Pacific Jazz ST-56 Les McCann – On Time

Pacific Jazz ST-73 Joe Pass – Catch Me

Pacific Jazz ST-78 Les McCann – Soul Hits

World Pacific WP-1822 Joe Pass – 12-String Guitar Movie Themes

Pacific Jazz ST-85 Joe Pass – For Django

Blue Note LT-1103 Joe Pass – Joy Spring

Original sessions produced by Richard Bock

Produced for release by Michael Cuscuna

Recording engineers: Richard Bock and Dino Lappas

Tape transfers by Malcolm Addey and Jay Ranellucci

Sessions A, B, the first two tunes of C, the second and eighth tunes of F and session Q were transferred from the original stereo masters.

All other sessions remixed from the original three-track masters by Malcolm Addey

Mastered using 24-bit analog-to-digital resolution by Malcolm Addey.

Special Thanks to Les McCann, Clare Fischer, John Pisano, Russ Wapensky and the Institute of Jazz Studies.

Masters appear courtesy of Blue Note Records, a division of Capitol Records, Inc.

Producer’s note:

This set contains all of Joe Pass’s sessions as a leader during 1963 and ’64. Because his unissued March 28, 1963 session (G) finds Pass supported by Les McCann’s trio, we’ve expanded the scope to include the guitarist’s other two recorded encounters with that trio, both of which were done under Les’s leadership and heavily feature Pass. We’ve taken liberties with the chronology of the sessions in two places so that the "Catch Me!" sessions and the live session can each be contained on a single CD.

Joe Pass’s post-1964 albums for the label ("A Sign Of The Times", "The Stones Jazz" and "Simplicity") are commercial ventures in larger musical settings. Their jazz content is minimal and therefore, they are not included here.

As with many Pacific Jazz tapes, there are odd edits here and there which were executed on the original master tapes and occasional dropouts.
