= Miles Davis All Stars, Vols. 1 & 2 =

- Miles Davis All Stars, Vol. 1

Studio album by Miles Davis
- Released: 1955
- Recorded: December 24, 1954
- Studio: Van Gelder; Hackensack, New Jersey
- Genre: Jazz; bebop; hard bop
- Length: Vol. 1: 21:54; Vol. 2: 17:21
- Label: Prestige; PRLP 196; PRLP 200
- Producer: Bob Weinstock

Miles Davis chronology
Miles Davis with Sonny Rollins (1954)	Miles Davis All Stars, Vols. 1 & 2 (1955)	The Musings of Miles (1955)

Miles Davis All Stars, Volume 2

Professional ratings
Review scores
Source	Rating
The Encyclopedia of Popular Music	(Vol. 1)
The Encyclopedia of Popular Music	(Vol. 2)

Miles Davis All Stars, Vols. 1 & 2 are a pair of separate but related 10" LP albums by Miles Davis recorded by Rudy Van Gelder on December 24, 1954, and released on Prestige Records as Miles Davis All Stars, Vol. 1 and Miles Davis All Stars, Vol. 2 the following year.

The All Stars session featured two of Davis’s major be-bop contemporaries: pianist and composer Thelonious Monk and vibraphonist Milt Jackson, along with the same rhythm section that had been used on Davis's other recent albums—bassist Percy Heath and drummer Kenny Clarke; the later three comprised three-quarters of the Modern Jazz Quartet at this time.

After the 10" LP format was discontinued, the tracks would be broken up and reissued on the new 12" format: "Bags' Groove" on Bags' Groove (1957), paired with an alternate take; the other three on Miles Davis and the Modern Jazz Giants (1959), paired with an alternate take of "The Man I Love" and an unrelated track from a later session with his First Great Quintet.

This would be the last Miles Davis LP issued by Prestige in the short-lived 10" format. His next album, Musings of Miles (PRLP 7007), would be his first 12" LP, followed by Dig (PRLP 7012), which would be the first to repackage the older 10" material. Alternating albums of new and repackaged material would follow, until all the early Prestige material was now available in the new format.

== Track listing ==
=== Miles Davis All Stars, Vol. 1 ===
Side one
No.	Title	Writer(s)	Length
1.	"Bags' Groove" (Take 1)	Milt Jackson	11:16

Side two
No.	Title	Writer(s)	Length
1.	"Swing Spring"	Miles Davis	10:46
Total length:			21:54

=== Miles Davis All Stars, Vol. 2 ===
Side one
No.	Title	Writer(s)	Length
1.	"Bemsha Swing"	Denzil Best; Thelonious Monk	9:33

Side two
No.	Title	Writer(s)	Length
1.	"The Man I Love"	George Gershwin; Ira Gershwin	7:59
Total length:			17:21

== Personnel ==
- Miles Davis – trumpet
- Milt Jackson – vibraphone
- Thelonious Monk – piano
- Percy Heath – bass
- Kenny Clarke – drums
