= Doxy (song) =

Jazz musical piece by Sonny Rollins

"Doxy" is an early composition by jazz saxophonist Sonny Rollins. It was originally recorded by Rollins with Miles Davis in 1954, and it appeared on the 10-inch LP Miles Davis with Sonny Rollins. It was also included on the 1957 Davis album Bags' Groove. The original recording features Davis on trumpet, Rollins on tenor saxophone, Horace Silver on piano, Percy Heath on bass, and Kenny Clarke on drums. When Rollins eventually established his own record label, he named it Doxy Records. The chords are from Bob Carleton's 16-bar song "Ja-Da".

"Doxy" has become a jazz standard, a frequently performed and recorded part of many musicians' repertoires. Some sources say "Doxy" was written by Rollins during a stopover in England during a European tour and the name came from a bread spread the band was eating in the hotel. Other sources note that Rollins never toured England and Europe until 1959, five years after the song was written. "Doxy," according to Rollins, is a double entendre that refers to the sacred and the profane. Doxy comes from the Greek "doxa," meaning a kind of incomplete knowledge.
