= The Musings of Miles =

Studio album by Miles Davis
- Released: September 1955
- Recorded: June 7, 1955
- Studio: Van Gelder Studio; Hackensack, New Jersey
- Genre: Jazz
- Length: 35:46
- Label: Prestige; PRLP 7007
- Producer: Bob Weinstock

Miles Davis chronology
Miles Davis All Stars, Volume 2 (1955)	The Musings of Miles (1955)	Dig (1956)

The Musings of Miles, also reissued as The Beginning, is the first 12" LP record by Miles Davis. It was issued by Prestige Records in September 1955, following several LPs issued in the 10 inch format. The six tracks were all recorded at Rudy Van Gelder's home studio on June 7, 1955.

Pianist Red Garland and drummer Philly Joe Jones would go on to join Miles' First Great Quintet, that would record later in 1955. "A Night in Tunisia" features Jones playing with special drum sticks which had bells riveted to the shaft.

== Reception ==
The AllMusic review by Scott Yanow called it "likable if not essential music."

Professional ratings
Review scores
Source	Rating
AllMusic	3/5 stars
The Encyclopedia of Popular Music	3/5 stars
The Penguin Guide to Jazz Recordings	2.5/4 stars
The Rolling Stone Jazz Record Guide	4/5 stars

== Track listing ==
Side one
No.	Title	Writer(s)	Length
1.	"Will You Still Be Mine?"	Matt Dennis, Tom Adair	6:23
2.	"I See Your Face Before Me"	Arthur Schwartz, Howard Dietz	4:46
3.	"I Didn't"	Miles Davis	6:06

Side two
No.	Title	Writer(s)	Length
1.	"A Gal in Calico"	Arthur Schwartz, Leo Robin	5:18
2.	"A Night in Tunisia"	Dizzy Gillespie, Frank Paparelli	7:23
3.	"Green Haze"	Miles Davis	5:50
Total length:			35:46

== Personnel ==
- Miles Davis – trumpet
- Red Garland – piano
- Oscar Pettiford – bass
- Philly Joe Jones – drums

== Charts ==
Chart performance for The Musings of Miles
Chart (2025)	Peak position
Greek Albums (IFPI)	89
