= Takao Ogawa =

Japanese musician and writer

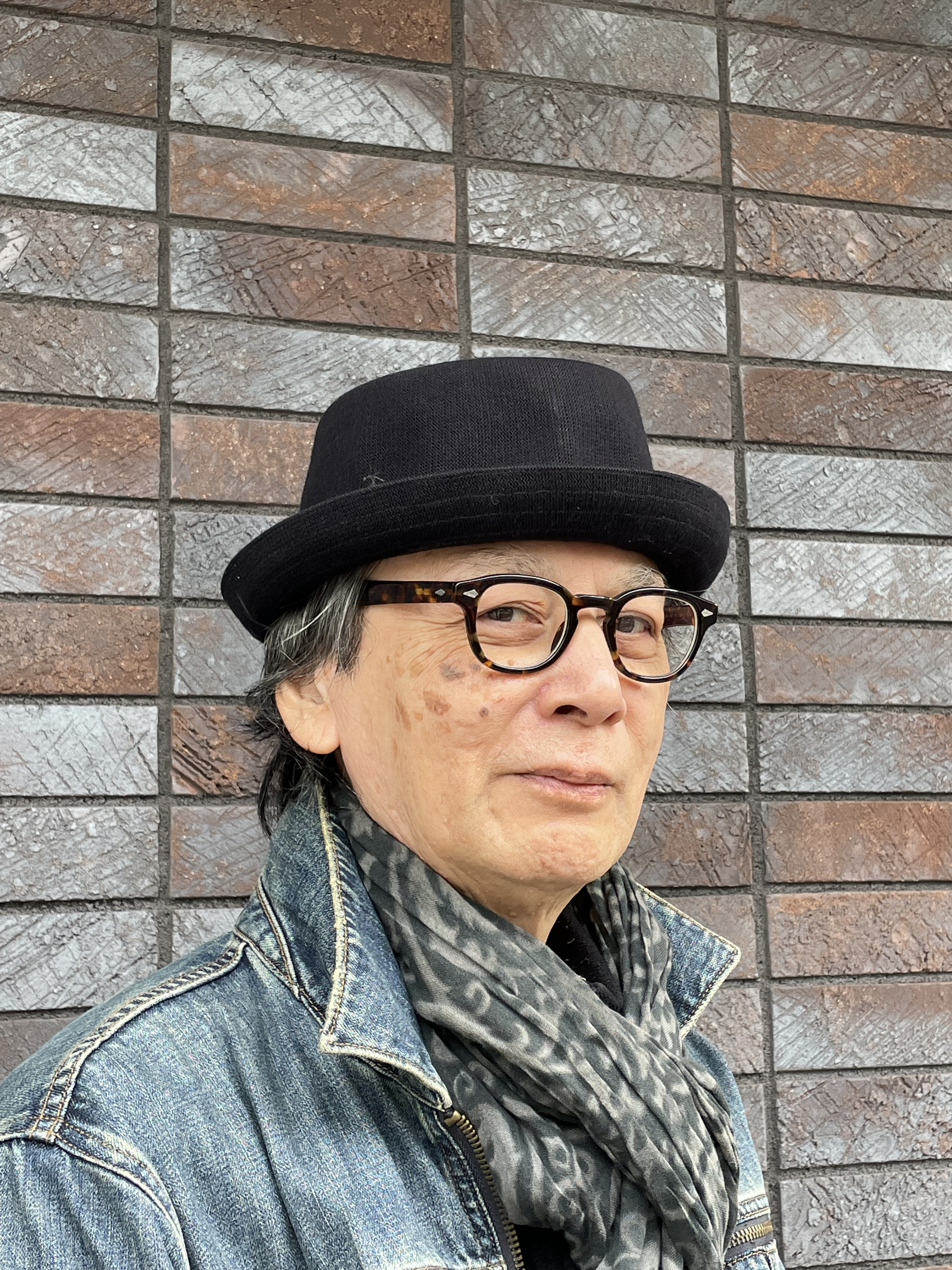
- Born: August 7, 1950 (age 76); Tokyo, Japan
- Education: Tokyo Medical University, New York University Graduate School of Arts and Science
- Occupations: Novelist, music journalist, producer, guitarist, orthopedic surgeon
- Known for: Jazz books, Record producer
- Notable work: The Truth about Miles Davis · マイルス· デイヴィスの真実 (in Japanese) A True History of Blue Note – Revised Edition ·ブルーノートの真実 (in Japanese) Jazz in Japan through Testimonials · 証言で綴る日本のJazz (in Japanese)
- Awards: Music Pen Club Japan Music award for Jazz in Japan through Testimonials, 2015

Takao Ogawa (小川隆夫, born August 7, 1950, in Tokyo, Japan) is a Japanese novelist, music journalist, music producer, composer, guitarist, and orthopedic surgeon. He is known for his work in various music fields, particularly jazz, and as a complete collector of Blue Note.

Ogawa learned classical guitar at a young age and formed a band in high school. He later pursued a career in medicine while playing jazz guitar in a band. Over the next forty years, Ogawa has written liner notes for more than 3,000 records and CDs of American/European/Japanese jazz musicians and produced CDs. He interviewed more than 1,000 musicians and related people among whom Miles Davis (1985–1990), Art Blakey (1982-1991), Sonny Rollins (1986–2001), Oscar Peterson (1987), Dexter Gordon (1982–1984), Herbie Hancock (1985–2019), Keith Jarrett (2001), Charlie Watts (1989,1990), Toshiko Akiyoshi (1984–2016), Sadao Watanabe (1985–2021), Terumasa Hino(1983–2021), Alfred Lion (1985, 1986), Bob Weinstock (1999), Orrin Keepnews (2000), and Creed Taylor. (2009) Ogawa befriended Miles Davis in 1985 and wrote seven books about him. He has written many articles and books mainly about jazz and formed Selim Slive Elementz, an electric free jazz rock band in 2016, in homage to Miles Davis.

In 1992, Ogawa produced albums by Kenny Werner, Dennis Chambers, Marc Copland, the keyboardist Adam Holzman who played with Miles Davis, Bob Mintzer, Curtis Fuller, and other artists at Flatout productions.

Ogawa is Director of Orthopedics at Central Clinic in Tokyo, Japan.

== Early life and education ==
Ogawa started learning classical guitar when he was 10 years old and he was impressed by João Gilberto's guitar style which he heard from the Getz / Gilberto album at the age of 13. That started his interest in Bossa nova. Around that time, he formed a band with his junior high school classmates in the same style as The Ventures. When in high school, Ogawa played folk songs in a band, played on radio stations and concert halls, and played with a Rhythm & blues band in discothèques in Tokyo.

Ogawa entered Tokyo Medical University in 1970. He started playing jazz guitar in a jazz band in parallel with his activities in rock bands and studied jazz guitar and music theory at "An Music School" in 1971. Ogawa formed a jazz band with students of the same school and played at jazz cafes and hotel lounges in Tokyo. After that, his schoolwork as a medical student became very demanding, so he gave up all band activities.

In 1977, Ogawa graduated from medical school and entered the medical office of the university hospital. From 1981 to 1983, he lived in New York as a graduate student and studied social rehabilitation at New York University Graduate School.

During this time, he got to know Wynton Marsalis and his brother Branford and Art Blakey who all lived in the building next to his place, as well as Max Gordon, the owner of Village Vanguard and many others.

== Career ==
After returning to Japan in 1983, Ogawa started working as a music critic, translator, journalist, and musical event producer, jazz in particular.

In 1985, he met Alfred Lion, the founder of Blue Note Records, and when Lion came to Japan the following year, he traveled together with Ogawa as his doctor. That year, Ogawa interviewed Miles Davis, and this led to a long-time friendship between them. By the time Miles left this world in 1991, Ogawa had had nearly 20 interviews and meetings with Miles and based on these experiences he published The Truth About Miles Davis and Miles Speaks – Everything that Miles Davis Told.

In the 1990s, he launched labels such as Glass House (Pioneer LDC), Savoy (Nippon Columbia), and Novus-J (BMG Victor) and he produced his works in New York and Chicago.

Since 2010, Ogawa has focused on interviews with Japanese musicians, especially about the situation of Japanese jazz after World War II and the development of jazz. He wrote Jazz in Japan through Testimonials, and introduced those Japanese musicians through books such as Legendary Live in Japan – Jazz History Revealed through Records and Memories and All Recordings of Jazzmen Visiting Japan from 1931 to 1979.

In 2016, he formed Selim Slive Elementz, a band in memory of Miles Davis, with Japanese leading club jazz musicians. They performed at the Tokyo Jazz Festival at WWWX, Shinjuku "Pit-in", "Motion Blue Yokohama", Shibuya "JZ Brat", "If it's sunny, throw beans in the sky (Haretara Sorani Mame Maite)".

In 2017, they released their debut album, Resurrection (T5Jazz Records) and Voice (Flatout/Ultra-Vybe) in 2019.

Ogawa regularly hosts radio broadcasts on NHK-FM and other radio stations such as Jazz Miles, a radio show on Miles Davis aired on NHK in Japan.

== Recognition ==
In 2015, Ogawa won the "Music Pen Club Music Award" for his work Jazz in Japan through Testimonials.

In 2024, Ogawa was nominated for the "Music Pen Club Music Award" for his work The Definitive Guide to The Blue Note 1500 Series.

== Selected works ==
- My Neighbor, Wynton (Marsalis) · となりのウイントン (NHK Publishing), 2006, Language: Japanese ISBN 4-14-081152-8
- Jazz in Japan through Testimonials · 証言で綴る日本のジャズ (Komakusa Publishing), 2015, Language: Japanese ISBN 978-4-905447-71-9
- The Truth about Miles Davis ·マイルス·デイヴィスの真実 (Kodansha + α Bunko), 2016, Language: Japanese ISBN 978-4-06-281691-5
- A True Story of Blue Note – Revised Edition · 改訂版ブルーノートの真実(Tokyo Kirarasha), 2019, Language: Japanese ISBN 978-4-903883-46-5
- Encyclopedia of Miles Davis ·マイルス·デイヴィス大事典 (Shinko Music Entertainment), 2023, Language: Japanese ISBN 978-4-401-65118-4
- All Recordings of Jazzmen Who Visited Japan 1931 -1979 · History of the Development of Japanese Jazz with Records · 来日ジャズメン全レコーディング1931−1979 · レコードでたどる日本ジャズ発展史 (Shinko Music Entertainment), 2023, Language: Japanese ISBN 978-4-401-65335-5
- The Golden Age of Jazz Clubs - NY Jazz Diary 1981-1983 · ジャズ · クラブ黄金時代 - NYジャズ日記 1981–1983 (Shinko Music Entertainment) 2023, Language: Japanese ISBN 978-4-401-65424-6
- The Definitive Guide to The Blue Note 1500 Series · 決定版ブルーノート1500シリーズ 完全解説 (Shinko Music Entertainment) 2024, Language: Japanese ISBN 978-4401654611

== Selected discography (as producer) ==
- Peter Erskine: Sweet Soul, CD, 1991, Novus-J/BMG Victor Inc.
- Bob Mintzer: I Remember Jaco, CD, 1991, Novus-J/BMG Victor Inc.
- Curtis Fuller: Blues - ette Part II, Album, 1993, Savoy/Columbia Music Entertainment.
- Adam Holzman: In a Loud way, Album, 1992, Manhattan Records.
- Marc Copland: Stompin' with Savoy, CD, 1995, Savoy/Columbia Music Entertainment.
- Denis Chambers: Getting Even, CD, Album, 1998, Glass House/Pioneer LDC, Inc.
- Selim Slive Elementz: Resurrection, CD, Album, 2017, T5 Jazz Records (Vivid Sound Corporation).
