= Bags' Groove =

Compilation album by Miles Davis
- Released: Early December 1957
- Recorded: June 29 & December 24, 1954
- Studio: Van Gelder; Hackensack, New Jersey
- Genre: Jazz
- Length: 46:11
- Label: Prestige; PRLP 7109
- Producer: Bob Weinstock

Miles Davis chronology
Miles Ahead (1957)	Bags' Groove (1957)	Relaxin' with the Miles Davis Quintet (1958)

Professional ratings
Review scores
Source	Rating
AllMusic	5/5 stars
The Encyclopedia of Popular Music	4/5 stars
The Penguin Guide to Jazz Recordings	3.5/4 stars

Bags' Groove (PRLP 7109) is a jazz album by Miles Davis, released in 1957 by Prestige, compiling material from two 10" LPs recorded in 1954, plus two alternative takes.

== Recording ==
Both takes of the title track come from a session on December 24, 1954, the first version having been previously released on Miles Davis All Stars, Volume 1 (PRLP 196). ("Bags" was vibraphonist Milt Jackson's nickname.) The other tracks recorded during this session may be found on Miles Davis and the Modern Jazz Giants (PRLP 7150), and all of them are also featured on the compilation album Thelonious Monk: The Complete Prestige Recordings. The rest of the album was recorded earlier in the year, on June 29, and four of the tracks had already been released as Miles Davis with Sonny Rollins (PRLP 187), with the fifth being a previously unreleased alternative take.

== Music ==
The title track was written by Milt "Bags" Jackson and the three compositions written by the young Sonny Rollins all went on to become jazz standards. On "Oleo", Davis uses a Harmon mute to obtain a unique timbre, one that would become an iconic aspect of his sound.

== Track listing ==
Prestige – LP 7109:

Side one
No.	Title	Writer(s)	Length
1.	"Bags' Groove" (Take 1)	Milt Jackson	11:16
2.	"Bags' Groove" (Take 2)	Jackson	9:24

Side two
No.	Title	Writer(s)	Length
1.	"Airegin"	Sonny Rollins	5:01
2.	"Oleo"	Rollins	5:14
3.	"But Not for Me" (Take 2)	George Gershwin; Ira Gershwin	4:36
4.	"Doxy"	Rollins	4:55
5.	"But Not for Me" (Take 1)	Gershwin; Gershwin	5:45
Total length:			46:11

== Personnel ==
=== June 29, 1954 (Side two) ===
- Miles Davis – trumpet
- Sonny Rollins – tenor saxophone
- Horace Silver – piano
- Percy Heath – bass
- Kenny Clarke – drums

=== December 24, 1954 (Side one) ===
- Miles Davis – trumpet
- Milt Jackson – vibraphone
- Thelonious Monk – piano
- Percy Heath – bass
- Kenny Clarke – drums
