= The Last Miles =

2005 book

- Author: George Cole
- Language: English
- Subject: biography
- Publisher: Equinox Publishing Ltd. & University of Michigan Press
- Publication date: March 1, 2005
- Publication place: United Kingdom
- Media type: Print
- Pages: 558
- ISBN: 1904768180

The Last Miles: The Music of Miles Davis, 1980-1991 is the biography of American jazz musician Miles Davis covering the period 1980 to 1991. First published in 2005, the book was written by British author and journalist George Cole. The initial publication was by Equinox on March 1, 2005, followed by University of Michigan Press on June 1, 2005.

The publication of George Cole's biography coincided with Miles Davis: The London Exhibition in 2005. May 21, 2015, an exhibition of Davis’ sketching and painting artwork was launched, which included a book signing by Cole.

== Background ==
George Cole researched Davis's music from 1980 to 1991 to explore and shed light on this era which was controversial and less understood compared to his earlier groundbreaking work in jazz.

Cole conducted numerous interviews with musicians, producers, and others who worked closely with Miles Davis during the 1980s and early 1990s. These included his work with Marcus Miller, John Scofield, Lenny White and others who contributed to Davis's albums and live performances.

== Reception ==
Kevin LeGendre for The Independent wrote, "George Cole… made a bold move with The Last Miles… shining the spotlight on that fuzzy final decade" adding "Cole’s analysis has a meticulous, forensic character."

Irwin Block of The Gazette wrote "Rather than seeking to stress the sensational in Davis’s controversial persona… Cole stays focused on the music. With more than 100 interviews to work with, there are also plenty of anecdotes to make this a rich and rewarding read."
