= Miles Davis with Sonny Rollins =

1954 studio album by Miles Davis

Studio album by Miles Davis
- Released: 1954
- Recorded: June 29, 1954
- Studio: Van Gelder (Hackensack)
- Genre: Jazz
- Length: 20:55
- Label: Prestige
- Producer: Bob Weinstock

Miles Davis chronology
Miles Davis Quintet (1954)	Miles Davis with Sonny Rollins (1954)	Miles Davis; All Stars, Volume 1 (1954)

Professional ratings
Review scores
Source	Rating
The Encyclopedia of Popular Music	3/5 stars

Miles Davis with Sonny Rollins (PRLP 187) is a 1954 10-inch LP album by Miles Davis, released by Prestige Records. The four tracks on this LP, along with a second take of "But Not For Me", were recorded at Rudy Van Gelder's Studio, Hackensack, New Jersey, on June 29, 1954.

The album showcases the musical and compositional abilities of Sonny Rollins, who was Davis's favored saxophonist at this point in his career. Three of the four tunes were Sonny Rollins originals, and would go on to become regular parts of live sets played by both Davis and Rollins. Davis says in his autobiography that Rollins was writing the music on scraps of paper in the studio during the recording session. Davis also states that the cover of Gershwin's "But Not for Me" was an early example of himself being influenced by the spacing and lyricism of pianist Ahmad Jamal.

After the 10" LP format was discontinued, all four tracks, along with the alternate take, were included on side 2 of the 12" album Bags' Groove (PRLP 7109).

== Track listing ==
Side one
No.	Title	Writer(s)	Length
1.	"Airegin"	Sonny Rollins	5:01
2.	"Oleo"	Sonny Rollins	5:14

Side two
No.	Title	Writer(s)	Length
1.	"But Not for Me"	George Gershwin, Ira Gershwin	5:45
2.	"Doxy"	Sonny Rollins	4:55
Total length:			20:55

== Personnel ==
- Miles Davis – Trumpet
- Sonny Rollins – Tenor Saxophone
- Horace Silver – Piano
- Percy Heath – Bass
- Kenny Clarke – Drums
