= Airegin =

1954 jazz standard composed by Sonny Rollins

"Airegin" is a jazz standard composed by American jazz saxophonist Sonny Rollins in 1954. Rollins chose the name because it spells "Nigeria" when read backwards.

== Recording history ==
"Airegin" was first recorded in 1954 by the Miles Davis Quintet and released in the US on the 10" LP Miles Davis with Sonny Rollins. The personnel on that recording were Davis (trumpet), Sonny Rollins (tenor saxophone), Horace Silver (piano), Percy Heath (bass), and Kenny Clarke (drums).

It was recorded again by Davis's quintet in 1956 on their album Cookin' with The Miles Davis Quintet. Guitarist Wes Montgomery released a version in 1960 on his album The Incredible Jazz Guitar of Wes Montgomery (also with Percy Heath on bass). Jazz guitarist Grant Green released a version on his album Nigeria, which was recorded in 1962 but not released until 1980.

"Airegin" was also covered by Hubert Laws, featuring session drummer Steve Gadd playing a very fast samba pattern behind Laws's piccolo. Maynard Ferguson recorded it twice: first, a version where he played an overdubbed three-way solo with himself on his 1964 album Color Him Wild, and second, on his 1977 release New Vintage. An organ-driven hard bop version was recorded by Sonny Stitt and Don Patterson on their 1969 Prestige album Funk You!.

A vocal version, with lyrics written by Jon Hendricks, appeared on the 1958 Lambert, Hendricks & Ross album The Swingers! and the 1985 Manhattan Transfer album Vocalese.
