= Miles Davis and the Modern Jazz Giants =

Compilation album by Miles Davis
- Released: May 1959
- Recorded: December 24, 1954 and October 26, 1956
- Studio: Van Gelder (Hackensack)
- Genre: Jazz
- Length: 42:12
- Label: Prestige; PRLP 7150
- Producer: Bob Weinstock

Miles Davis chronology
Porgy and Bess (1959)	Miles Davis and the Modern Jazz Giants (1959)	Kind of Blue (1959)

Professional ratings
Review scores
Source	Rating
All About Jazz	(favorable)
AllMusic	5/5 stars
The Encyclopedia of Popular Music	3/5 stars
The Penguin Guide to Jazz Recordings	4/4 stars

Miles Davis and the Modern Jazz Giants (PRLP 7150) is an album by Miles Davis, released on Prestige Records in 1959. Most of the material comes from a session on December 24, 1954, featuring Thelonious Monk and Milt Jackson, and had been previously released in the discontinued ten inch LP format. "Swing Spring" was originally released on the 10"LP Miles Davis All Stars, Volume 1 (PRLP 196), and "Bemsha Swing" and "The Man I Love" (take 2) had been previously released on Volume 2 (PRLP 200). "'Round Midnight" is newly released, and comes from the same sessions by Davis's new quintet in 1956 which resulted in Steamin' with the Miles Davis Quintet (PRLP 7200) and three other albums to fulfill Davis's contract with Prestige.

== The 1954 session ==
The 1954 session was Davis accompanied by members of the Modern Jazz Quartet, and Thelonious Monk. Notable as the only time Thelonious Monk made a studio recording with Davis—the two men did not get on well, as Davis felt Monk ought to be "laying out" (refraining from playing) during the trumpeter's solos—this session also resulted in the title track to Bags' Groove. Ira Gitler, who was present at the session and wrote the sleevenotes for the album, dispels the myth that the two men confronted each other physically, but there was argument throughout the session. The first take of "The Man I Love" has a false start caused by Monk asking when he should start playing, and an exasperated Davis telling engineer Rudy Van Gelder, "Hey Rudy, put this on the record, man – all of it!". In his autobiography, Davis recalls "When I heard stories later saying that me and him was almost about to fight after I had him lay out while I was playing on 'Bags' Groove,' I was shocked, because Monk and I were, first, very close, and second, he was too big and strong for me to even be thinking about fighting [...] All I did was tell him to lay out when I was playing. My asking him to lay out had something to do with music, not friendship. He used to tell cats to lay out himself."

== Track listing ==
Side one
No.	Title	Writer(s)	Length
1.	"The Man I Love" (Take 2)	George Gershwin, Ira Gershwin	7:59
2.	"Swing Spring"	Miles Davis	10:46

Side two
No.	Title	Writer(s)	Length
1.	"'Round Midnight"	Bernie Hanighen, Cootie Williams, Thelonious Monk	5:25
2.	"Bemsha Swing"	Thelonious Monk, Denzil Best	9:33
3.	"The Man I Love" (Take 1)	George Gershwin, Ira Gershwin	8:29
Total length:			42:12

== Personnel ==
- Miles Davis – trumpet
- John Coltrane – tenor saxophone on "'Round Midnight"
- Milt Jackson – vibraphone
- Thelonious Monk – piano
- Red Garland – piano on "'Round Midnight"
- Percy Heath – bass
- Paul Chambers – bass on "'Round Midnight"
- Kenny Clarke – drums
- Philly Joe Jones – drums on "'Round Midnight"
