= Jews in jazz =

Jewish people in Jazz

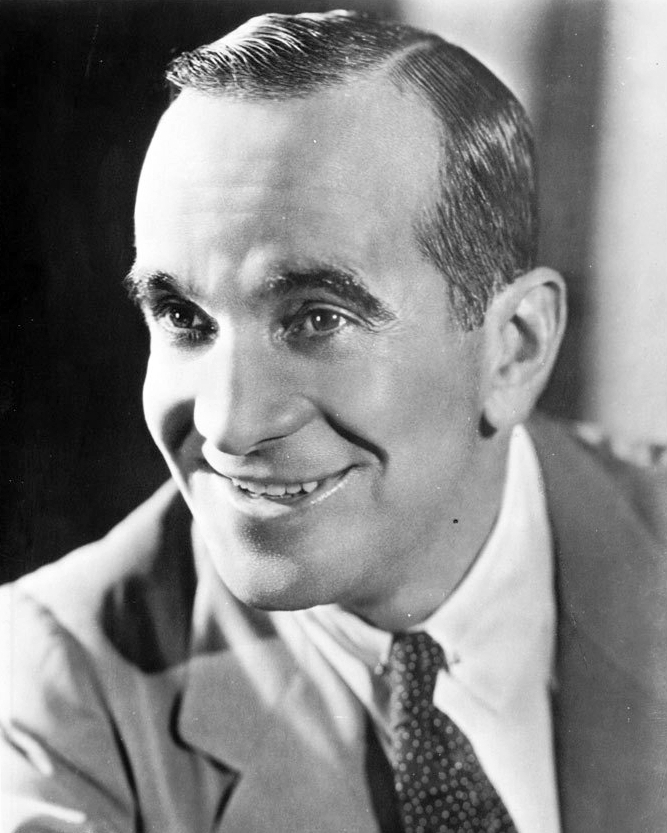
Al Jolson in 1929

Jews have played a significant role in jazz, a music genre created and developed by African Americans. As jazz spread, it developed to encompass many different cultures, and the work of Jewish composers in Tin Pan Alley helped shape the many different sounds that jazz came to incorporate. Tunes by Jewish composers such as George Gershwin, Harold Arlen, Jerome Kern, Richard Rodgers, Irving Berlin and many others predominate among the 'Great American Songbook' compositions that have become jazz standards. Jazz musicians, besides playing renditions of the melodies, often deployed the chord changes of many of these songs to construct their own compositions.

== Background ==
Jazz music is a multicultural music, created and developed by African Americans using European instruments with Jewish Americans and others mixing in to further diversify the music. Jazz music was invented in the late nineteenth and early twentieth centuries. Originating in New Orleans, the music gained its momentum by getting a start in the red light districts. African Americans playing ragtime in the red light districts were the precursor to what was soon to become jazz. As World War I came to a close jazz started to enter the public arena. Two years later the prohibition of alcohol went into effect. This resulted in the creation of speakeasies, which allowed for jazz music to flourish.

== Jewish American contributions ==
Jewish Americans were able to thrive in jazz because of the probationary whiteness that they were allotted at the time. George Bornstein wrote that African Americans were sympathetic to the plight of the Jewish American and vice versa. As disenfranchised minorities themselves, Jewish composers of popular music saw themselves as natural allies with African-Americans. This enabled them to make music that was promoted and heard as "black music".

In the 1920s and 1930s, George Gershwin and others deliberately minimized their Jewish identity at a time when Jews were not fully accepted as Americans, instead attempting to create musical version of an inclusive America. They saw their music as an example of an America without prejudice.

In the 1940s and 1950s, Mezz Mezzrow, Symphony Sid, Red Rodney, and Roz Cron experimented with black identity in various ways. Some contend that, in varying degrees, this was in order to "re-minoritize" Jewishness. Symphony Sid won several awards from black organizations, including an award for Disc Jockey of the Year presented to him in 1949 by the Global News Syndicate, for his "continuous promotion of negro artists".

Louis Armstrong was willing to show his sympathy in an outspoken manner, going as far as being photographed wearing a Star of David necklace. Willie "The Lion" Smith grew up alongside Jewish Americans and later discovering he had a Jewish ancestor of his own, ultimately converting to the religion. The adoption of ideas and music wasn't solely one-directional; Black musicians also adopted Jewish music. Willie "The Lion" Smith, Slim Gaillard (who was also Jewish), Cab Calloway, and other black musicians played Jewish and Jewish themed songs.

In the 1930s, some Jewish musicians actively worked with black musicians at a time when such interactions were taboo. Benny Goodman, Artie Shaw and others fought for integration. Concert promoter and record producer Norman Granz and Barney Josephson, who opened the first integrated night club Café Society, broke down barriers of segregation.

The 1927 film The Jazz Singer with Al Jolson is one example of how Jewish Americans were able to bring jazz, music that African Americans developed, and into popular culture. Ted Merwin wrote that the film was seen as a glorification of Jewish assimilation into American culture.

Benny Goodman was a vital Jewish American to the progression of jazz. Goodman was the leader of a racially integrated band named King of Swing. His jazz concert in the Carnegie Hall in 1938 was the first ever to be played there. The concert was described by Bruce Eder as "the single most important jazz or popular music concert in history: jazz's 'coming out' party to the world of 'respectable' music.". Another Jewish contemporary, Artie Shaw, like Goodman a superlative clarinetist, was also prominent in integrating his bands.

Shep Fields was also regarded throughout the nation as the conductor of his Rippling Rhythm "Sweet" big-band. His appearances and big band remote radio broadcasts from such landmark venues as Chicago's Palmer House, Broadway's Paramount Theater, the Copacabana nightclub and the Starlight Roof at the famed Waldorf-Astoria Hotel entertained audiences with a unique musical style which remained popular with audiences for nearly three decades from the 1930s until the late 1950s.

Many Jews became successful in the jazz industry through performing or promoting jazz music. Mike Gerber has written extensively on this, covering such figures as Barney Josephson, Irving Mills, Joe Glaser, Milt Gabler, Alfred Lion, Francis Wolff, Herman Lubinsky, Teddy Reig, Orrin Keepnews, Lester Koenig, Max and Lorraine Gordon, Norman Granz and George Wein. This raised accusations of exploitation of black musicians. These accusations were sometimes rooted in stereotypes.

"Jewish jazz" was an attempt to combine Jewish music and jazz into a new genre. It began in the 1930s with "Jewish Swing". It continued in the 1960s with albums by Shelly Manne and Terry Gibbs. It had a resurgence in the 1990s, with albums by John Zorn, Steven Bernstein, Paul Shapiro, and others. According to Charles Hersch, at its best Jewish jazz both affirmed Jewishness and revealed connections to African American culture.

== Jewish women in Jazz ==
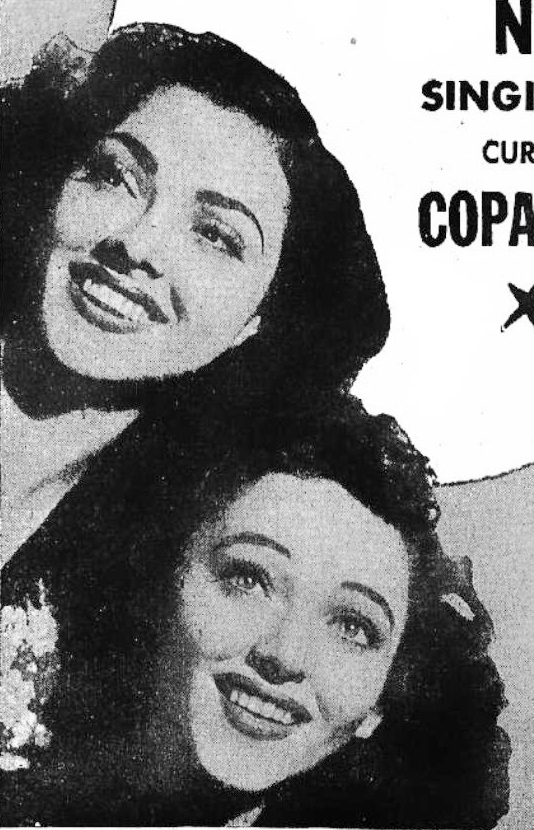
The Barry Sisters, a Jazz duo that combined elements of Jewish music with Jazz

Jewish women have played an important role in the development of Jazz as achieved success in the field as vocalists, instrumentalists, and in Jazz' musical business.

The impact of Jewish identity on these musicians' work varies, with their Jewishness intersecting intriguingly with other aspects of their identities, particularly their femininity. During the swing era of the 1930s and beyond, several Jewish women, especially in the United States became notable big band singers. In the late 1940s and 1950s, as bebop transformed jazz, Jewish women continued to thrive in the genre.

From the 1960s and 1970s onward, Jewish women in jazz embraced a broader array of instruments. Additionally, as jazz gained international prominence, Jewish female jazz musicians from various parts of the world, notably the United States, Israel and Europe began to play a bigger role.

=== The Swing Era ===
In the swing era of the 1930s and beyond, numerous Jewish women achieved prominence as big band singers. Helen Forrest (born Fogel, 1917–1999) stood out, lending her vocals to major white big bands such as Artie Shaw, Benny Goodman, and Harry James. Renowned for her flawless pitch and melodic sensibility, she became one of the era's most popular female vocalists, earning the moniker "the voice of the name bands." Kitty Kallen (1921–2016), the daughter of Russian Jewish immigrants, also made a mark, showcasing her talent with acclaimed bands like Artie Shaw, Jack Teagarden, Harry James, and Jimmy Dorsey. Despite not emphasizing their Jewish heritage in their music, Fran Warren (1926–2013) and Georgia Gibbs (1919–2006) garnered acclaim as big band singers, contributing to both white and black ensembles.

In a distinctive fusion of jazz and Jewish music, Merna (1923–1976) and Claire Barry (1920–2014), born Minnie and Clara Bagelman, found success as the Barry sisters. Performing jazz songs in Yiddish, including those at the Catskills, on television, and the "Yiddish Melodies in Swing" radio show, they incorporated liturgical pieces and popular Jewish melodies into their repertoire. Drummer Florence "Fagle" Liebman (1922–2011) embraced a different approach, briefly passing as black while playing with the all-female African American big band, The International Sweethearts of Rhythm. Her versatility allowed her to collaborate with jazz luminaries such as Sarah Vaughan, Oscar Peterson, Dinah Washington, and Ray Brown.

=== 1940s – 1950s ===
In the late 1940s and 1950s, Jewish women made significant contributions to jazz, a period marked by the expansion of jazz through the emergence of bebop. Barbara Carroll, a notable figure, showcased her piano and vocal talents in various trios, earning praise from prominent critic Leonard Feather, who hailed her as "the first girl ever to play bebop piano." Sylvia Syms (born Blagman, 1917–1992) immersed herself in the vibrant jazz scene of New York's 52nd Street clubs during her upbringing, listening to icons such as Billie Holiday, Lester Young, and Art Tatum. By the 1940s, she was singing in these clubs, earning acclaim from jazz icons like Holiday, Frank Sinatra, and Duke Ellington. Teddi King (1929–1977), another gifted vocalist, commenced her career in the 1940s, collaborating with musicians like Beryl Booker, Nat Pierce, George Shearing, and Dave McKenna. Noted for her sensitive interpretation of lyrics, King received accolades for her performances. Corky Hale (born Marilyn Hecht, 1936) gained recognition for her dynamic soloing and piano accompaniment but became particularly renowned for her success as one of the few jazz harpists. Acknowledging the male-dominated nature of jazz, Hale resisted all-female bands, emphasizing her desire to succeed as a musician by working with male counterparts.

=== 1960s – Today ===
==== In the United States ====
In the 1960s and beyond. Renowned singer and pianist Judy Roberts (b. 1942) boasts a discography of over twenty albums and multiple Grammy nominations. Janis Siegel (b. 1952), celebrated for her role in the Manhattan Transfer, contributed to the group's ten Grammy wins, showcasing their expertise in both jazz and popular music, particularly with Siegel's arrangement of "Birdland" in 1981.

Amidst the second-wave feminism movement, Jewish women in jazz challenged traditional boundaries, exemplified by vocalists Madeline Eastman (b. 1954) and Kitty Margolis (b. 1955), who founded the independent record label Mad Kat. Taking greater economic control of their careers, they recorded albums featuring acclaimed jazz musicians as sidemen.

Furthermore, women increasingly excelled in traditionally "male" instruments, with notable woodwind players emerging in the 1970s. Soprano saxophonist and composer Jane Ira Bloom (b. 1955) stood out not only in mainstream jazz but also as a pioneer in electronic collaborations with dancers, classical musicians, and artists from Asian musical traditions. Lena Bloch (b. 1971), a saxophonist with roots in Russia, Israel, and Europe, garnered acclaim for her albums blending Eastern European, Middle Eastern, and Western classical influences within the framework of the Lennie Tristano school of improvisation.

Four Jewish women pianists have gained recognition for pushing musical boundaries. Myra Melford (b. 1957) stands as an avant-garde jazz pioneer, collaborating with Art Ensemble of Chicago's Joseph Jarman, Henry Threadgill, Butch Morris, Leroy Jenkins, and others. Besides her jazz endeavors, Melford has delved into Indian classical music. Michele Rosewoman (b. 1953) boasts nine recorded albums, working with avant-garde jazz figures like Oliver Lake and Billy Bang, as well as mainstream artists such as Freddie Waits and Rufus Reid. Notably, Rosewoman has excelled in Latin music, leading her Afro-Cuban big band, the "New Yor-Uba ensemble." Marilyn Crispell (b. 1947), classically trained, transitioned to jazz inspired by John Coltrane's A Love Supreme. Known for her tumultuous solo albums and a decade-long collaboration with free jazz saxophonist Anthony Braxton, Crispell evolved toward a more lyrical style in her later career. Influenced by Ornette Coleman and Albert Ayler, Annette Peacock (b. 1941) pioneered the "free-form song," devoid of a steady beat or predetermined harmony. Her innovative compositions, recorded by various jazz musicians, showcase her distinctive use of the Moog synthesizer, while her keyboard and vocal work extended into the realm of "art rock."

==== In Israel ====
Jazz has been prevalent in Israel since the British Mandate, however it only gained traction locally in the 1990s. Several Jewish Israeli women were prominent including Liz Magnes (b.1943), Edna Goren (b. 1945), a jazz singer of Yemenite origin known as "the first lady of Israeli jazz" (piano), and Iris Portugal (b.1966).

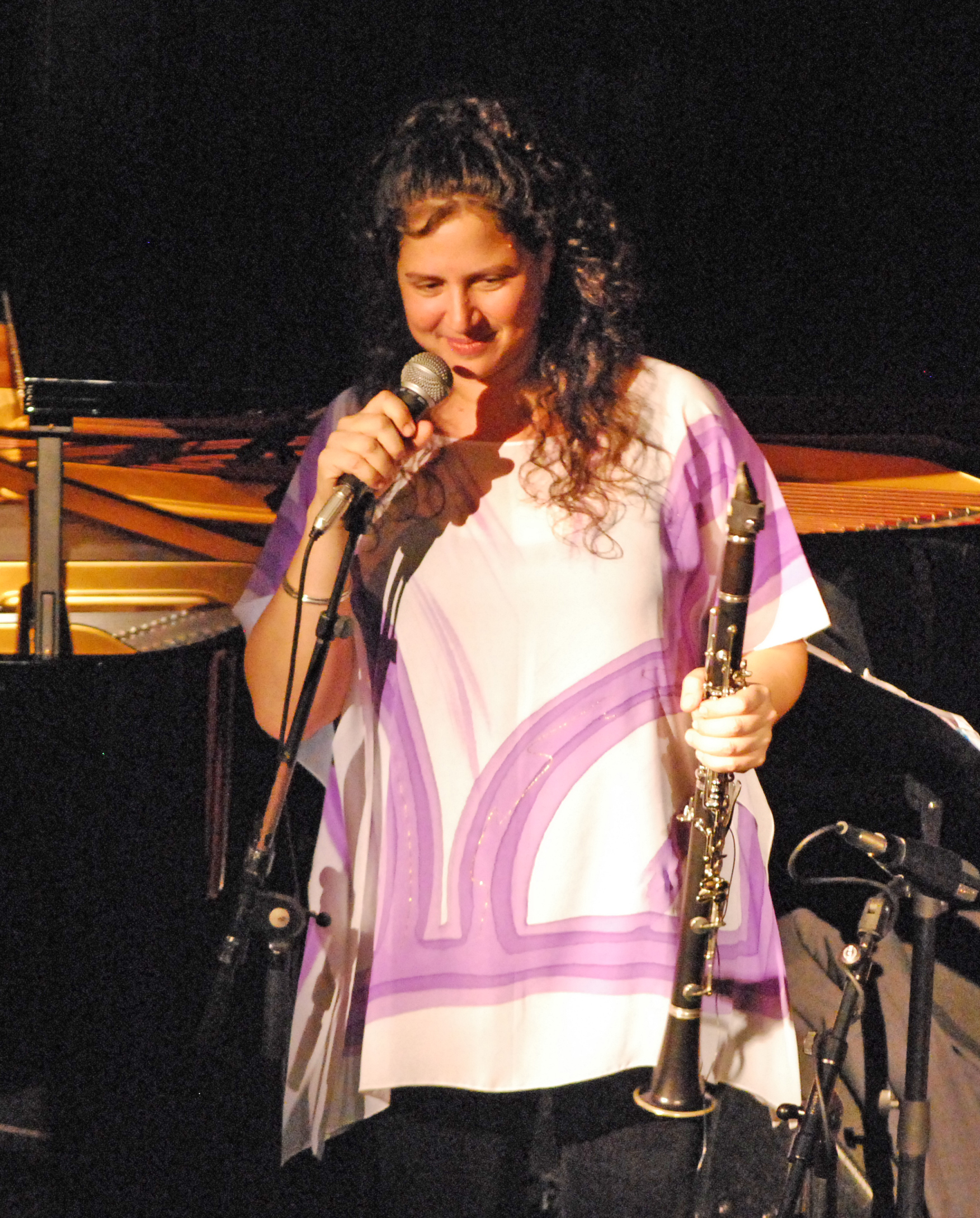
Anat Cohen

Anat Cohen, an Israeli saxophonist and clarinetist, has delved into an extensive array of musical styles within jazz and beyond, encompassing Israeli tunes and the rhythms of Brazilian and Cuban music. While she is primarily recognized for her prowess on the clarinet, an instrument less common in contemporary jazz, Cohen identifies herself as an "international musician," also saying "I try to bring that to all of the music I play. Music has no borders and no flags.", in an interview for the Jewish Journal.

Julia Feldman, born in Russia in 1979 and now residing in Israel, is both a vocalist and pianist.^{[3]} In 2006, her ensemble paid tribute to Billie Holiday through a recording. Since then, Feldman has showcased her musical versatility, engaging in a diverse range of styles in both live performances and recordings.^{[4][5]} Sophie Milman, also originally from Russia but raised in Israel and born in 1983, has gained recognition as a singer based in Canada. Her distinct and composed vocal style has earned acclaim, and she has collaborated with notable figures like Gary Burton, Chick Corea, and the Manhattan Transfer, transcending boundaries between jazz and pop music realms.

=== In the music business ===
Jewish women have left their mark on the jazz music industry, making contributions both formally and informally. Miriam Bienstock (1923–2015), daughter to Russian-Jewish immigrants, played an important role during the early years of Atlantic Records, a label founded in 1947 that recorded numerous significant jazz and pop artists. Bienstock assumed various responsibilities within the label, serving as a talent scout, bookkeeper, deal negotiator, and overseeing day-to-day operations.

Baroness Pannonica de Koenigswarter, known as "the baroness of Jazz", originally from England and born Rothschild, had sporadic involvement in the music business, primarily as a manager. However, she emerged as a crucial benefactor to bebop musicians during the 1940s and 1950s. Her support extended beyond financial aid, encompassing actions such as covering rent, providing accommodations, buying food, offering transportation, assisting with employment opportunities, and hosting jam sessions at her apartment. Beyond tangible assistance, she offered invaluable encouragement and support to musicians. Due to her contributions, she became an integral part of musicians' circles, earning their admiration to the extent that several notable jazz compositions, including three by the renowned pianist-composer Thelonious Monk, bear her name in the title.

== Notable figures ==
- Willie "The Lion" Smith
- Teddy Charles
- Irving Berlin
- Ziggy Elman
- Shep Fields
- George Gershwin and Ira Gershwin
- Benny Goodman
- Joe Glasser
- Herbie Mann
- Stan Getz
- Lee Konitz
- Al Jolson
- Buddy Rich
- Artie Shaw
- Paul Bley
- John Zorn
- Kurt Weill
- Slim Gaillard

== See also ==
- Jewish influence in rhythm and blues
- Black performance of Jewish music
