= Junior Collins =

American jazz musician (1927–1976)

- Born: Addison Collins Jr. April 17, 1927; Pine Bluff, Arkansas, U.S.
- Died: March 14, 1976 (aged 49)
- Genre: Jazz
- Instruments: French horn

Addison Collins Jr. (April 17, 1927 – March 14, 1976) was an American French horn player.

== Background ==
Born in Pine Bluff, Arkansas, Collins was a member of Glenn Miller's Army Air Force band, and Claude Thornhill's orchestra. He later played with Charlie Parker, Gerry Mulligan, and the nonet featured on Miles Davis' Birth of the Cool.
