= Ballads and Blues =

Ballads and Blues may refer to:

- Ballads & Blues (Milt Jackson album), 1956
- Odetta Sings Ballads and Blues, 1957 debut album by folk singer Odetta
- Ballads & Blues (The Mastersounds album), 1959
- Ballads, Blues and Boasters a 1964 album by Harry Belafonte
- Ballads and Blues (Miles Davis album), compilation album by American jazz musician Miles Davis
- Ballads and Blues (George Winston album), 1972 debut album by American pianist George Winston
- Ballads & Blues (Tommy Flanagan album), 1978
- Ballads & Blues 1982–1994, compilation album by Northern-Irish rock musician Gary Moore
- Ballads, Blues & Stories a 2001 album by Bret Michaels
