= All's Fair in Oven War =

- The Simpsons episode
- Episode no.: Season 16; Episode 2
- Directed by: Mark Kirkland
- Written by: Matt Selman
- Production code: FABF20
- Original air date: November 14, 2004

Guest appearances
- James Caan as himself; Thomas Pynchon as himself; Marcia Wallace as Edna Krabappel

Episode features
- Couch gag: The couch is seen outside in a clearing and mounted on a catapult. The Simpson family sits down and get launched over a mountain range.
- Commentary: Matt Groening; Al Jean; Matt Selman; Ian Maxtone-Graham; Tim Long; Michael Price; Mike Scully; Joel H. Cohen; Mike B. Anderson

Episode chronology
← Previous "Treehouse of Horror XV"	Next → "Sleeping with the Enemy"
- The Simpsons season 16

"All's Fair in Oven War" is the second episode of the sixteenth season of the American animated television series The Simpsons. It originally aired on the Fox network in the United States on November 14, 2004. In the episode, Marge gets her kitchen remodeled and the dishes she makes inside it get rave reviews. The suggestion of Ned Flanders leads her to enter a cooking contest. However, Marge realizes the competition is harder than it seems. Meanwhile, Bart finds Homer's vintage Playdude magazines and decides to adopt the lifestyle he sees within the articles.

Matt Selman wrote the episode, and Mark Kirkland served as director. Thomas Pynchon and James Caan guest starred as themselves. The episode features cultural references to songs such as "Separate Ways", "Boplicity", and "Take Five", as well as references to the film The Godfather and various fictional food mascots. The episode received positive reviews from critics.

== Plot ==
Discovering that the house next to theirs is up for sale, Homer and Marge marvel at its extensive kitchen. Marge asks Homer to hire a contractor to upgrade their kitchen, but Homer decides to save money by doing the job himself. His ineptitude leads Marge to hire a contractor; the upgrade ultimately takes two years and costs the family $100,000. The first dish that Marge cooks in the completed kitchen, wasabi Buffalo wings, earns rave reviews from many Springfieldians, as well as author Thomas Pynchon.

While shopping at the Kwik-E-Mart, Marge learns that the Ovenfresh company is sponsoring a baking contest in which the grand prize winner will become Auntie Ovenfresh, the company's spokeswoman. Encouraged by Ned Flanders, she enters her recipe for a dessert styled as hot dogs and is accepted. During the competition, she is constantly mocked by the other contestants, and her dish is later sabotaged and burnt. Marge is able to get her entry into the judging room just before it closes, though Agnes Skinner fails to get her dish into the room. Angered by the behaviour of her competitors, Marge secretly taints their dishes with Maggie's ear medicine to ruin the taste. Lisa sees Marge cheat and confronts her, but Marge defends herself by saying that the others bullied her into it.

Marge reaches the finals, competing against Brandine Spuckler, whose dish was not tainted because Marge dismissed it as garbage. Marge changes her mind over cheating again in the final after finding a note from Lisa, and admits her wrongdoing, restoring Lisa's faith in her. Brandine becomes the new Auntie Ovenfresh and leaves her husband Cletus for James Caan. Cletus' friends ambush Caan at a tollbooth and shoot him repeatedly, reminiscent of the death of Sonny Corleone, Caan's character in the film The Godfather. He survives the shooting and angrily says that he will fly instead of drive the next time he needs to travel.

Meanwhile, Homer finds his old stash of Playdude magazines while trying to remodel the kitchen, but throws them away after Marge cuts out all the nude pictures. Bart and Milhouse find the magazines in the trash and, after reading them, decide to remodel their treehouse and adopt the lifestyle espoused in the articles. They develop an interest in luxurious living and jazz music and begin speaking in sexual innuendos without understanding their meaning, and the treehouse quickly becomes a popular hangout similar to the Playboy Club. Learning that Bart has read the magazines, Homer has a talk with him about sex. Horrified at what he learns, Bart quickly spreads the word to the other children of Springfield, unsettling them as well and bringing their Playdude fascination to an end.

== Production ==
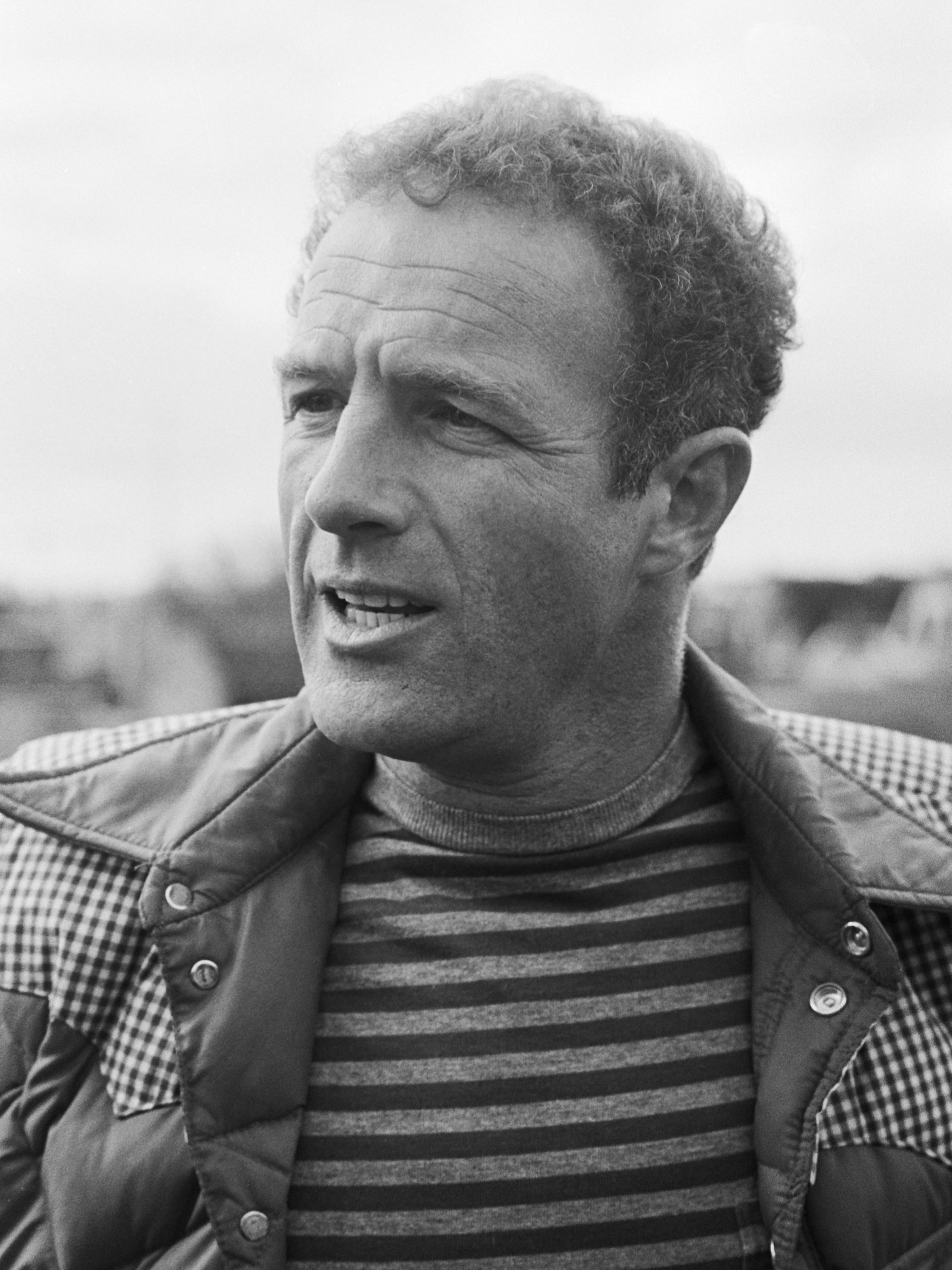
James Caan guest starred in the episode as himself.

The episode was written by Matt Selman, his eleventh writing credit for The Simpsons. The episode was the first season sixteen episode that Mark Kirkland directed.

Reclusive novelist Thomas Pynchon guest stars as himself in the episode, wearing a paper bag over his head. His role is reprised from the season 15 episode "Diatribe of a Mad Housewife". According to executive producer Al Jean, Pynchon helped write the jokes for his appearances. James Caan also guest stars in the episode, first seen in Bart's treehouse. He is then shown dating Brandine Spuckler, and he is later shot by hillbillies at a toll booth. Thomas Pynchon offers insight on Marge’s cooking. Pynchon contributes his own jokes—including a pun he made on his best-known work, The Frying Of Latke 49. Pynchon refused to call Homer a "fat-ass" as he did not want to speak ill of him.

In the original version of this episode, after Homer tells Marge that she is the "best chef in the house", Marge grumbles, "Eh, BFD", which stands for "big, fucking deal". On Sunday night FOX repeats, the "F" in "BFD" is muted out. The original line can be heard in syndicated and UK reruns. The syndicated version also credits Russi Taylor, who was not credited in the original version of the episode. The Godfather parody was cut short in the UK version, and several sexual references from Bart's "playdude" plot were removed. The show in the UK is broadcast at six and needed to be appropriate for children.

== Cultural references ==
The episode's title is a play on the saying "All's fair in love and war", a proverb found in John Lyly's 16th-century book Euphues that is commonly used to justify cheating. The episode features three different songs. The song "Separate Ways (Worlds Apart)" by Journey is played in the background during Homer's fantasy of him living next to himself. "Boplicity" by Miles Davis is listened to by Bart and Milhouse, and "Take Five" by The Dave Brubeck Quartet is played in the background at Bart's treehouse. The episode's final scene, showing James Caan being ambushed by hillbillies at a toll booth, is a parody of a scene in the film The Godfather when Sonny Corleone, portrayed by Caan, is shot and killed at a toll booth. Marge suggesting that the pope has been letting things slide lately, is a reference to the sex abuse scandal of the early 2000s.

== Reception ==
In its original American broadcast, "All's Fair in Oven War" garnered roughly 11.64 million viewers. The episode received a 6.4 Nielsen rating.

The episode has garnered positive reviews from critics. Eric Messinger of Springfield Weekly gave the episode a positive review. He gave the episode a B−, stating the Marge segment "needed a bit more fine-tuning". However, he praised the Bart segment, stating that it saved the episode, and that Bart not seeing nudity in the Playdude magazines worked well in every joke, and the segment was almost reminiscent to the season three episode "Bart the Murderer". He also praised the James Caan guest appearance, stating it "worked quite well, especially with the Godfather ending pay-off." In 2012, New York magazine named "All Fair's in Oven War" as one of the ten best later Simpsons episodes. Pip Ellwood-Hughes of Entertainment Focus considered the episode a highlight of the season. Chris Morgan of Cinema Sentries praised the episode and commented "It is, arguably, the best episode to air after the turn of the millennium, and, in fact, is one of the top episodes of the show, period." A review of the season 16 DVD on alternativeaddiction.com listed it as one of "some incredibly fun episode ideas". On Rolling Stone's top 150 Simpsons episodes they placed "All's Fair in Oven War" at #89.
