= Birth of the Cool =

1957 album by Miles Davis

Compilation album by Miles Davis
- Released: February or March 1957
- Recorded: January 21 and April 22, 1949; March 9, 1950; in New York City
- Studio: WOR Studio
- Genre: Cool jazz
- Length: 35:29
- Label: Capitol Jazz T-762
- Producers: Walter Rivers, Pete Rugolo

Miles Davis chronology
Collectors' Items (1956)	Birth of the Cool (1957)	'Round About Midnight (1957)

Miles Davis compilation chronology
Miles Davis Volume 2 (1955)	Birth of the Cool (1957)	Miles Davis' Greatest Hits (1969)

Birth of the Cool is a compilation album by the American jazz trumpeter and bandleader Miles Davis. It was released in February or March 1957 on Capitol Records. It compiles twelve tracks recorded by Davis's nonet for the label over the course of three sessions during 1949 and 1950.

Featuring unusual instrumentation and several notable musicians, the music consisted of innovative arrangements influenced by Afro-American music and classical music techniques, and marked a major development in post-bebop jazz. As the title suggests, these recordings are considered seminal in the history of cool jazz. Most of them were originally released in the 10-inch 78-rpm format and are all approximately three minutes long.

== Background ==
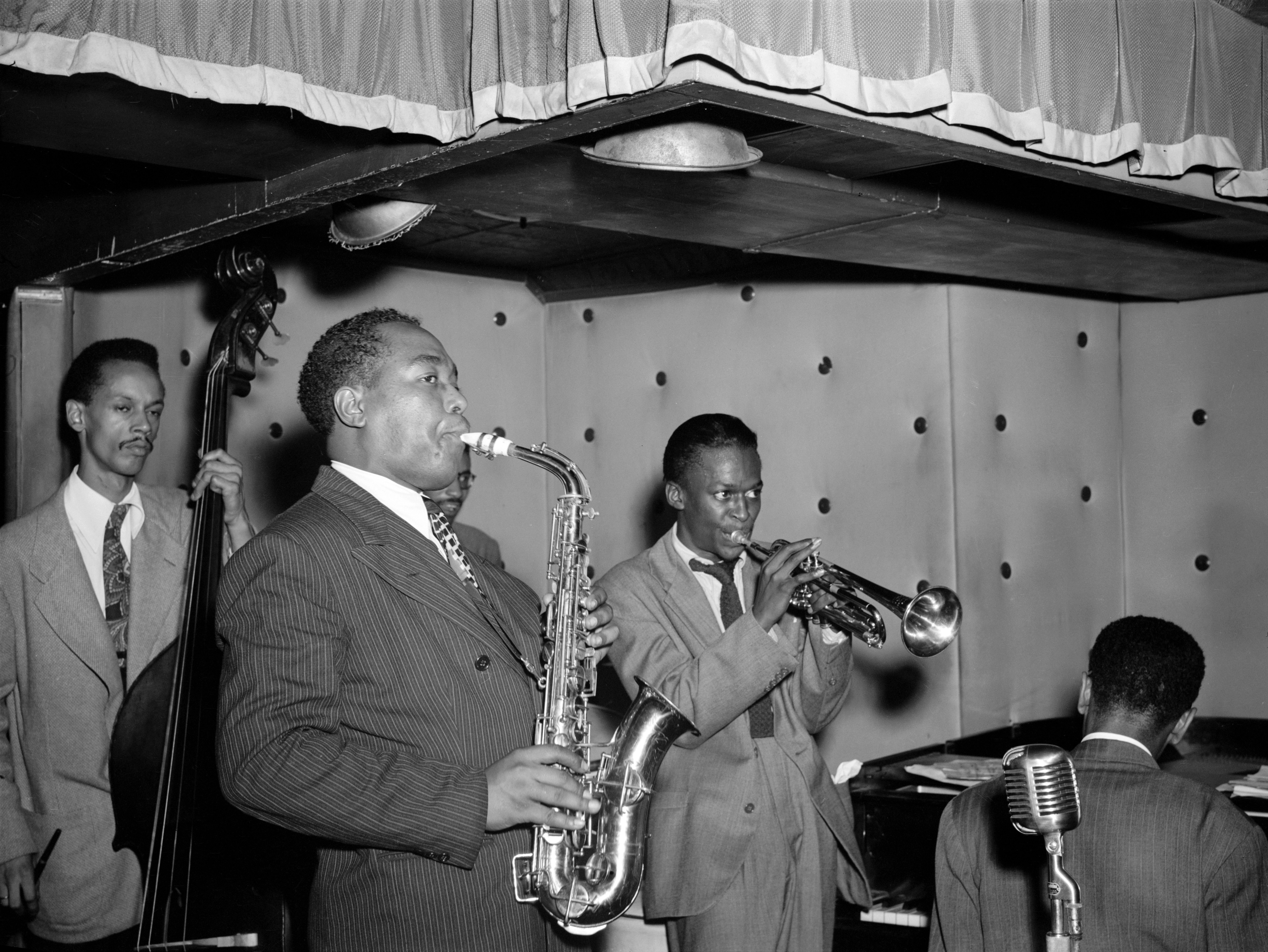
Davis (right center) playing in Charlie Parker's quintet, 1947

From 1944 to 1948, Miles Davis played in Charlie Parker's quintet. Davis recorded several sides with Parker during this period, most released for the Savoy and Dial labels. Davis's first records released under his own name were recorded with Parker's band, in 1947, and were more arranged and rehearsed than Parker's usual approach to recording. By 1948, Davis had three years of bebop playing under his belt, but he struggled to match the speed and ranges of the likes of Gillespie and Parker, choosing instead to play in the mid range of his instrument. In 1948, becoming increasingly concerned about growing tensions within the Parker quintet, Davis left the group and began looking for a new band to work with.

At the same time, arranger Gil Evans began hosting gatherings of like-minded, forward-looking musicians at his small basement apartment on 55th Street in Manhattan, three blocks from the jazz nightclubs of 52nd Street. Evans had gained a reputation in the jazz world for his orchestration of bebop tunes for the Claude Thornhill orchestra in the mid-1940s. Keeping an open door policy, Evans's apartment came to host many of the young jazz artists of late-1940s New York. The participants discussed the future of jazz, including a proposed group with a new sound. According to jazz historian Ted Gioia:

[The participants] were developing a range of tools that would change the sound of contemporary music. In their work together, they relied on a rich palette of harmonies, many of them drawn from European impressionist composers. They explored new instrumental textures, preferring to blend the voices of the horns like a choir rather than pit them against each other as the big bands had traditionally done with their thrusting and parrying sections. They brought down the tempos of their music ... they adopted a more lyrical approach to improvisation ...

Before recording in the studio, the band played a two-week engagement at New York City's Royal Roost club in September 1948. In the audience was Pete Rugolo, who signed the group to record for Capitol. Recordings from two nights made for a WMCA broadcast were eventually released decades later.

== Recording ==
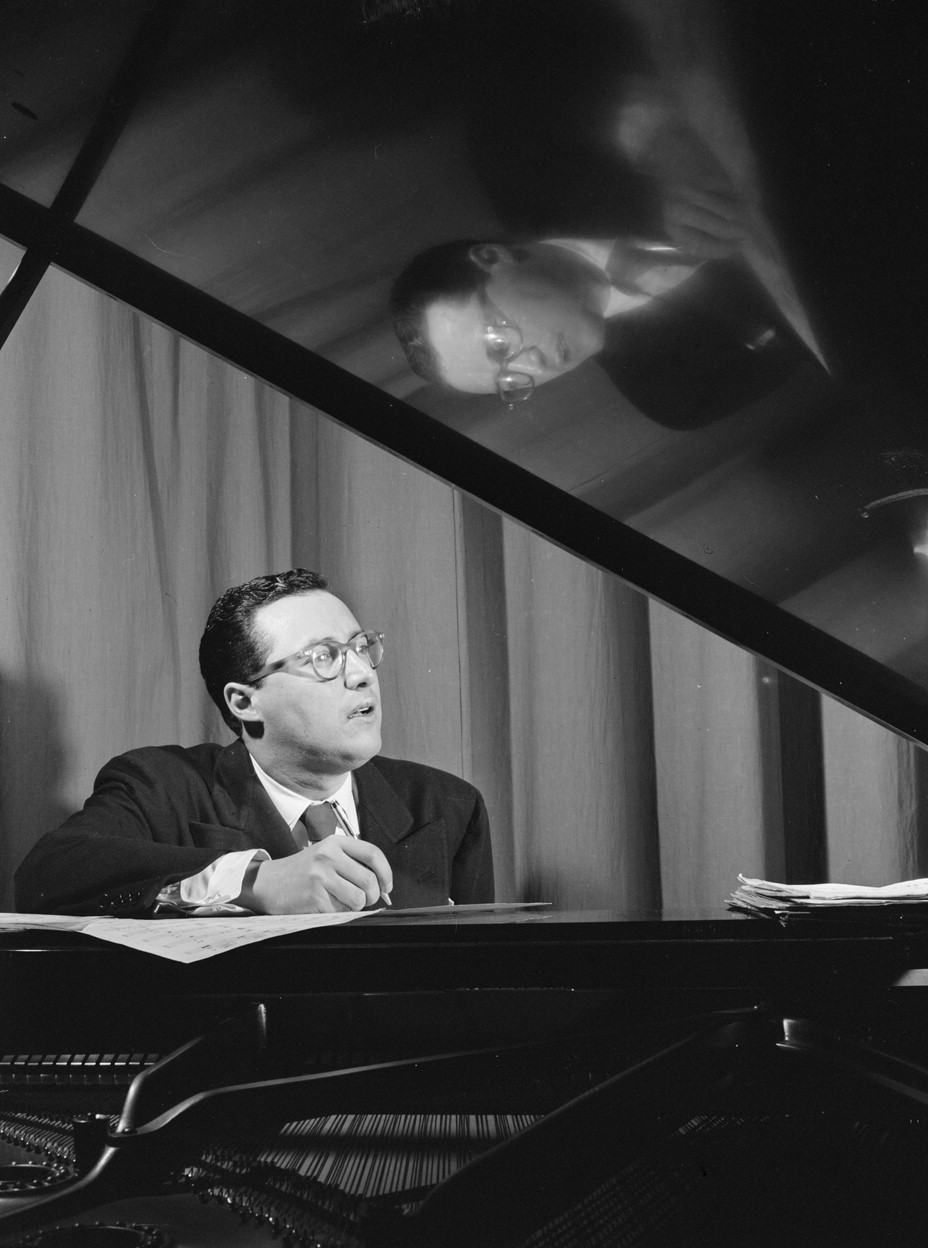
Pete Rugolo produced the sessions for Birth of the Cool.

The nonet recorded 12 tracks for Capitol during three sessions over nearly a year and a half. Davis, Lee Konitz, Gerry Mulligan, and Bill Barber were the only musicians who played on all three sessions, though the instrumental lineup was constant excepting the omission of piano and the addition of Kenny Hagood on March 9. The first session was on January 21, 1949, recording four tracks: Mulligan's "Jeru" and "Godchild"; Denzil Best's "Move"; and "Budo" by Davis and Bud Powell, (Note: The refrain is from Powell's composition Hallucinations; the bridge is by Davis.) the last two arranged by John Lewis. Jazz critic Richard Cook hypothesizes that Capitol, wanting to get a good start, recorded these numbers first because they were the catchiest tunes in the nonet's small repertoire. That date Kai Winding replaced Zwerin on trombone, Al Haig replaced Lewis on piano, and Joe Shulman replaced McKibbon on bass.

The second recording date was April 22, 1949, when Davis substituted for Fats Navarro in Tadd Dameron's band with Charlie Parker during the interim. The band returned to the studio with five changes in personnel: J. J. Johnson on trombone, Sandy Siegelstein on French horn, Nelson Boyd on bass, Kenny Clarke on drums, and Lewis on piano. At this session, the nonet recorded Mulligan's "Venus de Milo", Lewis's "Rouge", Carisi's "Israel", and "Boplicity", a collaboration between Davis and Evans, credited to the pseudonym "Cleo Henry".

The band did not return to the studio again until March 9, 1950. Davis did not call the band for any rehearsals or live performances between the second and third recording dates. This piano-less date featured Mulligan's arrangement of Eddie DeLange and Jimmy Van Heusen's "Darn That Dream", "Rocker", and "Deception", and Evans's arrangement of Chummy MacGregor's "Moon Dreams", which had been released in a jazz arrangement by Glenn Miller and the AAF Band in 1944 on V-Disc. The band saw more substitutions, with Gunther Schuller on French horn and Al McKibbon on bass. Hagood sang on "Darn That Dream."

== Composition ==
=== Music and style ===
One of the features of the Davis Nonet was the use of paired instrumentation. An example of this can be heard on the John Lewis arrangement "Move". In "Move", Lewis gives the melody to the pairing of trumpet and alto saxophone, baritone saxophone and tuba supply counterpoint, and trombone and French horn provide harmonies. Mulligan's "Jeru" demonstrates another Nonet hallmark: the use of a unison sound and rich harmony throughout the horns. Davis said, "I wanted the instruments to sound like human voices singing ... and they did." Though the album is seen as a departure from traditional bop, the recordings do feature tunes that are considered close to the bop style, such as "Budo", which has the band bookending solos by Davis, Mulligan, Konitz, and Winding, like a bebop head arrangement.

=== Thornhill's influence ===
One of the largest stated influences on the sound of Birth of the Cool was band leader Claude Thornhill and his orchestra. Out of Thornhill's band came Konitz, Barber, Junior Collins, Joe Shulman, Sandy Siegelstein, Mulligan, and Evans. Davis called the Konitz-Barber-Collins-Shulman-Siegelstein-Mulligan-Evans incarnation with Thornhill "the greatest band", second only to "the Billy Eckstine band with Bird". The Thornhill band was known for its impressionistic style, innovative use of instrumentation, such as the use of tuba and French horn, and a non-vibrato playing style, hallmarks that the Miles Davis Nonet adopted for Birth of the Cool. According to Evans:

Miles had liked some of what Gerry and I had written for Claude. The instrumentation for the Miles session was caused by the fact that this was the smallest number of instruments that could get the sound and still express all the harmonies the Thornhill band used. Miles wanted to play his idiom with that kind of sound.

Davis saw the full 18-piece Thornhill orchestra as cumbersome and thus decided to split the group in half for his desired sound. As arrangers, both Evans and Mulligan gave Thornhill credit for crafting their sound. Thornhill's band gave Evans the opportunity to try arranging small-group bebop tunes for big band, a practice few others were engaging in. Mulligan recalls Thornhill teaching him "the greatest lesson in dynamics, the art of underblowing". Thornhill has also been credited with launching the move away from call and response between sections and toward unison harmonies.

== Release history ==
Classics in Jazz: Miles Davis

Compilation album by Miles Davis
- Released: 1954
- Label: Capitol

Miles Davis 10" LP chronology
Miles Davis All Star Sextet (1954)	Classics in Jazz: Miles Davis (1954)	Miles Davis Quintet (1954)

The four tracks from the January 1949 session were released soon after recording as two 78 singles in 1949. From the April 1949 date, "Israel" and "Boplicity" were doubled together on a 78 and released in 1949 as well. "Venus de Milo" from the April 1949 session and "Darn That Dream" from the March 1950 session were then released as a 78 in 1950. In 1954, after persuasion from Rugolo, Capitol released eight of the tracks on a 10" LP record titled Classics in Jazz—Miles Davis, Capitol H-459. In 1957 eleven of the tracks (all except for "Darn That Dream") were released by Capitol as Birth of the Cool. The final and only track with a vocal, "Darn That Dream," was included with the other eleven on the 1972 LP Capitol Jazz Classics, Vol. 1: The Complete Birth Of The Cool, catalogue M-11026. Subsequent releases have used this 1972 compilation as the template. The album has since been reissued many times in various formats, on compact disc in 1989, a further expanded edition in 1998, and again as a Rudy Van Gelder remaster in 2001. The live recordings of the nonet from its time at the Royal Roost in September of 1948 were released as Cool Boppin in 1991. In 1998, Capitol Records released The Complete Birth of the Cool, which was remastered by Mark Levinson and collected the nonet's live Royal Roost and studio tracks onto a single disc.

Note from the 2001 Capitol reissue producer Michael Cuscuna:

All previous reissues of this material have been derived from the 1957 12-inch LP master, which turns out to be second or third generation. The original tapes of each tune were filed individually and sound considerably better. Rudy Van Gelder returned to these masters, transferred them in 24-bit to digital and worked his sonic magic. The result is a clearer and more present sound than ever before on these classic recordings.

== Reception and legacy ==
Retrospective professional reviews
Review scores
Source	Rating
AllMusic	5/5 stars
The Encyclopedia of Popular Music	5/5 stars
The Great Rock Discography	9/10
MusicHound Jazz	5/5 stars
The Penguin Guide to Jazz	4/4 stars
Pitchfork	10/10
Q	4/5 stars
The Rolling Stone Album Guide	5/5 stars

The band's debut performance at the Royal Roost received positive but reserved reactions. Count Basie, the Roost's headliner during the Nonet's brief tenure, was more open to the group's sound, saying, "Those slow things sounded strange and good. I didn't always know what they were doing, but I listened, and I liked it." Winthrop Sargeant, classical music critic at The New Yorker, compared the band's sound to the work of an "impressionist composer with a great sense of aural poetry and a very fastidious feeling for tone color... The music sounds more like that of a new Maurice Ravel than it does like jazz ... it is not really jazz." Though he did not recognize the record as jazz, Sargeant said he found the record "charming and exciting".

In the short term the reaction to the band was little to none, but in the long term the recordings' effects have been great and lasting. They have been credited with starting the cool jazz movement as well as creating a new and viable alternative to bebop.

In 1957, after the release of Birth of the Cool, Down Beat magazine wrote that the album influenced "deeply one important direction of modern chamber jazz". Several tunes from the album, such as Carisi's "Israel", have become jazz standards. The album was included in the book 1001 Albums You Must Hear Before You Die. Birth of the Cool was voted number 349 in Colin Larkin's All Time Top 1000 Albums (third edition, 2000).

Many members of the Miles Davis Nonet had successful careers in cool jazz, notably Mulligan, Lewis, and Konitz. Mulligan moved to California and joined forces with trumpeter Chet Baker in a piano-less quartet before creating his Concert Jazz Band. Lewis became music director of the Modern Jazz Quartet, which became one of the most influential cool jazz groups. Konitz had a long career, including work with Lennie Tristano and Warne Marsh in the 1950s. Evans collaborated with Davis again on a celebrated series of albums: Miles Ahead, Porgy and Bess, Sketches of Spain, and Quiet Nights. At the time, Capitol Records was disappointed with the sales of the nonet recordings, and did not offer Davis a contract extension. Instead, Davis signed with the new jazz specialty record label Prestige, for which he recorded his first album in 1951.

== Track listing ==
Arrangers listed in parentheses after the title: John Carisi; Gil Evans; John Lewis; or Gerry Mulligan. Original 1957 issue included eleven tracks as below; "Darn That Dream" included as twelfth track on 1972 and subsequent reissues. According to one academic source, the track "Budo" was arranged by Mulligan.

Side one
No.	Title	Writer(s)	Matrix number and recording date	Length
1.	"Move" (Lewis)	Denzil Best	3396 January 21, 1949	2:29
2.	"Jeru" (Mulligan)	Gerry Mulligan	3395 January 21, 1949	3:10
3.	"Moon Dreams" (Evans)	Chummy MacGregor, Johnny Mercer	4348 March 9, 1950	3:13
4.	"Venus De Milo" (Mulligan)	Gerry Mulligan	3764 April 22, 1949	3:10
5.	"Budo" (Lewis)	Miles Davis, Bud Powell	3398 January 21, 1949	2:31
6.	"Deception" (Mulligan)	George Shearing, Miles Davis	4346 March 9, 1950	2:46

Side two
No.	Title	Writer(s)	Matrix number and recording date	Length
1.	"Godchild" (Mulligan)	George Wallington	3397 January 21, 1949	3:08
2.	"Boplicity" (Evans)	Cleo Henry†	3766 April 22, 1949	2:58
3.	"Rocker" (Mulligan)	Gerry Mulligan	4347 March 9, 1950	3:04
4.	"Israel" (Carisi)	John Carisi	3767 April 22, 1949	2:15
5.	"Rouge" (Lewis)	John Lewis	3765 April 22, 1949	3:13
6.	"Darn That Dream" (Mulligan)	Eddie DeLange, Jimmy Van Heusen	4349 March 9, 1950	3:26

† Pseudonym for Miles Davis and Gil Evans.

1998 Complete reissue bonus tracks
No.	Title	Writer(s)	Recording date	Length
13.	"Birth of the Cool Theme"	Gil Evans	September 4, 1948	0:19
14.	"Symphony Sid announces the band"		September 4, 1948	1:02
15.	"Move" (Lewis)	Denzil Best	September 4, 1948	3:40
16.	"Why Do I Love You?" (Lewis)	Oscar Hammerstein II, Jerome Kern	September 4, 1948	3:41
17.	"Godchild" (Mulligan)	George Wallington	September 4, 1948	5:51
18.	"Symphony Sid introduction"		September 4, 1948	0:27
19.	"S'il vous plaît"	John Lewis	September 4, 1948	4:22
20.	"Moon Dreams" (Evans)	Chummy MacGregor, Johnny Mercer	September 4, 1948	3:05
21.	"Budo" (Lewis)	Miles Davis, Bud Powell	September 4, 1948	3:23
22.	"Darn That Dream" (Mulligan)	Eddie DeLange, Jimmy Van Heusen	September 18, 1948	4:25
23.	"Move" (Lewis)	Denzil Best	September 18, 1948	4:48
24.	"Moon Dreams" (Evans)	Chummy MacGregor, Johnny Mercer	September 18, 1948	3:46
25.	"Budo" (Lewis)	Miles Davis, Bud Powell	September 18, 1948	4:23

== Personnel ==
- Miles Davis – trumpet
- J. J. Johnson – trombone (all tracks except as below)
- Kai Winding – trombone ("Move", "Jeru", "Budo", and "Godchild")
- Mike Zwerin – trombone (Royal Roost recordings)
- Junior Collins – French horn ("Move", "Jeru", "Budo", "Godchild", and Royal Roost recordings)
- Sandy Siegelstein – French horn ("Venus de Milo", "Boplicity", "Israel", and "Rouge")
- Gunther Schuller – French horn ("Moon Dreams", "Deception", "Rocker", and "Darn That Dream")
- Bill Barber – tuba
- Lee Konitz – alto saxophone
- Gerry Mulligan – baritone saxophone
- Al Haig – piano ("Move", "Jeru", "Budo", and "Godchild")
- John Lewis – piano ("Venus de Milo", "Boplicity", "Israel", "Rouge", and Royal Roost recordings)
- Joe Shulman – bass ("Move", "Jeru", "Budo", and "Godchild")
- Nelson Boyd – bass ("Venus de Milo", "Boplicity", "Israel", and "Rouge")
- Al McKibbon – bass ("Moon Dreams", "Deception", "Rocker", "Darn That Dream", and Royal Roost recordings)
- Max Roach – drums (all tracks except as below)
- Kenny Clarke – drums ("Venus de Milo", "Boplicity", "Israel", and "Rouge")
- Kenny Hagood – vocals ("Darn That Dream" and "Why Do I Love You?")

== Charts ==
=== Weekly charts ===
Chart performance for Birth of the Cool
Chart (1995–2026)	Peak position
Croatian International Albums (HDU)	40
Scottish Albums (Official Charts)	86
UK Jazz & Blues Albums (Official Charts)	3
US Top Jazz Albums (Billboard)	10
US Top Traditional Jazz Albums (Billboard)	8

=== Monthly charts ===
Monthly chart performance for Birth of the Cool
Chart (2026)	Peak position
German Jazz Albums (Offizielle Top 100)	4

== Certifications and sales ==
Region	Certification	Certified units/sales
United Kingdom (BPI) sales since 2001	Silver	60,000^{^}
United States	—	280,000
^{^} Shipments figures based on certification alone.
