= Mike Zwerin =

American jazz musician (1930–2010)

- Born: May 18, 1930; Queens, New York City, New York, U.S.
- Died: April 2, 2010 (aged 79) Paris, France
- Genre: Jazz
- Occupation: Musician
- Instruments: Vocals, trombone, bass trumpet
- Website: mikezwerin.com

Mike Zwerin (May 18, 1930 – April 2, 2010) was an American cool jazz musician and author. Zwerin as a musician played the trombone and bass trumpet within various jazz ensembles. He was active within the jazz and progressive jazz musical community as a session musician. Zwerin found a way to pursue both his interests as an author living in New York, where he was born, and his passion for music by taking positions as a broadcaster, and other journalistic and media positions while maintaining his musical career as well. Although he gained notoriety for his writing, he may be best known to the public for his work with Miles Davis in 1948 as part of his Birth of the Cool band. Additionally, Zwerin also worked with Maynard Ferguson, Claude Thornhill, Archie Shepp and Bill Russo, among many others.

After a period as jazz critic of New York's Village Voice (1964–69), he was the publication's European editor (1969–71). Zwerin was also the Paris-based jazz critic for the International Herald Tribune for 21 years, then later for Bloomberg News.

Mike Zwerin died at the age of 79 in Paris on April 2, 2010.

== Life and career ==
=== Early life ===
Michael Zwerin was born into an affluent family in Queens, New York City, United States, where his father was president of the Capitol Steel Corporation. Zwerin studied at the High School of Music and Art, and began leading bands in his teens, in which he employed several up-and-coming musicians.

At the age of 18, while on his summer holidays from the University of Miami, Mike Zwerin was the trombonist in Miles Davis's nonet at the Royal Roost club in New York This band was famously to record its music the following year in the album that became immortalized as Birth of the Cool, but by then Zwerin had graduated and gone into his father's steel business.

He abandoned his musical life for much of the 1950s but after a spell in France he returned to New York in 1958 and played the trombone in several big bands.

=== Steel business ===
His father's death in 1960 threw Zwerin back into the world of business and he took over the presidency of the company. He combined this with jazz, and worked in John Lewis's big band Orchestra USA, with whom he recorded and directed a small group. He later worked briefly with the pianist Earl Hines. In the mid-1960s he gradually withdrew from business.

In his autobiography, Close Enough for Jazz (1983), he lampooned this period of his life, which lasted four years (1960–64), by turning the usual biographical note on its head: "In his spare time, Mike Zwerin is president of Dome Steel Corporation."

=== Musical career ===
Zwerin was spotted by Miles Davis at Minton's in Harlem, while sitting in with Art Blakey. The great man's approach is sometimes stated as "I like your sound", but Mike's hipper version was: "You keep pretty good time ... for a white cat". He was immediately drafted into the rehearsal band for what become known as Birth of the Cool, while the regular trombonist Kai Winding was indisposed. Also present were Gerry Mulligan, Max Roach and Lee Konitz. Zwerin's contribution, in particular his solo on the track "Move", can be heard on The Complete Birth of the Cool. As his obituary in the Times put it, "A few muddy recordings exist of radio broadcasts by the band during Zwerin's time in it, which gave him a lifelong reputation as a jazz musician lucky enough to have been at the cutting edge of a new movement."

Among his other recordings are Getting Xperimental over U, and Mack the Knife, an album of Kurt Weill songs that he produced and arranged himself. He also appears on Archie Shepp's 1968 album The Magic of Ju-Ju.

Zwerin moved to London in 1969 and then, in 1972, to Paris, which would be his home for the rest of his life. Nevertheless, he kept his hand in as a trombonist throughout the 1980s, working with his fellow expatriate Hal Singer and with the guitarist Christian Escoudé. In 1988, he toured with the Big Band Charles Mingus, having played briefly with the Swiss bandleader George Gruntz. He also played with the French fusion band Telephone.

=== Writing ===
Zwerin always mixed writing with playing. Before moving permanently to Paris in 1969, he was jazz critic for the Village Voice and focusing on journalism, writing for Down Beat, Rolling Stone and Penthouse before joining the International Herald Tribune. Along with fellow journalists Tim Page and Yvonne Chabrier, Zwerin was arrested in New Haven, Connecticut, on December 9, 1967, at a Doors concert where Jim Morrison was arrested onstage. Zwerin was charged with disturbing the peace, but charges against Zwerin and the other journalists were later dropped due to lack of evidence.

Zwerin also wrote several books about his own life in the world of jazz, most notably Close Enough for Jazz and The Parisian Jazz Chronicles: An Improvisational Memoir. The most ambitious of his books may be La Tristesse de Saint Louis: Swing Under the Nazis (1985). It included the story of the Kille Dillers and the Ghetto Swingers, two bands that played in concentration camps. He also translated the jazz writings of Boris Vian (Round About Close to Midnight, 1988), who was, like Zwerin, both writer and musician.

In his 1969 book, The Silent Sound of Needles, Zwerin wrote about his struggles with drug addiction. Using drugs was "part of the ethic of what I thought was being hip, which was really stupid," he said in a 2005 interview with Bloomberg News. "When you're that age, you're immortal."

Disappointment with the reception of his books led him to stick to journalism. He spent two years researching La Tristesse de Saint Louis: Swing Under the Nazis (1985). He traveled across France, Austria, Poland, and Germany to interview survivors and analyze how jazz was banned by the Nazi government as "degenerate music" Zwerin issued an expanded version of La Tristesse de Saint Louis as Swing Under the Nazis in 2000.

== Discography ==
=== As leader ===
- Not Much Noise (Spotlite, 1979)

=== As sideman ===
- Tony Allen, Afrobeat Express (Cobalt, 1989)
- Miles Davis, Pre-Birth of the Cool (Durium, 1974)
- Miles Davis, The Complete Birth of the Cool (Capitol, 1998)
- Maynard Ferguson, Newport Suite (Columbia, 1960)
- George Gruntz, For Flying Out Proud (MPS, 1978)
- George Gruntz, GG-CJB (MPS, 1979)
- Alexis Korner, The Party Album (Intercord, 1979)
- Alexis Korner, Alexis Korner and Friends (Amiga, 1981)
- John Lewis, Essence (Atlantic, 1962)
- Charles Mingus, Live at the Theatre Boulogne-Billancourt Paris Vol. 1 (Soul Note, 1989)
- Charles Mingus, Live at the Theatre Boulogne-Billancourt Paris Vol. 2 (Soul Note, 1993)
- Michel Petrucciani, Flash (Bingow, 1980)
- Bill Russo, Seven Deadly Sins (Roulette, 1960)
- Archie Shepp, The Magic of Ju-Ju (Impulse!, 1967)
- Alan Silva, The Shout: Portrait for a Small Woman (Sun, 1979)
- Alan Silva, Desert Mirage (I.A.C.P ,1982)
- Sugar Blue, Cross Roads (Blue Sound, 1979)
- Sugar Blue, From Paris to Chicago (EPM Musique, 1988)
