= Zwerin =

Zwerin is a surname. Notable people with the surname include:

- Charlotte Zwerin (1931–2004), American film director and editor
- Mike Zwerin (1930–2010), American jazz musician and writer
