= Bonnie Wetzel =

American jazz musician

Bonnie Jean Addleman, later Bonnie Wetzel (May 15, 1926, Vancouver, Washington - February 12, 1965) was an American jazz double-bassist.

Wetzel learned violin as a child, and was an autodidact on bass. She played with Ada Leonard in an all-female ensemble, and soon after worked in a trio with Marian Grange. She married trumpeter Ray Wetzel in 1949, and the pair worked in the Tommy Dorsey Orchestra in 1951.

She played in Beryl Booker's trio with Elaine Leighton in 1953; this ensemble toured Europe in 1953–54, and recorded for Discovery Records. She also played with Herb Ellis, Charlie Shavers, Roy Eldridge, and Don Byas. Later in the 1950s she freelanced in New York City.

She died on February 12, 1965, at the age of 38.
