= Joe Shulman =

American jazz bassist (1923–1957)

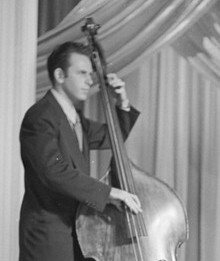
- Shulman in Claude Thornhill's Orchestra, 1947

Background information
- Born: September 12, 1923; New York City, New York, U.S.
- Died: August 2, 1957 (aged 33) New York City, New York, U.S.
- Genres: Swing, jazz
- Occupation: Musician
- Instrument: Bass

Joseph Shulman (September 12, 1923 – August 2, 1957) was an American jazz bassist.

Shulman's first professional experience was with Scat Davis in 1940, which he followed with a stint alongside Les Brown in 1942. He joined the military in 1943, and recorded with Django Reinhardt while a member of Glenn Miller's wartime band. Upon his return he played with Buddy Rich and Claude Thornhill; later he played with Miles Davis on the Birth of the Cool sessions. He worked with Peggy Lee from 1948 to 1950 and with Lester Young in 1950; he also did a recording session with Billy Strayhorn and Duke Ellington that year.

Shulman married Barbara Carroll in 1954, and the two toured together until Shulman's death from a heart attack in 1957.
