= Barbara Carroll =

American jazz pianist and vocalist (1925–2017)

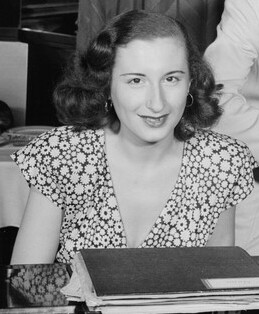
- Carroll with Clyde Lombardi and Chuck Wayne, 1947

Background information
- Born: Barbara Carole Coppersmith; January 25, 1925; Worcester, Massachusetts, U.S.
- Died: February 12, 2017 (aged 92) Manhattan, New York, U.S.
- Genres: Jazz
- Occupation: Musician
- Instruments: Piano, vocals
- Years active: 1947–2016
- Website: www.barbaracarrolljazz.com

Barbara Carroll (born Barbara Carole Coppersmith; January 25, 1925 – February 12, 2017) was an American jazz pianist and vocalist.

== Early life and career ==
Carroll was born in Worcester, Massachusetts. She began her classical training in piano at age eight, but by high school decided to become a jazz pianist. She attended the New England Conservatory of Music for a year, but left it as it conflicted with working for bands. In 1947 Leonard Feather dubbed her "the first girl ever to play bebop piano." In the following year her trio, which featured Chuck Wayne on guitar and Clyde Lombardi on bass, worked briefly with Benny Goodman. Later Charlie Byrd replaced Wayne and Joe Shulman replaced Lombardi. After Byrd's departure, Carroll decided to have it be a drums, bass, and piano trio.

In the 1950s, Carroll and her trio worked on Me and Juliet by Rodgers and Hammerstein. The decade saw her career ebb due to changing musical tastes and personal concerns.

== Later career ==
In 1972 she revived her career due to a renewed interest in her work. In 1975 she was asked by Rita Coolidge to work on a session for A&M. In 1978 she toured with Coolidge and Kris Kristofferson. In the following two decades she became known as a cabaret performer.

== Personal life ==
In September 1954, Carroll married jazz bassist Joe Shulman, a member of the trio. He died from a heart attack in 1957 at age 33. She subsequently married agent and photographer Bert Block, with whom she had a daughter. Block died of emphysema in 1986. In 2011, Carroll married advertising executive Mark Stroock, a union that lasted until her death at 92.

== Awards and honors ==
In 2003, Carroll was awarded the Kennedy Center's Mary Lou Williams Women in Jazz Lifetime Achievement Award.

Carroll was honored as The New Jewish Home's Eight Over Eighty Gala 2015 honoree.

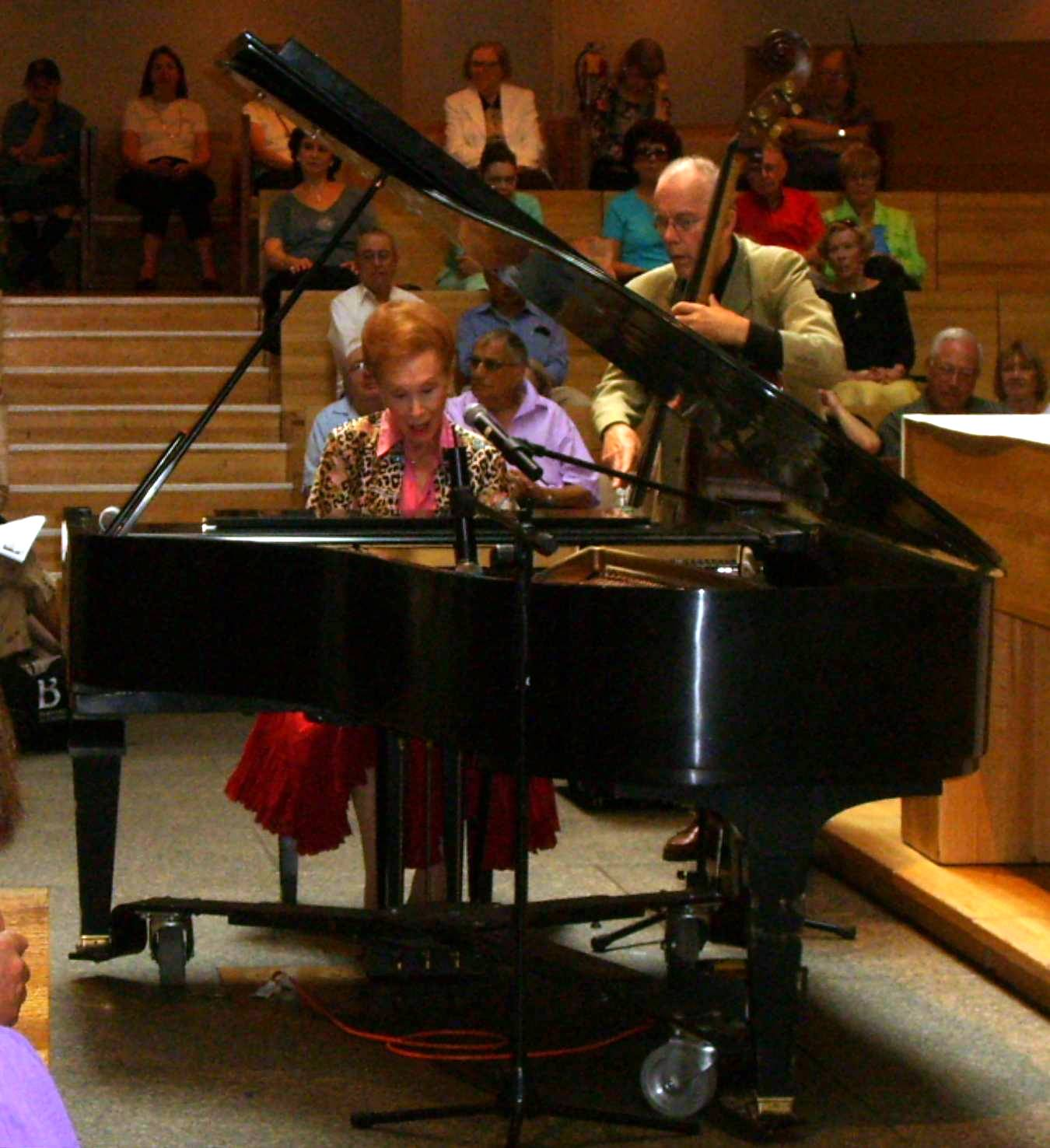
Carroll in New York, 2007

== Discography ==
Year	Title	Label	Notes
1952	Barbara Carroll	Atlantic LP-132, Piano Panorama Series Vol. III	10" LP; reissued 1957 as Ladies of Jazz with Mary Lou Williams 10"
1953	Barbara Carroll Trio	RCA Victor LJM-1001, Livingston Binaural 1081-BN (1996)	Trio, with Joe Shulman (bass), Herb Wasserman (drums)
1955	Lullabies in Rhythm	RCA Victor LJM-1023	With Joe Shulman (bass), Ralph Pollack (drums)
1956	Have You Met Miss Carroll?	RCA Victor LPM-1137	Trio, with Joe Shulman (bass), Ralph Pollack (drums)
1956	We Couldn't Just Say Goodbye	RCA Victor LPM-1296	Trio, with Joe Shulman (bass), Joe Petti (drums)
1957	It's a Wonderful World	RCA Victor LPM-1396	Trio, with Joe Shulman (bass), Albert Monroe (drums)
1957	Lookin' For A Boy	Savoy MG 12097	Joint release with Marianne McPartland Trio, Adelaide Robbins Trio
1957	Funny Face	Verve MGV-2063	Trio, with Joe Shulman (bass), Joe Petti (drums) Also known as Plays The Best of George and Ira Gershwin
1958	Barbara	Verve MG V-2095	With Joe Shulman (bass), Bill Faite (drums)
1958	Flower Drum Song	Kapp K-1113	Orchestra directed by Bill Byers
1959	Satin Doll	Kapp K-1193	Orchestra directed by Jack Elliot
1964	Fresh From Broadway! The Hit Tunes Of "Hello, Dolly!" & "What Makes Sammy Run?"	Warner Bros. W1543	Orchestra directed by Glenn Osser
1967	Live! Her Piano And Trio	Warner Bros. WS 1710	With Beverly Peer (bass), Dick Sheridan (drums)
1976	Barbara Carroll	Blue Note BN-LA645-G	With Chuck Domanico (bass), Colin Bailey (drums)
1977	From the Beginning	United Artists Records UAG 30168	With Hugh McCracken (guitar), Steve Gadd (drums) and strings conducted by Gene Orloff
1979	The Barbara Carroll Trio (also released as Why Not?)	Jazz Vault JV-114 (SESAC N-3201/02)	With Alan Mack (bass), Joe Boppo (drums), recorded 1959
1981	At the Piano	Discovery DS-847	Solo
1991	Live at the Carlyle	DRG 91407	With Claudio Roditi (trumpet & flugelhorn), Jay Leonhart (bass), Akira Tana (drums)
1994	This Heart of Mine	DRG 91416	With Jerome Richardson (tenor sax, alto sax), Art Farmer (trumpet), Jay Leonhart and Frank Tate (bass; separately), Joe Cocuzzo (drums)
1994	Old Friends	Audiophile Records ACD-254	With Phil Bodner (reeds), Jay Leonhart (bass), Grady Tate (drums)
1995	Everything I Love	DRG 91438	With Randy Sandke (trumpet), Bucky Pizzarelli (guitar), Jay Berliner (guitar acoustic), Jay Leonhart (bass), Joe Cocuzzo (drums), James Saporito (percussion)
1996	All In Fun	After 9 TWCD-2007	
2001	One Morning in May	After 9 302 062143.2	
2004	Live at Birdland	Harbinger HCD-2301	With Jay Leonhart (bass), Joe Cocuzzo (drums)
2005	Sentimental Mood	Venus TKJV-19163	With Jay Leonhart (bass), Joe Coccuzzo (drums)
2006	I Wished On the Moon	Venus TKCV-36398	With Jay Leonhart (bass), Joe Coccuzzo (drums)
2010	Something to Live For	Harbinger HCD-2601	Trio with Jay Leonhart (bass), Alvin Atkinson (drums) plus Ken Peplowski (tenor sax, clarinet); recorded live in concert
2010	How Long Has This Been Going On? Live at Dizzy's Club Coca-Cola	Harbinger HCD-2701	Trio with Jay Leonhart (bass), Alvin Atkinson (drums) plus Ken Peplowski (tenor sax, clarinet); recorded live in concert
2016?	Barbara Carroll Plays at Birdland	Birdland	With Jay Leonhart (bass); in concert

== See also ==
- Karrin Allyson
- Tania Maria
- Emily Elbert
- Julia Feldman
- Sitti Navarro
