= Beryl Booker =

American swing pianist

Background information
- Born: June 7, 1922; Philadelphia, Pennsylvania, U.S.
- Died: September 30, 1978 (aged 56) Berkeley, California, U.S.
- Genres: Swing; Post bop Cool jazz
- Occupation: Musician
- Instrument: Piano
- Formerly of: Slam Stewart

Beryl Booker (June 7, 1922 – September 30, 1978) was an American swing pianist. She was born in Philadelphia.

== Career ==
Booker performed with Slam Stewart's trio in 1946, and played intermittently with him until 1951. She was Dinah Washington accompanist for a period. In 1951, she became part of the newly formed Austin Powell Quintet (consisting of former Cats and the Fiddle members Doris Knighton, Johnny Davis and Stanley Gaines, and also Dottie Smith) which recorded one Decca single entitled "All This Can't Be True" before disbanding.

=== Beginning her own combo ===
In early 1952, Booker led a quintet which played Birdland, featuring Don Elliot, Chuck Wayne, Clyde Lombardi and Connie Kay. Recordings with Miles Davis sitting in on the group have been preserved. In 1953, she formed her own trio with Bonnie Wetzel and Elaine Leighton (de) (nl) (1926–1912). This group toured Europe in 1954 as part of a show entitled "Jazz Club USA", which featured Billie Holiday. After another stint with Dinah Washington in 1959, she slipped into obscurity.

=== Later career ===
In the 1970s, she continued to perform and record with small groups. Philadelphia writer Thom Nickels, who knew Booker in the 1970s, nominated her several times for Philadelphia's Walk of Fame on Broad Street. The project to get Booker on the Walk of Fame remains in progress.

After suffering a stroke, Booker died in Berkeley, California, in September 1978, at the age of 56.

== Discography ==
- A Girl Met a Piano (EmArcy, 1952)
- (With Teddi King) 'Round Midnight (Storyville, 1953)
- Beryl Booker Trio (Discovery, 1954)
- Don Byas with Beryl Booker (Discovery, 1954)
- The Beryl Booker Trio (Cadence, 1954)
