= Black performance of Jewish music =

Jewish music played by Black artists

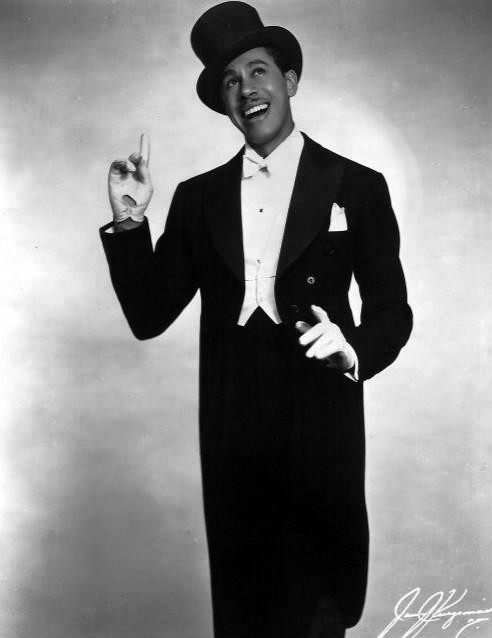

Black performance of Jewish music has a long, studied history of Black and Jewish musicians, songwriters, and performers influencing each other through their unique cultures that helped provide both groups with inspiration. Along with this collaboration, there is also the element of Jewish songs having a direct impact on Black musicians. Throughout musical history there are many iconic moments where Black artists performed Jewish music, including notable figures such as Paul Robeson, Cab Calloway, and Aretha Franklin. Many of these Black artists claim to feel a connection to the Jewish songs and people from their shared desire for freedom and sadness from leaving their ancestral lands.

== "Eli Eli" ==
"Eli, Eli," a song based on King David's lament in Psalm 22, became a popular song sung by Jewish and black singers alike, including Paul Robeson. Paul Robeson was a famous black performer, actor, and civil rights activist known for his diverse singing style and his civil rights work. Robeson also famously performed, what he called a "Hassidic Chant", which was a version of the Jewish prayer, the Kaddish amended by the Levi Yitzhak of Berdichev, at Carnegie Hall. Robeson not only performed the chant, but connected it to his African and family roots, saying that it was a personal song that linked him to his late father, since the Kaddish is said when mourning a parent, who had been born a slave and was a preacher.

"Eli Eli" was also famously covered by artists, such as Duke Ellington, and Ethel Waters, who said "that history of their age-old grief and despair is so similar to that of my own people that I felt I was telling the story of my own race too.”

The song discussed here should not be confused with the traditional Jewish hymn of the same name recorded by Belle Baker in 1919 (see https://www.loc.gov/resource/ihas.200196253.0?st=gallery) and included in the 1931 show "Rhapsody in Black (see https://www.ibdb.com/broadway-production/rhapsody-in-black-11364 )

== Cab Calloway ==
Cab Calloway was a famous black American Jazz singer who drew heavy influences from Jewish music, even going so far to be considered an "Afro-Yiddishist." Calloway's friendship with his Jewish manager, Irving Mills was Calloway's main gateway into the world of Jewish music and songs. Calloway also said he learned about Jewish music when he was a kid and would go to hear the cantors sing in synagogues, which he claims directly influences his notable "''Hi-De-Ho' style," exemplified in his hit song and later famous animation, "Minnie the Moocher." Calloway directly paid homage to the Yiddish culture introduced to him by Irving Berlin in his song "Utt De Zay (The Tailor's Song)" based on a real Yiddish song of the same name.

== Fiddler on the Roof ==
Cannonball Adderley was an American jazz saxophonist who played with legends like Miles Davis. In 1964, he released Cannonball Adderley's Fiddler on the Roof, a saxophone version of the famous Fiddler on the Roof musical soundtrack. The broadway play was a resounding success, and Cannonball Adderley's rendition helped further connect the Black and Jewish music experience. Although it is a Jazz rendition, Addereley still maintains the Klezmer style on the song "Tradition," in order to respect the Jewish heritage of the song. The Temptations also famously recorded a medley of songs from Fiddler on the Roof, including "Sunrise, sunset," "If I Were a Rich Man," and "Matchmaker, matchmaker."

== Bei Mir Bist Du Schön ==
Bei Mir Bist Du Schön was composed by Sholom Secunda for a 1932 Yiddish musical. In 1937, lyricist Sammy Cahn and pianist Lou Levy were at the Apollo Theater when two Black performers, Johnnie and George, started singing it in Yiddish. The crowd went wild and Cahn convinced his employer Warner Music to purchase the rights for the song. The song became a worldwide hit when The Andrews Sisters covered it later that year.

== Harry Burleigh ==
Harry Burleigh was a Black classical composer, having created over 200 works in his lifetime. Burleigh's grandfather was a slave who had successfully purchased his freedom. As a young boy, he performed as a choir boy in local church events and even at a local Reform synagogue. In 1900, Burleigh was the first Black American chosen as a soloist as Temple Emanu-El.

== See also ==
- Jewish influence in rhythm and blues
- Jews in jazz
- Jewish women in Jazz
