= Jewish influence in rhythm and blues =

Aspect of African-American musical history

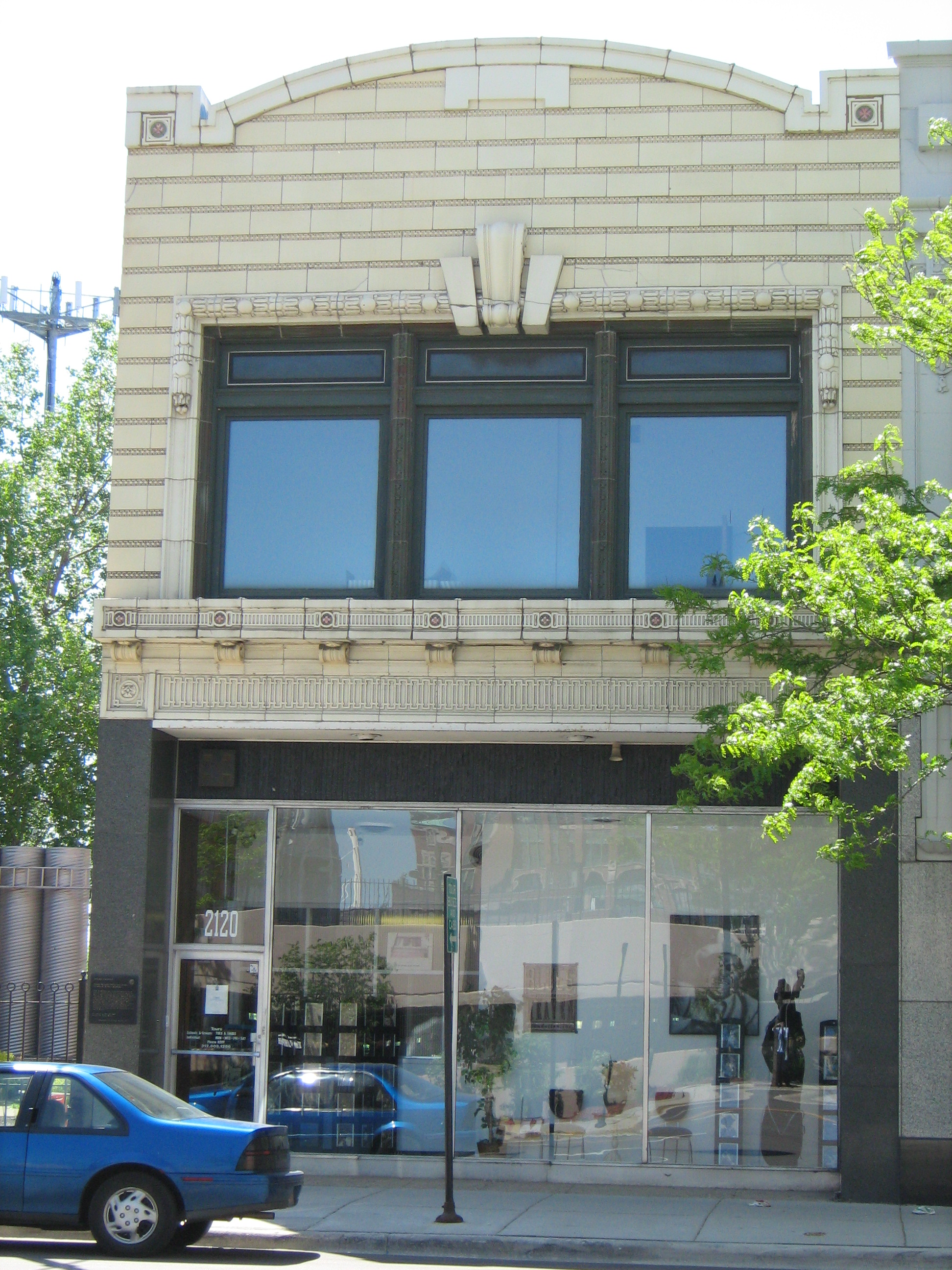
Studio of Chess Records in Chicago, founded in 1950 by Leonard and Phil Chess

Though the music itself developed in African-American communities, the Jewish influence in rhythm and blues, particularly in terms of the music's presentation to a wider audience, was important. According to the Jewish writer, music publishing executive, and songwriter Arnold Shaw, during the 1940s in the United States there was generally little opportunity for Jews in the WASP-controlled realm of mass communications, but the music business was "wide open for Jews as it was for blacks". Jews played a key role in developing and popularizing African American music, including rhythm and blues, and the independent record business was dominated by young Jewish men, and some women, who promoted the sounds of black music.

== Jewish-owned record companies and the promotion of African American music ==
Jewish composers, musicians, and promoters had a prominent role in the transition from jazz and swing to doo-wop and rock 'n' roll in American popular music of the 1950s, while Jewish businessmen founded many of the labels that recorded rhythm and blues during the height of the vocal group era. According to Israeli Jewish historian Ari Katorza, although only two percent of the total US population was Jewish, their representation in the music industry was much higher, and by this time they owned or managed about "forty percent of the independent record companies recording and distributing rock 'n' roll and rhythm and blues music in the United States."

In the decade from 1944 to 1955, many of the most influential record companies specializing in "race" music (or rhythm and blues, as it later came to be known) were owned or co-owned by Jews. These included Chess and National Records in Chicago; King in Cincinnati; Savoy in Newark; Apollo, Old Town, and Atlantic in New York; and Specialty, Aladdin, and Modern in Los Angeles, as well as many others; they were the small independent record companies that recorded, marketed, and distributed doo-wop music. Jack and Devora Brown, a Jewish couple in Detroit, founded Fortune Records in 1946, and recorded a variety of eccentric artists and sounds; in the mid-1950s they became champions of Detroit rhythm and blues, including the music of local doo-wop groups.

Jewish entrepreneurs started scores of independent record companies between 1940 and 1960; many of them focused on black popular music and promoting black talent with their new vocal group sound. Although black-owned independent labels competed with the Jewish-owned indie labels in the rhythm and blues era, Jewish entrepreneurs had access to a wide network in popular entertainment that made Jews preeminent in music publishing, talent agencies, A&R, and record distribution. This network wielded considerable influence in American culture and business.

Running an independent record label in the rhythm and blues and early rock 'n' roll era was practically a Jewish business niche. Prominent Jewish entrepreneurs included Herb Abramson of Atlantic, Jules Bihari of Modern, Al Green of National, Florence Greenberg of Apollo, Herman Lubinsky of Savoy, Syd Nathan of King, Art Rupe of Specialty, and Hy Weiss of Old Town.

== Jewish women in the business end of rhythm and blues ==
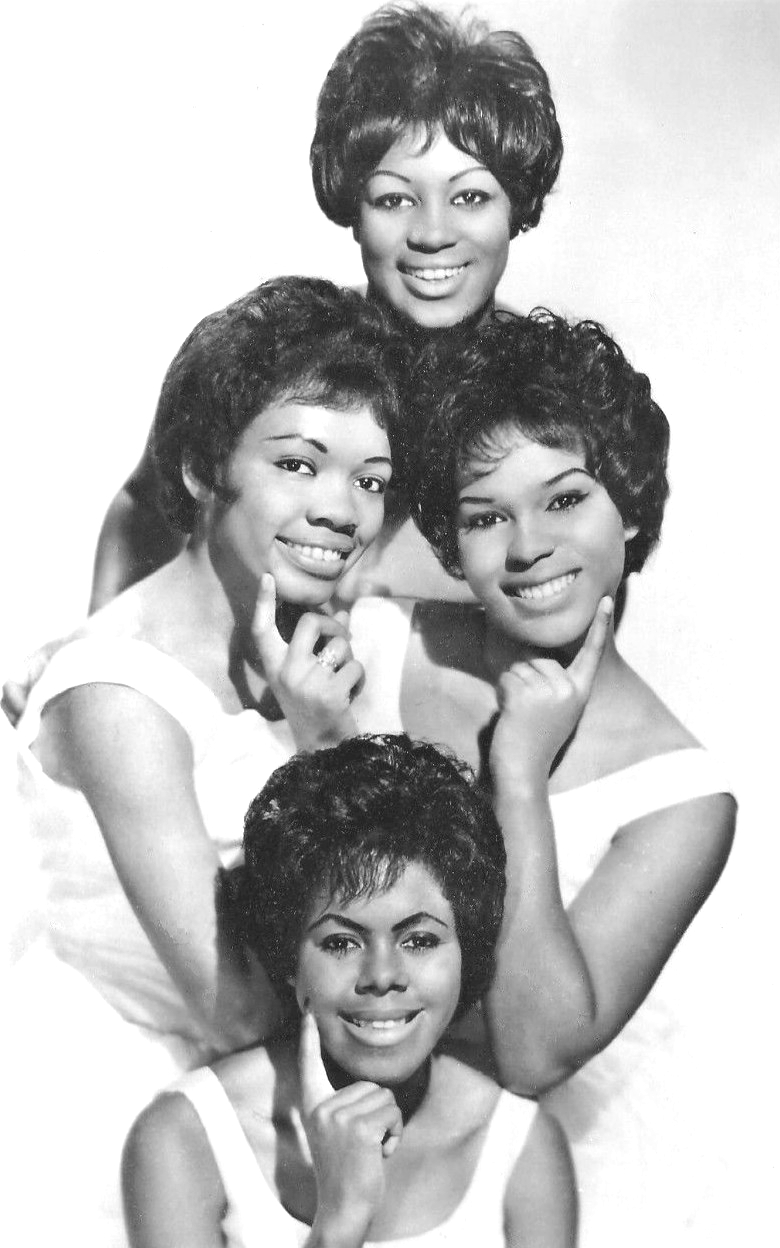
The Shirelles (1962)

Deborah Chessler, a young Jewish sales clerk interested in black music, attended shows at black and white performance venues in segregated Baltimore, where she absorbed the music that influenced her own songwriting. After the shows, she tried to sell her songs, which she described as in the "black vein", to the groups backstage. Chessler, who could not read or write music, would repeat melodies she composed in her mind until she could find a pianist to transcribe them. She wrote the lyrics to her song "It's Too Soon To Know" on toilet paper when she could find no other paper in her hotel room. With Chessler as their manager and songwriter, the Baltimore doo-wop group the Orioles recorded the song and it reached no. 1 on Billboard's race records charts in November 1948.

A few Jewish women were in the recording business, such as Florence Greenberg, who started the Scepter label in 1959, and signed the African American girl group, the Shirelles. The songwriting team of Gerry Goffin and Carole King, who worked for Don Kirshner's Aldon Music at 1650 Broadway (near the famed Brill Building at 1619); offered Greenberg a song, "Will You Love Me Tomorrow", which was recorded by the Shirelles and rose to number 1 on the Billboard Hot 100 chart in 1961. During the early 1960s, Scepter was the most successful independent record label.

== Business practice and relations with black artists ==
The prevailing narrative of the historical record has described the unfair treatment of black performers by the men who ran the postwar music industry; the most controversial among them were the Jewish owners of independent record companies that sprang up in the United States in the 1940s. Record company owners such as Herman Lubinsky had a reputation for exploiting black artists, and only a few Jewish owners were never accused of dealing unfairly with the black artists they recorded. The sometimes morally dubious business practices of men like Lubinsky and Syd Nathan caused Jewish label heads to be regarded as parasites on black culture by some groups and commentators.

Lubinsky, who founded Savoy Records in 1942, produced and recorded the Carnations, the Debutantes, The Falcons, the Jive Bombers, the Robins, and many others. Although his entrepreneurial approach to the music business and his role as a middleman between black artists and white audiences created opportunities for unrecorded groups to pursue wider exposure, his business partner Ozzie Cadena, a producer and A&R scout for Savoy Records, told an interviewer that Lubinsky hated blacks; Lubinsky in turn was reviled by many black musicians.

Historians Robert Cherry and Jennifer Griffith maintain that regardless of Lubinsky's personal shortcomings, the evidence that he treated African American artists worse in his business dealings than other independent label owners did is unconvincing. They contend that in the extremely competitive independent record company business during the postwar era, the practices of Jewish record owners generally were more a reflection of changing economic realities in the industry than of their personal attitudes.

Some Jewish company owners genuinely appreciated the music they recorded and were committed to the struggle for racial equality. Milt Gabler of Commodore Records has been frequently lauded for his taste in music, support of civil rights for African Americans, and fair business practices. Syd Nathan and Leonard Chess were successful Jewish businessmen who could recognize talent, and while focussed at first exclusively on profits, they were examples of record company owners who gradually developed an appreciation for the music and the artists. In 1949, the Cincinnati Post reported how Nathan's business policies subverted Jim Crow segregation, while Chess's part ownership of local black oriented radio station WVON helped foster good relations between the black and white communities in Chicago.

== Jews in the business with black identity ==
There were also Jews in the music business who considered themselves black culturally, but Jewish in their roles as entrepreneurs who managed black singing groups. Jewish creative people in the industry—artists, arrangers, producers, and songwriters—also sometimes preferred to mask their ethnic background and assume an African American cultural identity. According to Jerry Wexler, these men identified with black culture, spoke and carried themselves as if they were "black", and married black women. Jerry Leiber, who grew up in lower-class West Baltimore where his mother opened a grocery store in a black neighborhood, once commented, "I felt black. I was, as far as I was concerned."

== Brill Building songwriting ==
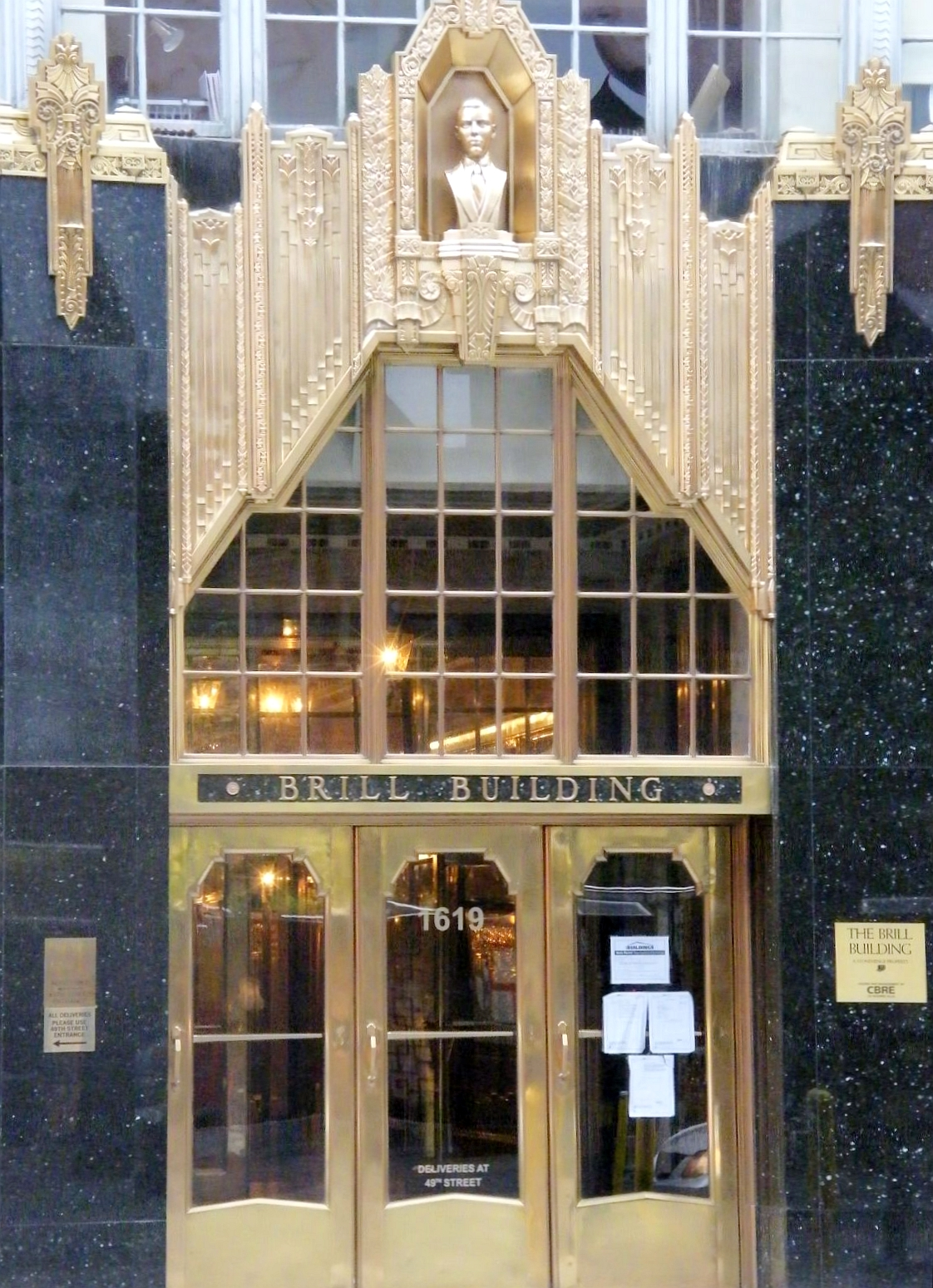
Brill Building at 1619 Broadway, Manhattan, New York

The American girl groups of the late 1950s and early 1960s had a sound directly influenced by the vocal harmonizing of the earlier black groups who sang doo-wop. Many of the doo-wop songs informing early rock 'n' roll music were written by the so-called "Brill Building" writers, most notably the songwriting team of Jerry Leiber and Mike Stoller, who wrote songs for the Robins, the Clovers, and then did the same for the Coasters. The "Brill Building" hit-maker businesses in New York that created the Brill Building sound were known for the strong Jewish and female presence in their stables of young songwriters. These songwriters contributed to a revitalization of doo-wop and pioneered the girl group stylings of the Shirelles, the Crystals, the Ronettes, and the Shangri-Las, all of whom had great Billboard chart success in the late 1950s and early 1960s.

The music conceived at the Brill Building was more sophisticated than other pop styles of the time, combining contemporary sounds with classic Tin Pan Alley songwriting. Ellie Greenwich, Carole King, and Cynthia Weil were among the most accomplished of the Brill Building songwriters who wrote R&B and doo-wop hits, and used doo-wop conventions to express the drama of teenage love and give voice to the romantic concerns of young female music fans.

== See also ==
- Jews in jazz
- Black performance of Jewish music
