= Clyde Lombardi =

American jazz double bassist (1922–after 1975)

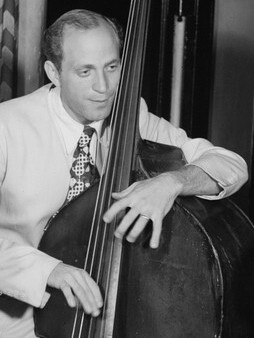
- Clyde Lombardi, ca. 1947

Background information
- Birth name: Claudio Lombardi
- Born: February 18, 1922; New York, U.S.
- Died: after 1975; New York, U.S.
- Genres: Jazz
- Occupation: Musician
- Instruments: Double bass

Claudio "Clyde" Lombardi (February 18, 1922 – after 1975) was an American jazz double bassist.

After receiving classical training, Lombardi first performed and recorded with Red Norvo (1942–5) in a band which also included with Aaron Sachs, Specs Powell, Shorty Rogers and Eddie Bert, and then on another recording with Joe Marsala (1945).

In 1945, he joined Benny Goodman's big bands and small groups. After working with Charlie Ventura (1946) and Boyd Raeburn (1947), he returned to Goodman in June 1948 until June 1949.

At around that time, Lombardi also recorded with Lennie Tristano's trio with Billy Bauer (1946–47), Wardell Gray, Stan Getz, and Al Haig (all 1948).

In the late 1940s, he also played in Barbara Carroll's trio with Chuck Wayne at New York's Downbeat Club.

After leaving Goodman's band, Lombardi appeared on television in September 1951 as a member of Red Norvo's trio (substituting Charles Mingus, the trio's regular double bass player, who did not yet have a local musicians’ union card).

In the 1950s, he recorded with Zoot Sims (1951), Mel Tormé (1951), with Eddie Bert's band (1952–3, 1955), featuring Sal Salvador, Harry Bliss and Frank Isola as well as with Tal Farlow and George Wallington.

Around this time (early 1950s) he also gave tuition to Bucky Calabrese.

== See also ==
- List of jazz bassists
