= Boplicity =

Composition by Miles Davis

from the album Birth of the Cool
- Released: February 1957
- Recorded: April 22, 1949
- Genre: Cool jazz
- Length: 3:02
- Label: Capitol
- Composer(s): Gil Evans; Miles Davis, aka Cleo Henry
- Producer(s): Pete Rugolo

Boplicity is a jazz composition which has become a standard. It was written by Miles Davis and Gil Evans for the 1957 album Birth of the Cool, but credited to "Cleo Henry", which was the maiden name of Davis' mother. It was composed in the key of F major.
