= Royal Roost =

Former jazz club

Coordinates: 40.7597°N 73.9848°W

The Royal Roost was a jazz club located at 1580 Broadway in the Theater District of Manhattan in New York City.

== History ==
Ralph Watkins originally opened the Royal Roost as a chicken restaurant. After a difficult start, Watkins was persuaded by Sid Torin (D.J. Symphony Sid) to try presenting modern jazz at the club. Beginning in 1948 the club began to showcase the likes of Charlie Parker, Dizzy Gillespie, Fats Navarro, Dexter Gordon, Tadd Dameron, and Max Roach. The presence of so many prominent bebop musicians performing at the Royal Roost led to the club being nicknamed "the Metropolitan Bopera House," a pun referencing the club's close proximity to the nearby Metropolitan Opera House. In 1949, a record label, Roost Records, was founded by Arthur Faden, Bill Faden, Monty Kay and Ralph Watkins, which recorded many of the musicians who performed at the club. In September 1948, Miles Davis debuted his nonet at the club, a project that would eventually give rise to the seminal cool jazz album Birth of the Cool. By the early 1950s, the jazz component of the Roost was moved to Watkins's new club, Bop City.

The Roost was the site of bootleg recordings of both Ella Fitzgerald and her then-husband, Ray Brown.
