= Ballads & Blues (Miles Davis album) =

Compilation album by Miles Davis
- Released: March 19, 1996
- Recorded: March 9, 1950 – March 9, 1958
- Genres: Jazz music, cool jazz
- Length: 46:39
- Label: Blue Note
- Producer: Pete Rugolo

Miles Davis chronology
Highlights from the Plugged Nickel (1995)	Ballads & Blues (1996)	This Is Jazz, Vol. 8: Miles Davis Acoustic (1996)

Professional ratings
Review scores
Source	Rating
AllMusic	4/5 stars

Ballads & Blues is a compilation album by the American jazz musician Miles Davis. It was released on March 19, 1996, by Blue Note and recorded from March 9, 1950, to March 9, 1958.

== Track listing ==
1. "I Waited for You" (Fuller, Gillespie) – 3:30
2. "Yesterdays" (Arkeen, Harbach, James, Johnson, Kern, Rose) – 3:44
3. "One for Daddy-O" (Adderley, Adderley) – 8:25
4. "Moon Dreams" (MacGregor, Mercer) – 3:18
5. "How Deep Is the Ocean?" (Berlin) – 4:38
6. "Weirdo" (Davis) – 4:43
7. "Enigma" (Johnson) – 3:22
8. "It Never Entered My Mind" (Hart, Rodgers) – 4:01
9. "Autumn Leaves" (Kosma, Mercer, Prevert) – 10:58

== Personnel ==
- Cannonball Adderley – alto saxophone
- Nat Adderley, Jr. – composing
- West Arkeen – composing
- John Barber – tuba
- Art Blakey – drums
- Kenny Clarke – drums
- Gil Coggins – piano
- Miles Davis – trumpet
- Walter Fuller – composing
- Dizzy Gillespie – composing
- Doug Hawkins – engineering
- Jimmy Heath – tenor saxophone
- Percy Heath – double bass
- Del James – composing
- J.J. Johnson – composing, trombone
- Hank Jones – piano
- Sam Jones – bass
- Lee Konitz – alto saxophone
- Alfred Lion – producing
- Al McKibbon – bass
- Gerry Mulligan – baritone saxophone
- Oscar Pettiford – bass
- Max Roach – drums
- Pete Rugolo – producing
- Gunther Schuller – French horn
- Horace Silver – piano
- Rudy Van Gelder – engineering

== Charts ==
Chart	Peak chart position
US Billboard Top Jazz Albums	18
