= Symphony Sid =

American jazz DJ (1909–1984)

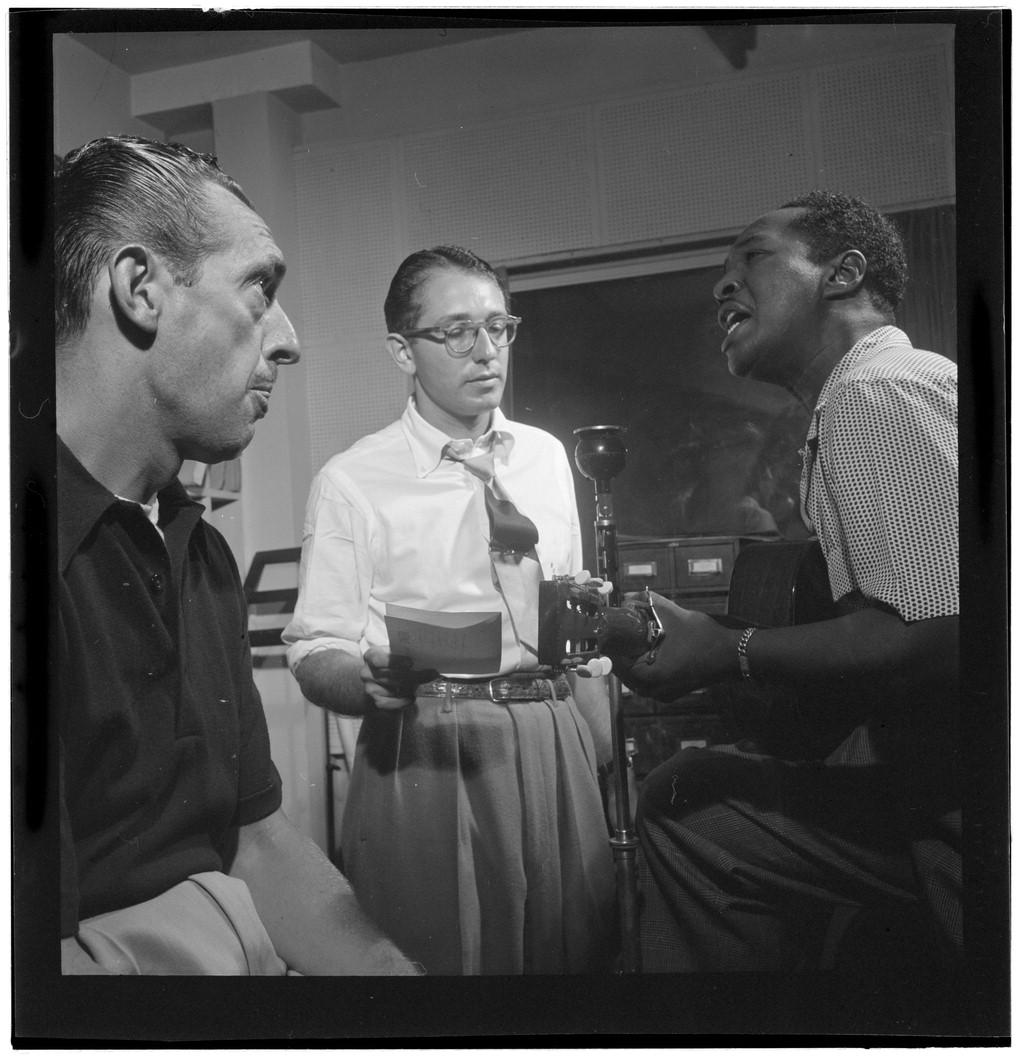
Symphony Sid (left) with Josh White (right), WHOM, New York, in the 1940s

Sid Torin (born Sidney Tarnopol; December 14, 1909 – September 14, 1984), known professionally as "Symphony Sid", was a long-time jazz disc jockey in the United States. Many critics have credited him with introducing bebop to a mass audience.

== Early life ==
Sidney Tarnopol was born in New York City into a Jewish family. According to the 1920 U.S. Census, his parents were Isidore (a printer) and Caroline, both Yiddish-speaking immigrants; his father was from Russia and his mother from Romania. Sidney was the oldest of three siblings — he had a brother Martin and a sister Mildred. Born on New York's Lower East Side, Sid grew up in Brooklyn, in a poor neighborhood. Not much is known about his youth, although he seems to have become a jazz fan as a teenager, and at one point tried to become a trumpet player. One source says he started college and then dropped out as a result of the Great Depression. By 1930, the census showed him working at a record store. He first got into radio in 1937, at a radio station in the Bronx at WBNX, where he began as an afternoon disc jockey, doing a show called the Afternoon Swing Session. His show featured the biggest hits by black performers such as Count Basie, Duke Ellington and Ella Fitzgerald. He became extremely popular with young people, many of whom would come to the station hoping to meet him or make a request. In an era when black music was still not frequently heard on the air, Symphony Sid was among the few white announcers who played what was then called "race" or "sepia" recordings on a regular basis. In addition to being an announcer — in 1937, the word "disc jockey" was not yet in common use — Sid sold airtime for his own program and produced the commercials for his sponsors.

== Early radio career ==
The story of how he gained the nickname "Symphony" Sid has been told in multiple contradictory accounts. According to one source, it came from working at the Symphony record store where he introduced R&B records. The predominantly black customers told their friends that they bought the records from Symphony Sid. But another source says it came from a sponsor—a men's clothing store, and when announcer Walter Tolmes opened Sid's show, he rhymed "Here comes the kid with the fancy pants and the fancy lid... Symphony Sid." And yet another source says he got the name from playing "good music" (classical recordings) at his first radio job, before he became known for jazz. This source says the name came from his playing symphonic music every day.

By 1941, Symphony Sid had left WBNX and was working at WHOM in Jersey City, New Jersey, where he became identified with doing the late night shift. His show was called the After-Hours Swing Session. At WHOM, he began to give emerging black performers exposure. He also began to co-produce and promote jazz concerts, in association with Monte Kay. One of their first collaborations was in 1945 (some sources say 1942) at New York's Town Hall; it featured Dizzy Gillespie and Charlie Parker. After WHOM, his career took him briefly to WWRL in New York and then to WMCA. By 1947, he was one of the best known jazz disc jockeys, and airplay on his show could give a major boost to any musician. Some grateful performers even wrote songs that they dedicated to him: for example, in 1947, Arnett Cobb recorded "Walkin' With Sid" for the Apollo label. And also in 1947, Sid began to use a song by Erskine Hawkins, "After Hours", as the theme of his nightly program.

Sid left WMCA in early June 1949, but he didn't have to wait long for his next job. On 20 June 1949, he received his biggest opportunity: a network program on what was then called WJZ—later known as WABC. Thanks to his work on the fledgling ABC Radio Network, he could now be heard in more than 30 states. And as a result of his network show, jazz, especially the music of artists like Miles Davis and Charlie Parker, gained wider exposure with a national audience. Later, critics would refer to him as "the dean of jazz radio".

In his 1957 novel On the Road, based on his travels across the United States in the late 1940's, Jack Kerouac wrote that as he approached New York City in his car he listened to the Symphony Sid show on the radio with the latest jazz.

== Controversy and change ==
Although Sid was white, he was known for his hipster lingo, his love of bebop, and his knowledge of the black music scene. While modern critics later accused white jazz disc jockeys like Symphony Sid and Alan Freed of profiting from black radio and taking jobs away from black announcers (see Sinclair, 1989 for example), this did not seem to be a concern during the years when Sid broadcast. He won several awards from black organizations, including an award for Disc Jockey of the Year presented to him in 1949 by the Global News Syndicate, for his "continuous promotion of negro artists". Among the entertainers he had helped were such jazz performers as Nat King Cole, Sarah Vaughan, Charlie Parker, and Billy Eckstine. As his popularity grew, songs were written about him. For example, there was a reference to "the dial is all set right close to twelve eighty" in the song "Jumpin' With Symphony Sid", which was written by Lester Young with lyrics by King Pleasure; the song mentioned the location on the radio dial where Symphony Sid's Friday night show could be found. "Jumpin' With Symphony Sid" was a hit for the George Shearing Quintet in 1950. Louis Jordan's "After School Swing Session (Swinging With Symphony Sid)" suggests his show's widespread popularity among young listeners ("Everyday we meet on just any old street, listening to Symphony Sid"). In addition, another song, "Symphony in Sid" by Illinois Jacquet was written in tribute to him. However, jazz trumpeter Miles Davis, in Miles: The Autobiography, made numerous complaints about Torin, accusing him of self-aggrandizement and trying to short-change musicians (e.g. J. J. Johnson) who performed in bands and performance dates managed by Torin.

For a while during the mid to late 1940s, Sid broadcast live from the Royal Roost night club in New York. In 1950, he moved the show to Birdland. Sid also did some shows from other New York clubs such as the Three Deuces and Bop City. He also continued to work with concert promoters, serving as MC for jazz concerts at venues like Carnegie Hall.

It seems to have been an open secret that Sid was a regular user of marijuana. While the slang expression was "reefer", a home where marijuana was used and sold was known as "tea pad", and the police raided Sid's apartment in the summer of 1948, and arrested him. He remained on the air while the case was pending, and it finally came to trial in late January 1949. The case was declared a mistrial, but there was some residual damage to Sid's reputation. Some sources say he was fired from WJZ, while others indicate he continued to work as an MC in the clubs. But he evidently decided it was time for a change of scenery, and went with his friend Norman Furman to Boston about 1952. Furman had become general manager of WBMS, which had been doing classical music (the call letters reportedly stood for "World's Best Music Station"). He changed the format and hired Sid, who did a gospel show and a jazz show. But Sid had a unique arrangement with Furman—he worked at WBMS in the daytime, and at night, he worked for WCOP, where he did live jazz shows, just as he had done in New York. During the mid-1950s, Sid could be heard live from the Hi-Hat, a night club owned by Julian Rhodes, in a part of Boston known for live jazz—the area near the intersection of Massachusetts and Columbus Avenues. In the mid-fifties, Sid was instrumental in the growth of the Rhythm & Blues radio in Boston, giving out plastic key chain fobs that said "I Dig You the Most", but he never really embraced the music, and tried to interest his audience in jazz.

== Back to New York ==
By 1957, Sid had left Boston and returned to New York, this time working on WEVD AM & FM. The station in the 1920s and '30s had been known for ethnic music (Yiddish, Italian, etc.) as well as for a very liberal and pro-labor stance on politics (WEVD had been named for socialist Eugene V. Debs). Sid's show featured Latin music, including Afro-Cuban jazz artists such as Mongo Santamaría, Mario Bauzá and Machito. As Donald Fagen recalled in a letter to the Countermoon zine, this choice of music proved controversial, and Sid was dubbed by some the "Jazz Traitor". On the other hand, some critics found his Latin music show both interesting and important, and praised the concept as "an extraordinary meeting of cultures". Then in the late 1970s, encouraged by his engineer, Marty Wilson, Sid again started to play jazz in the last hour of his show. When he retired, he gave Wilson his record collection and the jazz show continued on the weekends. Throughout his time in New York, Sid also continued to be involved with promoting and serving as MC at jazz concerts.

== Final years ==
Sid Torin married three times, all ending in divorce (two of his wives were Eva Peña and Betty Ansley). He had two sons, one born in 1948 and the other in 1951.

He retired to Islamorada in Florida in 1973, where he enjoyed fishing and had his own boat. He also did a full-time airshift on a Miami Beach jazz radio station, WBUS. By all accounts, he was a heavy smoker, and he died of emphysema and heart disease in mid-September 1984. While modern media critics acknowledge his importance and praise him for introducing certain jazz artists to a national audience, surviving recordings where he was the announcer do not fare so well. Many modern critics have referred negatively to his on-air work. For example, his announcing at a 1945 Charlie Parker concert is called "annoying"; another critic who reviewed that same release calls Symphony Sid "odious" and says he "gives a painful imitation of a hipster". However, a few critics place Symphony Sid's style in the context of its time and understand that in his day, his style of announcing was appreciated.

Because of his importance in that pre-rock music era, the staff of the Rock and Roll Hall of Fame in Cleveland has included him in a display about the most influential disc jockeys in history.
