= Claude Thornhill =

American pianist, composer and arranger (1908–1965)

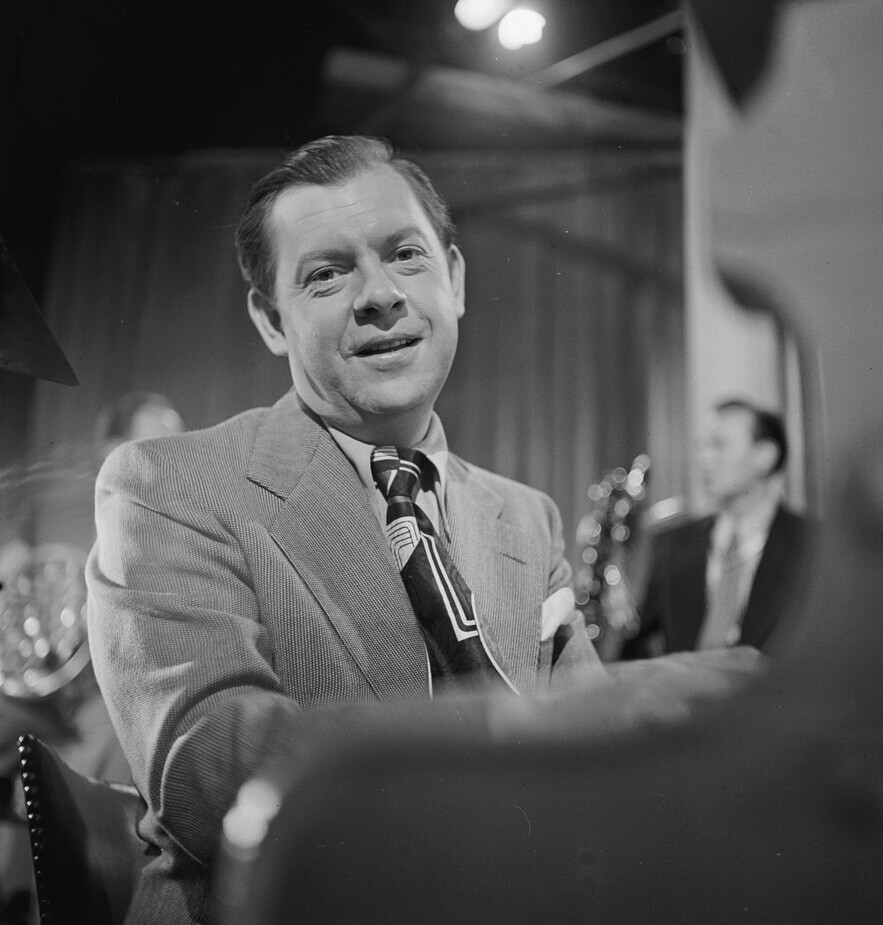
- Thornhill, ca. 1947

Background information
- Born: August 10, 1908; Terre Haute, Indiana, U.S.
- Died: July 1, 1965 (aged 56) Caldwell, New Jersey, U.S.
- Genres: Sweet jazz, big band
- Occupations: Musician, bandleader, arranger, composer
- Instrument: Piano
- Years active: 1924–1965
- Formerly of: Austin Wylie Orchestra; Claude Thornhill Orchestra
- Spouse: Ruth Thornhill (m. 1952)

Claude Thornhill (August 10, 1908 – July 1, 1965) was an American pianist, arranger, composer, and bandleader. He composed the jazz and pop standards "Snowfall" and "I Wish I Had You".

== Early years ==
Thornhill was the son of J. Chester Thornhill and his wife, Maude. When he was 11 years old, he played piano professionally. While still a youth, he played with two local combos. As a student at Garfield High School in Terre Haute, he played with several theater bands. Thornhill studied at the Cincinnati Conservatory of Music and the Curtis Institute of Music in Philadelphia.

== Career ==
As a youth, he was recognized as an extraordinary talent and formed a traveling duo with Danny Polo, a musical prodigy on the clarinet and trumpet from nearby Clinton, Indiana.

He and clarinetist Artie Shaw started their careers at the Golden Pheasant in Cleveland, Ohio, with the Austin Wylie Orchestra. Thornhill and Shaw went to New York together in 1931. Thornhill went to the West Coast in the late 1930s with the Bob Hope Radio Show and arranged for Judy Garland in Babes in Arms. In 1935, he played on sessions with Glenn Miller, including "Solo Hop", which was released on Columbia Records. He also played with Paul Whiteman, Benny Goodman, Ray Noble, and Billie Holiday. He arranged "Loch Lomond" and "Annie Laurie" for Maxine Sullivan.

During the mid-1930s, Thornhill arranged and played piano for Andre Kostelanetz.

In 1939, he founded the Claude Thornhill Orchestra. Polo was his lead clarinet player. Although the Thornhill band was a sophisticated dance band, it became known for its superior jazz musicians and for Thornhill's and Gil Evans's arrangements. The band played without vibrato, so that the timbres of the instruments could be better appreciated. Thornhill encouraged the musicians to develop cool-sounding tones. The band was popular with both musicians and the public. Miles Davis's Birth of the Cool nonet was modeled in part on Thornhill's sound and unconventional instrumentation. The band's most successful records were "Snowfall", "A Sunday Kind of Love", and "Love for Love".

Thornhill was playing at the Paramount Theater in New York for $10,000 a week when he enlisted in the U.S. Navy as an apprentice seaman on October 26, 1942. As chief musician, he performed shows across the Pacific Theater with Jackie Cooper as his drummer and Dennis Day as his vocalist.

In 1946, he was discharged from the Navy and reunited his ensemble. Polo, Gerry Mulligan, and Barry Galbraith returned with new members, Red Rodney, Lee Konitz, Joe Shulman, and Bill Barber. Thornhill and his orchestra played for the Judy, Jill and Johnny variety program on radio on the Mutual Broadcasting System in 1946–1947.

In 1957, Thornhill became Tony Bennett's musical director. He offered his big band library to Gerry Mulligan when Mulligan formed the Concert Jazz Band, but Mulligan declined the gift, since his instrumentation was different. A large portion of his extensive library of music is currently held by Drury University in Springfield, Missouri.

== Death and legacy ==
Thornhill died of a heart attack in Caldwell, New Jersey, at the age of 56. In 1984, he was posthumously inducted into the Big Band and Jazz Hall of Fame.

== Compositions ==
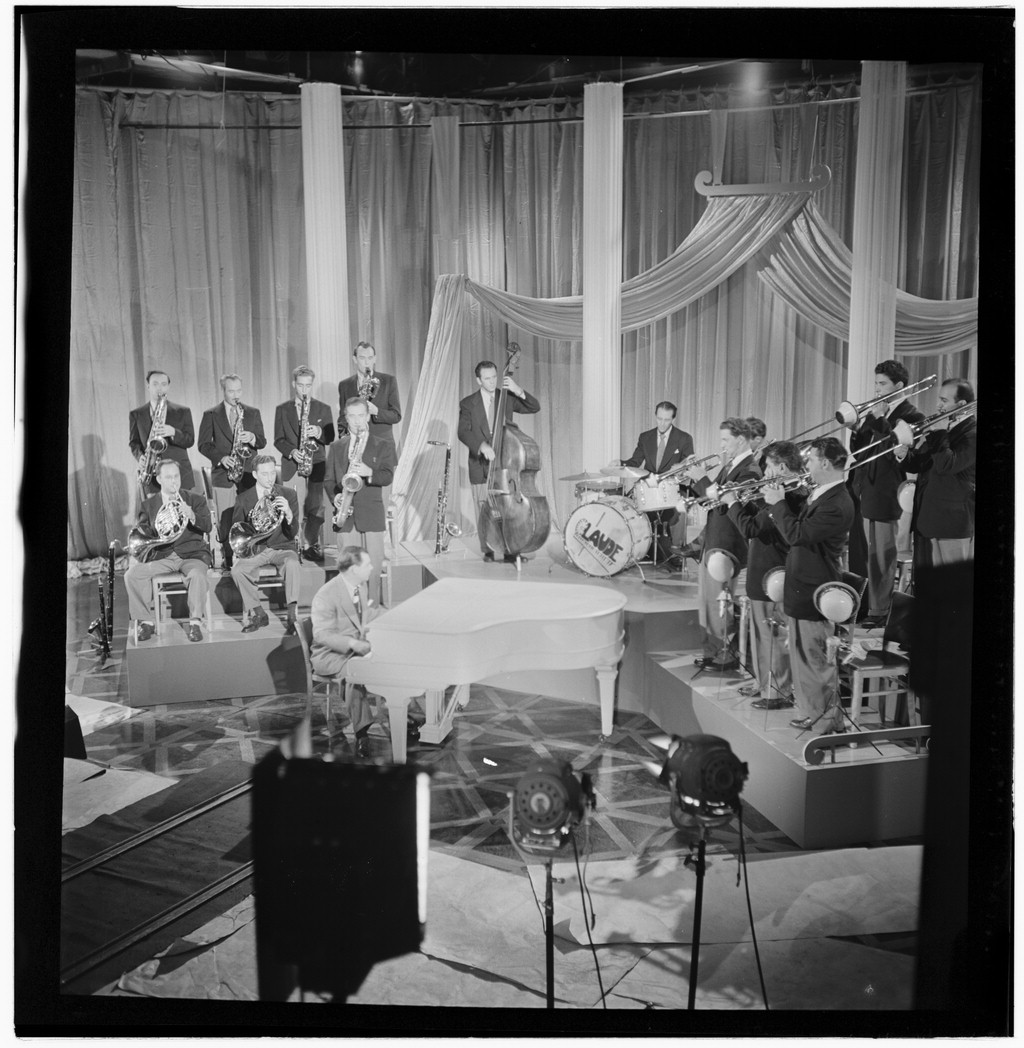
Claude Thornill Orchestra with Joe Shulman, Danny Polo, Lee Konitz, Louis Mucci, Barry Galbraith, Bill Barber, and Billy Exiner, ca. 1947.

Thornhill's compositions included the standard "Snowfall", "I Wish I Had You", recorded by Billie Holiday and Fats Waller, "Let's Go", "Shore Road", "Portrait of a Guinea Farm", "Lodge Podge", "Rustle of Spring", "It's Time for Us to Part", "It Was a Lover and His Lass", "The Little Red Man", "Memory of an Island", and a big band arrangement of the folk song "Where Has My Little Dog Gone?"

=== Cover versions of "Snowfall" ===
Thornhill's 1941 piano composition "Snowfall", later had lyrics written by his wife, Ruth Thornhill. It has been recorded in vocal and non-vocal versions by the following artists:

- Howard Alden and Bucky Pizzarelli
- Avalanches
- BBC Big Band
- Tony Bennett
- Cafe Accordion Orchestra
- Richie Cole with Hank Crawford
- Chris Connor
- Eddie Davis
- Doris Day
- Michael Fortunato
- Four Freshmen
- Esquivel
- Jackie Gleason
- Glen Gray and the Casa Loma Orchestra
- Steve Hall
- Ted Heath
- Skitch Henderson and Bucky Pizzarelli
- Mike Horsfall
- Dick Hyman
- Ahmad Jamal
- Ramsey Lewis Trio
- Enoch Light and the Light Brigade
- Henry Mancini
- Manhattan Transfer
- Helen Merrill
- Glenn Miller and His Orchestra
- The Monkees
- Wes Montgomery
- NRBQ
- Paul Plimley
- Kenny Poole and Gene Bertoncini
- Emily Remler
- Pete Rugolo
- George Shearing
- Singers Unlimited
- Eddie South
- Liz Story
- Billy Vaughn
- John Williams and the Boston Pops
- John Zorn
