= Julia Feldman =

Israeli vocalist, composer and educator (born 1979)

Julia Feldman יוליה פלדמן
- Born: June 22, 1979 (age 46)
- Origin: Samara, Soviet Union
- Genres: Jazz
- Occupations: vocalist, composer, bandleader, educator
- Instruments: vocalist, pianist
- Label: Hed Artzi

Julia Feldman (Hebrew: יוליה פלדמן, Russian: Юлия Фельдман; born June 22, 1979, in Samara, Soviet Union) is an Israeli jazz vocalist, composer and educator. Her singing combines elements of multiple jazz genres, free improvisation and modern classical music.

== Early life and education ==
Feldman was born in Samara into a family with a large musical background- her grandfather, Solomon Feldman, was an accomplished conductor and a leader of the city philharmonic orchestra and her father, Ilya Feldman, while being a jewellery designer, also plays jazz piano. She had been classically trained by studying the piano from the age of 5 till the family's immigration to Israel in 1990. The family resided in Jerusalem, where she continued her classical piano studies with Anatoly Tartakovsky along with jazz improvisation studies with the composer and a saxophone player Stephen Horenstein in the music department of the High School Of Arts in Jerusalem.

In the last year of her high school studies Feldman became interested in jazz singing, and in 1997 she began studying voice technique and jazz improvisation with Israeli jazz vocalist Iris Portugaly along with intensive studies of jazz with the saxophonist Arnie Lawrence at the International Music Center of Jerusalem. At the center, Julia had the opportunity to study and perform with known American jazz musicians, such as Evelyn Blakey, Larry Goldings, Armen Donelian, Bob Meyer, Sheila Jordan, Judi Silvano and the composer Allen Gershwin, to name a few. Feldman was also invited to perform Allen Gershwin's composition "Walk in the wilderness" on a tribute concert dedicated to his father, the known composer George Gershwin.

Between 1998 and 1999, she continued studying vocal jazz with Iris Portugaly at the Rimon School Of Jazz And Contemporary Music, and in 2003 she graduated the Jerusalem Academy of Music and Dance, where she studied voice technique with the opera singer Robin Weisel-Capsouto, jazz improvisation with jazz vocalist Ataliya Pniel and composition in the class of the composer Vyacheslav Ganelin.

== Collaborations, projects and performances ==
Feldman has frequently worked with many jazz artists and music groups. Among those are Arnie Lawrence, Ayelet Rose Gottlieb, Bob Meyer, Boris Gammer, Ed Schuller, Eilon Tourgeman, Jerry Garval, Jean Claude Johns, Judy Lewis, Stephen Horenstein, Steve Peskoff, Yitzhak Yedid and others.

Feldman's groups and projects as a leader: Julia Feldman Ensemble, Julia Feldman Jazz Quartet. Feldman's Ensemble is a changing group- its first version consisted of Feldman as a vocalist, the pianist Yitzhak Yedid, and contrabass player Ora Boasson Horev. The Enseble's debut album "Words Are Worlds (A Tribute to Billie Holiday)" was released in 2006 on a major Israeli label Hed Arzi. The album was inspired by the work and personality of Billie Holiday and features arrangements of the known jazz standards that were performed by Holiday, along with the band's compositions. All the pieces recorded on the album are connected by a leitmotif borrowed from Holiday's ballad "God Bless the Child". The CD was mixed and mastered by Udi Koomran.

The Quartet, which she had formed together with the known Israeli guitar player Steve Peskoff, has been active for several years and has performed on multiple Israeli stages and festivals, gaining wide audience and press` recognition. The group performs Feldman's composition and standards` arrangements, influenced by contemporary jazz genres, rock, funk, Brazilian music styles and free improvisation. In February 2008, Feldman and Peskoff traveled to New York, USA, and recorded the Quartet first album there. The album features Feldman (vocals), Peskoff (guitar), drummer Ferenc Nemeth, bassist Massimo Biolcati, vocalist Ayelet Rose Gottlieb and saxophonist Loren Stillman.

Other projects: lead singer in Musica Ficta - progressive rock band by the guitarist Ehud Horev; vocalist in Radical Shlomo - Steve Peskoff's project of arrangements to Shlomo Carlebach`s songs; pianist, vocalist, co-composer and co-lyricist in Ayulyul with Ayelet Rose Gottlieb; voice-double bass Duo with Eli Magen; collaboration with ethno-core Jerusalem band Shoom, among others.

She has performed in many Israeli jazz clubs and on various festivals, including Shuni Jazz Festival, Tel Aviv International Jazz Festival and the Israel Festival.
