= Chronicle: The Complete Prestige Recordings =

Chronicle: The Complete Prestige Recordings 1951–1956

Box set by Miles Davis
- Released: 1980; 1988 (CD reissue)
- Recorded: 1951–1956
- Genres: Jazz, cool jazz
- Label: Prestige Records

Miles Davis box set chronology
Chronicle: The Complete Prestige Recordings 1951–1956 (1980)	The Miles Davis Collection, Vol. 1: 12 Sides of Miles (1981)

Professional ratings
Review scores
Source	Rating
DownBeat	5/5 stars

Chronicle: The Complete Prestige Recordings is a 12×LP box set by American jazz trumpeter Miles Davis, compiling his sessions between 1951 and 1956 for Prestige Records. It was issued in 1980, and reissued in 1988 on 8×CD as Chronicle: The Complete Prestige Recordings 1951–1956. The box set contains a 64-page illustrated booklet that includes rare photographs, full discographical details, and an analysis of each session by Dan Morgenstern, Director of the Institute of Jazz Studies at Rutgers University.

== Background and recording ==
The box set is a retrospective compilation of Miles Davis' 17 sessions recorded on the Prestige label between 1951 and 1956. The collection represents a fairly mix of ballads, hard bop, and cool jazz featuring his collaborations with major contemporary jazz artists.

Most significant are the group on discs six, seven, and eight containing performances by Davis’ first classic quintet with John Coltrane, Red Garland, Paul Chambers and Philly Joe Jones. Among the others featured in this collection are some of the most influential Jazz artists of that time including Sonny Rollins, Thelonious Monk, Milt Jackson, Charles Mingus and Jackie McLean.

== Track listing ==
CD 1 (all tracks recorded at Apex Studios)
No.	Title	Music	Recording date	Length
1.	"Morpheus" (from Modern Jazz Trumpets)	Miles Davis, Sonny Rollins, John Lewis, Percy Heath, Roy Haynes	1951-01-17	2:24
2.	"Down" (from Modern Jazz Trumpets)	Miles Davis, Sonny Rollins, John Lewis, Percy Heath, Roy Haynes	1951-01-17	2:54
3.	"Blue Room (Take 1)" (from Blue Period)	Miles Davis, Sonny Rollins, John Lewis, Percy Heath, Roy Haynes	1951-01-17	2:51
4.	"Blue Room (Take 2)" (from Miles Davis and Horns)	Miles Davis, Sonny Rollins, John Lewis, Percy Heath, Roy Haynes	1951-01-17	3:04
5.	"Whispering" (from Modern Jazz Trumpets)	Miles Davis, Sonny Rollins, John Lewis, Percy Heath, Roy Haynes	1951-01-17	3:05
6.	"I Know" (from Sonny Rollins with the Modern Jazz Quartet)	Miles Davis, Sonny Rollins, John Lewis, Percy Heath, Roy Haynes	1951-01-17	2:35
7.	"Odjenar" (from Conception)	Miles Davis, Lee Konitz, Sal Mosca, Billy Bauer, Arnold Fishkind, Max Roach	1951-03-08	2:54
8.	"Ezz-Thetic" (from Conception)	Miles Davis, Lee Konitz, Sal Mosca, Billy Bauer, Arnold Fishkind, Max Roach	1951-03-08	2:54
9.	"Hibeck" (from Conception)	Miles Davis, Lee Konitz, Sal Mosca, Billy Bauer, Arnold Fishkind, Max Roach	1951-03-08	3:07
10.	"Yesterdays" (from Conception)	Miles Davis, Lee Konitz, Sal Mosca, Billy Bauer, Arnold Fishkind, Max Roach	1951-03-08	2:28
11.	"Conception" (from The New Sounds)	Miles Davis, Jackie McLean, Sonny Rollins, Walter Bishop Jr., Tommy Potter, Art Blakey	1951-10-05	4:04
12.	"Out of the Blue" (from Blue Period)	Miles Davis, Jackie McLean, Sonny Rollins, Walter Bishop Jr., Tommy Potter, Art Blakey	1951-10-05	6:17
13.	"Denial" (from Dig)	Miles Davis, Jackie McLean, Sonny Rollins, Walter Bishop Jr., Tommy Potter, Art Blakey	1951-10-05	5:42
14.	"Bluing" (from Blue Period)	Miles Davis, Jackie McLean, Sonny Rollins, Walter Bishop Jr., Tommy Potter, Art Blakey	1951-10-05	9:56
15.	"Dig" (from The New Sounds)	Miles Davis, Jackie McLean, Sonny Rollins, Walter Bishop Jr., Tommy Potter, Art Blakey	1951-10-05	7:36
16.	"My Old Flame" (from The New Sounds)	Miles Davis, Jackie McLean, Sonny Rollins, Walter Bishop Jr., Tommy Potter, Art Blakey	1951-10-05	6:36
17.	"It's Only a Paper Moon" (from The New Sounds)	Miles Davis, Jackie McLean, Sonny Rollins, Walter Bishop Jr., Tommy Potter, Art Blakey	1951-10-05	5:24
Total length:				73:53

CD 2 (All tracks recorded at WOR Studios)
No.	Title	Music	Recording date	Length
1.	"Compulsion" (from Collectors' Items)	Miles Davis, Sonny Rollins, Charlie Parker, Walter Bishop Jr., Percy Heath, Philly Joe Jones	1953-02-19	5:45
2.	"The Serpents Tooth (Take 1)" (from Collectors' Items)	Miles Davis, Sonny Rollins, Charlie Parker, Walter Bishop Jr., Percy Heath, Philly Joe Jones	1953-02-19	7:01
3.	"The Serpents Tooth (Take 2)" (from Collectors' Items)	Miles Davis, Sonny Rollins, Charlie Parker, Walter Bishop Jr., Percy Heath, Philly Joe Jones	1953-02-19	6:18
4.	"'Round About Midnight" (from Collectors' Items)	Miles Davis, Sonny Rollins, Charlie Parker, Walter Bishop Jr., Percy Heath, Philly Joe Jones	1953-02-19	7:05
5.	"Tasty Pudding" (from The Compositions of Al Cohn)	Miles Davis, Al Cohn, Zoot Sims, John Lewis, Leonard Gaskin, Kenny Clarke, Sonny Truitt	1953-02-19	3:21
6.	"Willie the Wailer" (from The Compositions of Al Cohn)	Miles Davis, Al Cohn, Zoot Sims, John Lewis, Leonard Gaskin, Kenny Clarke, Sonny Truitt	1953-02-19	4:27
7.	"Floppy" (from The Compositions of Al Cohn)	Miles Davis, Al Cohn, Zoot Sims, John Lewis, Leonard Gaskin, Kenny Clarke, Sonny Truitt	1953-02-19	6:02
8.	"For Adults Only" (from The Compositions of Al Cohn)	Miles Davis, Al Cohn, Zoot Sims, John Lewis, Leonard Gaskin, Kenny Clarke, Sonny Truitt	1953-02-19	5:35
9.	"When Lights Are Low" (from Blue Haze)	Miles Davis, John Lewis, Percy Heath, Max Roach	1953-05-19	3:26
10.	"Tune up" (from Blue Haze)	Miles Davis, John Lewis, Percy Heath, Max Roach	1953-05-19	3:53
11.	"Miles Ahead" (from Blue Haze)	Miles Davis, John Lewis, Percy Heath, Max Roach	1953-05-19	4:28
12.	"Smooch" (from Blue Haze)	Miles Davis, Charles Mingus, Percy Heath, Max Roach	1953-05-19	3:06
13.	"Four" (from Blue Haze)	Miles Davis, Horace Silver, Percy Heath, Art Blakey	1954-03-15	4:01
14.	"Old Devil Moon" (from Blue Haze)	Miles Davis, Horace Silver, Percy Heath, Art Blakey	1954-03-15	3:23
15.	"Blue Haze" (from Blue Haze)	Miles Davis, Horace Silver, Percy Heath, Art Blakey	1954-03-15	6:07
Total length:				74:00

CD 3 (All tracks recorded at Van Gelder Studio)
No.	Title	Music	Recording date	Length
1.	"Solar" (from Walkin')	Miles Davis, Dave Schildkraut, Horace Silver, Percy Heath, Kenny Clarke	1954-04-03	4:44
2.	"You Don't Know What Love Is" (from Walkin)	Miles Davis, Dave Schildkraut, Horace Silver, Percy Heath, Kenny Clarke	1954-04-03	4:24
3.	"Love me or Leave me" (from Walkin)	Miles Davis, Dave Schildkraut, Horace Silver, Percy Heath, Kenny Clarke	1954-04-03	6:58
4.	"I'll Remember April" (from Miles Davis Quintet)	Miles Davis, Dave Schildkraut, Horace Silver, Percy Heath, Kenny Clarke	1954-04-03	7:55
5.	"Blue 'n Boogie" (from Walkin)	Miles Davis, J. J. Johnson, Lucky Thompson, Horace Silver, Percy Heath, Kenny Clarke	1954-04-29	8:18
6.	"Walkin'" (from Walkin)	Miles Davis, J. J. Johnson, Lucky Thompson, Horace Silver, Percy Heath, Kenny Clarke	1954-04-29	13:28
7.	"Airegin" (from Bags' Groove)	Miles Davis, Sonny Rollins, Horace Silver, Percy Heath, Kenny Clarke	1954-06-29	5:00
8.	"Oleo" (from Bags' Groove)	Miles Davis, Sonny Rollins, Horace Silver, Percy Heath, Kenny Clarke	1954-06-29	5:13
9.	"But Not For Me (Take 1)" (from Bags' Groove)	Miles Davis, Sonny Rollins, Horace Silver, Percy Heath, Kenny Clarke	1954-06-29	5:45
10.	"But Not For Me (Take 2)" (from Bags' Groove)	Miles Davis, Sonny Rollins, Horace Silver, Percy Heath, Kenny Clarke	1954-06-29	4:37
11.	"Doxy" (from Bags' Groove)	Miles Davis, Sonny Rollins, Horace Silver, Percy Heath, Kenny Clarke	1954-06-29	4:52
Total length:				71:16

CD 4 (All tracks recorded at Van Gelder Studio)
No.	Title	Music	Recording date	Length
1.	"Bags' Groove (Take 1)" (from Bags' Groove)	Miles Davis, Milt Jackson, Thelonious Monk, Percy Heath, Kenny Clarke	1954-12-24	11:11
2.	"Bags' Groove (Take 2)" (from Bags' Groove)	Miles Davis, Milt Jackson, Thelonious Monk, Percy Heath, Kenny Clarke	1954-12-24	9:21
3.	"Bemsha Swing" (from Miles Davis and the Modern Jazz Giants)	Miles Davis, Milt Jackson, Thelonious Monk, Percy Heath, Kenny Clarke	1954-12-24	9:27
4.	"Swing Spring" (from Miles Davis and the Modern Jazz Giants)	Miles Davis, Milt Jackson, Thelonious Monk, Percy Heath, Kenny Clarke	1954-12-24	10:39
5.	"The Man I Love (take 1)" (from Miles Davis and the Modern Jazz Giants)	Miles Davis, Milt Jackson, Thelonious Monk, Percy Heath, Kenny Clarke	1954-12-24	8:02
6.	"The Man I Love (take 2)" (from Miles Davis and the Modern Jazz Giants)	Miles Davis, Milt Jackson, Thelonious Monk, Percy Heath, Kenny Clarke	1954-12-24	7:57
7.	"I Didn't" (from The Musings of Miles)	Miles Davis, Red Garland, Oscar Pettiford, Philly Joe Jones	1955-07-07	6:02
8.	"Will You Still Be Mine?" (from The Musings Of Miles)	Miles Davis, Red Garland, Oscar Pettiford, Philly Joe Jones	1955-07-07	6:20
Total length:				68:59

CD 5 (All tracks recorded at Van Gelder Studio)
No.	Title	Music	Recording date	Length
1.	"Green Haze" (from The Musings Of Miles)	Miles Davis, Red Garland, Oscar Pettiford, Philly Joe Jones	1955-07-07	5:50
2.	"I See Your Face Before Me" (from The Musings Of Miles)	Miles Davis, Red Garland, Oscar Pettiford, Philly Joe Jones	1955-07-07	4:46
3.	"A Night in Tunisia" (from The Musings Of Miles)	Miles Davis, Red Garland, Oscar Pettiford, Philly Joe Jones	1955-07-07	7:24
4.	"A Gal in Calico" (from The Musings Of Miles)	Miles Davis, Red Garland, Oscar Pettiford, Philly Joe Jones	1955-07-07	5:16
5.	"Dr. Jackle" (from Quintet/Sextet)	Miles Davis, Jackie McLean, Milt Jackson, Ray Bryant, Percy Heath, Art Taylor	1955-08-05	8:54
6.	"Bitty Ditty" (from Quintet/Sextet)	Miles Davis, Milt Jackson, Ray Bryant, Percy Heath, Art Taylor	1955-08-05	6:38
7.	"Minor March" (from Quintet/Sextet)	Miles Davis, Jackie McLean, Milt Jackson, Ray Bryant, Percy Heath, Art Taylor	1955-08-05	8:17
8.	"Changes" (from Quintet/Sextet)	Miles Davis, Milt Jackson, Ray Bryant, Percy Heath, Art Taylor	1955-08-05	7:14
9.	"In Your Own Sweet Way" (from Collectors' Items)	Miles Davis, Sonny Rollins, Tommy Flanagan, Paul Chambers, Art Taylor	1956-03-16	4:38
10.	"No Line" (from Collectors' Items)	Miles Davis, Sonny Rollins, Tommy Flanagan, Paul Chambers, Art Taylor	1956-03-16	5:42
11.	"Vierd Blues" (from Collectors' Items)	Miles Davis, Sonny Rollins, Tommy Flanagan, Paul Chambers, Art Taylor	1956-03-16	6:52
Total length:				71:33

CD 6 (All tracks recorded at Van Gelder Studio)
No.	Title	Music	Recording date	Length
1.	"Stablemates" (from Miles: The New Miles Davis Quintet)	Miles Davis, John Coltrane, Red Garland, Paul Chambers, Philly Joe Jones	1955-11-16	5:21
2.	"How Am I to Know?" (from Miles: The New Miles Davis Quintet)	Miles Davis, John Coltrane, Red Garland, Paul Chambers, Philly Joe Jones	1955-11-16	4:41
3.	"Just Squeeze Me" (from Miles: The New Miles Davis Quintet)	Miles Davis, John Coltrane, Red Garland, Paul Chambers, Philly Joe Jones	1955-11-16	7:27
4.	"There is No Greater Love" (from Miles: The New Miles Davis Quintet)	Miles Davis, John Coltrane, Red Garland, Paul Chambers, Philly Joe Jones	1955-11-16	5:20
5.	"The Theme" (from Miles: The New Miles Davis Quintet)	Miles Davis, John Coltrane, Red Garland, Paul Chambers, Philly Joe Jones	1955-11-16	5:50
6.	"S'posin'" (from Miles: The New Miles Davis Quintet)	Miles Davis, John Coltrane, Red Garland, Paul Chambers, Philly Joe Jones	1955-11-16	5:16
7.	"In Your Own Sweet Way" (from Workin' with the Miles Davis Quintet)	Miles Davis, John Coltrane, Red Garland, Paul Chambers, Philly Joe Jones	1956-05-11	5:45
8.	"Diane" (from Steamin' with The Miles Davis Quintet)	Miles Davis, John Coltrane, Red Garland, Paul Chambers, Philly Joe Jones	1956-05-11	7:50
9.	"Trane's Blues" (from Workin' with the Miles Davis Quintet)	Miles Davis, John Coltrane, Red Garland, Paul Chambers, Philly Joe Jones	1956-05-11	8:30
10.	"Something I Dreamed Last Night" (from Steamin' With The Miles Davis Quintet)	Miles Davis, Red Garland, Paul Chambers, Philly Joe Jones	1956-05-11	6:13
Total length:				62:15

CD 7 (All tracks recorded at Van Gelder Studio)
No.	Title	Music	Recording date	Length
1.	"It Could Happen to You" (from Relaxin' with The Miles Davis Quintet)	Miles Davis, John Coltrane, Red Garland, Paul Chambers, Philly Joe Jones	1956-05-11	6:28
2.	"Woody 'n You" (from Relaxin' With The Miles Davis Quintet)	Miles Davis, John Coltrane, Red Garland, Paul Chambers, Philly Joe Jones	1956-05-11	4:53
3.	"Ahmad's Blues" (from Workin' with the Miles Davis Quintet)	Red Garland, Paul Chambers, Philly Joe Jones	1956-05-11	7:21
4.	"Surrey with the Fringe on Top" (from Steamin' With The Miles Davis Quintet)	Miles Davis, John Coltrane, Red Garland, Paul Chambers, Philly Joe Jones	1956-05-11	9:02
5.	"It Never Entered My Mind" (from Workin' with the Miles Davis Quintet)	Miles Davis, Red Garland, Paul Chambers, Philly Joe Jones	1956-05-11	5:20
6.	"When I Fall in Love" (from Steamin' With The Miles Davis Quintet)	Miles Davis, Red Garland, Paul Chambers, Philly Joe Jones	1956-05-11	4:21
7.	"Salt Peanuts" (from Steamin' With The Miles Davis Quintet)	Miles Davis, John Coltrane, Red Garland, Paul Chambers, Philly Joe Jones	1956-05-11	6:06
8.	"Four" (from Workin' with the Miles Davis Quintet)	Miles Davis, John Coltrane, Red Garland, Paul Chambers, Philly Joe Jones	1956-05-11	7:11
9.	"The Theme (take 1)" (from Workin' with the Miles Davis Quintet)	Miles Davis, John Coltrane, Red Garland, Paul Chambers, Philly Joe Jones	1956-05-11	1:57
10.	"The Theme (take 2)" (from Workin' with the Miles Davis Quintet)	Miles Davis, John Coltrane, Red Garland, Paul Chambers, Philly Joe Jones	1956-05-11	1:02
11.	"If I Were a Bell" (from Relaxin' with The Miles Davis Quintet)	Miles Davis, John Coltrane, Red Garland, Paul Chambers, Philly Joe Jones	1956-10-26	8:05
12.	"Well, You Needn't" (from Steamin' With The Miles Davis Quintet)	Miles Davis, John Coltrane, Red Garland, Paul Chambers, Philly Joe Jones	1956-10-26	6:14
Total length:				68:10

CD 8 (All tracks recorded at Van Gelder Studio)
No.	Title	Music	Recording date	Length
1.	"'Round About Midnight" (from Miles Davis And The Modern Jazz Giants)	Miles Davis, John Coltrane, Red Garland, Paul Chambers, Philly Joe Jones	1956-10-26	5:19
2.	"Half Nelson" (from Workin' with The Miles Davis Quintet)	Miles Davis, John Coltrane, Red Garland, Paul Chambers, Philly Joe Jones	1956-10-26	4:37
3.	"You're My Everything" (from Relaxin' with The Miles Davis Quintet)	Miles Davis, John Coltrane, Red Garland, Paul Chambers, Philly Joe Jones	1956-10-26	4:50
4.	"I Could Write a Book" (from Relaxin' with The Miles Davis Quintet)	Miles Davis, John Coltrane, Red Garland, Paul Chambers, Philly Joe Jones	1956-10-26	5:11
5.	"Oleo" (from Relaxin' with The Miles Davis Quintet)	Miles Davis, John Coltrane, Red Garland, Paul Chambers, Philly Joe Jones	1956-10-26	5:55
6.	"Airegin" (from Cookin' with The Miles Davis Quintet)	Miles Davis, John Coltrane, Red Garland, Paul Chambers, Philly Joe Jones	1956-10-26	4:27
7.	"Tune Up" (from Cookin' with The Miles Davis Quintet)	Miles Davis, John Coltrane, Red Garland, Paul Chambers, Philly Joe Jones	1956-10-26	5:44
8.	"When Lights are Low" (from Cookin' with The Miles Davis Quintet)	Miles Davis, John Coltrane, Red Garland, Paul Chambers, Philly Joe Jones	1956-10-26	7:32
9.	"Blues by Five" (from Cookin' with The Miles Davis Quintet)	Miles Davis, John Coltrane, Red Garland, Paul Chambers, Philly Joe Jones	1956-10-26	10:01
10.	"My Funny Valentine" (from Cookin' with The Miles Davis Quintet)	Miles Davis, John Coltrane, Red Garland, Paul Chambers, Philly Joe Jones	1956-10-26	6:01
Total length:				59:51

== Notes and references ==
Information about song details is taken from the box set.
