= Miles '54: The Prestige Recordings =

Compilation album by Miles Davis
- Released: August 13, 2024
- Recorded: March 15, 1954; April 3 and 29, 1954; June 29, 1954; December 24, 1954
- Studio: Beltone Studios (March 15); Van Gelder Studio, Hackensack (all others)
- Genre: Jazz
- Length: Disc one 69:46; Disc two 72:41
- Label: Craft Recordings
- Producer: Nick Phillips

Miles Davis chronology
The Bootleg Series, Vol. 7: That's What Happened 1982–1985 (2022)	Miles '54: The Prestige Recordings (2024)

Professional ratings
Review scores
Source	Rating
Allmusic	3.5/5 stars

Miles '54: The Prestige Recordings is a compilation album of recordings made in 1954 by the jazz musician Miles Davis for Prestige Records. It was released by Craft Recordings in 2024 as either two compact discs or four long-playing vinyl records. Its titles had been originally released on the previous ten-inch records for Prestige Miles Davis Quartet, Miles Davis All Star Sextet, Miles Davis Quintet, Miles Davis with Sonny Rollins, and the two volumes of Miles Davis All Stars. The original recordings were produced by Bob Weinstock.

== Background ==
After spending much of 1953 either at his father's home or in Detroit to end his drug problems, Davis returned to New York City in February 1954. After one final date for Blue Note Records as a leader, Davis resumed fulfilling his contract for Prestige Records which dated back to 1951. He recorded for no other label for the rest of the year, engaging in studio sessions with various pick-up groups.

Although Davis had been recording steadily in the 1950s, by the time of these sessions very little released had the same impact as the Birth of the Cool records from five years earlier. In the month he arrived in New York, a seminal event in the emerging style of hard bop took place with the recording of the Art Blakey Quintet at Birdland. A protean version of The Jazz Messengers, this quintet included Horace Silver and Clifford Brown. All three would be prominent figures in hard bop, Blakey and Silver with the original Messengers and Brown co-leading his quintet with Max Roach.

== Content ==
Sessions covered by this compilation took place over five dates in 1954; other than Davis, bassist Percy Heath would be the only musician common to all five. The March 15 session took place at Beltone Studios in New York City, a quartet date with Horace Silver and Art Blakey of two Davis originals and one pop standard. Davis would keep the title "Four" in his book for over a decade; a version appears on the 1966 live album for Columbia Four & More. All other sessions relocated to the first studio of Rudy Van Gelder in Hackensack, and Kenny Clarke would replace Blakey on drums. The April 3 session featured Davis on Harmon mute and included Silver and saxophonist Dave Schildkraut for three standards and another Davis original, "Solar."

The remaining three sessions are of greater historical value. The April 29 date with trombonist J.J. Johnson, saxophonist Lucky Thompson, and Silver comprised but two long jams, the first on the Dizzy Gillespie jazz standard "Blue 'n' Boogie," along with the studio version of Davis' hard bop anthem, "Walkin'." Authorship of the latter has a convoluted history; generally attributed to one Richard Carpenter, it had been recorded at other times by Davis and credited to himself. The recording of "Walkin'" exemplified the imminent funky style of hard bop and was a turning point for Davis on record commercially. Seen as his first masterpiece, it placed him firmly in the vanguard of the emerging form of hard bop and its players.

The June session, the last with Silver, included Sonny Rollins and introduced three originals by the saxophonist that would all become standards. A star-maker turn by Davis, this was a breakthrough for Rollins on his way to becoming a top-rank jazz artist, joining the Clifford Brown-Max Roach quintet in 1955, his reputation reaching a national level later in the decade.

The final date on Christmas Eve featured Davis backed up by the Modern Jazz Quartet with Thelonious Monk substituting for John Lewis. Much has been made of the tension during the session as Davis instructed Monk to not play when Davis did. Monk may have been irritated by the fact that producer Weinstock had given Monk another date as a sideman rather than a leader and had initially barred any Monk originals from being recorded for the session.

The year chronicled in these recordings was very important for Davis, re-establishing his reputation as a rising jazz musician. These sessions included many noted musicians, among them Rollins, Johnson, Silver, Monk, and Blakey, who would all reconvene in 1957 for Rollins' Volume 2 album on Blue Note. By the next year, Davis would form his first long-term band.

== Track listing ==
Disc one
No.	Title	Writer(s)	Recording date	Length
1.	"Four"	Miles Davis	March 15, 1954	4:03
2.	"Old Devil Moon"	Yip Harburg, Burton Lane	March 15, 1954	3:25
3.	"Blue Haze"	Miles Davis	March 15, 1954	6:12
4.	"Solar"	Miles Davis	April 3, 1954	4:45
5.	"You Don't Know What Love Is"	Don Raye, Gene de Paul	April 3, 1954	4:24
6.	"Love Me or Leave Me"	Gus Kahn, Walter Donaldson	April 3, 1954	6:58
7.	"I'll Remember April"	Patricia Johnston, Don Raye, Gene de Paul	April 3, 1954	7:55
8.	"Blue 'n' Boogie"	Dizzy Gillespie, Frank Paparelli	April 29, 1954	8:18
9.	"Walkin'"	Richard Carpenter	April 29, 1954	13:28
10.	"Airegin"	Sonny Rollins	June 29, 1954	4:59
11.	"Oleo"	Sonny Rollins	June 29, 1954	5:14

Disc two
No.	Title	Writer(s)	Recording date	Length
1.	"But Not for Me" (take 1)	Ira Gershwin, George Gershwin	June 29, 1954	5:45
2.	"But Not for Me" (take 2)	Ira Gershwin, George Gershwin	June 29, 1954	4:37
3.	"Doxy"	Sonny Rollins	June 29, 1954	4:54
4.	"Bags' Groove" (take 1)	Milt Jackson	December 24, 1954	11:14
5.	"Bags' Groove" (take 2)	Milt Jackson	December 24, 1954	9:22
6.	"Bemsha Swing"	Thelonious Monk	December 24, 1954	9:33
7.	"Swing Spring"	Miles Davis	December 24, 1954	10:45
8.	"The Man I Love" (take 1)	Ira Gershwin, George Gershwin	December 24, 1954	8:30
9.	"The Man I Love" (take 2)	Ira Gershwin, George Gershwin	December 24, 1954	7:56

== Personnel ==
- Miles Davis — trumpet
- J.J. Johnson — trombone on "Blue 'n' Boogie" and "Walkin'"
- Dave Schildkraut — alto saxophone on "Solar," "Love Me or Leave Me," and "I Remember April"
- Lucky Thompson — tenor saxophone on "Blue 'n' Boogie" and "Walkin'"
- Sonny Rollins — tenor saxophone on "Airegin," "Oleo," "But Not for Me," and "Doxy"
- Milt Jackson — vibraphone on "Bags' Groove," "Bemsha Swing," "Swing Spring," and "The Man I Love"
- Horace Silver — piano all tracks except as below
- Thelonious Monk — piano on "Bags' Groove," "Bemsha Swing," "Swing Spring," and "The Man I Love"
- Percy Heath — bass
- Kenny Clarke — drums all tracks except as below
- Art Blakey — drums on "Four," "Old Devil Moon," and "Blue Haze"

Production personnel

- Bob Weinstock — original producer
- Nick Phillips – compilation producer
- Mason Williams – project supervision
- Paul Blakemore — mastering
- Chris Clough – project assistance
- Ashley Kahn, Dan Morgenstern — liner notes

== See also ==
- Chronicle: The Complete Prestige Recordings 1951–1956
- The Legendary Prestige Quintet Sessions
