= The Compositions of Al Cohn =

Studio album by Miles Davis
- Released: 1953
- Recorded: February 19, 1953
- Studios: Beltone, New York City
- Genre: Jazz
- Length: 19:16
- Labels: Prestige; PRLP 154
- Producer: Bob Weinstock

Miles Davis chronology
Blue Period (1953)	The Compositions of Al Cohn (1953)	Miles Davis Volume 2 (1953)

Professional ratings
Review scores
Source	Rating
The Encyclopedia of Popular Music	3/5 stars

The Compositions of Al Cohn is a 10" LP by jazz musician Miles Davis, recorded on February 19, 1953, and released later that year on Prestige, his third album as leader for the label, and fourth altogether, following 1952's Young Man with a Horn for Blue Note.

== Background ==
All the tunes were written by tenor saxophonist, composer and arranger Al Cohn. Ira Gitler's liner notes explain the desire to return to arranged music, along the lines of the Birth of the Cool sessions, following three albums focused more on soloing. "[I]t was felt that Miles needed a change of pace for his next recording date; compositions and arrangements which would suit him and result in a happy combination of arranged music and solo work ... Three of the pieces, "Willie The Wailer", "Floppy", and "For Adults Only" were written for this session. "Tasty Pudding" had been written before but Al arranged it specially for Miles and this date."

In his autobiography, Davis suggests Bob Weinstock had pressured him to record a more disciplined album with more "respectable" musicians, following the debacle of the incomplete session with Charlie Parker attempted earlier that year (released in 1956 on Collectors' Items).

After the 10" LP format was discontinued, the four tracks were all included on the 12" album Miles Davis and Horns (PRLP 7025).

== Track listing ==
All tracks are written by Al Cohn.

Side one
No.	Title	Length
1.	"Tasty Pudding"	3:20
2.	"Floppy"	6:00
Total length:		9:20

Side two
No.	Title	Length
1.	"Willie the Wailer"	4:26
2.	"For Adults Only"	5:33
Total length:		9:59

== Personnel ==
- Miles Davis – trumpet
- Al Cohn – tenor saxophone
- Zoot Sims – tenor saxophone
- Sonny Truitt – trombone
- John Lewis – piano
- Kenny Clarke – drums
- Leonard Gaskin – double bass
