= Miles Davis Vols. 1 & 2 =

Miles Davis
- Volume 1

Compilation album by Miles Davis
- Released: January 1956 (Vol. 1); February 1956 (Vol. 2)
- Recorded: May 9, 1952; April 20, 1953; March 6, 1954
- Studio: WOR Studios, NYC; Van Gelder Studio, Hackensack, New Jersey
- Genre: Hard bop
- Length: 43:36 (Vol. 1; LP); 44:31 (Vol. 2; LP); 58:18 (Vol. 1; CD); 39:17 (Vol. 2; CD)
- Label: Blue Note; BLP 1501 (Vol. 1); BLP 1502 (Vol. 2)
- Producer: Alfred Lion

Miles Davis chronology
Dig (1956)	Miles Davis (1956)	Quintet / Sextet (1956)

Miles Davis
- Volume 2

Miles Davis, Volumes 1 & 2 are a pair of separate but related albums by American jazz trumpeter Miles Davis recorded on May 9, 1952, April 20, 1953 and March 6, 1954 and released on Blue Note early 1956. The three sessions were originally released on ten-inch LPs as Young Man with a Horn (1953), Miles Davis, Vol. 2 (1953) and Miles Davis, Vol. 3 (1954), respectively.

== Background ==
=== Personal life ===
Volume 1 was originally released in January 1956 shortly after Davis won the DownBeat readers poll as best trumpeter and shortly followed in February by Volume 2 (BLP 1502).

=== Release history ===
After 10"s lost the format war, Blue Note began reissuing its Modern Jazz Series on 12"s. The three sessions were subsequently recompiled across Miles Davis, Volume 1 (BLP 1501) and Miles Davis, Volume 2 (BLP 1502), the first of Blue Note's 1500 series, their first one hundred 12" records after they discontinued their line of 10" records.

The two volumes were recompiled for their CD reissue, restoring the track listing of the original 10"s, placing Vol. 1 (BLP 2028) on Volume 1, and Vol. 2 (BLP 5057) and Vol. 3 (BLP 5070) on Volume 2.

While the original BLP 1501 running order is available on some Japanese CD versions and from HDTracks, most CD reissues recompile the three sets with an entirely different track listing, grouping the sessions together and appending alternate takes, placing the 1952 and 1954 sessions on Volume 1 and the 1953 session on Volume 2.

When Rudy Van Gelder remastered the pair of the 2001 RVG edition, he reused the CD track list and replaced the covers for the two volumes with new covers based on the originals from Miles Davis, Vol. 3 and Miles Davis, Vol. 2 respectively.

== Reception ==
Professional ratings
Review scores
Source	Rating
AllMusic	4/5 stars
The Penguin Guide to Jazz Recordings	3/4 stars

The album was identified by Scott Yanow in his AllMusic essay "Hard Bop" in 2010 as one of the 17 Essential Hard Bop Recordings.

== Track listing ==
=== Miles Davis, Volume 1 ===
Side 1
No.	Title	Writer(s)	Date recorded	Length
1.	"Tempus Fugit"	Bud Powell	April 20, 1953	3:53
2.	"Kelo"	Jay Jay Johnson	April 20, 1953	3:30
3.	"Enigma"	Johnson	April 20, 1953	3:25
4.	"Ray's Idea"	Gil Fuller; Ray Brown	April 20, 1953	3:46
5.	"How Deep Is the Ocean?"	Irving Berlin	May 9, 1952	4:40
6.	"C.T.A." (alternate take)	Jimmy Heath	April 20, 1953	3:18

Side 2
No.	Title	Writer(s)	Date recorded	Length
1.	"Dear Old Stockholm"	Traditional	May 9, 1952	4:13
2.	"Chance It"	Oscar Pettiford	May 9, 1952	3:04
3.	"Yesterdays"	Jerome Kern; Otto Harbach	May 9, 1952	3:46
4.	"Donna" (alternate take)	Jackie McLean	May 9, 1952	3:12
5.	"C.T.A."	Jimmy Heath	April 20, 1953	3:36
6.	"Woody 'n' You" (alternate take)	Dizzy Gillespie	May 9, 1952	3:23
Total length:				43:36

=== Miles Davis, Volume 2 ===
Side 2
No.	Title	Writer(s)	Date recorded	Length
1.	"Take Off"	Miles Davis	March 6, 1954	3:41
2.	"Weirdo"	Davis	March 6, 1954	4:45
3.	"Woody 'n' You"	Dizzy Gillespie	May 9, 1952	3:26
4.	"I Waited for You"	Fuller; Gillespie	April 20, 1953	3:31
5.	"Ray's Idea" (alternate take)	Fuller; Ray Brown	April 20, 1953	3:53
6.	"Donna"	Jackie McLean	May 9, 1952	3:14

Side 2
No.	Title	Writer(s)	Date recorded	Length
1.	"Well, You Needn't"	Thelonious Monk	March 6, 1954	5:24
2.	"The Leap"	Davis	March 6, 1954	4:32
3.	"Lazy Susan"	Davis	March 6, 1954	4:03
4.	"Tempus Fugit" (alternate take)	Bud Powell	April 20, 1953	3:31
5.	"It Never Entered My Mind"	Richard Rodgers; Lorenz Hart	March 6, 1954	4:01
Total length:				44:31

=== CD reissues ===
Miles Davis, Volume 1
No.	Title	Writer(s)	Date recorded	Length
1.	"Dear Old Stockholm"	Traditional	May 9, 1952	4:13
2.	"Chance It"	Oscar Pettiford	May 9, 1952	3:04
3.	"Donna" (a.k.a. Dig)	Jackie McLean	May 9, 1952	3:14
4.	"Woody 'n' You"	Dizzy Gillespie	May 9, 1952	3:26
5.	"Yesterdays"	Jerome Kern, Otto Harbach	May 9, 1952	3:46
6.	"How Deep Is the Ocean?"	Irving Berlin	May 9, 1952	4:40
7.	"Chance It" (alternate take)	Oscar Pettiford	May 9, 1952	2:54
8.	"Donna" (alternate take)	Jackie McLean	May 9, 1952	3:12
9.	"Woody 'n' You" (alternate take)	Dizzy Gillespie	May 9, 1952	3:23
10.	"Take Off"	Miles Davis	March 6, 1954	3:41
11.	"Lazy Susan"	Miles Davis	March 6, 1954	4:03
12.	"The Leap"	Miles Davis	March 6, 1954	4:32
13.	"Well, You Needn't"	Thelonious Monk	March 6, 1954	5:24
14.	"Weirdo"	Miles Davis	March 6, 1954	4:45
15.	"It Never Entered My Mind"	Richard Rodgers; Lorenz Hart	March 6, 1954	4:01
Total length:				58:17

Miles Davis, Volume 2
No.	Title	Writer(s)	Date recorded	Length
1.	"Kelo"	Jay Jay Johnson	April 20, 1953	3:20
2.	"Enigma"	Jay Jay Johnson	April 20, 1953	3:25
3.	"Ray's Idea"	Gil Fuller, Ray Brown	April 20, 1953	3:46
4.	"Tempus Fugit"	Bud Powell	April 20, 1953	3:53
5.	"C.T.A."	Jimmy Heath	April 20, 1953	3:36
6.	"I Waited for You"	Gil Fuller, Dizzy Gillespie	April 20, 1953	3:31
7.	"Kelo" (alternate take)	Jay Jay Johnson	April 20, 1953	3:27
8.	"Enigma" (alternate take)	Jay Jay Johnson	April 20, 1953	3:27
9.	"Ray's Idea" (alternate take)	Gil Fuller, Ray Brown	April 20, 1953	3:53
10.	"Tempus Fugit" (alternate take)	Bud Powell	April 20, 1953	4:01
11.	"C.T.A." (alternate take)	Jimmy Heath	April 20, 1953	3:18
Total length:				39:17

== Personnel ==
=== Musicians ===
==== May 9, 1952 ====
- Miles Davis – trumpet
- J. J. Johnson – trombone
- Jackie McLean – alto saxophone
- Gil Coggins – piano
- Oscar Pettiford – bass
- Kenny Clarke – drums
  - Recorded at WOR Studios, New York City

==== April 20, 1953 ====
- Miles Davis – trumpet
- J. J. Johnson – trombone
- Jimmy Heath – tenor saxophone
- Gil Coggins – piano
- Percy Heath – bass
- Art Blakey – drums
  - Recorded at WOR Studios, New York City

==== March 6, 1954 ====
- Miles Davis – trumpet
- Horace Silver – piano
- Percy Heath – bass
- Art Blakey – drums
  - Recorded at Van Gelder Studio, Hackensack, New Jersey

=== Technical personnel ===
==== Original ====
- Alfred Lion – producer
- Doug Hawkins (1952, 1953) – recording engineer
- Rudy Van Gelder (1954) – recording engineer
- John Hermansader, Reid Miles – cover design
- Francis Wolff – photography
- Leonard Feather – liner notes

==== Reissue ====
- Michael Cuscuna – producer
- Ron McMaster, Yoshio Okazaki – digital transfers
