= Conception (album) =

Compilation album by Miles Davis, Stan Getz, Lee Konitz
- Released: 1956
- Recorded: 1949–1951; New York City
- Genre: Jazz
- Length: 39:36
- Label: Prestige; PRLP 7013
- Producer: Bob Weinstock

Miles Davis chronology
Birth of the Cool (1949)	Conception (1956)	Blue Period (1951)

Lee Konitz chronology
Subconscious-Lee (1950)	The New Sounds (1951)	Lee Konitz Plays with the Gerry Mulligan Quartet (1953)

Lee Konitz: The New Sounds 10"LP

Professional ratings
Review scores
Source	Rating
Allmusic	4.5/5 stars

Conception is a compilation album issued by Prestige Records in 1956 as PRLP 7013, featuring Miles Davis on a number of tracks. The album, compiled from earlier 10 inch LPs, or as 78 rpm singles, also features musicians such as Lee Konitz, Sonny Rollins, Stan Getz, Gerry Mulligan, and Zoot Sims. The cover was designed by Bob Parent. In particular, the entirety of the 10"LP Lee Konitz: The New Sounds (PRLP 116) makes up all of side 1.

== Track listing ==
1. "Odjenar" (George Russell) - 2:52
2. "Hibeck" (Lee Konitz) - 3:07
3. "Yesterdays" (Jerome Kern) - 2:27
4. "Ezz-Thetic" (Russell) - 2:54
5. "Indian Summer" (Victor Herbert) - 2:35
6. "Duet for Saxophone and Guitar" (Konitz) - 2:41
7. "Conception" (George Shearing) - 4:03
8. "My Old Flame" (Sam Coslow, Arthur Johnston) - 6:36
9. "Intoit" (Stan Getz) - 3:22
10. "Prezervation" (Getz) - 2:44
11. "I May Be Wrong" (Gerry Mulligan) - 3:28
12. "So What" (Mulligan) - 2:44

Note: The final track, "So What", is not the same composition attributed to Miles Davis for his 1959 album Kind of Blue.

== Recording sessions and personnel ==
=== June 21, 1949 (NYC) ===
"Prezervation"

- Stan Getz - Tenor sax
- Al Haig - Piano
- Gene Ramey - Bass
- Stan Levey - Drums

originally released on the 78 rpm single:

- Prestige 818: Stan Getz - Battleground / Prezervation

=== 1950 ===
==== January 6 (NYC) ====
"Intoit"

- Stan Getz - Tenor sax
- Al Haig - Piano
- Tommy Potter - Bass
- Roy Haynes - Drums

originally released on the 78 rpm single:

- Prestige 867: Stan Getz - Intoit / You Stepped Out Of A Dream

==== March 15 (NYC) ====
"I May Be Wrong"

- Don Ferrara, Howard McGhee, Al Porcino - Trumpets
- J.J. Johnson, Kai Winding - Trombones
- Charlie Kennedy - Alto sax
- Georgie Auld, Zoot Sims - Tenor saxes
- Gerry Mulligan - Baritone sax
- Tony Aless - Piano
- Chubby Jackson - Bass
- Don Lamond - Drums

"So What"

- Gerry Mulligan - Baritone sax
- Zoot Sims - Tenor sax
- Charlie Kennedy - Alto sax
- J. J. Johnson, Kai Winding - Trombones
- Tony Aless - Piano
- Chubby Jackson - Bass
- Don Lamond - Drums

"I May Be Wrong" and "So What" were originally issued on the 10"LP Chubby Jackson All Star Big Band (PRLP 105), although they are here credited to Gerry Mulligan.

=== 1951 ===
==== March 8 (NYC) ====
"Odjenar", "Hibeck", "Yesterdays", "Ezz-Thetic"

- Lee Konitz - Alto sax
- Miles Davis - Trumpet
- Sal Mosca - Piano
- Billy Bauer - Guitar
- Arnold Fishkin - Bass
- Max Roach - Drums

==== March 13 (NYC) ====
"Indian Summer", "Duet for Saxophone and Guitar"

- Lee Konitz - Alto sax
- Billy Bauer - Guitar

All six Lee Konitz tracks were originally issued on the 10"LP Lee Konitz: The New Sounds (PRLP 116), which is reissued in its entirety here. The tracks with Miles Davis as a sideman were recorded after Davis' first Prestige session, and before Davis' own debut album, also called The New Sounds (PRLP 124). Konitz and Davis had previously worked together on the Birth of the Cool sessions.

==== October 5 (Apex Studios, NYC) ====
"Conception", "My Old Flame"

- Miles Davis - Trumpet
- Sonny Rollins - Tenor sax
- Walter Bishop - Piano
- Tommy Potter - Bass
- Art Blakey - Drums

Both Miles Davis tracks were previously released on Miles Davis: the New Sounds (PRLP 124), Davis' first album. The other two tracks from that album were reissued on Dig (PRLP 7012), and "Conception" and "My Old Flame" have been added as bonus tracks to the later reissues of the Dig CD.
