= Young Man with a Horn (Miles Davis album) =

Studio album by Miles Davis
- Released: March 1953
- Recorded: May 9, 1952
- Studio: WOR, NYC
- Genre: Bebop; hard bop
- Length: 22:21
- Label: Blue Note; BLP 5013
- Producer: Alfred Lion

Miles Davis chronology
The New Sounds (1951)	Young Man with a Horn (1953)	Blue Period (1953)

Professional ratings
Review scores
Source	Rating
The Encyclopedia of Popular Music	3/5 stars

Young Man with a Horn, also known as Miles Davis, Vol. 1, is the second 10-inch LP by American jazz trumpeter Miles Davis, recorded at WOR studios on May 9, 1952 and released on Blue Note the following year.

== Background ==
=== Personal life ===
Young Man with a Horn was recorded on May 9, 1952, during Davis's struggles with heroin addiction. The album was the first of three 10" LPs recorded by Davis for Blue Note during the early 1950s - the others being simply titled Miles Davis, Vol. 2 and Miles Davis, Vol. 3. Davis states in his autobiography that his contract for Prestige Records, for whom he had recorded his first LP the previous year, was non-exclusive, but elsewhere he states the initial Prestige contract was for only one year.

=== Release history ===
All cuts were initially issued as singles except "How Deep Is the Ocean." Young Man with a Horn was also reissued on Vogue in 1954.

The original master takes were split and merged with Davis' two other sessions for Blue Note and re-released on 12 inch LPs Miles Davis, Vols. 1 & 2 in January and February 1956, shortly after Davis won the DownBeat reader's poll for best trumpeter.

== Track listing ==
Side 1
No.	Title	Writer(s)	Length
1.	"Dear Old Stockholm"	Traditional, Stan Getz, arr. by Davis	4:12
2.	"Would'n You"	Dizzy Gillespie	3:22
3.	"Yesterdays"	Jerome Kern, Otto Harbach	3:42

Side 2
No.	Title	Writer(s)	Length
4.	"Chance It" (a.k.a. "Max Is Making Wax")	Oscar Pettiford, credited to Davis	3:05
5.	"Donna" (a.k.a. "Dig")	Miles Davis	3:22
6.	"How Deep Is the Ocean?"	Irving Berlin	4:38
Total length:			22:21

== Personnel ==
- Miles Davis – trumpet
- Jay Jay Johnson – trombone (except "Yesterdays", "How Deep Is the Ocean?")
- Jackie McLean – alto saxophone (except "Yesterdays", "How Deep Is the Ocean?")
- Gil Coggins – piano
- Oscar Pettiford – bass
- Kenny Clarke – drums
