= The New Sounds =

Studio album by Miles Davis
- Released: 1951
- Recorded: October 5, 1951
- Studio: Apex Studio; New York City
- Genre: Jazz
- Length: 23:35
- Label: Prestige; PRLP 124
- Producer: Bob Weinstock

Miles Davis chronology
Modern Jazz Trumpets (1951)	The New Sounds (1951)	Young Man with a Horn (1953)

Professional ratings
Review scores
Source	Rating
AllMusic	3/5 stars
The Encyclopedia of Popular Music	4/5 stars

The New Sounds is the debut solo studio album by the American jazz musician Miles Davis. Released in late 1951 as a 10-inch LP, it is his first album as a bandleader and his first full album for Prestige Records. Davis had previously contributed three tracks to the Prestige compilation LP Modern Jazz Trumpets and appeared as a sideman on the 10-inch LP Lee Konitz: The New Sounds.

== Overview ==
Prestige would be Davis' label for the next five years, with occasional recordings for Blue Note and Debut, until he signed with Columbia in 1955. His previous label, Capitol, had been disappointed with the sales of the nonet recordings released in 1949/50, and they had not offered Davis more work, when he was contacted by Prestige's Bob Weinstock. Weinstock had just started his new jazz specialty record label, and wanted Davis on his label so bad he tracked him across the country, to Chicago where he was performing with Billie Holiday, and offered him a one-year contract.

The four tracks on this album were recorded at New York's Apex Studio on October 5, 1951, along with two tracks ("Bluing" and "Out of the Blue") that would later be used on his next Prestige album, Blue Period, (PRLP 140), and a seventh track, "Denial", which would later appear on the 12"LP Dig (PRLP 7012). Davis' friends Charlie Parker and Charles Mingus both attended this recording session, with Mingus contributing an uncredited bass part to "Conception". Parker watched from the engineering booth, and his presence is said to have unnerved alto saxophonist Jackie McLean, for whom this was his first ever recording session. Sonny Rollins, Davis' favored tenor saxophonist during this period, was again used for this recording session.

Ira Gitler's liner notes stress the advantage of the 10-inch LP in allowing a jazz musician to stretch out. "This album gives Miles more freedom than he has ever had on record for time limits were not strictly enforced. There is opportunity to build ideas into a definite cumulative effect. These ideas sound much more like air-shots than studio recordings." For Davis, this was his first recording to use the new microgroove technology, and he was eager to transcend the 78 rpm format's three-minute limit and stretch out his solos like he could while playing in the clubs. Weinstock assured him he would be one of the first jazz musicians to take advantage of the potential of microgroove technology.

After the 10-inch LP format was discontinued in 1956, the tracks "Dig" and "It's Only A Paper Moon" would reappear on the 12-inch album Dig (PRLP 7012), and "Conception" and "My Old Flame" on the various artists compilation Conception (PRLP 7013).

== Track listing ==
Side one
No.	Title	Writer(s)	Length
1.	"Conception"	George Shearing	4:03
2.	"Dig?"	Miles Davis	7:33

Side two
No.	Title	Writer(s)	Length
3.	"My Old Flame"	Sam Coslow, Arthur Johnston	6:36
4.	"It's Only a Paper Moon"	Harold Arlen, Yip Harburg, Billy Rose	5:23
Total length:			23:35

== Personnel ==
- Miles Davis – trumpet
- Jackie McLean – alto saxophone, tracks 1 & 2
- Sonny Rollins – tenor saxophone
- Walter Bishop, Jr. – piano
- Tommy Potter – double bass
- Art Blakey – drums

== Charts ==
Chart performance for The New Sounds (Remastered 2026)
Chart (2026)	Peak position
US Top Jazz Albums (Billboard)	17
US Top Traditional Jazz Albums (Billboard)	13
