= Dig (Miles Davis album) =

1956 compilation album by Miles Davis

Compilation album by Miles Davis
- Released: January 1956
- Recorded: October 5, 1951
- Studio: Apex (New York City)
- Genre: Jazz
- Length: 34:45 (Original LP Format); 44:00 (CD Reissue)
- Label: Prestige
- Producer: Bob Weinstock

Miles Davis chronology
The Musings of Miles (1955)	Dig (1956)	Miles Davis and Horns (1956)

Professional ratings
Review scores
Source	Rating
AllMusic	3.5/5 stars
The Encyclopedia of Popular Music	4/5 stars
The Penguin Guide to Jazz Recordings	3/4 stars
PopMatters	7/10
The Rolling Stone Jazz Record Guide	5/5 stars

Dig, also reissued as Diggin' with the Miles Davis Sextet, is an album by Miles Davis on Prestige Records, catalogue number 7012. It features tracks from a 1951 session at Apex Studios. First released in the 12-inch LP format in 1956, the original album was later released as Diggin' with the catalogue number PR 7281 and a different cover. Dig was reissued as a compact disc with additional tracks.

After the Birth of the Cool recording sessions in 1949 and 1950, Davis almost immediately turned away from that sound in the early 1950s, instead exploring hard bop. Dig was also the jazz recording debut of saxophonist Jackie McLean, and was one of Sonny Rollins's earliest recordings; both men would go on to become major voices in jazz.

== Release history ==
The material was originally released on two 10-inch LPs, except for "Denial", released on a 1954 7" (Prestige PREP 1361). "Dig" and "It's Only a Paper Moon" first appeared on The New Sounds (PRLP 124), as did "Conception" and "My Old Flame". "Bluing" and "Out of the Blue" were originally released on Blue Period (PRLP 140). When the material was reconfigured for the new 12-inch format, "Conception" and "My Old Flame" were included on the Prestige various artists collection Conception (PRLP 7013).

== Track listing ==
=== 12" LP ===
Side one
No.	Title	Writer(s)	Length
1.	"Dig"	Miles Davis	7:33
2.	"It's Only a Paper Moon"	Harold Arlen, Yip Harburg, Billy Rose	5:23
3.	"Denial"	Miles Davis	5:39

Side two
No.	Title	Writer(s)	Length
1.	"Bluing"	Miles Davis	9:55
2.	"Out of the Blue"	Miles Davis	6:15
Total length:			34:45

=== CD ===
No.	Title	Writer(s)	Length
1.	"Dig"	Miles Davis	7:33
2.	"It's Only a Paper Moon"	Harold Arlen, Yip Harburg, Billy Rose	5:23
3.	"Denial"	Miles Davis	5:39
4.	"Bluing"	Miles Davis	9:55
5.	"Out of the Blue"	Miles Davis	6:15
6.	"My Old Flame"	Sam Coslow	6:34
7.	"Conception"	George Shearing	4:01
Total length:			45:20

== Personnel ==
- Miles Davis – trumpet
- Jackie McLean – alto saxophone (1, 3–5)
- Sonny Rollins – tenor saxophone
- Walter Bishop, Jr. – piano
- Tommy Potter – double bass
- Art Blakey – drums
