= The Talented Mr. Ripley (disambiguation) =

The Talented Mr. Ripley is a 1955 novel by Patricia Highsmith.

The Talented Mr. Ripley may also refer to:

- The Talented Mr. Ripley (film), a 1999 American psychological thriller film
- The Talented Mr. Ripley (soundtrack) a 1999 soundtrack album by Gabriel Yared
