= The Columbia Years 1955–1985 =

Box set by Miles Davis
- Released: 1988
- Recorded: 1955–1985
- Genre: Jazz
- Label: Columbia
- Producer: Various

Miles Davis box set chronology
The Miles Davis Collection, Vol. 1: 12 Sides of Miles (1981)	The Columbia Years 1955–1985 (1988)	Great Sessions (2006)

Professional ratings
Review scores
Source	Rating
AllMusic	2.5/5 stars

The Columbia Years 1955–1985 is a 4-CD Miles Davis compilation. The box set is furthermore split up into the sections of blues, standards, originals, moods and electric. These cover tracks 1–8 of the first disc, tracks 9–10 and tracks 1–3 from the second disc, tracks 4–7 on the second disc and tracks 1–2 on the third disc, tracks 3–9 on the third disc, and the final disc, respectively.

== Track listing ==
=== Disc 1 ===
1. "Générique"
2. "All Blues"
3. "Eighty-One"
4. "Blues For Pablo"
5. "Summertime"
6. "Straight, No Chaser"
7. "Footprints" (Digital Remix)
8. "Florence Sur Les Champs Élysées"
9. "I Thought About You"
10. "Someday My Prince Will Come" (Alternate Take) (Digital Remix)

Tracks 1,3,8 and 9 are mono recordings. Track 9 is previously unreleased. The version of Straight, No Chaser is from the recording Miles And Monk At Newport.

=== Disc 2 ===
1. "Bye Bye Blackbird"
2. "My Funny Valentine" (Digital Remix)
3. "Love for Sale" (Digital Remix)
4. "Budo"
5. "Milestones"
6. "Filles De Kilimanjaro"
7. "Fran-Dance" (Digital Remix)
8. "Seven Steps to Heaven"

Track 4 is a mono recording.

=== Disc 3 ===
1. "Flamenco Sketches"
2. "So What"
3. "Water babies"
4. "Saeta"
5. "Masqualero"
6. "Pinocchio" (Digital Remix)
7. "Summer Night" (Digital Remix)
8. "Fall"
9. "It's About That Time"

Track 2 is a mono recording.

=== Disc 4 ===
1. "Sivad (Excerpt)"
2. "What It Is"
3. "Ms. Morrisine"
4. "Shout"
5. "Honky Tonk"
6. "Star On Cicely"
7. "Thinkin' One Thing And Doin' Another"
8. "Miles Runs The Voodoo Down"
