= The Miles Davis Collection, Vol. 1: 12 Sides of Miles =

Box set by Miles Davis
- Released: 1981
- Genre: Jazz music
- Length: 261:07
- Label: Columbia

Miles Davis box set chronology
Chronicle: The Complete Prestige Recordings (1980)	The Miles Davis Collection, Vol. 1: 12 Sides of Miles (1981)	The Columbia Years 1955–1985 (1988)

The Miles Davis Collection, Vol. 1: 12 Sides of Miles is a 6×LP box set by American jazz trumpeter Miles Davis, released in 1981 by Columbia.

== Track listing ==
=== Sketches of Spain ===
==== Side 1 ====
1. "Concierto de Aranjuez" – 16:19
2. "Will o' the Wisp" – 3:50

==== Side 2 ====
1. "The Pan Piper" – 3:53
2. "Saeta" – 5:08
3. "Solea" – 12:14

=== Miles Ahead ===
==== Side 3 ====
1. "Springsville" – 3:24
2. "The Maids of Cadiz" – 4:01
3. "The Duke" – 3:33
4. "My Ship" – 4:20
5. "Miles Ahead" – 3:32

==== Side 4 ====
1. "Blues for Pablo" – 5:15
2. "New Rhumba" – 4:44
3. "The Meaning of the Blues" – 2:40
4. "Lament" – 2:23
5. "I Don't Wanna Be Kissed (by Anyone but You)" – 3:04

=== Porgy and Bess ===
==== Side 5 ====
1. "Buzzard Song" – 4:04
2. "Bess, You Is My Woman Now" – 5:09
3. "Gone" – 3:37
4. "Gone, Gone, Gone" – 2:01
5. "Summertime" – 3:13
6. "Oh Bess, Oh Where's My Bess" – 4:27

==== Side 6 ====
1. "Prayer (Oh Doctor Jesus)" – 4:36
2. "Fisherman, Strawberry and Devil Crab" – 4:00
3. "My Man's Gone Now" – 6:17
4. "It Ain't Necessarily So" – 4:22
5. "Here Come De Honey Man" – 1:17
6. "I Loves You, Porgy" – 3:34
7. "There's a Boat That's Leaving Soon for New York" – 3:24

=== Kind of Blue ===
==== Side 7 ====
1. "So What" – 8:55
2. "Freddie Freeloader" – 9:30
3. "Blue in Green" – 5:25

==== Side 8 ====
1. "All Blues" – 11:35
2. "Flamenco Sketches" – 9:25

=== Bitches Brew ===
==== Side 9 ====
1. "Pharaoh's Dance" – 20:07

==== Side 10 ====
1. "Bitches Brew" – 27:00

==== Side 11 ====
1. "Spanish Key" – 17:30
2. "John Mclaughlin" – 4:23

==== Side 12 ====
1. "Miles Runs the Voodoo Down" – 14:03
2. "Sanctuary" – 10:54

== Charts ==
Chart	Peak position
US Billboard Top Jazz Albums	33
