= Tom Dowd =

American recording engineer and producer (1925–2002)

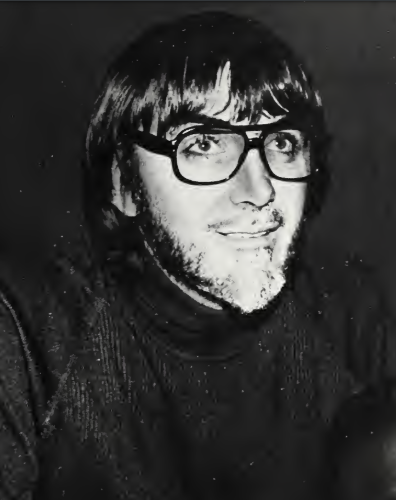
- Dowd in 1976

Background information
- Born: Thomas John Dowd; October 20, 1925; Manhattan, New York, U.S.
- Died: October 27, 2002 (aged 77) Aventura, Florida, U.S.
- Occupations: Audio engineer; record producer
- Years active: 1947–2002
- Labels: Atlantic; Apex; Criteria

Thomas John Dowd (October 20, 1925 – October 27, 2002) was an American recording engineer and producer for Atlantic Records. He was credited with innovating the multitrack recording method. Dowd worked on a veritable "who's who" of recordings that encompassed blues, jazz, pop, rock, and soul records.

== Career ==
=== Early years ===
Dowd was born in Manhattan, New York City, and grew up playing piano, tuba, violin, and string bass. His mother was an opera singer and his father was a concertmaster.

Dowd graduated from Stuyvesant High School in June 1942 at the age of 16. He continued his musical education at City College of New York. Dowd also played in a band at New York's Columbia University, where he became a conductor. He was also employed at the physics laboratory of Columbia University.

=== Military work ===
At age 18, Dowd was drafted into the military with the rank of sergeant. He continued his work in physics at Columbia University. He worked on the Manhattan Project, which developed the atomic bomb. The purpose of the work was unclear until 1945. Dowd planned to obtain a degree in nuclear physics when he completed his work on the Manhattan Project. However, because his work was top secret, the university did not recognize it, and Dowd decided not to continue, since the university's curriculum would not have been able to further his physics education. His research for the military was more advanced than academic courses at that time.

=== Music ===
Dowd took a job at a classical music recording studio until he obtained employment at Atlantic Records. His first hit was Eileen Barton's chart-topping 1950 recording of "If I Knew You Were Comin' I'd've Baked a Cake". He soon became a top recording engineer there and recorded popular artists such as Ray Charles, the Drifters, the Coasters, The Spinners, Ruth Brown and Bobby Darin, including Darin's rendition of Kurt Weill/Bertolt Brecht's "Mack the Knife". He captured jazz performances by John Coltrane, Ornette Coleman, Thelonious Monk and Charlie Parker. It was Dowd's idea to cut Ray Charles' recording of "What'd I Say" into two parts and release them as the A-side and B-side of the same single record.

Dowd worked as an engineer and producer from the 1940s until the beginning of the 21st century. He recorded albums by many artists including Eddie Money, the Bee Gees, Eric Clapton, Lynyrd Skynyrd, Black Oak Arkansas, Derek and the Dominos, Rod Stewart, Wishbone Ash, New Model Army, Cream, Lulu, Chicago, the Allman Brothers Band, Joe Bonamassa, the J. Geils Band, Meat Loaf, Sonny & Cher, the Rascals, The Spinners, Willie Nelson, Diana Ross, Eagles, the Four Seasons, Kenny Loggins, James Gang, Dusty Springfield, Eddie Harris, Charles Mingus, Herbie Mann, Booker T. & the M.G.'s, Otis Redding, Aretha Franklin, Ronnie Earl, Joe Castro and Primal Scream. He was also an employee of Apex Studios in the 1950s. Dowd received a Grammy Trustees Award for his lifetime achievements in February 2002.

He died of emphysema on October 27, 2002, in Florida, where he had been living and working at Criteria Studios for many years, a week after his 77th birthday.

== Legacy ==
Dowd helped to shape the artists that he worked with and was highly influential in creating the sound of the second half of the 20th century. He encouraged Jerry Wexler of Atlantic Records to install an Ampex eight-track recorder, enabling Atlantic to be the first recording company to record using multiple tracks.

Dowd is credited as the engineer who popularized the eight-track recording system for commercial music and popularized the use of stereophonic sound. He also pioneered the use of linear channel faders as opposed to rotary controls on audio mixers. He devised various methods for altering sound after the initial recording. In 2003, director Mark Moormann premiered an award-winning documentary about his life entitled Tom Dowd and the Language of Music. In the 2004 biopic about musician Ray Charles, Ray, Tom Dowd was portrayed by actor Rick Gomez.

Dowd was posthumously inducted into the Rock and Roll Hall of Fame in 2012.

== Discography ==
=== Singles ===
- Derek and the Dominos – "Layla"
