= Walkin' =

Compilation album by Miles Davis
- Released: March 1957
- Recorded: April 3, 1954 (#3–5); April 29, 1954 (#1–2)
- Studio: Van Gelder (Hackensack)
- Genres: Jazz, hard bop
- Length: 37:43
- Labels: Prestige; PRLP 7076
- Producer: Bob Weinstock

Miles Davis chronology
'Round About Midnight (1957)	Walkin' (1957)	Cookin' with the Miles Davis Quintet (1957)

Professional ratings
Review scores
Source	Rating
AllMusic	4.5/5 stars
The Penguin Guide to Jazz Recordings	4/4 stars

Walkin' (PRLP 7076) is a Miles Davis compilation album released in March 1957 by Prestige Records. The album compiles material previously released on two 10 inch LPs in 1954, including all of Miles Davis All-Star Sextet and most of Miles Davis Quintet. Here credited to the "Miles Davis All-Stars", the songs were recorded on April 3 and 29, 1954, by two slightly different groups led by Davis. Both sessions were recorded at Rudy Van Gelder's home studio.

== History ==
The April 3 session was a quintet with David Schildkraut on alto saxophone, which produced the three tracks on side two. Schildkraut, the only one of Miles' "all stars" not credited on the cover of the original release, was a frequent sideman and soloist with the bands of Stan Kenton, Pete Rugulo, Johnny Richards, and Ralph Burns. Two of these tracks were originally released on the 10-inch LP Miles Davis Quintet, Prestige PRLP 185. The earlier release also included "I'll Remember April", recorded at the same time, now found on the Prestige album Blue Haze (PRLP 7054). Another tune from this session, "Love Me or Leave Me", was previously unreleased and substituted here for "I'll Remember April". In the 2001 documentary The Miles Davis Story, Weinstock stated that Walkin' was his favorite record that he produced.

The April 29 session, which makes up all of side one, was a sextet with J. J. Johnson on trombone and Lucky Thompson on tenor saxophone. The rhythm section was identical to the earlier session. These two tracks were originally issued on the 10" LP Miles Davis All-Star Sextet PRLP 182. The album's title track, a staple of Davis's live set for many years, was key to the emerging hard bop approach developed in the mid-1950s, Davis providing it with an anthem. The composition has been attributed by various sources to Jimmy Mundy, Gene Ammons and Davis himself. The copyright registration lists businessman and artist manager Richard Carpenter as the composer. Carpenter had professional relationships with Mundy and Tadd Dameron, but was not known to be a musician or composer.

"Solar" was attributed to Davis and copyrighted in his name in 1963. Evidence revealed in 2012 showed that it is nearly identical to "Sonny", a piece written by guitarist Chuck Wayne in the 1940s, so Wayne is regarded as the composer of "Solar".

== Track listing ==
=== Side one ===
No.	Title	Writer(s)	Length
1.	"Walkin' (Gravy)"	Jimmy Mundy, Richard Carpenter	13:26
2.	"Blue 'n' Boogie"	Dizzy Gillespie, Frank Paparelli	8:16

=== Side two ===
No.	Title	Writer(s)	Length
1.	"Solar (Sonny)"	Chuck Wayne, Miles Davis	4:44
2.	"You Don't Know What Love Is"	Don Raye, Gene de Paul	4:23
3.	"Love Me or Leave Me"	Gus Kahn, Walter Donaldson	6:54

== Personnel ==
- Miles Davis – trumpet
- Lucky Thompson – tenor saxophone on side one
- J. J. Johnson – trombone on side one
- David Schildkraut – alto saxophone on side two
- Horace Silver – piano
- Percy Heath – bass
- Kenny Clarke – drums

== Charts ==
Chart performance for "Walkin'"
Chart (2025)	Peak position
Greek Albums (IFPI)	61
