= Sonny Rollins with the Modern Jazz Quartet =

1956 compilation album by Sonny Rollins

Compilation album by Sonny Rollins
- Released: 1956
- Recorded: January 17, 1951 (13); December 17, 1951 (5–12); October 7, 1953 (1–4)
- Studio: Apex Studios, New York City
- Genre: Jazz
- Length: 37:19
- Label: Prestige
- Producer: Bob Weinstock

Sonny Rollins chronology
Sonny Rollins with the Modern Jazz Quartet (1956)	Moving Out (1954)

Sonny Rollins Quartet 10"LP

Sonny Rollins with the Modern Jazz Quartet (also released as Sonny & the Stars) is a 1956 compilation album by jazz saxophonist Sonny Rollins, featuring his earliest recordings for the Prestige label under his leadership, including four tracks performed by Rollins with the Modern Jazz Quartet (John Lewis, Milt Jackson, Percy Heath, and Kenny Clarke), eight tracks where Kenny Drew and Art Blakey replace Lewis, Jackson, and Clarke, and one track with Miles Davis on piano.

The first four tracks, featuring the members of the Modern Jazz Quartet, had been previously released as the 7-inch 45 rpm EP Sonny Rollins With Modern Jazz Quartet (PREP 1337). Tracks 5–11 and 13 were featured on the Prestige 10 inch LP Sonny Rollins Quartet (1952)(PRLP 137), which is reissued in its entirety here. Track 12 was released on the 10" compilation Mambo Jazz (PRLP 135).

"I Know", featuring Miles Davis on piano, was recorded at the same session as four other tracks under Davis's name, using the same musicians, including the young Rollins. This was Davis's first recording session for Prestige Records and his first with Rollins. Producer Bob Weinstock tried to dissuade Davis from using Rollins, feeling he was not ready, but Davis persuaded Weinstock to let Rollins record a cut under his own name. The Davis tracks recorded that date were issued on the 10-inch LP Modern Jazz Trumpets and appeared on the album Miles Davis and Horns.

== Reception ==
Professional ratings
Review scores
Source	Rating
AllMusic	4/5 stars
The Penguin Guide to Jazz Recordings	3.5/4 stars
The Rolling Stone Jazz Record Guide	4/5 stars

The AllMusic review by Lindsay Planer describes the album as a "fresh and vibrant baker's dozen of selections... a vital component in any jazz enthusiast's collection." Author and musician Peter Niklas Wilson called it "patchwork, but an interesting one".

== Track listing ==
All compositions by Sonny Rollins except where noted.

1. "The Stopper" – 2:59
2. "Almost Like Being in Love" (Alan Jay Lerner, Frederick Loewe) – 3:26
3. "No Moe" – 3:32
4. "In a Sentimental Mood" (Duke Ellington, Manny Kurtz, Irving Mills) – 3:20
5. "Scoops" – 2:16
6. "With a Song in My Heart" (Lorenz Hart, Richard Rodgers) – 3:08
7. "Newk's Fadeaway" – 3:15
8. "Time on My Hands" (Harold Adamson, Mack Gordon, Vincent Youmans) – 2:42
9. "This Love of Mine" (Sol Parker, Henry W. Sanicola Jr., Frank Sinatra) – 2:26
10. "Shadrack" (Robert MacGimsey) – 2:35
11. "On a Slow Boat to China" (Frank Loesser) – 2:41
12. "Mambo Bounce" – 2:25
13. "I Know" (Miles Davis) – 2:32

== Personnel ==
Tracks 1–4

- Sonny Rollins – tenor saxophone
- John Lewis – piano
- Milt Jackson – vibes
- Percy Heath – bass
- Kenny Clarke – drums

Tracks 5–12

- Sonny Rollins – tenor saxophone
- Kenny Drew – piano
- Percy Heath – bass
- Art Blakey – drums

Track 13

- Sonny Rollins – tenor saxophone
- Miles Davis – piano
- Percy Heath – bass
- Roy Haynes – drums
