= Bob Parent (photographer) =

Canadian photographer (1923–1987)

Bob Parent (1923–1987) was a Canadian-born photographer who specialized in photographing the Jazz musicians of New York City. His photographs often appeared in Life, DownBeat and Metronome magazines, in books and album covers. One of his photos, a picture of the Thelonious Monk Trio accompanied by Charlie Parker, has been called the "greatest photo in Jazz history" by The New York Times. The picture features Monk, Roy Haynes, Charles Mingus and Charlie Parker at the Open Door, a now defunct Jazz club in Greenwich Village. Parent also designed LP jackets for independent recording companies, such as Miles Davis' Conception for Prestige. During the 1960s, Parent turned to social and political photojournalism. He died from a brain tumor in 1987.

== See also ==
- List of notable brain tumor patients
