= Woody 'n' You =

1942 jazz standard by Dizzy Gillespie

Composition by Dizzy Gillespie
- Written: 1942
- Recorded: 1944
- Genre: Jazz
- Songwriter: Dizzy Gillespie

"Woody 'n' You" is a 1942 jazz standard written by Dizzy Gillespie as an homage to Woody Herman. It was one of three arrangements Gillespie made for Herman's big band, although it was not used at the time; the other two were "Swing Shift" and "Down Under". It was introduced on record in 1944 by Coleman Hawkins initiated by Budd Johnson, Hawkins's musical director of his 12-man orchestra that included the bebop pioneers Oscar Pettiford, Max Roach, and Gillespie. (These sessions would later be released on the compilation album Rainbow Mist in 1992). The song is also called "Algo Bueno".

== Structure ==
The 32-bar composition is in AABA form. The 'A' section "consists of three two-measure sequences on ii-V chords, ending on the tonic (D♭)": Gm^{7(♭5)} – C^{7(♯9)} – Fm^{7(♭5)} – B^{♭7(♯9)} – E^{♭}m^{7(♭5)} – A^{♭7(♯9)} – D^{♭}maj^{9}.

== Covers ==
- Miles Davis recorded the song three times: on Miles Davis Volume 1, Relaxin' with the Miles Davis Quintet, and the rare Amsterdam Concert.
- Sonny Rollins played the song on his A Night at the "Village Vanguard" live album in 1958.
- Charles Mingus on his 1959 album A Modern Jazz Symposium of Music and Poetry
- Stan Getz on Getz at the Gate in 1961

== See also ==
- List of jazz standards
