= Blue 'n' Boogie =

Jazz composition by Dizzy Gillespie and Frank Paparelli

"Blue 'n' Boogie" is a 1944 jazz standard. It was written by Dizzy Gillespie and Frank Paparelli. It can be found on Gillespie's 1955 compilation album Groovin' High.

== Other notable recordings ==
*Trumpeter Miles Davis on Miles Davis All-Star Sextet (1954; later released as the first side of Walkin'),

*Guitarist Wes Montgomery on Full House (1962)

*Sonny Rollins on Now's the Time (1964).

== See also ==
- List of jazz standards
