= Miles Davis Quintet (album) =

Studio album by Miles Davis
- Released: 1954
- Recorded: April 3, 1954
- Studio: Van Gelder (Hackensack)
- Genre: Jazz
- Length: 17:02
- Label: Prestige
- Producer: Bob Weinstock

Miles Davis chronology
Classics in Jazz: Miles Davis (1954)	Miles Davis Quintet (1954)	Miles Davis with Sonny Rollins (1954)

Miles Davis Quintet (PRLP 185) is a 10 inch LP album by Miles Davis, released in 1954 by Prestige Records. The album title is not to be confused with either of Davis' later Great Quintets. The three tracks on this LP, and one other, were recorded at Rudy Van Gelder's Studio, Hackensack, New Jersey, on April 3, 1954. This was the first session for Prestige Davis recorded at Gelder's home studio, as he would all his remaining sessions for the label.

After the 10" LP format was discontinued, tracks 1 & 2 were included on Side 2 of the 12" album Walkin' (PRLP 7076), and track 3 was reissued on the 12" album Blue Haze (PRLP 7054). A fourth song from the same session, "Love Me or Leave Me", was also included on Walkin'.

== Track listing ==
Side one
No.	Title	Writer(s)	Length
1.	"Solar"	Miles Davis	4:44
2.	"You Don't Know What Love Is"	Gene de Paul, Don Raye	4:23

Side two
No.	Title	Writer(s)	Length
1.	"I'll Remember April"	Gene de Paul, Don Raye, Patricia Johnston	7:55
Total length:			17:02

== Personnel ==
- Miles Davis – trumpet
- Dave Schildkraut – alto saxophone (1 & 3)
- Horace Silver – piano
- Percy Heath – bass
- Kenny Clarke – drums
