= The Talented Mr. Ripley (soundtrack) =

Soundtrack album by Gabriel Yared
- Released: 1999
- Recorded: 1999
- Genre: Film soundtrack
- Length: 63:48

Gabriel Yared chronology
Message in a Bottle (1999)	The Talented Mr. Ripley (1999)	Autumn in New York (2000)

Professional ratings
Review scores
Source	Rating
Soundtrack.net	4/5 stars

The Talented Mr. Ripley is the soundtrack of the 1999 film The Talented Mr. Ripley starring Matt Damon, Gwyneth Paltrow, Jude Law and Cate Blanchett. The original score was composed by Gabriel Yared.

The album was nominated for the Academy Award for Best Original Score (lost to the score of Le violon rouge), the Golden Globe Award for Best Original Score (lost to the score of La leggenda del pianista sull'oceano) and the BAFTA Award for Best Film Music (lost to the score of American Beauty).

== Track listing ==
1. "Tu Vuo' Fa L'Americano" – 3:02
2. "My Funny Valentine" – 2:35
3. "Italia" – 1:40
4. "Lullaby for Cain" – 3:32
5. "Crazy Tom" – 4:47
6. "Ko-Ko" – 2:54
7. "Nature Boy" – 4:48
8. "Mischief" – 2:26
9. "Ripley" – 3:30
10. "Pent-Up House" – 2:40
11. "Guaglione" – 3:17
12. "Moanin'" – 4:16
13. "Proust" – 1:59
14. "Four" – 3:41
15. "Promise" – 2:49
16. "The Champ" – 2:45
17. "Syncopes" – 4:49
18. "Stabat Mater" – 2:56
19. "You Don't Know What Love Is" – 5:22
