= Miles Davis All Star Sextet =

Studio album by Miles Davis
- Released: 1954
- Recorded: April 29, 1954
- Studio: Van Gelder (Hackensack)
- Genre: Jazz
- Length: 21:38
- Label: Prestige
- Producer: Bob Weinstock

Miles Davis chronology
Miles Davis Quartet (1954)	Miles Davis All Star Sextet (1954)	Classics in Jazz: Miles Davis (1954)

Miles Davis All Star Sextet (PRLP 182) is a 10 inch LP album by Miles Davis, released in 1954 by Prestige Records. The two side-long tracks were recorded at Rudy Van Gelder's Studio, Hackensack, New Jersey, April 29, 1954.

Davis claimed in his autobiography that the release of this material turned his "whole life and career around", along with Capitol Records' release around the same time of the Birth of the Cool tracks in LP form, which made the critics notice him once again. Davis goes on to describe the goal of this recording: to return to "the fire and improvisation of bebop", but combined with a more forward looking funky kind of blues. Davis says the concepts were worked out in Horace Silver's room at the Arlington Hotel. J.J. Johnson and Lucky Thompson provided a big horn sound, on top of Silver's funky piano and Clarke’s "bad rhythms" behind on the drums. When the recording was complete, all involved, including Bob Weinstock and Van Gelder, knew they had achieved something good.

After the 10" LP format was discontinued, both tracks were included on Side 1 of the 12" album Walkin' (PRLP 7076).

== Track listing ==
Side one
No.	Title	Writer(s)	Length
1.	"Blue 'n' Boogie"	Dizzy Gillespie, Frank Paparelli	8:16

Side two
No.	Title	Writer(s)	Length
1.	"Walkin'"	Richard Carpenter	13:26
Total length:			21:38

== Personnel ==
- Miles Davis – trumpet
- J.J. Johnson – trombone
- Lucky Thompson – tenor saxophone
- Horace Silver – piano
- Percy Heath – bass
- Kenny Clarke – drums
