= Dig (composition) =

Jazz standard attributed to Miles Davis

"Dig" is a bebop jazz standard attributed to Miles Davis by Prestige Records without Davis' knowledge. It was recorded on October 5, 1951 and first released on his album The New Sounds.

Its chord sequence is almost identical to that of "Sweet Georgia Brown" by Ben Bernie and Maceo Pinkard, making it a contrafact. Davis' second recording of the tune on May 9 the following year, this time for Blue Note, was called "Donna" and credited to Jackie McLean, the original composer, who played alto saxophone on both sessions (Young Man with a Horn and Miles Davis Volume 1).

"Dig" has also been played by numerous other artists such as Sonny Rollins, Woody Herman, Donald Byrd, Archie Shepp, Joey DeFrancesco, and Fred Firth.

== See also ==
- List of jazz contrafacts
