= Miles Davis, Vol. 3 =

Studio album by Miles Davis
- Released: 1954
- Recorded: March 6, 1954
- Studio: Van Gelder; Hackensack, New Jersey
- Genre: Jazz; bebop; hard bop
- Length: 26:13
- Label: Blue Note
- Producer: Alfred Lion

Miles Davis chronology
| Miles Davis Volume 2 (1953) | Miles Davis, Vol. 3 (1954) | Miles Davis Quartet (1954) |

Professional ratings
Review scores
| Source | Rating |
|---|---|
| AllMusic | 4.5/5 stars |
| The Encyclopedia of Popular Music | 3/5 stars |

Miles Davis, Vol. 3 (BLP 5040) is the sixth 10" studio album by musician Miles Davis, recorded on March 6, 1954, and released by Blue Note later that year, the third and last of his three ten-inches published for the label. Davis would once again record at Blue Note, but as a sideman on Cannonball Adderley's Somethin' Else (BLP 1595), several years later.

The six tracks were recorded at Rudy Van Gelder's Studio, Hackensack, New Jersey, on March 6, 1954, the third and last of three annual sessions. For the session he used exactly the same quartet he would again record with seven days later for side 2 of the Miles Davis Quartet LP (PRLP 161), released by Prestige. Davis says in his autobiography that these were his first recording sessions after successfully quitting his heroin habit, and that he arranged them both quickly as he needed money fast, and both Blue Note's Alfred Lion and Prestige's Bob Weinstock had given him a fair chance earlier when his reputation was in decline. This was also the first of several sessions Davis would record with the young Horace Silver, whom he liked for his funky style of playing.

After the 10" LP format was discontinued, the tracks would all reappear on the 12" album version of Miles Davis Volume 2 (BLP 1502), alongside tracks from Davis' first two Blue Note sessions. In the CD era all six tracks would be reassigned to the CD version of Miles Davis Volume 1.

== Track listing ==
Side one
| No. | Title | Writer(s) | Length |
|---|---|---|---|
| 1. | "Take Off" | Miles Davis | 3:39 |
| 2. | "It Never Entered My Mind" | Richard Rodgers, Lorenz Hart | 4:00 |
| 3. | "Well, You Needn't" | Thelonious Monk | 5:21 |

Side two
| No. | Title | Writer(s) | Length |
|---|---|---|---|
| 1. | "Lazy Susan" | Miles Davis | 4:01 |
| 2. | "Weirdo" | Miles Davis | 4:42 |
| 3. | "The Leap" | Miles Davis | 4:30 |
| Total length: | | | 26:13 |

== Personnel ==
- Miles Davis – trumpet
- Horace Silver – piano
- Percy Heath – bass
- Art Blakey – drums
