= Blue Period (album) =

Studio album by Miles Davis
- Released: 1953
- Recorded: January 17 and October 5, 1951
- Studio: Apex Studio, New York City
- Genre: Jazz
- Length: 18:53
- Label: Prestige
- Producer: Bob Weinstock

Miles Davis chronology
Young Man with a Horn (1953)	Blue Period (1953)	The Compositions of Al Cohn (1953)

Professional ratings
Review scores
Source	Rating
AllMusic	3/5 stars
The Encyclopedia of Popular Music	3/5 stars

Blue Period is the third studio album by jazz musician Miles Davis. It was released in 1953 as a 10" LP, his second released by Prestige Records, recorded over the course of two 1951 recording sessions at New York's Apex Studio.

== Background ==
"Bluing" and "Out of the Blue", two Davis compositions, were recorded on October 5, 1951, at the same session as the material for his first album The New Sounds (PRLP 124). "Blue Room", composed by Rodgers and Hart, was recorded earlier that year, at the same January 17 recording session as the three tracks used on the various artists LP Modern Jazz Trumpets (PRLP 113). This earlier session was Davis' first for Prestige.

The tracks on Blue Period were split when Prestige reconfigured its recordings for 12-inch LP. "Bluing" and "Out of the Blue" are featured on Dig (PRLP 7012), and two versions of "Blue Room" (including an alternate take) are on the CD of Miles Davis and Horns (originally PRLP 7025).

== Track listing ==
Side one
No.	Title	Writer(s)	Length
1.	"Bluing"	Miles Davis	9:55

Side two
No.	Title	Writer(s)	Length
2.	"Blue Room"	Rodgers and Hart	2:48
3.	"Out of the Blue"	Miles Davis	6:15
Total length:			18:53

== Personnel ==
On "Bluing" and "Out of the Blue"

- Miles Davis – trumpet
- Jackie McLean – alto saxophone
- Sonny Rollins – tenor saxophone
- Walter Bishop, Jr. – piano
- Tommy Potter – double bass
- Art Blakey – drums

On "Blue Room"

- Miles Davis – trumpet
- Sonny Rollins – tenor saxophone
- John Lewis – piano
- Percy Heath – double bass
- Roy Haynes – drums
