= Four (composition) =

Composition by Miles Davis

from the album Blue Haze
- Released: 1954
- Recorded: March 15 and April 3, 1954
- Genre: Jazz
- Length: 4:03
- Label: Prestige
- Composer: Miles Davis
- Producers: Bob Weinstock, Ira Gitler

"Four" is a 1954 jazz standard. It was first recorded and arranged in 1954 by jazz trumpeter Miles Davis and released on his album Miles Davis Quartet. It is a 32-bar ABAC form.

The song composition officially credits Davis as the writer. However, there is some controversy that it may have actually been composed by someone and purchased by Davis. The American jazz saxophonist Eddie "Cleanhead" Vinson claimed ownership for the song.

== Personnel ==
- Miles Davis – trumpet
- Horace Silver – piano
- Percy Heath – double bass
- Art Blakey – drums

== Recordings ==
The following artists have recorded this composition.

- Miles Davis – Miles Davis Quartet (1954)
- Stan Getz – West Coast Jazz (1955)
- Miles Davis – Workin' with the Miles Davis Quintet (1956)
- Gene Ammons – Jammin' in Hi Fi with Gene Ammons (1957)
- Lambert, Hendricks & Ross – The Swingers (1958)
- Anita O'Day – Anita O'Day Sings the Winners (1958)
- Cecil Taylor Quartet w/ Albert Ayler - Holy Ghost: Rare & Unissued Recordings (1962–70) (Recorded 1962 and released in 2004)
- Phineas Newborn – The Great Jazz Piano of Phineas Newborn Jr. (1962)
- Maynard Ferguson - Maynard '62 (1962)
- Sonny Rollins – Sonny Rollins & Co 1964 (1964)
- Miles Davis – Four & More (1966)
- Joe Henderson – Four (1968)
- Red Garland - Red Garland Revisited! (1969)
- Dexter Gordon - Bouncin' with Dex (1976)
- Harry Sweets Edison – Just Friends: Live at Bubba's Jazz Restaurant (1981)
- Chet Baker – Chet Baker in Tokyo (1987)
- Sam Jones – Right Down Front: The Riverside Collection (1988)
- Mulgrew Miller – From Day to Day (1990)
- Madeline Eastman – Mad About Madeline! (1991)
- Terry Edwards - Executes Miles Davis Numbers (1992)
- Ron Affif – Vierd Blues (1993)
- Guy Barker – The Talented Mr Ripley - OST (with Pete King, Iain Dixon, Robin Aspland, Arne Somogyi and Clark Tracey) (1999)
- Anita O'Day – Complete Anita O'Day Clef/Verve Sessions (2000)
- Keith Jarrett – My Foolish Heart (2007)
- Michael Mayo - Fly (2024)

== "The Swingers" LP ==
- Lambert, Hendricks & Ross use Davis's solo on their 1958 album "The Swingers" which caused some conflict between Hendricks and Davis.
