= Modern Jazz Trumpets =

Compilation album by Fats Navarro, Dizzy Gillespie, Miles Davis, Kenny Dorham
- Released: 1951
- Recorded: May 15, 1949; September 20, 1949; September 16, 1950; January 17, 1951
- Genre: Jazz
- Label: Prestige
- Producer: Bob Weinstock

Fats Navarro chronology
Modern Jazz Trumpets (1951)	Fats Bud-Klook-Sonny-Kinney (1955)

Miles Davis 10" LP chronology
Modern Jazz Trumpets (1951)	The New Sounds (1951)

later version of cover

Modern Jazz Trumpets is an album released by Prestige Records in 1951 with music by four jazz trumpeters: Fats Navarro, Dizzy Gillespie, Miles Davis and Kenny Dorham. The album was released on the 10" LP format and includes the first recordings by Davis for Prestige.

Cover art was a text layout similar to other early albums on Prestige. Later pressings used the same photo of Davis also used on his first three 10" LPs.

== Track listing ==
A side

1. Fats Navarro – "Stop" (Don Lanphere) – 4:03
2. Fats Navarro – "Go" (Lanphere) – 4:03
3. Fats Navarro – "Wailing Wall" (Lanphere) – 3:25
4. Dizzy Gillespie – "Thinking of You" (Bert Kalmar, Harry Ruby) – 2:45

B side

1. Miles Davis – "Morpheus" (John Lewis) – 2:21
2. Miles Davis – "Whispering" (M. Schonberger, R. Coburn, V. Rose) – 3:03
3. Miles Davis – "Down" (Davis) – 2:51
4. Dizzy Gillespie – "Nice Work If You Can Get It" (George Gershwin, Ira Gershwin) – 2:45
5. Kenny Dorham – "Maxology" (Dorham) – 5:44

== Personnel and recording dates ==
=== May 15, 1949 ("Maxology") ===
- Kenny Dorham – trumpet
- James Moody – tenor saxophone
- Al Haig – piano
- Tommy Potter – bass
- Max Roach – drums

Studio Technisonor, Paris, France

The Kenny Dorham track was also issued by Prestige on the following 78 rpm single, credited to James Moody:

- Prestige 702: James Moody - Maxology, Part 1&2

=== September 20, 1949 ("Stop," "Go" & "Wailing Wall") ===
- Fats Navarro – trumpet
- Don Lanphere – tenor saxophone
- Al Haig – piano
- Tommy Potter – bass
- Max Roach – drums

NYC

The Fats Navarro tracks were also issued by Prestige on the following 78 rpm singles:

- Prestige 812: Fats Navarro - Stop / Go
- Prestige 819: Fats Navarro - Wailing Wall / Infatuation

=== September 16, 1950 ("Thinking of You" & "Nice Work If You Can Get It") ===
- Dizzy Gillespie – trumpet
- Jimmy Heath – alto saxophone
- Jimmy Oliver – tenor saxophone
- Milt Jackson - piano
- Percy Heath – bass
- Joe Harris – drums

NYC

The Dizzy Gillespie tracks were also issued by Prestige on the following 78 rpm singles:

- Prestige 728: Sonny Stitt - To Think You've Chosen Me / Dizzy Gillespie - Thinking Of You
- Prestige 736: Dizzy Gillespie - She's Gone Again / Nice Work If You Can Get It

=== January 17, 1951 ("Morpheus," "Whispering" & "Down") ===
- Miles Davis – trumpet
- Bennie Green – trombone
- Sonny Rollins – tenor saxophone
- John Lewis – piano
- Percy Heath – bass
- Roy Haynes – drums

Apex Studios, New York City

Two takes of the tune "Blue Room" were also recorded at this session. This was Miles Davis' first recording session for Prestige Records, for whom he would record many albums over the next five years, as well as his first credited appearance as leader on an LP album. Davis had previously recorded one session under his own name, with Charlie Parker's band, for Savoy Records in 1947 (available on First Miles), and three sessions with his nonet for Capitol Records over 1949-1950 (Birth of the Cool). It was also his first session with the young Sonny Rollins. After the session was completed, they would record one more track entitled "I Know" under Rollins' name, with Davis on piano. The Rollins track is available on the album Sonny Rollins with the Modern Jazz Quartet (PRLP 7029). Earlier in the same day, before his session at Prestige, Davis had also recorded a session as a sideman with Charlie Parker, for Verve Records, found on the Parker album Swedish Schnapps.

The Miles Davis tracks, including "Blue Room", were also released on two 78 rpm singles. "Blue Room" would later be part of Davis' second 10"LP Blue Period (PRLP 140), and all four tracks would be re-released on the 12"LP Miles Davis and Horns (PRLP 7025), after the 10" format was discontinued.

- Prestige 734: Miles Davis - Morpheus / Blue Room
- Prestige 742: Miles Davis - Down / Whispering
