= Miles Davis, Vol. 2 =

Studio album by Miles Davis
- Released: Early October 1953
- Recorded: April 20, 1953
- Studio: WOR, NYC
- Genre: Bebop; hard bop
- Length: 21:16
- Label: Blue Note; BLP 5022
- Producer: Alfred Lion

Miles Davis chronology
| The Compositions of Al Cohn (1953) | Miles Davis, Vol. 2 (1953) | Miles Davis, Vol. 3 (1954) |

Professional ratings
Review scores
| Source | Rating |
|---|---|
| AllMusic | 4/5 stars |
| The Penguin Guide to Jazz Recordings | 3.5/4 stars |

Miles Davis, Vol. 2 is the fifth 10-inch LP by trumpeter Miles Davis, recorded on April 20, 1953, and released on Blue Note later that year—his second session and first release for the label.

== Background ==
=== Personal life ===
The recording was made at a point in Davis' life when he was struggling with heroin addiction; in his autobiography Davis recounts Jimmy Heath, Art Blakey and he were all very high in the studio. Davis also states that the song title "C.T.A." was named after Heath's girlfriend Connie Theresa Ann.

=== Release history ===
Early 1956, Blue Note reissued the contents of Miles Davis's three sessions on two 12" LPs, Miles Davis Vols. 1 & 2, shortly after Davis won the DownBeat readers poll as best trumpeter; the two volumes of repackaged Miles Davis material were the first releases in Blue Note's new 1500 series of 12" LPs.

== Track listing ==
Side 1
| No. | Title | Writer(s) | Length |
|---|---|---|---|
| 1. | "Tempus Fugit" | Bud Powell | 3:53 |
| 2. | "Enigma" | Jay Jay Johnson | 3:25 |
| 3. | "Ray's Idea" | Gil Fuller; Ray Brown | 3:46 |

Side 2
| No. | Title | Writer(s) | Length |
|---|---|---|---|
| 1. | "Kelo" | Johnson | 3:20 |
| 2. | "I Waited for You" | Fuller; Dizzy Gillespie | 3:31 |
| 3. | "C.T.A." | Jimmy Heath | 3:36 |
| Total length: | | | 21:31 |

== Personnel ==
- Miles Davis – trumpet
- J. J. Johnson – trombone
- Jimmy Heath – tenor saxophone
- Gil Coggins – piano
- Percy Heath – bass
- Art Blakey – drums
