= Sonny Truitt =

American jazz musician

- Born: Sumner Clement Truitt; October 22, 1926
- Died: November 1, 1995 (aged 69)
- Education: Oceanside High School
- Occupation: Musician
- Years active: 1950 – 1989

Sumner Clement "Sonny" Truitt (October 22, 1926 – November 1, 1995) was an American jazz trombonist, pianist, and composer. He was best known for his work with Miles Davis.

== Early life and career ==
Born in New York City on October 22, 1926, Truitt was the eldest of two sons born to Massachusetts natives Dorothy (née Robinson) and Clement Jansen Truitt.

== Discography ==
With Jim Chapin

- Jim Chapin Sextet (Prestige, 1955)
- Drummer Delight (MMO, 1961)

With Miles Davis

- Miles Davis and Horns (Prestige, 1953)

With Charlie Mariano

- Charlie Mariano (Prestige, 1951)

With Tony Scott

- The Complete Tony Scott (RCA, 1956)

With The Six (John Glasel & Bob Wilber)

- The View from Jazzbo's Head (Bethlehem, 1956)
