= Blue Haze =

Compilation album by Miles Davis
- Released: Early October 1956
- Recorded: May 19, 1953, March 15 and April 3, 1954
- Studio: WOR (New York City); Van Gelder (Hackensack)
- Genre: Jazz, bebop, hard bop
- Length: 36:33
- Label: Prestige PRLP 7054
- Producer: Bob Weinstock, Ira Gitler

Miles Davis chronology
Quintet/Sextet (1956)	Blue Haze (1956)	Collectors' Items (1956)

Professional ratings
Review scores
Source	Rating
AllMusic	3/5 stars
The Encyclopedia of Popular Music	3/5 stars
The Penguin Guide to Jazz Recordings	3/4 stars
The Rolling Stone Jazz Record Guide	4/5 stars

Blue Haze is a compilation album of tracks recorded in 1953 and 1954 by Miles Davis for Prestige Records.

== Overview ==
The album is a reissue in 12" format of the 10" LP Miles Davis Quartet (PRLP 161), with "I'll Remember April" added. Tracks 4, 6, 7, and 8 come from Prestige PREP 1326, The Miles Davis Quartet, recorded May 19, 1953. It features a quartet with John Lewis on piano —replaced on "Smooch" by its co-composer Charles Mingus— Percy Heath, the bassist throughout the album, and Max Roach on drums. Tracks 2, 3, and 5, from March 15, 1954, with Horace Silver on piano and Art Blakey on drums, were first released on PREP 1360, titled Miles Davis Quartet. The first track on the album, "I'll Remember April", is from the April 3, 1954, session and was originally included on the 10" LP Miles Davis Quintet (PRLP 185).

The compositions "Four" and "Tune Up" were always credited to Davis, although both were claimed by Eddie Vinson to be his compositions. Vinson was a known blues singer at that time and had no use for them and gave Davis permission to record them. No one expressed opposition to the false crediting until decades later.

The album's last track, "Miles Ahead" is not the same composition as featured on the 1957 Columbia Records album Miles Ahead, a big band recording arranged by Gil Evans. The "Miles Ahead" played on Blue Haze is a contrafact, and features a new melody played over the chord changes to John Lewis' tune "Milestones", recorded by Davis in 1947 for Savoy Records.

== Track listing ==
Prestige – LP 7054

Side one
No.	Title	Writer(s)	Length
1.	"I'll Remember April"	Don Raye, Gene de Paul, Patricia Johnston	7:55
2.	"Four"	Eddie Vinson, Miles Davis	4:03
3.	"Old Devil Moon"	Burton Lane, E.Y. Harburg	3:24
4.	"Smooch"	Miles Davis, Charles Mingus	3:06

Side two
No.	Title	Writer(s)	Length
1.	"Blue Haze"	Miles Davis	6:12
2.	"When Lights are Low"	Benny Carter, Spencer Williams	3:29
3.	"Tune Up"	Eddie Vinson, Miles Davis	3:56
4.	"Miles Ahead"	Miles Davis	4:28
Total length:			36:33

== Personnel ==
Track 1 (April 3, 1954)

- Miles Davis – trumpet
- David Schildkraut – alto saxophone
- Horace Silver – piano
- Percy Heath – bass
- Kenny Clarke – drums

Tracks 2, 3 and 5 (March 15, 1954)

- Miles Davis – trumpet
- Horace Silver – piano
- Percy Heath – bass
- Art Blakey – drums

Tracks 4, 6, 7 and 8 (May 19, 1953)

- Miles Davis – trumpet
- John Lewis – piano (6, 7, 8)
- Charles Mingus – piano (4)
- Percy Heath – bass
- Max Roach – drums
