= Miles Davis and Horns =

Compilation album by Miles Davis
- Released: Late March/early April 1956
- Recorded: January 17, 1951; Apex, New York City; February 19, 1953; Beltone, New York City
- Genre: Jazz
- Length: 33:12
- Label: Prestige
- Producers: Bob Weinstock, Ira Gitler

Miles Davis chronology
Dig (1956)	Miles Davis and Horns (1956)	Miles (1956)

Professional ratings
Review scores
Source	Rating
DownBeat (1960 Lp reissue)	3/5 stars
The Encyclopedia of Popular Music	3/5 stars

Miles Davis and Horns (PRLP 7025), also reissued as Early Miles 1951 & 1953 (PRLP 7168), is a compilation album by the American jazz trumpeter Miles Davis. Released in 1956, by Prestige Records, it compiles material from albums previously released by Prestige in the discontinued 10-inch LP format. The fifth, sixth, and eighth tracks were originally issued on the various artists album Modern Jazz Trumpets (PRLP 113), and had also been issued as 78 rpm singles. Tracks 1–4 first appeared on Miles Davis Plays the Compositions of Al Cohn (PRLP 154). Track 3 was also previously released as the B-side of the "Morpheus" single (Prestige 734). Track 7 was originally on Blue Period (PRLP 140).

The cover art was designed by cartoonist Don Martin, who created several albums covers for Prestige before beginning a long tenure with Mad magazine .

== 12" LP track listing ==
PRLP7025

Side one
No.	Title	Writer(s)	Session	Length
1.	"Tasty Pudding"	Al Cohn	February 19, 1953	3:20
2.	"Floppy"	Al Cohn	February 19, 1953	6:00
3.	"Willie the Wailer"	Al Cohn	February 19, 1953	4:26

Side two
No.	Title	Writer(s)	Session	Length
1.	"For Adults Only"	Al Cohn	February 19, 1953	5:33
2.	"Morpheus"	John Lewis	January 17, 1951	2:21
3.	"Down"	Miles Davis	January 17, 1951	2:51
4.	"Blue Room" (Take 2)	Richard Rodgers, Lorenz Hart	January 17, 1951	3:00
5.	"Whispering"	Malvin Schonberger, Richard Coburn, Vincent Rose	January 17, 1951	3:03
Total length:				33:12

An alternate take of "Blue Room" was later added as a bonus track.

== Personnel ==
Tracks 1–4:

- Miles Davis – Trumpet
- Zoot Sims – Tenor saxophone
- Al Cohn – Tenor saxophone
- Sonny Truitt – Trombone (plays on "Floppy" only)
- John Lewis – Piano
- Leonard Gaskin – Bass
- Kenny Clarke – Drums

Tracks 5–8:

- Miles Davis – Trumpet
- Sonny Rollins – Tenor saxophone
- Bennie Green – Trombone
- John Lewis – Piano
- Percy Heath – Bass
- Roy Haynes – Drums
