= Solar (composition) =

Composition written by Chuck Wayne

Composition

from the album Miles Davis Quintet
- Released: 1954
- Genre: Jazz
- Label: Prestige
- Composers: Chuck Wayne; Miles Davis

"Solar" (/ˈsoʊlər/ or /soʊˈlɑːr/) is a composition written by Chuck Wayne and later recorded and copyrighted with small alterations by Miles Davis. It first appeared on Davis's 1954 album Miles Davis Quintet and is considered a modern jazz standard.

== Chord structure ==
"Solar" is considered a blues by most listeners, and the commonly accepted chord structure for this piece is:

Cm^{Maj7}	%	Cm^{7} or Gm^{7}	Gm^{7} : C^{7}
F^{Maj7}	%	Fm^{7}	B♭^{7}
E♭^{Maj7}	E♭m^{7} : A♭^{7}	D♭^{Maj7}	Dm^{7♭5} : G^{7}

== Recordings and popularity ==
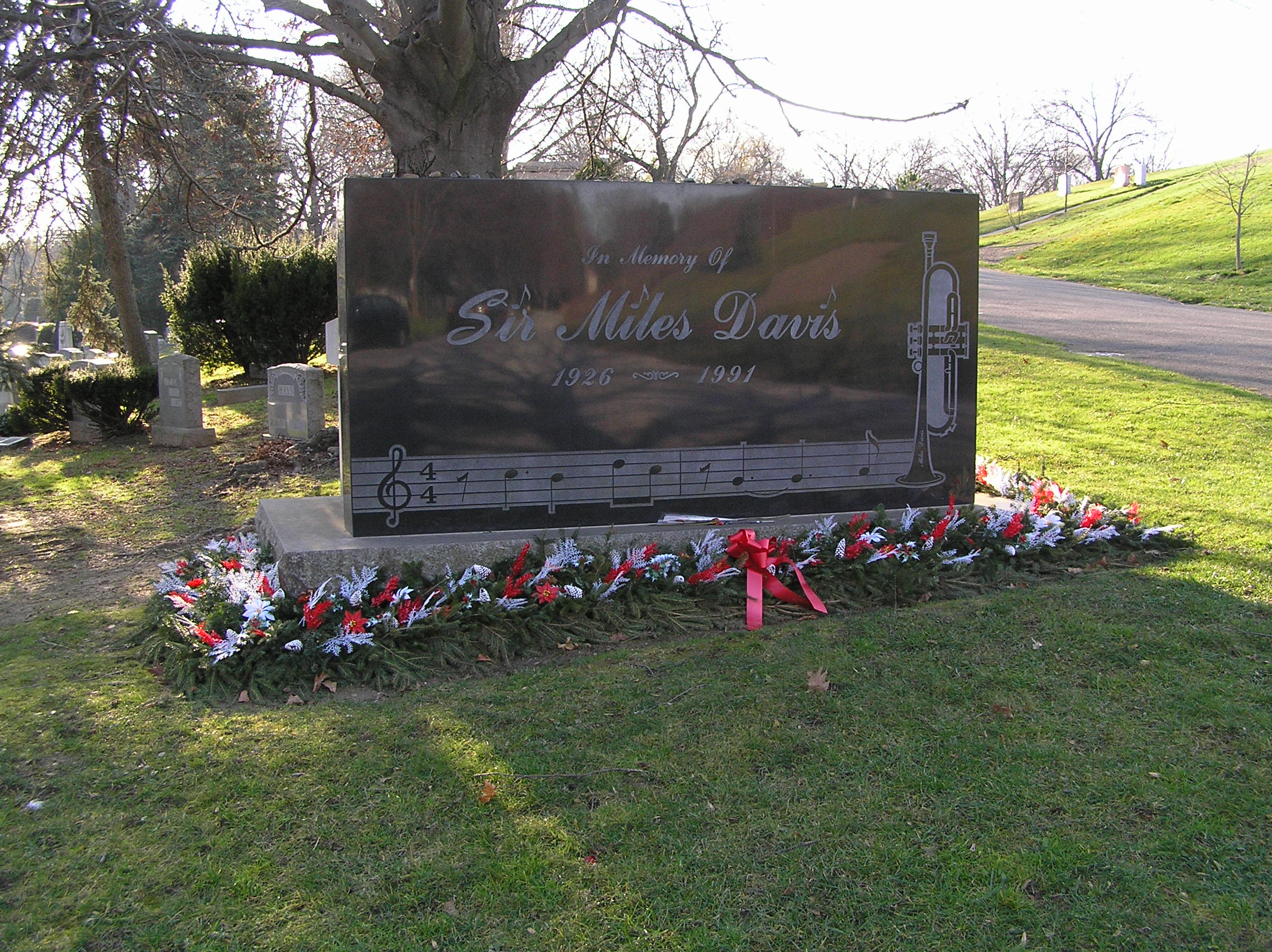
Miles Davis's tombstone, engraved with the first two measures of "Solar"

The first released recording of the piece appeared on Davis's album Miles Davis Quintet in 1954; and then appeared on his album Walkin'. It was the only time that he recorded the piece. Probably the best-known version is on pianist Bill Evans's trio album Sunday at the Village Vanguard from 1961. The composition is popular with educators and learners, partly because the structure is "both rich and succinct".

== Authorship ==
The composition was copyrighted by Prestige Music Co. in Davis's name in 1963. However, some musicians and others believed that it had been written by Wayne, with some making the assertion in print. Proof of the suspicions appeared later: in 2012, a Library of Congress archivist revealed that material donated by Wayne's wife the previous year included an unreleased recording of the guitarist playing the tune at a jam session in 1946. Then, it was known by the title "Sonny", after trumpeter Sonny Berman, who also played at the session. Wayne is believed to have written "Sonny" when he was part of Woody Herman's band in 1946.

The melodies of "Sonny" and "Solar" are the same. Davis altered the opening, major chord of Wayne's composition by making it minor. Davis died in 1991; the first two measures of the composition adorn his tombstone.
