= Collectors' Items =

Studio album by Miles Davis
- Released: December 1956
- Recorded: January 30, 1953 (1–4); WOR, New York City; March 16, 1956 (5–7); Van Gelder, Hackensack
- Genre: Jazz, bebop, hard bop
- Length: 44:05
- Label: Prestige; PRLP 7044
- Producer: Ira Gitler (1-4); Bob Weinstock (5-7)

Miles Davis chronology
Blue Haze (1956)	Collectors' Items (1956)	Birth of the Cool (1957)

Professional ratings
Review scores
Source	Rating
AllMusic	4.5/5 stars
The Encyclopedia of Popular Music	3/5 stars
The Rolling Stone Jazz Record Guide	3/5 stars

Collectors' Items is a 1956 studio album by Miles Davis. There are two sessions collected on the album with largely different musicians. The first 1953 session is "Compulsion", "The Serpent's Tooth" (two takes) and "'Round About Midnight". The second 1956 session is "In Your Own Sweet Way", "Vierd Blues" and "No Line". The personnel for the first session were Davis, Sonny Rollins and Charlie Parker (credited under the pseudonym "Charlie Chan" due to contractual obligations) on tenor sax, Walter Bishop on piano, Percy Heath on bass and Philly Joe Jones on drums. For the second session, the tenor sax was Rollins alone, the piano was Tommy Flanagan, the bass Paul Chambers and Art Taylor on drums.

According to Ira Gitler's liner notes, the 1953 session was only the second time Parker had recorded on tenor saxophone. The CD edition's liner notes indicate the session was the only time Parker and Rollins recorded together.

Davis describes the session with Parker in his autobiography as having been very chaotic. It was Davis' first session of 1953 and his heroin habit had become very bad. Parker had quit his own heroin habit following the arrest of his trumpet player Red Rodney, instead drinking enormous quantities of alcohol. According to Davis, Parker consumed a quart of vodka at the rehearsal, then spoke condescendingly to Davis as if it were his session and Davis an employee or a child. After arguing, Parker fell asleep, angering Davis and in turn angering Gitler who was producing.

The 1953 session remained unreleased for several years, during which Parker died (in March 1955) and Davis left Prestige Records for Columbia Records (in 1956). Part of Davis' contractual obligation to Prestige was to record a second session to pair with the 1953 session that would give Prestige enough material for a full album. For the second session, only Rollins returned, and Davis's band included two relative newcomers to the New York jazz scene. Pianist Tommy Flanagan had just moved to New York City a few weeks prior to the Davis recording session, which was his third recording date in the city. Bassist Paul Chambers had moved to the city in 1955 and first recorded in New York in June at a session for Prestige led by trombonist Bennie Green. Chambers first recorded with Davis in October 1955 for Columbia as part of Davis' regular performing group of the time, which included John Coltrane, Red Garland, and Philly Joe Jones. The Collector's Items session was his third with Davis, and followed the November 1955 session for Miles: The New Miles Davis Quintet.

== Track listing ==
Prestige – PRLP7044

Side one
No.	Title	Writer(s)	Length
1.	"The Serpent's Tooth" (Take 1)	Miles Davis	7:08
2.	"The Serpent's Tooth" (Take 2)	Miles Davis	6:24
3.	"'Round About Midnight"	Thelonious Monk	7:12
4.	"Compulsion"	Miles Davis	5:53

Side two
No.	Title	Writer(s)	Length
1.	"No Line"	Miles Davis	5:48
2.	"Vierd Blues"	Miles Davis	7:00
3.	"In Your Own Sweet Way"	Dave Brubeck	4:40
Total length:			44:05

== Personnel ==
January 30, 1953, session

- Miles Davis – trumpet
- Sonny Rollins – tenor saxophone
- Charlie Parker (as "Charlie Chan") – tenor saxophone
- Walter Bishop Jr. – piano
- Percy Heath – bass
- Philly Joe Jones – drums

March 16, 1956, session

- Miles Davis – trumpet
- Sonny Rollins – tenor saxophone
- Tommy Flanagan – piano
- Paul Chambers – bass
- Art Taylor – drums
