= Dave Schildkraut =

American jazz musician

Dave Schildkraut (January 7, 1925 – January 1, 1998) was an American jazz alto saxophonist.

== Biography ==
Schildkraut first played professionally with Louis Prima in 1941. Following this he played with Buddy Rich (1946), Anita O'Day (1947), Stan Kenton (1953–54), Pete Rugolo (1954), Oscar Pettiford (1954), Miles Davis ("Solar" on Walkin', "I'll Remember April" on Blue Haze 1954), George Handy (1955), Tony Aless (1955), and Ralph Burns, Tito Puente, Johnny Richards, and Kenton again in 1959. From the 1960s, he played freelance in New York City, where he appeared regularly with Eddie Bert at the West End Cafe. Later in his life he went into semi-retirement.

He recorded only one album as a leader, in 1979. However, the album was released only in 2000 by Endgame Records as Last Date. By this time, Schildkraut's playing style was described as having adjusted from youthful mimicry of Parker to showing influence from the likes of John Coltrane, Warne Marsh and Lee Konitz.

== Style ==
Schildkraut played in the bebop idiom and was influenced by Charlie Parker. His playing was similar enough to Parker's that bassist Charles Mingus misidentified Schildkraut as Parker while listening to a recording during a DownBeat magazine "blindfold test" with Leonard Feather.

== Discography ==
=== As leader ===
- Last Date (Endgame, 2000)

=== As sideman ===
- Tony Aless, Long Island Suite (Royal Roost, 1955)
- Buddy Arnold, Wailing (ABC-Paramount, 1956)
- Tony Bennett, Cloud 7 (CBS/Sony, 1975)
- Eddie Bert, Let's Dig Bert (Eddie That Is) (Trans-World, 1955)
- Ralph Burns, Jazz Studio 5 (Decca, 1956)
- Miles Davis, Walkin' (Prestige, 1957)
- George Handy, Handyland U.S.A. ("X", 1954)
- George Handy, By George! (Handy, of Course) ("X", 1956)
- Stan Kenton, Kenton Showcase (Capitol, 1954)
- Stan Kenton, The Kenton Era (Capitol, 1955)
- Sam Most, Plays Bird, Bud, Monk and Miles (Bethlehem, 1957)
- Oscar Pettiford, Basically Duke (Bethlehem, 1954)
- Jimmy Raney, Chuck Wayne, Joe Puma, Dick Garcia, The Fourmost Guitars (ABC-Paramount, 1957)
- Johnny Richards, Walk Softly Run Wild (Coral, 1959)
- Pete Rugolo, Rugolomania (Columbia, 1955)
- Pete Rugolo, New Sounds by Pete Rugolo (Harmony, 1957)
