= Quintet/Sextet =

Studio album by Miles Davis and Milt Jackson
- Released: August 1956
- Recorded: August 5, 1955
- Studio: Van Gelder (Hackensack)
- Genre: Jazz
- Length: 31:01
- Label: Prestige; PRLP 7034
- Producer: Bob Weinstock

Miles Davis and Milt Jackson chronology
Miles (1956)	Quintet/Sextet (1956)	Blue Haze (1956)

Quintet/Sextet, also reissued as Odyssey!, is a studio album by the trumpeter Miles Davis and vibraphonist Milt Jackson released by Prestige Records in August 1956. It was recorded on August 5, 1955. Credited to "Miles Davis and Milt Jackson", this was an "all-star" session, and did not feature any of the members of Davis's working group of that time. Alto saxophonist Jackie McLean appears on his own compositions “Dr. Jackle” and “Minor March”.

== Background and recording ==
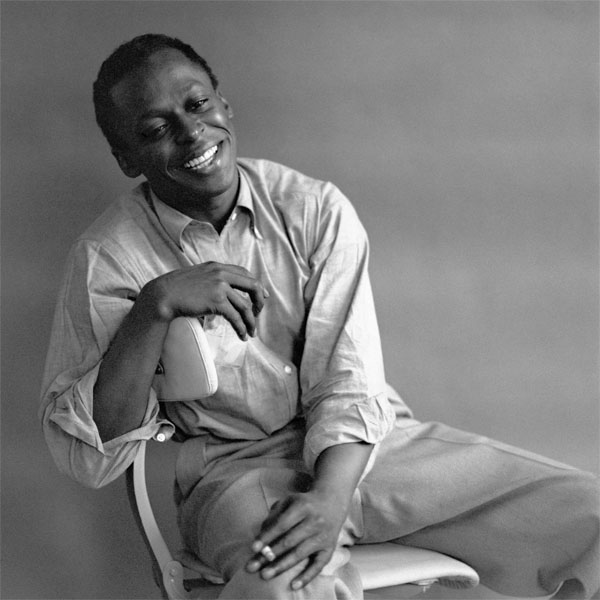
Davis in the mid-1950s

After the release of Blue Moods, a collaboration with Charles Mingus on which Davis only participated to pay back fees to Mingus, Davis recorded with his new band in New York's Café Bohemia. That band included the young Sonny Rollins (tenor saxophone) as well as the rhythm section of pianist Red Garland, bassist Paul Chambers and drummer Philly Joe Jones, whom Davis retained for the Miles Davis Quintet (with tenor saxophonist John Coltrane). This album’s August sessions did not feature Davis’ current working band, but an "All Star" lineup, with Milt Jackson (vibraphone), bassist Percy Heath and drummer Art Taylor. Davis also hired pianist Ray Bryant, because he wanted a bebop sound.

Together with Jackson and Heath, Davis recorded with Thelonious Monk during the December 1954 session (Miles Davis and the Modern Jazz Giants). Art Taylor was then effectively a "house drummer" for the Prestige label. Sonny Rollins was replaced with the young alto saxophonist Jackie McLean, who composed and arranged the two pieces on which he played, "Dr. Jackle" and "Minor March", the latter the only up-tempo tune in that session. "Minor March" (renamed "Minor Apprehension") was later included on McLean’s 1959 Blue Note album New Soil.

The tune "Dr. Jackle" shows McLean's connection with the blues as well as with Charlie Parker, Davis plays in a lyrical fashion and Ray Bryant plays in more rhythmic, soul-driven style. "Minor March" has rhythmic breaks and a bridge, that are similar to Bud Powell's composition "Tempus Fugue-it"; McLean's cadentials, honks and screams anticipate the style of his future Blue Note recordings.

Miles Davis commented critically in his autobiography on the saxophonist's style:

I remember Jackie got so high he got terrified he couldn't play. I don't know what that shit was all about, but after this date, I never used Jackie again.

It was the last joint session by Miles Davis and Percy Heath as well as the only performance by pianist Ray Bryant on a Davis album. Bryant wrote "Blues Changes" (later renamed to "Changes"). Davis plays trumpet with a mute on this track, which has a typical romantic-tranquil mood. Thad Jones' composition "Bitty Ditty" is characterized by Bryant's integration of blues, gospel and bebop.

== Reception ==
Professional ratings
Review scores
Source	Rating
AllMusic	3/5 stars
The Encyclopedia of Popular Music	3/5 stars
The Penguin Guide to Jazz Recordings	3.5/4 stars
The Rolling Stone Jazz Record Guide	4/5 stars

Quintet/Sextet received overall positive reception. Davis' biographer Peter Wießmüller said that this album is "way more straightforward and intensive than Blue Moods, released four weeks prior", and "the pendulum in Miles' stylistical progression hits in the direction of the experimential workup of bebop into a closed hardbop concept, and conservative as well as progressive elements are getting fused with each other; (...) the subtle arrangements of Blue Moods are yielded towards a certain expressive hardness".

Jackie McLean is encouraged by the other musicians to play markedly long and fantastic solos in the otherwise typical arrangements of "Dr. Jackle" and "Minor March". The short session is revived through "the excellent vibraphone playing by Milt Jackson and Jackie McLean's extroverted alto phrasing, which emphasizes Bird's heritage more than before, greatly revive the musical scene."

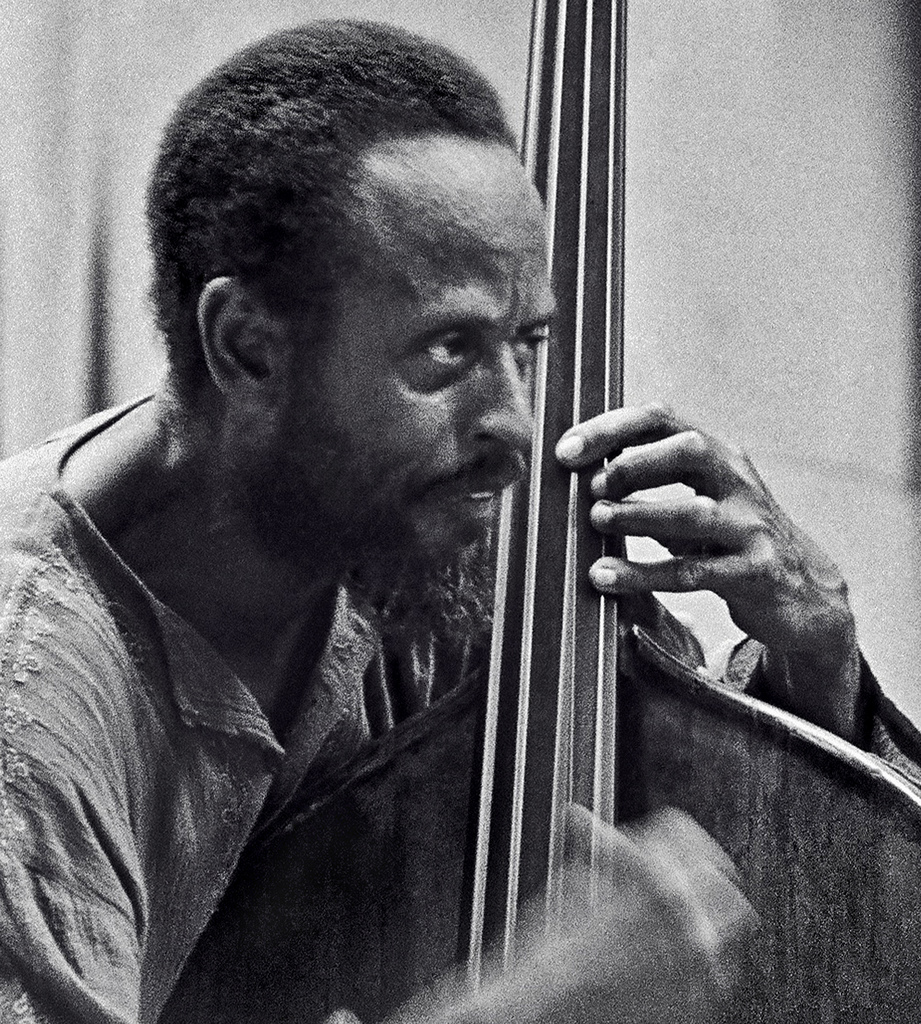
Percy Heath (1977)

Critics Richard Cook and Brian Morton awarded the album 4 out of 5 stars in The Penguin Guide to Jazz. Scott Yanow from AllMusic stated that it was "one of the most obscure of [Davis's] Prestige recordings", but its quality is still "fairly high". He named "Dr. Jackle" and "Minor March" as his highlights.

== Track listing ==
Side one
No.	Title	Writer(s)	Length
1.	"Dr. Jackle"	Jackie McLean	8:55
2.	"Bitty Ditty"	Thad Jones	6:37

Side two
No.	Title	Writer(s)	Length
1.	"Minor March"	Jackie McLean	8:18
2.	"Changes"	Ray Bryant	7:11
Total length:			31:01

== Personnel ==
- Miles Davis – trumpet
- Milt Jackson – vibraphone
- Jackie McLean – alto saxophone (“Dr. Jackle” & “Minor March”)
- Ray Bryant – piano
- Percy Heath – bass
- Art Taylor – drums

== Sources ==
- Richard Cook & Brian Morton. The Penguin Guide to Jazz on CD 6th edition. ISBN 0-14-051521-6
- Miles Davis, Quincy Troupe: Miles, the Autobiography: Simon and Schuster, 1990. ISBN 9780671725822
- Dan Morgenstern: Liner Notes. CD issue of Chronicle – The Complete Prestige Recordings
- (In German) Eric Nisenson: Round about Midnight – Ein Portrait von Miles Davis. Wien, Hannibal, 1985 ISBN 3-85445-021-4
- (In German) Peter Wießmüller: Miles Davis. Oreos, Schaftlach, 1985
