= Beltone Studios =

Former recording studio in New York City

Coordinates: 40.76180°N 73.98325°W

Beltone Studios was a recording studio at 1650 Broadway, Manhattan, New York City. Miles Davis's album Miles Davis and Horns was partly recorded here in 1953, and The Crows 1954 hit "Gee" was also recorded here, the same year. In 1960, it established Beltone Records.
