= My Old Flame =

1934 song by Arthur Johnston and Sam Coslow

"My Old Flame" is a 1934 song composed by Arthur Johnston with lyrics by Sam Coslow for the film Belle of the Nineties. It has since become a jazz standard.

== History ==
"My Old Flame" first appeared in the 1934 film Belle of the Nineties when it was sung by Mae West, backed by the Duke Ellington Orchestra. Six weeks after filming wrapped with West, Ellington recorded the tune with singer Ivie Anderson, released on Commodore 585. It became a No. 7 hit for Guy Lombardo later that year but it was not until the early 1940s that the tune re-emerged, entering the repertoire of the orchestras of Benny Goodman and Count Basie.

== Notable recordings ==
"My Old Flame" has become a jazz standard and has been sung by the likes of Billie Holiday, Peggy Lee, Dinah Washington, Helen Humes and Marlena Shaw, with instrumental interpretations by Charlie Parker for the Dial label in 1947, Gerry Mulligan with Chet Baker in 1953, trombonist J.J. Johnson on his 1957 album Trombone Master, Sonny Rollins on his 1993 album Old Flames, and many others. The tune was also recorded by the Stan Kenton orchestra and Zoot Sims in a "sensitive rendition" according to Jazz Improv magazine. Spike Jones and his City Slickers recorded a spoof version in 1947 featuring vocals by Paul Frees (imitating Peter Lorre). John Scofield included the song in his 2022 solo album.

== Lyrics and structure ==
The music has an AABA structure. It is written in the key of G major, and features a change to B♭ in the 'B' section.

As a vehicle for West, while the lyric contains "characteristically flippant lines – 'My old flame/ I can't even remember his name' – it suggests that her brazen sexuality is the carapace for a lost youthful love": 'But their attempts at love/ Were only imitations of/ My old flame'.
