= Apex Studios =

Coordinates: 40°45′54.0″N 73°58′38.4″W

Apex Studios was a recording studio in Manhattan, New York City. It had a high reputation for recording jazz. It was located in the Beaux Arts Steinway building. The owner was Bob Scheuing. When Al Schmitt started in 1950, the two engineers were Fred Herbert Otto and Tom Dowd.

Apex did almost all of the work for National, Atlantic, and Prestige record labels.

Miles Davis's album Miles Davis and Horns was partly recorded here in 1951. Duke Ellington did a session with his son, Mercer. It was one of the first major sessions engineered by Al Schmitt.

The studio also recorded radio shows for Voice of America in many languages.

Artists that recorded at the studio included Charlie Parker, The Clovers, Clyde McPhatter, the Modern Jazz Quartet, Peppermint Harris, Lightnin' Hopkins.

The studio went bankrupt and closed in the early 1950s.

== Notable recordings ==
- The Clovers, "Don't You Know I Love You"
