= Miles Davis at Fillmore =

Live album by Miles Davis
- Released: October 28, 1970
- Recorded: June 17–20, 1970
- Venue: Fillmore East auditorium in New York City
- Genre: Jazz-rock
- Length: 101:26
- Label: Columbia
- Producer: Teo Macero

Miles Davis chronology
Bitches Brew (1970)	Miles Davis at Fillmore (1970)	Jack Johnson (1971)

Miles Davis live chronology
Black Beauty: Miles Davis at Fillmore West (1970)	Miles Davis at Fillmore (1970)	Miles at the Fillmore – Miles Davis 1970: The Bootleg Series Vol. 3 (1970)

Miles Davis at Fillmore is a 1970 live album by the jazz trumpeter Miles Davis and band, recorded at the Fillmore East, New York City on four consecutive days, June 17 through June 20, 1970, originally released as a double vinyl LP. The performances featured the double keyboard set-up Davis toured with for a few months, with Keith Jarrett and Chick Corea playing electronic organ and Fender Rhodes electric piano, respectively. The group opened for Laura Nyro at these performances.

Compositions include, besides the standard "I Fall in Love Too Easily", tracks from his fusion studio albums Bitches Brew and In A Silent Way. The live performances were heavily edited by producer Teo Macero, and the results were named for the day of the week the band performed; only on the 1997 Columbia CD reissue were the compositions and composers identified and indexed. Promotional LP copies divided the sides into short individually titled pieces, but still did not identify the original compositions and composers.

On March 25, 2014, the full recordings of the performances were issued as Miles at the Fillmore - Miles Davis 1970: The Bootleg Series Vol. 3.

== Release history ==
Miles Davis at Fillmore was released on vinyl as a double album, with liner notes written by Morgan Ames of High Fidelity, and Mort Goode. It was released on CD in Japan in 1987, but not made available on CD in the States until 1997, when Columbia released it as one of five live albums from the same period (the others being Live-Evil, In Concert: Live at Philharmonic Hall, Dark Magus, and Black Beauty: Live at the Fillmore West). This reissue featured additional liner notes by drummer Jack DeJohnette. Columbia aimed the release for the jazz market but also for college and alternative radio stations.

Marguerite Eskridge, Davis' girlfriend at the time, appeared in the album cover's photo collage.

== Critical reception ==
Professional ratings
Retrospective reviews
Review scores
Source	Rating
AllMusic	3/5 stars
Christgau's Record Guide	B
DownBeat	4/5 stars
Entertainment Weekly	B−
Los Angeles Times	3.5/4 stars
The Penguin Guide to Jazz Recordings	3.5/4 stars
The Rolling Stone Album Guide	3/5 stars

In Christgau's Record Guide: Rock Albums of the Seventies (1981), Robert Christgau found Miles Davis at Fillmore to be less focused than Bitches Brew because the music meandered "unforgivably", particularly Chick Corea and Keith Jarrett's keyboard playing on "Wednesday". He said the tracks should have been edited down together to highlight the "treasures" they each offer, including "the cool atmospherics that lead off Wednesday, the hard bop in extremis toward the end of Thursday, the way Miles blows sharply lyrical over Jack DeJohnette's rock march and Airto Moreira's jungle sci-fi for the last few minutes of Friday, all the activity surrounding Steve Grossman's solo on Saturday". In The Rolling Stone Album Guide (2004), J. D. Considine said At Fillmore had "a frenzied, clangorous approach", less lyrical than the contemporaneous Black Beauty (which was released a few years later).

The album was nominated for a Grammy Award: Best Jazz Performance by a Group.

== Track listing ==
=== 1970 double LP ===
Columbia – G 30038, C 30241, C 30242:

Side one
No.	Title	Writer(s)	Recording session	Length
1.	"Wednesday Miles"	Miles Davis	June 17, 1970	24:14

Side two
No.	Title	Writer(s)	Recording session	Length
1.	"Thursday Miles"	Miles Davis	June 18, 1970	26:55

Side three
No.	Title	Writer(s)	Recording session	Length
1.	"Friday Miles"	Miles Davis	June 19, 1970	27:57

Side four
No.	Title	Writer(s)	Recording session	Length
1.	"Saturday Miles"	Miles Davis	June 20, 1970	22:20
Total length:				101:26

=== 1997 CD Reissue ===
Columbia – C2K 65139:

Disc one Wednesday Miles (June 17, 1970)
No.	Title	Writer(s)	Length
1.	"Directions"	Joe Zawinul	2:29
2.	"Bitches Brew"	Miles Davis	0:53
3.	"The Mask"	Miles Davis	1:35
4.	"It's About That Time"	Miles Davis	8:12
5.	"Bitches Brew/The Theme"	Miles Davis	10:55

Thursday Miles (June 18, 1970)
No.	Title	Writer(s)	Length
6.	"Directions"	Joe Zawinul	5:35
7.	"The Mask"	Miles Davis	9:50
8.	"It's About That Time"	Miles Davis	11:22
Total length:			50:51

Disc two Friday Miles (June 19, 1970)
No.	Title	Writer(s)	Length
1.	"It's About That Time"	Miles Davis	9:01
2.	"I Fall in Love Too Easily"	Jule Styne & Sammy Cahn	2:00
3.	"Sanctuary"	Wayne Shorter	3:44
4.	"Bitches Brew/The Theme"	Miles Davis	13:09

Saturday Miles (June 20, 1970)
No.	Title	Writer(s)	Length
5.	"It's About That Time"	Miles Davis	3:43
6.	"I Fall in Love Too Easily"	Jule Styne & Sammy Cahn	0:54
7.	"Sanctuary"	Wayne Shorter	2:49
8.	"Bitches Brew"	Miles Davis	6:57
9.	"Willie Nelson/The Theme"	Miles Davis	7:57
Total length:			50:14

== Personnel ==
Musicians

- Miles Davis – trumpet with Harmon mute
- Steve Grossman – tenor saxophone, soprano saxophone
- Chick Corea – Fender Rhodes electric piano with delay/fuzz pedals and ring modulator
- Keith Jarrett – Fender Contempo Organ with delay/fuzz pedals + tambourine
- Dave Holland – acoustic and electric bass guitar with wah-wah pedal
- Jack DeJohnette – drums
- Airto Moreira – cuica, transverse flute, whistle, kazoo, shakers, bells, woodblock, tambourine

Production

- Teo Macero – producer
- Stan Tonkel – recording engineer
- Russ Payne – mixing engineer
- Nick Fasciano – original cover design
- Jim Marshall – cover photography
- Don Hunstein – original liner photography

== See also ==
- Black Beauty: Miles Davis at Fillmore West
- Miles Davis discography

== Bibliography ==
- Christgau, Robert (October 13, 1981). Christgau's Record Guide: Rock Albums of the Seventies. Ticknor & Fields. ISBN 0899190251.
- Considine, J. D.; et al. (November 2, 2004). Brackett, Nathan; Hoard, Christian (eds.). The New Rolling Stone Album Guide: Completely Revised and Updated 4th Edition. Simon & Schuster. ISBN 0-7432-0169-8.
