= Miles at the Fillmore – Miles Davis 1970: The Bootleg Series Vol. 3 =

2014 live album by Miles Davis

Live album by Miles Davis
- Released: March 25, 2014
- Recorded: April 11, 1970; June 17–20, 1970
- Venues: Fillmore East auditorium New York City; Fillmore West auditorium San Francisco, CA (April 11, 1970 only)
- Genres: Jazz rock; Jazz fusion; funk
- Length: 250:18
- Label: Columbia/Legacy
- Producer: Teo Macero

Miles Davis chronology
Live in Europe 1969: The Bootleg Series Vol. 2 (2013)	Miles at the Fillmore – Miles Davis 1970: The Bootleg Series Vol. 3 (2014)	Miles Davis at Newport 1955–1975: The Bootleg Series Vol. 4 (2015)

Miles Davis live chronology
Miles Davis at Fillmore (1970)	Miles at the Fillmore – Miles Davis 1970: The Bootleg Series Vol. 3 (1970)	The Cellar Door Sessions 1970 (1970)

Miles at the Fillmore – Miles Davis 1970: The Bootleg Series Vol. 3 is a four-CD live album compiling the four nights of Miles Davis's performances at the Fillmore East in New York City, June 17–20, 1970, with three additional tracks recorded at the Fillmore West two months earlier. The concert series was originally released in part as the double album Miles Davis at Fillmore (Columbia, 1970) but was given the first complete unedited release on this box set.

== Reception ==
Professional ratings
Aggregate scores
Source	Rating
Metacritic	92/100
Review scores
Source	Rating
AllMusic	4.5/5 stars
PopMatters	10/10 stars
The Guardian	4/5 stars
The Observer	3/5 stars

Miles at the Fillmore – Miles Davis 1970: The Bootleg Series Vol. 3 received mainly positive reviews on release. At Metacritic, which assigns a normalised rating out of 100 to reviews from mainstream critics, the album has received a score of 92, based on 11 reviews which is categorised as universal acclaim.

Thom Jurek's review on AllMusic stated: "The charts are loose but focused, and the group's improvisational dynamic is breathtaking, entirely different each night. Davis is exceptionally strong. His playing is inventive, full of questions and muscular statements." PopMatters's Matthew Fiander gave the album 10 out of 10, saying: "It was a time of turmoil, but for Davis's music, turmoil was a state of creation, and these four nights give us four distinct and brilliantly built storms." The Guardian's John Fordham called the band "controversial and brilliant" and the music "a chapter in the story of 20th-century music as a whole, not just the minutiae of jazz". The Observer's Dave Gelly said: "It certainly gets close to chaos at times, but these live shows often did. From that point of view at least, it's truly authentic."

== Track listing ==
All tracks are written by Miles Davis, except as indicated.

Disc one
No.	Title	Writer(s)	Length
1.	"Introduction"		0:04
2.	"Directions"	Joe Zawinul	10:23
3.	"The Mask"		11:04
4.	"It's About That Time"		10:44
5.	"Bitches Brew"		13:41
6.	"The Theme"		0:40
7.	"Paraphernalia"	Wayne Shorter	11:02
8.	"Footprints"	Shorter	11:13

- Recorded at the Fillmore East in NYC on June 17, 1970 (tracks 1–6) and the Fillmore West in San Francisco, CA on April 11, 1970 (tracks 7 & 8)

Disc two
No.	Title	Writer(s)	Length
1.	"Directions"	Zawinul	10:10
2.	"The Mask"		11:29
3.	"It's About That Time"		12:03
4.	"Bitches Brew"		11:57
5.	"The Theme"		1:29
6.	"Spanish Key (Encore)"		10:20
7.	"The Theme"		0:27

- Recorded at the Fillmore East in NYC on June 18, 1970

Disc three
No.	Title	Writer(s)	Length
1.	"Directions"	Zawinul	12:50
2.	"The Mask"		10:00
3.	"It's About That Time"		11:27
4.	"I Fall in Love Too Easily"	Jule Styne; Sammy Cahn	1:47
5.	"Sanctuary"	Shorter	3:24
6.	"Bitches Brew"		12:38
7.	"The Theme"		0:44
8.	"Miles Runs the Voodoo Down"		13:20

- Recorded at the Fillmore East in NYC on June 19, 1970 (tracks 1–7) and the Fillmore West in San Francisco, CA on April 11, 1970 (track 8)

Disc four
No.	Title	Writer(s)	Length
1.	"Directions"	Zawinul	10:48
2.	"The Mask"		11:14
3.	"It's About That Time"		11:03
4.	"I Fall in Love Too Easily"	Styne; Cahn	1:20
5.	"Sanctuary"	Shorter	3:20
6.	"Bitches Brew"		9:39
7.	"Willie Nelson"		9:21
8.	"The Theme"		0:37

- Recorded at the Fillmore East in NYC on June 20, 1970

== Personnel ==
- Miles Davis – trumpet with Harmon mute
- Steve Grossman – tenor saxophone, soprano saxophone
- Chick Corea – Fender Rhodes electric piano with delay/fuzz pedals and ring modulator
- Keith Jarrett – Fender Contempo Organ with delay/fuzz pedals + tambourine (Fillmore East tracks only)
- Dave Holland – acoustic and electric bass guitar with wah-wah pedal
- Jack DeJohnette – drums
- Airto Moreira – cuica, transverse flute, whistle, kazoo, shakers, bells, woodblock, tambourine

== Charts ==
=== Weekly ===
Chart (2014)	Peak position
Dutch Albums (MegaCharts)	81
French Albums (SNEP)	182
German Albums ((Offizielle Top 100)	96
Italian Albums (FIMI)	83
UK Albums (OCC)	120
US Billboard 200	189
US Jazz Albums (Billboard)	1

=== Year-end ===
Chart (2014)	Position
US Jazz Albums (Billboard)	49
