= Ken McMullen =

Ken McMullen may refer to:

- Ken McMullen (baseball) (born 1942), former third baseman in Major League Baseball
- Ken McMullen (film director) (born 1948), English film director and artist
- Ken McMullen (rugby) (1941–1986), Australian rugby union and rugby league player
