= It's the Little Things We Do =

Single by The Zutons

from the album Tired of Hanging Around
- B-side: "Sometimes I'm So Polite"; "Valerie" (Live); "Higher & Higher" (Live From Colin Murray)
- Released: 27 November 2006
- Recorded: Autumn 2005
- Genre: Indie
- Length: 3:07
- Label: Deltasonic
- Songwriters: Boyan Chowdhury; Abi Harding; Dave McCabe; Sean Payne; Russell Pritchard
- Producer: Stephen Street

The Zutons singles chronology
"Oh Stacey (Look What You've Done!)" (2006)	"It's the Little Things We Do" (2006)	"Always Right Behind You" (2008)

"It's the Little Things We Do" is the fourth and final single released from English rock band The Zutons' second album Tired of Hanging Around. It became the band's first single since 2003 to fail to chart in the UK Top 40, peaking in the UK Top 75 at #47.

== Track listing ==
=== CD Version ===
1. "It's the Little Things We Do"
2. "Sometimes I'm So Polite"
3. "Valerie" (Live)
4. "It's the Little Things We Do" (Video)

=== 7" Version ===
1. "It's the Little Things We Do"
2. "Higher and Higher" (Colin Murray Session)
