= Tomorrow Is Here =

Studio album by Willie Bobo
- Released: 1977
- Recorded: October 1976–January 1977
- Genre: Jazz
- Length: 34:50
- Label: Blue Note

Willie Bobo chronology
Do What You Want to Do (1971)	Tomorrow Is Here (1977)	Hell of an Act to Follow (1978)

Tomorrow Is Here is an album by American jazz percussionist Willie Bobo recorded in late 1976 and early 1977 and released on the Blue Note label.

== Reception ==
Professional ratings
Review scores
Source	Rating
AllMusic	3/5 stars

The AllMusic review by Richard S. Ginell states "Tomorrow Is Here has a pronounced '70s R&B/funk feel, with synthesizers, envelope followers, electric pianos, guitars and occasional strings interwoven with Bobo's steady Latin congas, timbales and self-effacing vocals. But there are a few gems to be found here".

== Track listing ==
1. "Suitcase Full Of Dreams" – 3:48
2. "Funk De Mambo" – 3:17
3. "Keep On Walking" – 4:28
4. "Dreamin'" – 5:08
5. "Wacky Tobacky (The Race)" – 2:58
6. "Can't Stay Down Too Long" – 3:29
7. "Time After Time" – 3:16
8. "Kojak Theme" – 3:33
9. "A Little Tear" – 4:53

- Recorded at Oceanway Studios in Los Angeles, California between October, 1976 and January, 1977.

== Personnel ==
- Willie Bobo – vocals, percussion
- Gary Grant, Ron King, Nolan Smith – trumpet
- George Bohanon, Thurman Green – trombone
- Ray Pizzi, Ernie Watts – saxophone
- Gary Herbig – reeds
- Reggie Andrews, Larry Farrow, David Garfield – keyboards
- Dennis Budimir, John Cadrecha, Craig McMullen, Sidney Muldrow, Curtis Robertson Jr. – guitar
- Dean Cortez, Jim Hughart, David Troncoso – bass
- Gary Denton, James Gadson, Jeff Porcaro, Carlos Vega – drums
- Victor Pantoja – percussion
- Sandi Erwin, Benard Ighner – vocals
