= One to One (Syreeta album) =

Studio album by Syreeta
- Released: February 9, 1977
- Recorded: 1975 – January 1977
- Genre: R&B, soul, smooth soul, disco, reggae, funk, Afrobeat
- Length: 40:10
- Label: Tamla
- Producer: Leon Ware, Syreeta Wright, Curtis Robertson Jr., Stevie Wonder ("Harmour Love" only)

Syreeta chronology
Stevie Wonder Presents: Syreeta (1974)	One to One (1977)	Rich Love, Poor Love (1977)

One to One is the third studio album released by American R&B singer and songwriter Syreeta Wright in February 1977 by Motown. It serves as her first album Wright released where former husband Stevie Wonder did not oversee most of its production, instead only being involved with the song "Harmour Love", which was released as a single.

== Background ==
By the time of its release, Wright was a noted yet overlooked artist on the Motown label. Initially established as a session backing vocalist for such Motown stars such as Diana Ross and the Supremes and Martha Reeves and the Vandellas, she also had gained recognition in the music industry for co-writing several of the label's hit singles including The Spinners' "It's a Shame" and her first husband Stevie Wonder's hits, "Signed, Sealed, Delivered (I'm Yours)" and "If You Really Love Me", and also writing the lyrics to most of Wonder's compositions for his albums, Where I'm Coming From, Music of My Mind, and Talking Book. Wright's first two albums of her own merit, Syreeta and Stevie Wonder Presents: Syreeta, were critically acclaimed releases but didn't gain any commercial success, though the latter album found success with several of its numbers becoming hits in the United Kingdom. In 1975, Wright and Wonder wrote and produced a reggae-flavored love song titled "Harmour Love". Because Wonder was busy working on his own ambitious project, Songs in the Key of Life, Wright decided to work on most of the material of her third album without him.

Hip-hop group G-Unit sampled "I Too Am Wanting" in their single "Smile" from their debut album Beg for Mercy. Rapper Curren$y's hip-hop group, Jet Life, also takes a sample of "I Too Am Wanting" in their song "1st Place", released as the first single from their collaboration album Jet World Order (2011).

== Recording ==
Hiring Leon Ware, with whom she had worked with in the past, and her then-husband bassist Curtis Robertson Jr., to help collaborate on her next album, Wright decided to take production duties herself for the first time in her career. Most of the material was recorded at Motown's recording studios in Los Angeles, California and was inspired by a 1975 trip to Ethiopia where Wright served three months as a "transcedental meditation" teacher. Upon her return, Wright began to wear braids and was emotionally inspired by her three-week stay. Wright and Robertson wrote most of the songs with Ware arranging the music and production. Wright also sung her own background vocals with the only other vocal assistances being longtime Motown background vocalist Jim Gilstrap and Ware himself.

Ware, who was then known for his work with Quincy Jones and his composition, "I Wanna Be Where You Are", which became one of the first solo hits for Michael Jackson, had also been noted for his work with Marvin Gaye on his album, I Want You, as well as songs with Minnie Riperton on her album, Adventures in Paradise. Ware's productions were noted for its sensuality and he touched on some of the songs with Wright, including songs where the singer used her whistle register notes. The only song Wright didn't compose was the African-inspired "Tiki Tiki Donga", which was written by Robertson and Ware, with Wright reaching high notes in her vibrato. Other songs, such as the title track, "Rest Yourself", and "Don't Cry" were compositions solely by Wright and Robertson. Ware co-wrote music for the sexy ballad "I Too Am Wanting" and Ware and Wright co-wrote the funky "I Don't Know". The sole Wonder production, "Harmour Love", was included in the last minute. A planned photo shoot for the album cover was delayed due to Wright's work on her braids so to compensate, Motown hired a graphic artist to paint an image of the braided singer with her braids flying around her face. Wright was reassigned before the album's release to Tamla Records, which overlook many of her former husband's music.

== Reception ==
Professional ratings
Review scores
Source	Rating
Allmusic	3/5 stars

The album was released on February 9, 1977. Like Wright's previous two albums, the album didn't produce any commercial hits for her in the United States though Wright did find some chart action with "Harmour Love". The song was released as a single in 1975, in the United Kingdom where, fresh off the success of a similar song, "Your Kiss Is Sweet" (from Stevie Wonder Presents: Syreeta), the song reached number 32 in the UK Singles Chart in July. The single also reached number 75 on the R&B chart. Wright produced a video for the song, which featured her performing the song in a recording studio. The album was critically well-received upon its release. Later that year, Wright focused on duet work with singer G.C. Cameron on the album, Rich Love, Poor Love.

== Track listing ==
1. "One to One" (Syreeta Wright, Curtis Robertson Jr.) (4:50)
2. "I Don't Know" (Leon Ware, Wright) (4:22)
3. "Rest Yourself" (Wright, Robertson) (4:39)
4. "I Too Am Wanting" (Robertson, Wright, Ware) (5:38)
5. "Tiki Tiki Donga" (Robertson, Ware) (5:05)
6. "Don't Cry" (Wright, Robertson) (7:10)
7. "Harmour Love" (Wonder) (3:36)
8. "One to One" (reprise) (Wright, Robertson) (4:50)

== Personnel ==
- Produced by Leon Ware, Syreeta Wright, Stevie Wonder and Curtis Robertson Jr.
- Syreeta Wright – vocals, backing vocals
- Leon Ware, Jim Gilstrap, Marietta Araiza, Stevie Wonder – backing vocals
- Chuck Rainey, Curtis Robertson Jr. – bass guitar
- Curtis Robertson Jr. – acoustic bass
- David T. Walker, Greg Poree, Marc Silverman, Michael Sembello, Ray Parker Jr., Steve Buckmeier, Curtis Robertson Jr. – guitar
- Alvin Taylor, Howard King, James Gadson – drums
- Greg Phillinganes, John Barnes, Sonny Burke – keyboards
- Eddie "Bongo" Brown, Mayuto Correa – percussion
- Gary Bartz – saxophone on "I Don't Know" and "Don't Cry"
- David Blumberg – arrangements
- Stevie Wonder – arrangement on "Harmour Love"

== Charts ==
=== Singles ===
Year	Single	Chart positions
Year	Single	US R&B
1975	"Harmour Love"	75
