= You Can Do Anything =

Studio album by the Zutons
- Released: 2 June 2008
- Studio: Sunset Sound Recorders
- Genre: Indie rock
- Length: 48:58
- Label: Deltasonic
- Producer: George Drakoulias

The Zutons chronology
Tired of Hanging Around (2006)	You Can Do Anything (2008)	The Big Decider (2024)

You Can Do Anything is the third studio album by English rock band the Zutons. It was recorded at Sunset Sound Recorders in Los Angeles with producer George Drakoulias (the Black Crowes/Primal Scream/Tom Petty) and was released on Monday 2 June 2008 in the United Kingdom. You Can Do Anything was released after the departure of original lead guitarist Boyan Chowdhury, and is the first album to feature the band's new lead guitarist Paul Molloy. The album was also the band's last of their original timeline before quietly disbanding the following year, followed by a one-off reunion in 2016, before permanently reuniting in 2018 and releasing the comeback album in The Big Decider 2024.

== Background ==
The Zutons released their second studio album Tired of Hanging Around through Deltasonic in April 2006. musicOMH contributor John Murphy said that nearly "overnight, The Zutons shifted from quirky cult indie group to 'the band who wrote Valerie'" heightening the expectations for their next album.

== Composition and lyrics ==
AllMusic reviewer Stewart Mason said tracks such as "Family of Leeches" and "Bumbag" would "cement McCabe's reputation as a sly, cutting lyricist". The Guardian critic Ian Gittins wrote that Drakoulis' work on the album gave it a "layer of gritty blues" to the band's "skew-whiff psychedelia". He also mentioned that the Los Angeles sound shows through in Drakoulis' production. McCabe's voice was compared to that of Primal Scream frontman Bobby Gillespie, Mott the Hoople singer Ian Hunter and David Essex. Gittins found McCabe's "lewd, kitchen-sink lyrics [to] paint an increasingly delinquent picture of modern Britain".

"Harder and Harder" was compared to Supergrass and the mid-1990s work of Primal Scream when they were emulating the Rolling Stones. "Dirty Rat" is a ballad that The Independent music critic Andy Gill said was an "adulterer's mea culpa set to the first cousin of a Kaiser Chiefs melody". "What's Your Problem" was reminiscent of the sound of Reef. McCane and Harding duet on "You Could Make the Four Walls Cry", which recalled "Shine" (2007) by Take That. Murphy wrote that "Family of Leeches" has McCabe "secretly lusting after the mother of a family who seem to bear a resemblance to that of the Gallaghers" in Shameless. The country-esque "Don't Get Caught" recalled the Beach Boys during their Holland (1973) period. "Always Right Behind You" is a boogie-pop track that evoked "Reelin' In the Years" (1972) by Steely Dan. Murphy said "Freak" describes the "story of a gigolo telling tales of 'getting lovin' through money' and spilling the beans on his clients". The saxophone part in "Give Me a Reason" was done in the vein of Andy Mackay; it concludes with a funk rock coda section. The album's closing track, "Little Red Door", merged the sound of the Verve and Neil Young; Murphy said it had "Drakoulis' influence" all over it with its "slide guitar, mournful vocals and handclaps".

== Reception ==
Professional ratings
Aggregate scores
Source	Rating
Metacritic	70/100
Review scores
Source	Rating
AllMusic	4/5 stars
The Guardian	3/5 stars
The Independent	3/5 stars
MusicOMH	3/5 stars
NME	4/10
The Observer	4/5 stars
The Skinny	3/5 stars
The Times	3/5 stars
WOM magazin	3.5/5 stars
Yahoo! Launch	7/10 stars

You Can Do Anything was met with generally favourable reviews from music critics. At Metacritic, which assigns a normalized rating out of 100 to reviews from mainstream publications, the album received an average score of 66, based on nine reviews.

Several reviewers praised the songwriting. Mason said the combination of writer's block, Chowdhury leaving and the addition of Drakoulias meant it had "all the potential to be something of a train wreck". He was surprised then that the band "pulled themselves together to, somewhat unexpectedly, deliver the most concise, consistent, and commercial album they've made so far". The Skinny writer Neal Parsons thought that it had a "delightfully relaxed feel to it, with the group crafting songs which [...] occasionally stray[ed] beyond those origins". Jason Draper of Yahoo! Launch wrote that the band "somewhat reach back into their bag of who-knows-what, going some way to reminded us why they endeared themselves to us in the first place". The Observer's Craig McLean wrote that "true to form, this third record pootles around before, ultimately, achieving lift-off". The Fly writer Darren James noted that there was "less joyous freshness evident than on the previous two albums, but at times they hit some hugely high spots", such as the performances on "What's Your Problem". Gill wrote that the band's "difficult third album features another cast of flaky characters culled from the seedier corners of David McCabe's imagination, though the inevitable attrition means that none has quite the anthemic appeal of 'Valerie'".

Other critics were less receptive to the songwriting. Murphy felt that the tracks "here aren't amongst the strongest they've ever recorded" as they lacked the "immediacy of the ones on the band's first two albums". He summarised it as "not a bad record, but by The Zutons' own extremely high standards, it's a disappointment". Gavin Haynes of NME wrote that "Always Right Behind You" was indicative of the album as a whole: "lurching towards bell-curve-pleasing MOR frigidity in which retro has become repetition and songwriting has become aural plastering". Alex Fletcher of Digital Spy saw it as the "work of a band desperately striving to attain the next level of success, but falling short in nearly every instance. Drakoulias may have toned up some of the band's former flabbiness, but not even he can rein in their tendency to pursue wonky jam sessions instead of nailing down a killer tune". Victoria Segal of The Times compared it to "admiring a flower in somebody's lapel only to be squirted with water, a musical hand-buzzer concealed in the sweaty palm of each song". Record Collector's Terry Staunton felt that it "could have been released at any point in the last 40 years and it wouldn’t sound dated or out of place, but such era- and genre-hopping can be a double-edged sword". God Is in the TV writer Paul Cook said it stood "out for being stunningly average. Each track merges undetected into the next and before you realise you're halfway in and still searching for a belter of a track".

Some of them commented on McCabe's singing. BBC Music's Chris Jones wrote that the songs were "delivered with that great yearning scouse voice of Dave McCabe that helps overcome the overwhelming kitchen-sink squalor of it all sometimes". Fletcher said McCabe's "harsh, cigarette-stained vocals lack the nuance to deal the with the group's softer moments". Cook wrote that McCabe's vocals were "unvaried and only infrequently made better with the addition of Abi Harding's more exciting, refreshing voice making for a disappointing album on the whole with instances of under-explored brilliance". Haynes said that despite how "much he hollers, Dave McCabe can’t escape sounding bored, and his often-schoolboy lyrics have begun to actively jar" with the music.

The album was preceded by the first single "Always Right Behind You", which was released on 26 May 2008. It entered the Official UK Albums Chart at No. 6.

== Track listing ==
You Can Do Anything track listing
No.	Title	Length
1.	"Harder and Harder"	3:46
2.	"Dirty Rat"	4:01
3.	"What's Your Problem"	3:56
4.	"You Could Make the Four Walls Cry"	3:32
5.	"Family of Leeches"	4:01
6.	"Don't Get Caught"	3:20
7.	"Bumbag"	4:33
8.	"Always Right Behind You"	3:29
9.	"Put a Little Aside"	3:59
10.	"Freak"	4:21
11.	"Give Me a Reason"	6:38
12.	"Little Red Door"	3:22

iTunes bonus tracks
No.	Title	Length
13.	"Pull the Plug"
14.	"Desert Shoot" (Video, iTunes pre-order only)

== Personnel ==
- Dave McCabe – lead vocals, guitar
- Paul Molloy – guitar, piano, vocals, cigarbox guitar, keyboards
- Russell Pritchard – bass, acoustic guitar, winebox bass, vocals
- Sean Payne – drums, percussion, vocals
- Abi Harding – alto, tenor and baritone saxophone

== Charts ==
Chart performance for You Can Do Anything
Chart (2008)	Peak position
Irish Albums (IRMA)	24
UK Albums (Official Charts)	6
