= Bundle of Joy (album) =

Studio album by Freddie Hubbard
- Released: 1977
- Recorded: 1977
- Genre: Jazz
- Label: Columbia
- Producer: Bert de Coteaux

Freddie Hubbard chronology
| Windjammer (1976) | Bundle of Joy (1977) | Super Blue (1978) |

Professional ratings
Review scores
| Source | Rating |
|---|---|
| Allmusic | 1.5/5 stars |

Bundle of Joy is an album recorded in 1977 by jazz trumpeter Freddie Hubbard. It was released on the Columbia label and features performances by Hubbard, Dorothy Ashby, Azar Lawrence and Ernie Watts.

== Track listing ==
All compositions by Freddie Hubbard except as indicated

1. "Bundle of Joy"
2. "Rainy Day Song"
3. "Portrait of Jennie" (Gordon Burdge, J. Russel Robinson)
4. "From Now On"
5. "Tucson Stomp"
6. "Rahsann"
7. "I Don't Want to Lose You" (Thom Bell, Linda Creed)
8. "From Behind"

== Personnel ==
- Freddie Hubbard: trumpet
- Bobby Bryant: trumpet
- Snooky Young: trumpet
- Nolan Smith: trumpet
- George Bohanon: trombone
- Garnett Brown: trombone
- Ernie Watts: tenor saxophone, alto saxophone
- Azar Lawrence: tenor saxophone
- David Garfield: keyboards, celeste
- Michael Stanton: keyboards
- Dorothy Ashby: harp
- Bill Green: tenor saxophone
- David Sherr: oboe
- Ernie Fields: baritone saxophone
- David T. Walker: guitar
- Craig McMullen: guitar
- Jay Graydon: guitar
- Rick Littlefield: guitar
- Henry Davis: bass
- Curtis Robertson Jr.: bass
- Eric Ward: bass
- Carlos Vega: drums
- Ed Greene: drums
- Freddy Alexander: drums
- Tommy Vig: percussion
- Bob Zimmitti: percussion
- Paulinho da Costa: conga
- Dee Ervin, Maxine Willard Waters, Venetta Fields, Julia Tillman-Waters, Pat Henderson: vocals

== Charts ==
Chart performance for Bundle of Joy
| Chart (1977) | Peak position |
|---|---|
| US Billboard 200 | 145 |
