= The Cellar Door Sessions 1970 =

Box set by Miles Davis
- Released: December 27, 2005
- Recorded: December 16–19, 1970
- Venues: The Cellar Door; Georgetown, Washington, D.C.
- Genres: Jazz fusion; funk
- Length: 5:52:04
- Label: Columbia/Legacy
- Producer: Teo Macero

Miles Davis live box set chronology
In Person Friday and Saturday Nights at the Blackhawk, Complete (2003)	The Cellar Door Sessions 1970 (2005)

Miles Davis live chronology
Miles at the Fillmore – Miles Davis 1970: The Bootleg Series Vol. 3 (1970)	The Cellar Door Sessions 1970 (1970)	In Concert (1972)

Professional ratings
Review scores
Source	Rating
AllMusic	5/5 stars
Pitchfork	9.4/10
Rolling Stone	4.5/5 stars
The Penguin Guide to Jazz Recordings	3/4 stars

The Cellar Door Sessions 1970 is a boxed live album released in 2005. It compiles six of ten sets that were performed over four December nights in 1970 at the D. C. nightclub the Cellar Door. Despite similar formatting, it is not a part of the Miles Davis Series of box sets.

Significant portions of Davis' Live-Evil were edited and compiled from the music that appears on discs 5 and 6. The sections labelled "Improvisation" into "Inamorata" are most commonly known as "Funky Tonk," but were released on Live-Evil as "Inamorata and Narration by Conrad Roberts."

Live-Evil and this collection are the only official recordings of John McLaughlin's live performances with Miles Davis.

== Track listing ==
Columbia and Legacy – C6K 93614

All tracks are written by Miles Davis unless otherwise noted.

Disc one: Wednesday, December 16 (first set)
No.	Title	Writer(s)	Length
1.	"Directions"	Josef Zawinul	8:55
2.	"Yesternow"		17:05
3.	"What I Say"		13:10
4.	"Improvisation #1"	Keith Jarrett	4:29
5.	"Inamorata"		14:00
Total length:			57:39

Disc two: Thursday, December 17 (second set)
No.	Title	Writer(s)	Length
1.	"What I Say"		13:33
2.	"Honky Tonk"		20:00
3.	"It's About That Time"		14:41
4.	"Improvisation #2"	Jarrett	6:39
5.	"Inamorata"		14:33
6.	"Sanctuary"	Wayne Shorter	0:30
Total length:			1:09:56

Disc three: Friday, December 18 (second set)
No.	Title	Writer(s)	Length
1.	"Directions"	Zawinul	13:11
2.	"Honky Tonk"		18:32
3.	"What I Say"		15:09
Total length:			46:52

Disc four: Friday, December 18 (third set)
No.	Title	Writer(s)	Length
1.	"Directions"	Zawinul	11:53
2.	"Honky Tonk"		17:01
3.	"What I Say"		14:12
4.	"Sanctuary"	Shorter	2:04
5.	"Improvisation #3"	Jarrett	5:05
6.	"Inamorata"		15:14
Total length:			1:05:29

Disc five: Saturday, December 19 (second set)
No.	Title	Writer(s)	Length
1.	"Directions"	Zawinul	15:09
2.	"Honky Tonk"		20:49
3.	"What I Say"		21:31
Total length:			59:29

Disc six: Saturday, December 19 (third set)
No.	Title	Writer(s)	Length
1.	"Directions"	Zawinul	19:05
2.	"Improvisation #4"	Jarrett	5:04
3.	"Inamorata"		18:28
4.	"Sanctuary"	Shorter	2:13
5.	"It's About That Time"		7:49
Total length:			52:39

== Personnel ==
- Miles Davis – electric trumpet with wah-wah
- Gary Bartz – soprano and alto sax, flute
- Keith Jarrett – Fender Rhodes electric piano, Fender Contempo organ
- Michael Henderson – electric bass
- Jack DeJohnette – drums
- Airto Moreira – percussion, cuica (CDs 2, 3, 4, 5, 6)

Guest musician

- John McLaughlin – electric guitar (CDs 5, 6 only)
