= Curtis Robertson Jr. =

American bassist, guitarist and songwriter

Curtis Robertson Jr. (born 1953) is an American bassist, guitarist and songwriter. He was once married to former Motown singer Syreeta, the former wife of Stevie Wonder. Curtis was influential in the development of Syreeta's music and recorded and co-wrote music with Syreeta.

Curtis also toured with the Les McCann/Eddie Harris Band, Robben Ford, Maxine Weldon, Steve Hillage, Randy Crawford, Gary Bartz, Gladys Knight and recorded with Bobby "Blue" Bland, Gary Bartz, Freddie Hubbard, David T. Walker, and Richard Thompson.

Between 1990 and 2005, Curtis was the bassist for Lou Rawls. Like with Syreeta, he helped shape the music for which Rawls would become known.

Curtis lives in the Los Angeles area where he freelances as a musician. He is currently a member of vocalist Nailah Porter's band and also the hard bop CJS Quintet.

== Discography ==
With Gary Bartz

- Love Song (Vee-Jay International, 1977)

With Willie Bobo

- Tomorrow Is Here (Blue Note, 1977)

With Freddie Hubbard

- Bundle of Joy (Columbia, 1977)

With Syreeta Wright

- One to One (Tamla, 1977)
