= The Big Decider =

Studio album by the Zutons
- Released: 26 April 2024
- Studio: Abbey Road (London); Rockfield (Monmouthshire); Headbang (Liverpool); The Motor Museum (Liverpool); Coastal Sound (Liverpool); Decoy (Woodbridge)
- Length: 35:31
- Label: Icepop
- Producer: Ian Broudie; Sean Payne; Nile Rodgers

The Zutons chronology
You Can Do Anything (2008)	The Big Decider (2024)

The Big Decider is the fourth studio album by English rock band the Zutons, released on 26 April 2024 through Icepop. It is the band's first album in 16 years, following You Can Do Anything (2008), their disbandment the following year, and reformation in 2018. The album was produced by Ian Broudie, Nile Rodgers, and band member Sean Payne; further, it was promoted with a tour of the UK in early 2024. It received generally positive reviews from critics.

== Critical reception ==
Professional ratings
Aggregate scores
Source	Rating
Metacritic	80/100
Review scores
Source	Rating
Clash	8/10
Classic Rock	7/10
Mojo	4/5 stars
MusicOMH	3.5/5 stars

The Big Decider received a score of 80 out of 100 on review aggregator Metacritic based on four critics' reviews, which the website categorised as "generally favorable" reception. Classic Rock felt that the album "sees the Zutons back to their happy clapping playful best", while Mojo called it "uplifting, rueful and expertly crafted".

Emma Harrison of Clash described it as "a real statement of intent" as well as "an absolute suckerpunch of an album which reflects the love and chemistry the band and the collaborators have for each other". Ben Hogwood of MusicOMH wrote that the nine songs display "the band's leaner approach, but they show that McCabe's eye for a memorable song remains", but "their songs are not – yet – quite as memorable as those from the band's first iteration".

== Track listing ==
All tracks are written by Dave McCabe, Abi Harding, and Sean Payne; "In Your Arms" written with Ian Broudie; "Disappear", "The Big Decider", and "Rise" written with Neil Bradley..

The Big Decider – Standard edition
No.	Title	Producer(s)	Length
1.	"Creeping on the Dancefloor"	Nile Rodgers	4:29
2.	"Pauline"	Sean Payne	3:57
3.	"Water"	Payne	3:36
4.	"In Your Arms"	Ian Broudie	3:43
5.	"Disappear"	Rodgers; Payne^{[a]}	5:06
6.	"Company"	Rodgers	3:59
7.	"The Big Decider"	Broudie	3:28
8.	"Rise"	Payne	3:55
9.	"Best of Me"	Rodgers; Payne^{[a]}	3:18
Total length:			35:31

The Big Decider – Deluxe edition
No.	Title	Length
10.	"In Your Arms" (Live)	4:21
11.	"Pauline" (Live)	4:23
12.	"Disappear" (Live)	5:23
13.	"Company" (Live)	4:05
14.	"Water" (Live)	3:46
15.	"Best of Me" (Live)	3:53
16.	"The Big Decider" (Live)	3:19
17.	"Rise" (Live)	3:52
18.	"Creeping on the Dancefloor" (Live)	5:09

Note

- ^{^[a]} signifies an additional producer

== Personnel ==
- Dave McCabe – vocals, acoustic guitars, electric guitars (all tracks); synthesizer (track 5), screwdriver guitars (6, 8), slide guitar (9)
- Abi Harding – backing vocals (all tracks), saxophone (tracks 2–9)
- Sean Payne – drums, percussion (all tracks); backing vocals (tracks 1–5, 7–9), additional recording (2, 3, 7–9), bass guitar (5, 9), additional keyboards (5), additional engineering (6), acoustic guitar (8, 9)
- Neil Bradley – keyboards (tracks 1–5, 7–9), piano (1, 5, 9), backing vocals (1), electric piano (6)
- Jay Lewis – bass guitar (tracks 1, 6, 8), backing vocals (1), lead guitar (2–8), claps (7)
- Boyan Chowdhury – guitar, backing vocals (track 1)
- Tim Cunningham – bass guitar (tracks 2–4, 7)
- Ian Broudie – backing vocals (tracks 4, 7)
- Ben Truman – strings (tracks 4, 7)
- Russell Graham – additional keyboards (tracks 5, 6)
- Nile Rodgers – speech (track 5)

Technical

- Nick Watson – mastering
- Mike Crossey – mixing (track 1)
- Stephen Harris – mixing (tracks 2–9), recording (2–4, 7)
- Leon Pearce – mixing (tracks 10–19)
- Russell Graham – recording (tracks 1, 5, 6, 9)
- Joe Rubel – recording (track 9)
- Tom Roach – additional recording (tracks 5, 6)
- John Barrett – additional engineering (tracks 5, 6)
- Andy Maxwell – recording assistance (tracks 1, 5, 6, 9)
- Jack Boston – recording assistance (tracks 2–4, 7)

Visuals

- Scott Jones Studio – art direction, design
- Graham Blackburn – live photography

== Charts ==
Chart performance for The Big Decider
Chart (2024)	Peak position
Scottish Albums (OCC)	8
UK Albums (OCC)	7
UK Independent Albums (OCC)	1
