= The Blues Chronicles: Tales of Life =

Studio album by Gary Bartz
- Released: 1996
- Genre: Jazz
- Label: Atlantic
- Producer: Gary Bartz, Eulis Cathey, Don Hillegas

Gary Bartz chronology
Alto Memories (1995)	The Blues Chronicles: Tales of Life (1996)	Live @ the Jazz Standard, Vol. 1: Soulstice (1999)

The Blues Chronicles: Tales of Life is an album by the American musician Gary Bartz, released in 1996. It is a concept album about the history of the blues. Bartz supported the album with live dates and festival appearances.

== Production ==
Bartz was backed by James King on bass, Tom Williams on trumpet, George Colligan on piano, and Greg Bandy on drums. Jon Hendricks sang on "Come with Me". Cyrus Chestnut played piano on a few tracks. Russell Malone played guitar on "One Million Blues". Bartz drew on memories of his Baltimore childhood in composing many of the songs. He recorded neighborhood folks for some of the "Hustler's Holler" tracks. "Lively Up Yourself" is a cover of the Bob Marley song. "Miss Otis Regrets" is an interpretation of the Cole Porter song. "And He Called Himself a Messenger" is a tribute to Art Blakey and the Jazz Messengers. "The Song of Loving-Kindness" was inspired by a Buddhist chant.

== Critical reception ==
Professional ratings
Review scores
Source	Rating
AllMusic	4/5 stars
The Buffalo News	4/5 stars
MusicHound Jazz: The Essential Album Guide	2/5 stars

The Vancouver Sun said that "Bartz, playing mostly alto, burns and moans throughout the record"; the paper later listed The Blues Chronicles: Tales of Life as the second best jazz album of 1996. The Ottawa Citizen noted that "from funk to rock to down-home blues to reggae to swing, Bartz's band tackles his compositions with across-the-board abandon." The Pittsburgh Post-Gazette stated that Bartz has "a big, dense sound and excellent technique [and] can tell a story of some depth—a twister-like, wailing uptempo tale, or a romantic but unsentimental ballad." Entertainment Weekly considered The Blues Chronicles: Tales of Life to be one of the best jazz albums of the year.

== Track listing ==
No.	Title	Length
1.	"Come with Me/Hustler's Holler 1"
2.	"The Five Dollar Theory"
3.	"Makes Me Wanna Moan"
4.	"Miss Otis Regrets"
5.	"One Million Blues"
6.	"Hustler's Holler 2"
7.	"And He Called Himself a Messenger"
8.	"Band in the U.S.A."
9.	"Hustler's Holler 3"
10.	"A Looney Tune"
11.	"Lively Up Yourself"
12.	"Gangsta Jazz"
13.	"Passage – Part I"
14.	"The Song of Loving-Kindness"
15.	"Hustler's Holler (Song of the Streets)"
