= Another Earth (album) =

Studio album by Gary Bartz
- Released: 1969
- Recorded: June 19 & 25, 1968
- Genre: Jazz
- Label: Milestone; MSP 9018
- Producer: Orrin Keepnews

Gary Bartz chronology
Libra (1968)	Another Earth (1969)	Home! (1970)

Another Earth is the second album by saxophonist Gary Bartz, recorded in 1968 and released on the Milestone label.

== Reception ==
Professional ratings
Review scores
Source	Rating
AllMusic	4/5 stars
The Rolling Stone Jazz Record Guide	2/5 stars

Scott Yanow of AllMusic commented that "this adventurous music is quite colorful and always holds one's interest".

== Track listing ==
All compositions by Gary Bartz except as indicated

1. "Another Earth" - 23:50
2. "Dark Nebula" - 5:07
3. "UFO" - 4:52
4. "Lost in the Stars" (Kurt Weill) - 4:06
5. "Perihelion and Aphelion" - 3:48

== Personnel ==
- Gary Bartz - alto saxophone
- Charles Tolliver - trumpet (track 1)
- Pharoah Sanders - tenor saxophone (track 1)
- Stanley Cowell - piano
- Reggie Workman - bass
- Freddie Waits - drums
