= Libra (Gary Bartz album) =

Studio album by Gary Bartz Quintet
- Released: 1968
- Recorded: May 31 and June 15, 1967; Plaza Sound, New York City
- Genre: Jazz
- Label: Milestone; MSP 9006
- Producer: Orrin Keepnews

Gary Bartz chronology
Libra (1968)	Another Earth (1969)

Libra is the debut album by saxophonist Gary Bartz' Quintet, recorded in 1967 and released on the Milestone label.

== Reception ==
Professional ratings
Review scores
Source	Rating
AllMusic	2.5/5 stars
The Rolling Stone Jazz Record Guide	3/5 stars

Michael G. Nastos of AllMusic wrote: "Featured are excellent compositions and playing in mainstream mode... This is the more lyrical side of Bartz".

== Track listing ==
All compositions by Gary Bartz except as indicated

1. "Eastern Blues" - 3:58
2. "Disjunction" - 7:10
3. "Cabin in the Sky" (John La Touche, Vernon Duke) - 3:59
4. "Air and Fire" - 5:52
5. "Libra" - 6:22
6. "Bloomdido" (Charlie Parker) - 4:46
7. "Deep River" (Traditional) - 4:51
8. "Freedom One Day" - 5:06

== Personnel ==
- Gary Bartz - alto saxophone
- Jimmy Owens - flugelhorn (tracks 1, 3, 4 & 6–8), trumpet (tracks 2, 5 & 8)
- Albert Dailey - piano
- Richard Davis - bass
- Billy Higgins - drums
