= Shadows (Gary Bartz album) =

Studio album by Gary Bartz
- Released: 1992
- Recorded: June 11–12, 1991
- Studio: Clinton Sound, New York
- Genre: Jazz
- Length: 69:25
- Label: Timeless; SJP 379
- Producer: Russ Musto

Gary Bartz chronology
| There Goes the Neighborhood! (1991) | Shadows (1992) | Episode One: Children of Harlem (1994) |

Shadows is an album by saxophonist Gary Bartz, recorded in 1991 and released on the Dutch Timeless label.

== Reception ==
Professional ratings
Review scores
| Source | Rating |
|---|---|
| AllMusic | 3/5 stars |
| Tom Hull | B+ |

Greg Turner of AllMusic wrote that "Bartz's strong tone, sense of swing, and improvisational imagination place him within the ranks of jazz's finest saxophonists, and he proves it throughout this recording... Shadows is an excellent addition to Bartz's extensive discography".

== Track listing ==
1. "Marion's Theme" (John Williams) - 9:49
2. "Shadows" (Gary Bartz) - 12:30
3. "Song of the Underground Railroad" (John Coltrane) - 10:25
4. "Peresina" (McCoy Tyner) - 14:35
5. "How Do You Keep the Music Playing?" (Alan and Marilyn Bergman, Michel Legrand) - 4:50
6. "Children of the Night" (Wayne Shorter) - 9:32
7. "Holiday for Strings" (David Rose) - 7:41

== Personnel ==
- Gary Bartz - alto saxophone, soprano saxophone
- Willie Williams - tenor saxophone
- Benny Green - piano
- Christian McBride - bass
- Victor Lewis - drums
