= Juju Street Songs =

Studio album by Gary Bartz NTU Troop
- Released: 1972
- Recorded: October 1972
- Studio: Fantasy, Berkeley, California
- Genre: Jazz
- Label: Prestige; P 10057
- Producer: Gary Bartz

Gary Bartz chronology
Harlem Bush Music (1971)	Juju Street Songs (1972)	Follow, The Medicine Man (1973)

Juju Street Songs is an album by saxophonist Gary Bartz's NTU Troop, recorded in 1972 and released on the Prestige label.

== Reception ==
Professional ratings
Review scores
Source	Rating
AllMusic	4/5 stars
The Rolling Stone Jazz Record Guide	5/5 stars

AllMusic said, "Excellent from start to finish, this LP captures Bartz at the height of his creativity".

== Track listing ==
All compositions by Gary Bartz except as indicated

1. "I Wanna Be Where You Are" (Arthur Ross, Leon Ware) - 10:04
2. "Black Maybe" (Stevie Wonder) - 9:32
3. "Bertha Baptist" (Stafford James) - 6:32
4. "Africans Unite" - 6:28
5. "Teheran" - 8:20

== Personnel ==
- Gary Bartz - alto saxophone, soprano saxophone, sopranino saxophone, voice, electric piano, percussion
- Andy Bey - vocals, electric piano, percussion
- Stafford James - bass, electric bass, voice, percussion
- Howard King - drums, voice, percussion
