= Love Song (Gary Bartz album) =

Studio album by Gary Bartz
- Released: 1977
- Recorded: 1977
- Studio: Sage and Sound, Hollywood, CA
- Genre: Jazz
- Length: 37:23
- Label: Vee-Jay; VJS 3068
- Producer: Gary Bartz

Gary Bartz chronology
Love Affair (1977)	Love Song (1977)	Bartz (1967)

Love Song is an album by saxophonist Gary Bartz released by the Vee-Jay label in 1977.

== Reception ==
Professional ratings
Review scores
Source	Rating
AllMusic	3/5 stars

AllMusic reviewer Scott Yanow stated "A reasonably enjoyable but not essential release, this album features altoist Gary Bartz (doubling on soprano) performing some originals and older R&B tunes with a four-piece rhythm section ... The music overall is generally danceable and funky, sounding a bit dated despite some decent solos. Not Gary Bartz's worst (from a jazz standpoint), but also far from his best".

== Track listing ==
1. "Love Song" (Gary Bartz) – 6:35
2. "Prelude and Lonely Girl" (Leon Carr, Earl Shuman) – 5:50
3. "Interlude and Don't Stop Now" (Eddie Holman, James Soloman) – 6:55
4. "You" (Jeffrey Bowen, Jack Goga, Ivy Jo Hunter) – 7:35
5. "Interlude and Just Suppose" (George Cables) – 8:55
6. "Afterthoughts" (Bartz) – 1:30

== Personnel ==
- Gary Bartz – alto saxophone, soprano saxophone, vocals
- George Cables – keyboards
- Carl McDaniels – guitar
- Curtis Robertson – bass
- Howard King – drums
- Rita Greene – lead vocals (tracks 1 & 5)
