= Harlem Bush Music =

Compilation album by Gary Bartz NTU Troop
- Released: 1997
- Recorded: November 19 and 23, 1970, and January 1971
- Studio: Decca, New York City
- Genre: Jazz-funk
- Length: 76:45
- Label: Milestone
- Producer: Orrin Keepnews

Gary Bartz chronology
Home! (1970)	Harlem Bush Music (1997)	Juju Street Songs (1972)

Harlem Bush Music is a compilation of two albums by saxophonist Gary Bartz NTU Troop, recorded in 1970 and 1971 and released on the Milestone label.

== Reception ==
Professional ratings
Review scores
Source	Rating
AllMusic	4/5 stars
Muzik	9/10
The Rolling Stone Jazz Record Guide	3/5 stars

Ronnie D. Lankford Jr. of AllMusic wrote: "How one finally looks at Harlem Bush Music -- is it music, politics, or something in between -- matters less than understanding the time and place that it was made. And whether one ultimately finds these efforts by the Gary Bartz Ntu Troop satisfying or tiring matters less than appreciating the adventurous spirit that went into making them". All About Jazz stated: "Harlem Bush Music remains extremely relevant. Though the album came at a time when Black Consciousness and Black Pride were coming to the fore of American culture, current times are such that its message of struggle, love and hope transcends racial categories. That is both a great testament to the power of this music, as well as to the dawning fact in this country that we're all in this together".

== Track listing ==
All compositions by Gary Bartz except as indicated

1. "Rise" – 5:28
2. "People Dance" – 10:35
3. "Du (Rain)" – 4:17
4. "Drinking Song" (Gary Bartz, Maxine Bartz) – 5:17
5. "Taifa" (Gary Bartz, Maxine Bartz) – 4:21
6. "Parted" (Paul Laurence Dunbar) – 2:04
7. "The Warriors' Song" – 6:09
8. "Blue (A Folk Tale)" – 18:05
9. "Uhuru Sasa" – 6:48
10. "Vietcong" (Hakim Jami) – 5:16
11. "Celestial Blues" (Andy Bey) – 7:34
12. "The Planets" – 5:08
- Originally released as Harlem Bush Music: Taifa on Milestone 9031 (tracks 1–7) and Harlem Bush Music: Uhuru on Milestone 9032 (tracks 8–12).

== Personnel ==
- Gary Bartz – alto saxophone, soprano saxophone, vocals, narration, piano
- Andy Bey – vocals (tracks 1–5)
- Juni Booth (tracks 1–7 & 10), Ron Carter (tracks 8, 9, 11 & 12) – bass, electric bass
- Harold White – drums
- Nat Bettis – percussion
