= Tired of Hanging Around =

Studio album by the Zutons
- Released: 17 April 2006
- Recorded: 2005
- Studios: Olympic, Townhouse (London)
- Genres: Northern soul; rock; indie pop
- Length: 40:29
- Label: Deltasonic
- Producer: Stephen Street

The Zutons chronology
Who Killed the Zutons? (2004)	Tired of Hanging Around (2006)	You Can Do Anything (2008)

Singles from Tired of Hanging Around
- 1. "Why Won't You Give Me Your Love?" Released: 3 April 2006; 2. "Valerie" Released: 19 June 2006; 3. "Oh Stacey (Look What You've Done!)" Released: 18 September 2006; 4. "It's the Little Things We Do" Released: 27 November 2006

Tired of Hanging Around is the second studio album by the British rock band The Zutons, released in the UK on 17 April 2006. Produced by Stephen Street, the album was recorded at Townhouse and Olympic Studios in 2005. The album charted at 2 on the UK album charts.

== Background ==
By October 2004, the band had accumulated ten tracks for their second album. In February 2005, McCabe said the band had been making demos using MiniDisc during their touring schedule.

Tired of Hanging Around was recorded in late 2005 with producer Stephen Street in London, who was known for working with Britpop acts. McCabe thought it was "good for him [to work with us] cause he must be sick of the pork pie hats and all that. I don’t not like British music, but I’m not into that whole London thing [... so] it’s probably good for him to do a band like the Zutons cause we’re not really like anything else in Britain". During this, they performed at Iceland Airwaves festival in October 2005.

== Composition and lyrics ==
=== Overview ===
Musically, the sound of Tired of Hanging Around has been described as Northern soul, rock and indie pop. Pete Cashmore of NME said the songs could be divided into two sets: "'feeling threatened' and 'being threatening'. The former camp houses the melodically gorgeous," such as "Tired of Hanging Around" and "Someone Watching Over Me". The second group, meanwhile, featured "Oh Stacey (Look What You've Done!)" and "You've Got a Friend in Me". The Guardian writer Mat Snow said the Zutons' "stylistic palette has moved on to 1972 (imagine early Roxy Music without [Bryan] Ferry or [Brian] Eno); the drums have punch, the instrumental textures a rounded warmth, and the band work hard to accentuate the songs with telling detail and ear-catching hooks".

Tired of Hanging Around featured less guitarwork and more saxophone, courtesy of member Abi Harding. The Phoenix writer Brian E. King said McCabe's voice fluctuated between that of U2 frontman Bono and Soundgarden singer Chris Cornell, while Snow thought it sat between Take That's Robbie Williams and Paul Heaton of the Beautiful South, "sound[ing like] a troubled soul, expressing frustration and dyspepsia in cleverly written kitchen-sink fantasies". McCabe explained that many of the album's songs were "about giving yourself a bit of a hard time [...] 'cause you've gone out and got drunk or let someone down". He mentioned that several of them were influenced by promoting Who Killed...... The Zutons? on tour; "Valerie" and "Oh Stacey (Look What You've Done!)" in particular were inspired by the band meeting people when they supported Keane and Muse.

=== Tracks ===
The album's opening track, "Tired of Hanging Around", was written by McCabe while on a plane in the US, tackling the theme of transportation: "waiting for someone to pick you up and they don’t turn up on time [...] and people that are "being ignorant when they do turn up, [coming] with attitudes and bringing it with them". PopMatters contributor Michael Keefe wrote that it is a story of "anxiety in a fast-paced world [that] pivots around an actual bus", reminiscent of the Teardrop Explodes. McCabe explained that it was described being at a bus stop waiting for someone that's "ignoring you – and getting annoyed about not being taken seriously". "It's the Little Things We Do" discusses dealing with a hangover, drawing comparison to the work of the Bees. The intro section to "Valerie" was borrowed from "Everybody Wants to Rule the World" (1985) by Tears for Fears. "Someone Watching Over Me" has a gospel-country atmosphere that evoked the work of the Rolling Stones. "Secrets" is akin to the sound of the Shangri-Las.

"Why Won't You Give Me Your Love?" merges glam rock with pop-punk, earning a comparison to "Tiger Feet" (1974) by Mud. musicOMH contributor John Murphy wrote that it initially seemed to be a "conventional lover's plea. On closer inspection though, it's got black humour stamped right through it, with McCabe telling tales of locking his intended in a cellar and feeding her rodent hair". "Oh Stacey (Look What You've Done!)" describes a daughter using her dead father's money for alcohol, and was compared to "Too Much Too Young" (1980) by the Specials. "You've Got a Friend in Me" is a duet between McCabe and Harding, detailing the perspective of a stalker following a victim, echoing "You Keep It All In" (1989) by the Beautiful South. The album's closing track, "I Know I'll Never Leave", is a homage to the band's hometown of Liverpool; Nick Hasted of Uncut said the song was about a "private dystopia in which the singer’s trapped inside a ghetto flat with floors that slash his skin". The song overall was Led Zeppelin-esque, while one of its verse sections recalled "Ain't No Sunshine" (1971) by Bill Withers.

== Release ==
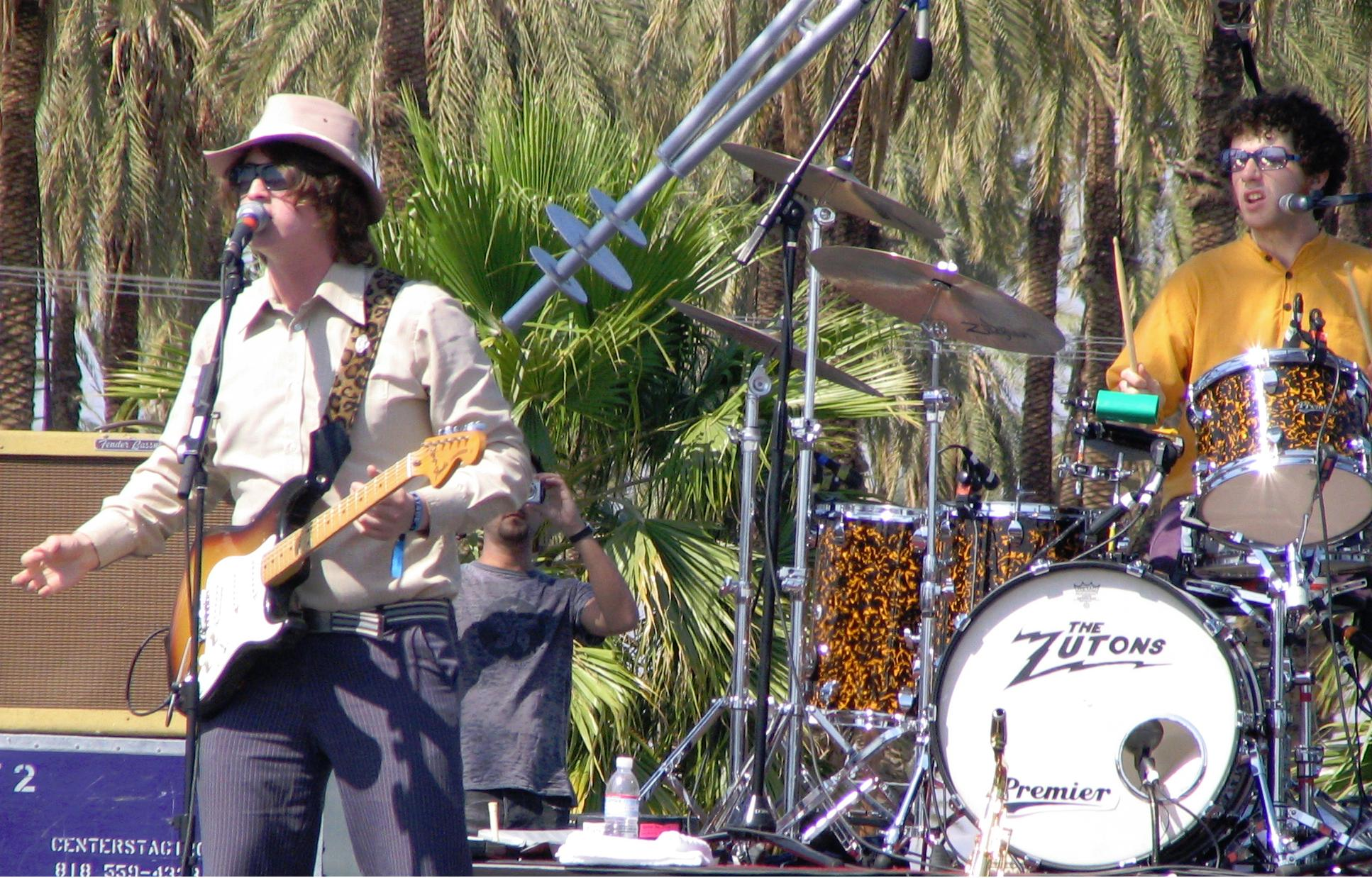
The Zutons toured throughout 2006 for Tired of Hanging Around.

In November and December 2005, the Zutons played a small series of shows in the UK. On 26 January 2006, Tired of Hanging Around was announced for released in three months' time. Two weeks later, the band appeared at the KOKO venue in London for a one-off show as part of the NME Awards, where they played six songs from their forthcoming album. In March 2006, the band performed at the South by Southwest music conference in Austin, Texas. "Why Won't You Give Me Your Love?" was released as a single on 3 April 2006. Tired of Hanging Around was released on 17 April 2006. To promote it, the band embarked on a tour of the UK in May 2006. "Valerie" was released as a single on 19 June 2006; the seven-inch vinyl version included "Get Up and Dance". Two versions were released on CD: the first with "April Fool" and the second with "I Will Be Your Pockets", "In the City" and the music video for "Valerie".

Preceded by a show at the Hammersmith Apollo in London, they appeared at various festivals over the next few months, including Creamfields, Latitude, T in the Park, Wakestock and Wireless. Tired of Hanging Around was released in the US through Columbia on 22 August 2006. "Oh Stacey (Look What You've Done!)" was released as a single on 18 September 2006. They promoted this with appearances at The Secret Policeman's Ball and BBC Radio 2 Electric Proms festivals in October 2006. "It's the Little Things We Do" was released as a single on 27 November 2006. They intended to close out the year with two performances at the Roundhouse venue in London, until this was expanded into a UK tour covering November and December 2006. The show in Brighton was originally cancelled as Payne suffered from a viral infection, though was then moved to the end of the tour.

== Critical reception ==
Professional ratings
Aggregate scores
Source	Rating
Metacritic	70/100
Review scores
Source	Rating
AllMusic	3.5/5 stars
Gigwise	6/10 stars
MusicOMH	4/5 stars
NME	7/10
The Observer	3/5 stars
The Phoenix	2.5/4 stars
Playlouder	3/5 stars
PopMatters	8/10
Uncut	3/5 stars
Yahoo! Launch	4/10 stars

Tired of Hanging Around was met with generally favourable reviews from music critics. At Metacritic, which assigns a normalized rating out of 100 to reviews from mainstream publications, the album received an average score of 70, based on 19 reviews.

Critics largerly praised the songwriting. Cashmore called it "one seriously pissed-off, paranoid, twitchy record". The Observer's Rosie Swash wrote that it was "reassuringly familiar" as the "preference for substance over style that ensures Tired... puts their modish peers to shame". Emily Mackay of Playlouder referred to it as an "assured, almost cocky album, as if they've just located the sports button on what was formerly a reliable family estate of a band". AllMusic reviewer Sharon Mawer wrote that it was "even more assured" than its predecessor, "not that they had changed much -- they really didn't need to, for there was no one making music quite like the Zutons". Murphy, meanwhile, saw it as "delightfully quirky, original and catchy as its predecessor, whilst also representing something of a leap forward", adding that it was "commercial enough to also rope in some new admirers". Keefe wrote the band's varied influences "all congeal together in perfect proportions on this great sophomore release". Gigwise writer Chris Taylor said that despite it coming across as a group "struggling to shake off the pressures of following up the far-reaching success of their debut," the follow-up features "enough decent songs to offer hope for the future".

Some commentators highlighted Street's production work. Murphy wrote that Street "helps to shape a big, positive feel to the album"; Mackay said this extended to Chowdhury's guitarwork, as it tries to "channel the spirit" of Led Zeppelin guitarist Jimmy Page, and to McCabe's vocals. Alternative Press writer Erick Haight said Street's "crisp production keeps things smooth, yet big and ballsy, even if Abi Harding’s gritty sax takes a few steps back in the process". Taylor noted that while the production was "turned up to 'big rock' levels," it only "succeeds in sounding a little hollow. The energy of the song when put in the context of a pumping Zutons live set is lost on record". Gill was similarly let down by Street, "who does his usual solid, if unspectacular production job here", despite the poor writing, which Stephen Ackroyd agree with as the "quirky edges have all been rounded off".

Other reviewers were mixed on the songwriting. Ackroyd said that after the opening three songs, he was "yawning. Not just a little bit; Night Nurse never worked so well [...] somewhere the strangely endearing moments of the band’s debut have gone missing". Noel Murray of The A.V. Club wrote that the Zutons went for the "big punch on album number two, and the result sounds like glam-rock without the glam—and pretty thin to boot, in spite of a preponderance of instrumentation". King felt there was not enough quality songwriting to "make Tired of Hanging Around anything approaching a classic. But it’s evidence that there’s life left in this little band". Hasted said that "little has changed" as the band continue to stay "four-square and a little flat. The boundary-trampling spirit that makes their music stretch out almost infinitely live remains barely tapped". Yahoo! Launch's Jamie Gill wrote that it was "tired and tiring", that "small-minded whinging is the major characteristic of the album" from the first song onward, adding that it did not have "enough ideas or songs to make up for the overwhelmingly mean perspective" of the lyrics.

== Track listing ==
All tracks by David McCabe and the Zutons except for tracks 5, 6 and 8 adding Sean Payne.

No.	Title	Length
1.	"Tired of Hanging Around"	3:34
2.	"It's the Little Things We Do"	3:07
3.	"Valerie"	3:56
4.	"Someone Watching Over Me"	3:34
5.	"Secrets"	3:16
6.	"How Does It Feel?"	3:49
7.	"Why Won't You Give Me Your Love?"	3:22
8.	"Oh Stacey (Look What You've Done!)"	3:29
9.	"You've Got a Friend in Me"	3:57
10.	"Hello Conscience"	3:25
11.	"I Know I'll Never Leave"	4:58

iTunes bonus tracks
No.	Title	Length
12.	"Are We Friends or Lovers?"	3:00
13.	"In the City"	4:07

Japanese bonus tracks
No.	Title	Length
12.	"I'll Be Your Pockets"	2:48
13.	"Are We Friends or Lovers?"	3:00

== Personnel ==
- Dave McCabe – lead vocals, acoustic and electric guitar, piano
- Boyan Chowdhury – lead guitar
- Russel Pritchard – bass guitar, vocals
- Sean Payne – drums, percussion, vocals
- Abi Harding – alto and tenor saxophone, vocals

== Chart positions ==
=== Album ===
Country	Peak
UK Top 40	2

=== Singles ===
Year	Single	Chart positions
Year	Single	UK
2006	"Why Won't You Give Me Your Love?"	9
2006	"Valerie"	9
2006	"Oh Stacey (Look What You've Done!)"	24
2006	"It's The Little Things We Do"	47
