= Rich Love, Poor Love =

Studio album by Syreeta and G.C. Cameron
- Released: 1977
- Studios: Westlake Audio, Los Angeles; Motown Recording Studios, Los Angeles
- Genre: Soul
- Length: 39:05
- Label: Motown
- Producer: Michael Lovesmith

Syreeta chronology
| One to One (1977) | Rich Love, Poor Love (1977) | Fast Break (1979) |

G. C. Cameron chronology
| You're What's Missing in My Life (1977) | Rich Love, Poor Love (1977) | Give Me Your Love (1983) |

Professional ratings
Review scores
| Source | Rating |
|---|---|
| Allmusic | 1.5/5 stars |

Rich Love, Poor Love is a collaboration album by singers Syreeta and G.C. Cameron, released by Motown in 1977.

== Track listing ==
- All songs written by Michael Lovesmith, except where noted.

Rich Love, Poor Love track listing
| No. | Title | Length |
|---|---|---|
| 1. | "Rich Love, Poor Love Theme/You Need a Change" | 6:14 |
| 2. | "I'll Try Love Again (Syreeta Wright, G.C. Cameron, Don Daniels, Michael Lovemsith)" | 4:17 |
| 3. | "Let's Make a Deal" | 5:09 |
| 4. | "Station Break for Love" | 3:39 |
| 5. | "Made from Love" | 5:46 |
| 6. | "Love to the Rescue" | 3:26 |
| 7. | "All Things Happen for a Reason" | 4:25 |
| 8. | "Rich Love, Poor Love" | 6:09 |

== Personnel ==
- Syreeta – vocals
- G.C. Cameron – vocals
- David T. Walker, Greg Poree, Jay Graydon – guitar
- Michael Lovesmith – keyboards, backing vocals
- Sonny Burke – keyboards
- David Shields, Henry Davis – bass guitar
- James Gadson, Ollie E. Brown – drums
- Gary Coleman, Jack Ashford, Julius Wechter – percussion
- William Green – saxophone on "You Need a Change"
- Danny Smith, Marti McCall, Myrna Matthews, Pattie Brooks, Petsye Powell – backing vocals
