= Oh Stacey (Look What You've Done!) =

Single by The Zutons

from the album Tired of Hanging Around
- B-side: "Please Calm Me Down"; "You Know You Can Be Friends"; "Tired of Hanging Around (Alternate Version)"; "Some Say It's Wise"
- Released: 18 September 2006
- Recorded: Autumn 2005
- Genre: Indie
- Length: 3:29
- Label: Deltasonic
- Songwriters: Boyan Chowdhury; Abi Harding; Dave McCabe; Sean Payne; Russell Pritchard
- Producer: Stephen Street

The Zutons singles chronology
"Valerie" (2006)	"Oh Stacey (Look What You've Done!)" (2006)	"It's the Little Things We Do" (2006)

"Oh Stacey (Look What You've Done!)" is a song by English rock band the Zutons, released in September 2006 as the third single from their second album Tired of Hanging Around. It is the band's eighth consecutive UK top 40 single, peaking at No. 24 on the UK Singles Chart.

== Music video ==
The music video shows a blonde woman (presumably called Stacey) murdering the band members one by one, and their ghosts singing the song in the morgue. Stacey (whose face is hidden by a shadow) cuts off McCabe's head with an axe, flattens Pritchard with a car, ties up and suffocates Harding with a rag soaked in something and sends Payne and Chowdhury over the edge of a building. It is revealed that the blonde woman is Harding's evil twin and the death scenes are shown again with Stacey's face revealed, she is played by Harding in a blonde wig.

== Track listings ==
CD 1

1. "Oh Stacey (Look What You've Done!)"
2. "Please Calm Me Down"

CD 2

1. "Oh Stacey (Look What You've Done!)"
2. "You Know You Can Be Friends"
3. "Tired of Hanging Around" (alternate version)
4. "Oh Stacey (Look What You've Done!)" (video)

7"

1. "Oh Stacey (Look What You've Done!)"
2. "Some Say It's Wise"
