= Episode One: Children of Harlem =

Studio album by Gary Bartz
- Released: 1994
- Recorded: January 20, 1994
- Studio: Van Gelder, Englewood Cliffs, NJ
- Genre: Jazz
- Length: 65:30
- Label: Challenge; SJP 379
- Producer: Russ Musto

Gary Bartz chronology
Shadows (1990)	Episode One: Children of Harlem (1994)	The Red and Orange Poems (1994)

Episode One: Children of Harlem is an album by saxophonist Gary Bartz, recorded in 1994 and released on the Dutch Challenge label.

== Reception ==
Professional ratings
Review scores
Source	Rating
AllMusic	2.5/5 stars
The Penguin Guide to Jazz Recordings	3/4 stars

Scott Yanow of AllMusic said, "Bartz (who is heard on alto and soprano) is in fine form playing with a top-notch quartet... The hard-bop oriented music includes a few standards and three originals by either Bartz or Willis. It's not essential but enjoyable".

== Track listing ==
1. "Amos 'n' Andy Theme One & Spoken Intro" (William Campbell) – 3:08
2. "Tap Dancer" (Gary Bartz) – 7:01
3. "If This Isn't Love" (Burton Lane, Yip Harburg) – 10:39
4. "Tico Tico" (Zequinha de Abreu) – 8:45
5. "Ezekiel Saw the Wheel" (Traditional) – 8:53
6. "Children of Harlem" (Larry Willis) – 7:35
7. "Crazy She Calls Me" (Carl Sigman, Bob Russell) – 12:55
8. "Heavy Blue" (Larry Willis) – 5:12
9. "Ruby Begonia & Amos 'n' Andy Theme Two" (Gaetano Braga) – 1:29

== Personnel ==
- Gary Bartz – alto saxophone
- Larry Willis – piano
- Buster Williams – bass
- Ben Riley – drums
