= There Goes the Neighborhood! =

Live album by Gary Bartz
- Released: 1991
- Recorded: November 1990
- Venue: Birdland
- Genre: Jazz
- Label: Candid
- Producer: Mark Morganelli

Gary Bartz chronology
West 42nd Street (1990)	There Goes the Neighborhood! (1991)	Shadows (1992)

There Goes the Neighborhood! is a live album by the American musician Gary Bartz, released in 1991. The album is considered to be part of Bartz's comeback, after his absence from recording for most of the 1980s.

== Production ==
The album was recorded in November 1990, at Birdland, in New York City. Bartz was backed by the Candid All Stars: bassist Ray Drummond, pianist Kenny Barron, and drummer Ben Riley. He composed "Racism (Blues in Double Bb Minor)" and "Flight Path". "Impressions" is a version of the John Coltrane composition. Two songs were written by Tadd Dameron: "On a Misty Night" and "Tadd's Delight".

== Critical reception ==
Professional ratings
Review scores
Source	Rating
AllMusic	4/5 stars
The News & Observer	3/4 stars
The Penguin Guide to Jazz on CD	4/4 stars

The Chicago Tribune called the set "energetic and immediate, very much the sinew of jazz." The Washington Post wrote that "Bartz's brash, headlong improvisations, accruing more momentum with every chorus and often sustained brilliantly by Barron, are tempered by the emotional vulnerability the saxophonist displays so readily on the ballads." The News & Observer advised: "Don't expect tenderness ... unless it's the tenderness following a burn," and noted Bartz's similarity to Coltrane's "whiplashing 'sheets of sound' days." Musician labeled Bartz "a burning improviser who can bring a club to a frenzy." In 1993, Newsday wrote that Riley and Barron "played to great effect on the underrated" There Goes the Neighborhood!

AllMusic praised Bartz's "rippling solos and dominant presence." The Encyclopedia of Popular Music called the album "a vivid record of one of modern jazz’s most intense and exciting living saxophonists, playing at his peak." The Penguin Guide to Jazz on CD considered it "his finest hour."

== Track listing ==
No.	Title	Length
1.	"Racism (Blues in Double Bb Minor)"
2.	"On a Misty Night"
3.	"Laura"
4.	"Tadd's Delight"
5.	"Impressions"
6.	"I've Never Been in Love Before"
7.	"Flight Path"
