= Home! =

Live album by Gary Bartz NTU Troop
- Released: 1970
- Recorded: March 30, 1969; Left Bank Jazz Society, Baltimore, Maryland
- Genre: Jazz
- Label: Milestone; MSP 9027
- Producer: Orrin Keepnews

Gary Bartz chronology
Another Earth (1969)	Home! (1970)	Harlem Bush Music (1971)

Professional ratings
Review scores
Source	Rating
AllMusic	3/5 stars
The Rolling Stone Jazz Record Guide	4/5 stars

Home! is a live album by saxophonist Gary Bartz's NTU Troop, recorded in 1969 and released on the Milestone label.

== Track listing ==
All compositions by Gary Bartz except as indicated

1. "B.A.M." - 11:17
2. "Love" - 11:28
3. "Rise" - 8:45
4. "Amal" - 7:18
5. "It Don't Mean a Thing" (Duke Ellington, Irving Mills) - 5:12

== Personnel ==
- Gary Bartz - alto saxophone, bells, steel drums
- Woody Shaw - trumpet
- Albert Dailey - piano
- Bob Cunningham - bass
- Rashied Ali - drums
