= Marietta Waters =

American singer

- Also known as: Marietta, Marietta Araiza
- Born: United States
- Genres: Pop; Latin
- Occupations: Singer; vocal coach
- Years active: 1976–present

Marietta Waters is an American singer and most known for her performance of "Destination Unknown" on the Top Gun soundtrack, where she is credited by the stage name Marietta.

== Career ==
During her early career in the 1970s, Waters was credited under the name Marietta Araiza for her work with Sérgio Mendes and Syreeta, providing vocals on the albums Homecooking and One to One, respectively. Marietta has also recorded several albums with Berlin, Harold Faltermeyer, and Animotion, and recorded backup vocals for several artists such as Ringo Starr, Crystal Lewis, Donna Summer, Freddie Ravel, Elton John, Olivia Newton-John, Marc Antoine, and Lee Ritenour.

Marietta performed the song "Destination Unknown" for the soundtrack to the 1986 film Top Gun. Her other soundtrack credits include "By Design" in the film Perfect, the title track of the film Fire and Ice, and "Thunder and Lightning" from its sequel, Fire, Ice and Dynamite. "Fire and Ice" was released as a single in 1986, reaching No. 5 in Switzerland and No. 10 in Germany.

She has worked with producers such as Giorgio Moroder, Harold Faltermeyer, and Michael Jay. Some of Marietta's songs have been recorded by Sérgio Mendes, Donna Summer, Dionne Warwick, and Seals and Crofts.

Now living in southern California, Waters continues to write, record, and perform. She recorded for Paul Williams and performed for a tribute to Hal David. She has also expanded her talents as a singing coach.

Marietta's CD single in 1994, "A Call from the Heart", was inspired by her pop, soul, Latin, jazz, R&B, and gospel influences.
