= Velvet Vault =

Studio album by Karen Souza
- Released: 1 December 2017
- Studios: EON Studios (Bogota); NK Sound (Tokyo); Rafael Barata Studios (Rio de Janeiro)
- Genre: Jazz
- Length: 40:40
- Label: Music Brokers
- Producers: Richard Gottehrer, Guillermo Porro, Jose Reinoso, Karen Souza, Alonzo Vargas

Karen Souza chronology
Essentials II (2014)	Velvet Vault (2017)

Velvet Vault is a studio album by Argentinian jazz singer Karen Souza. The album was recorded in Colombia, Japan, and Brazil and released on 1 December 2017 via Music Brokers label.

== Reception ==
Andy Hermann of DownBeat wrote "Souza brings a timeless quality to the material, whether it’s a standard like “I Fall In Love Too Easily”—rendered on Velvet Vault as a hat-tip to Chet Baker's iconic version, complete with muted trumpet—or a recent indie-rock hit like MGMT’s “Kids,” which Souza, who also produced Velvet Vault, stripped of its original electronic instrumentation and cast as a ghostly piano ballad".

Ilana Kalish of Atwood Magazine noted "Since 2011, the vintage vixen has released 5 albums of covers as a soloist and more with The Cooltrane Quartet. But, Ms. Karen is no one trick vixen. Nestled in with the cornucopia of covers galore on her latest album Velvet Vault (’17) are some very well interpreted jazz standards. Which proves to an even broader, perhaps older generation of the music world that Ms. Souza’s chops are legitimate, and her kudos well earned".

A reviewer of Broadway World stated "Featuring several jazz standards, "Velvet Vault" is a more mature and more subtle than Karen's previous efforts, and she truly feels is her best album to date".

== Track listing ==
No.	Title	Writer(s)	Length
1.	"I Fall in Love Too Easily"	Sammy Cahn, Jule Styne	3:46
2.	"Don't Let the Sun Go Down on Me"	Elton John, Bernie Taupin	3:59
3.	"I'm Beginning to See the Light"	Edward Ellington, Don George, Johnny Hodges, Harry James	2:36
4.	"Valerie"	Boyan Chowdhury, Abigail Harding, David McCabe, Sean Payne, Russell Pritchard	4:13
5.	"I'm Not in Love"	Graham Gouldman, Eric Stewart	4:08
6.	"You Got That Something"	David Nathan, Pamela Oland, Karen Souza	4:05
7.	"In Between Days"	Robert Smith	3:22
8.	"In the Blink of an Eye"	Pamela Oland, Leandro Peirano, Karen Souza	3:44
9.	"Walk on the Wild Side"	Lou Reed	3:16
10.	"Angel Eyes"	Earl Brent, Matt Dennis	4:19
11.	"Kids"	Ben Goldwasser, Andrew VanWyngarden	3:12
Total length:			40:40
