= The Red and Orange Poems =

Studio album by Gary Bartz
- Released: 1994
- Recorded: September 24–25, 1994
- Studio: Power Station
- Genre: Jazz
- Label: Atlantic Jazz
- Producer: Gary Bartz, Eulis Cathey

Gary Bartz chronology
Episode One: Children of Harlem (1994)	The Red and Orange Poems (1994)	Alto Memories (1995)

The Red and Orange Poems is an album by the American saxophonist Gary Bartz, released in 1994. It was considered a comeback album. Bartz supported the album with a North American tour. The album peaked at No. 25 on Billboard's Traditional Jazz Albums chart.

== Production ==
The arrangements were by Bartz, who had originally asked Benny Golson to do them. Mulgrew Miller played piano on the album. Eddie Henderson and John Clark contributed on horns. The liner notes were written by Stanley Crouch.

== Critical reception ==
Professional ratings
Review scores
Source	Rating
AllMusic	3/5 stars
The Encyclopedia of Popular Music	3/5 stars
Entertainment Weekly	B+
Los Angeles Daily News	4/4 stars
MusicHound Jazz: The Essential Album Guide	2.5/5 stars
The Penguin Guide to Jazz Recordings	3/4 stars

Entertainment Weekly wrote that "the limber and witty alto sax legend Gary Bartz serves up solos that sing and speak." The Atlantic determined that the album finds Bartz's "rich and bluesy alto gaining luster against a two-piece brass section, while the program of standards, original ballads, and a touch of soca is quietly probing."

The Washington Post opined that "Bartz not only brings a fat, creamy tone and an ingenious harmonic grasp to the saxophone but also a maturity that enables him to say something with his technique." The Los Angeles Daily News concluded that "Bartz takes time to breathe, and yet he plays shatteringly well when he wants to be more raucous." Stereo Review deemed The Red and Orange Poems "an album of characteristic diversity that may well be his best to date."

AllMusic stated that "Bartz is in excellent form."

== Track listing ==
No.	Title	Length
1.	"By Myself"
2.	"Nusia's Poem"
3.	"I'm Gonna Laugh You Right Out of My Life"
4.	"J Seas"
5.	"Relentless"
6.	"Along the Twelve Tone Row"
7.	"Soulmate"
8.	"But Not for Me"
