= Gary Bartz =

American jazz saxophonist & singer (born 1940)

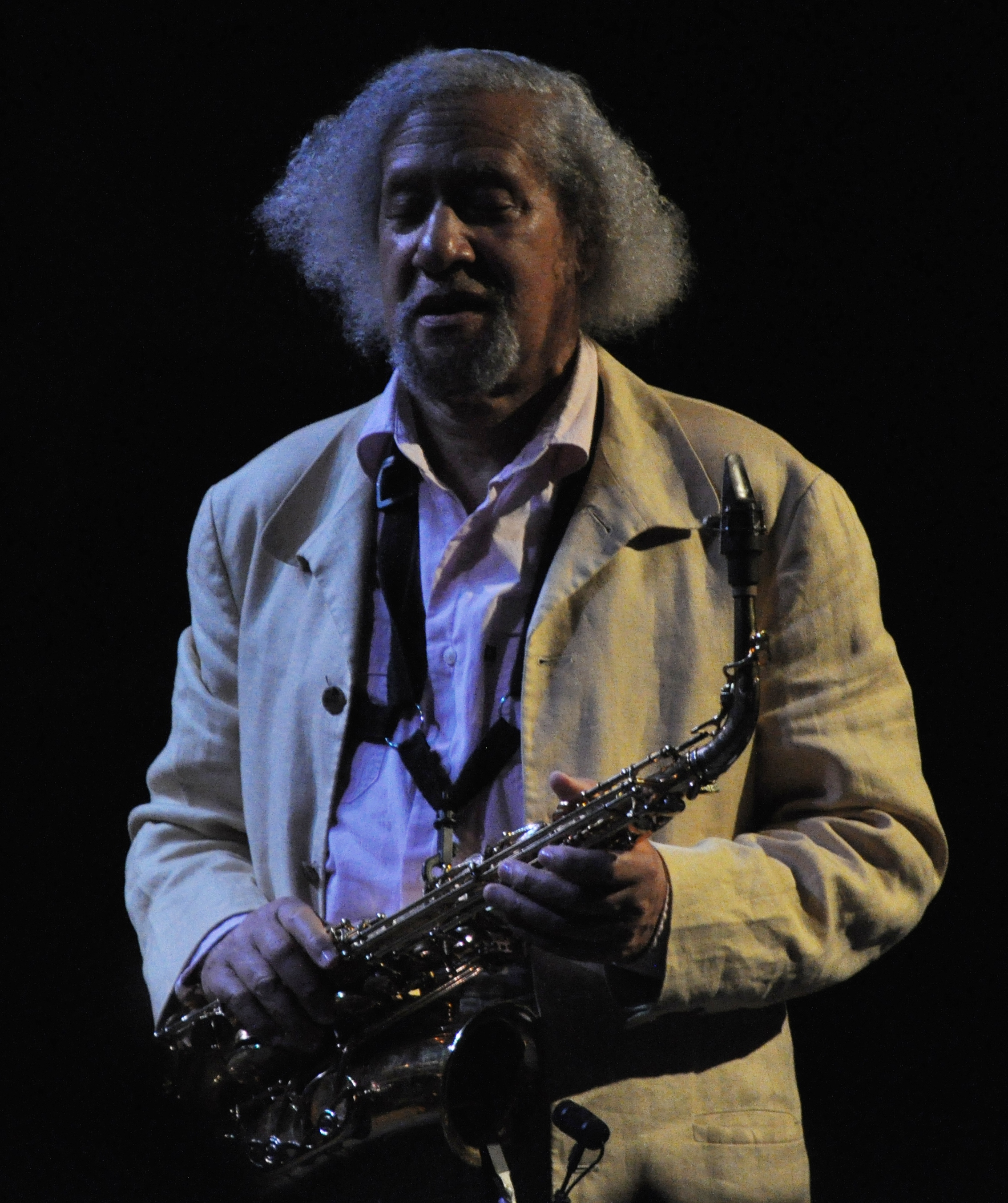
- Gary Bartz at the 2007 North Sea Jazz Festival in Rotterdam

Background information
- Born: September 26, 1940 (age 86); Baltimore, Maryland, U.S.
- Genres: Jazz, jazz fusion, bebop, hard bop, free jazz, spiritual jazz, soul jazz, jazz-funk, acid jazz
- Occupations: Musician, composer, bandleader, educator
- Instruments: Alto saxophone, soprano saxophone, flute, keyboards, vocals, percussion
- Years active: 1960s–present
- Labels: Milestone, Prestige, P-Vine, SteepleChase, Candid, Atlantic, Blue Note, Mapleshade

Gary Bartz (born September 26, 1940) is an American jazz saxophonist. He has won two Grammy Awards.

== Biography ==
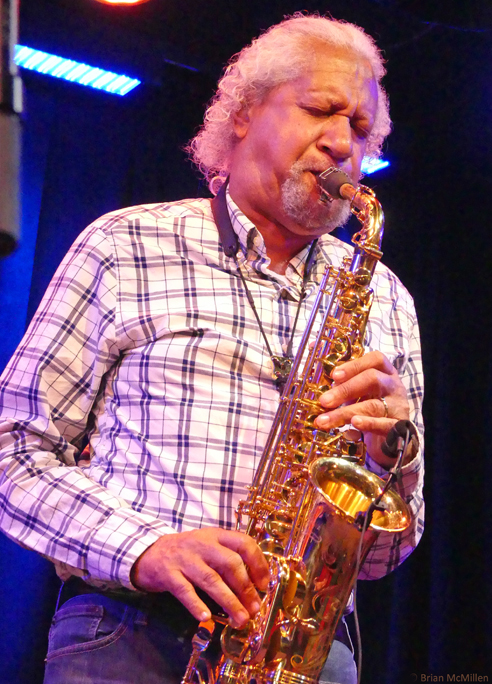
Bartz at the Kuumbwa Jazz Center, Santa Cruz, California, July 2017

Bartz was first exposed to jazz as the son of the owners of a jazz nightclub in Baltimore. In 1958 he left Baltimore to study at the Juilliard School. In the early 1960s, he performed with Eric Dolphy and McCoy Tyner in Charles Mingus' Jazz Workshop. He worked as a sideman with Max Roach and Abbey Lincoln before joining Art Blakey and the Jazz Messengers. In 1968, he was a member of McCoy Tyner's band, Expansions.

In mid-1970, he joined Miles Davis' band, performing live at the Isle Of Wight festival in August; and at a series of December dates at The Cellar Door club in Washington, D.C. Portions of these shows were initially released on the 1971 Live-Evil album, with the entire six performance/four night run eventually released in full on the 2005 Cellar Door Sessions box set. He later formed the band Ntu Troop, which combined jazz, funk, and soul.

Bartz was awarded a Grammy for "Best Latin Jazz Performance" for his work on Roy Hargrove's "Habana" at the 40th Annual Grammy Awards, and for "Best Jazz Instrumental Album, Individual or Group" for For McCoy Tyner's Illuminations at the 47th Annual Grammy Awards.

Bartz was awarded the BNY Mellon Jazz 2015 Living Legacy Award, which was presented at a special ceremony at The Kennedy Center.

In 2019, Revive Music and Bartz celebrated the 50th Anniversary of his Another Earth album at Winter Jazzfest in New York City, alongside original member Pharoah Sanders.

He is Professor of Jazz Saxophone at Oberlin College.

== Discography ==
=== As leader/co-leader ===
Recording date	Album title	Label	Year released	Notes / Personnel
1967–05, 1967–06	Libra	Milestone	1968	Quintet: with Jimmy Owens, Albert Daily, Richard Davis, Billy Higgins
1968–06	Another Earth	Milestone	1969	With Charles Tolliver, Pharoah Sanders, Stanley Cowell, Reggie Workman, Freddie Waits
1969	Home!	Milestone	1970	Live. NTU Troop: with Woody Shaw, Albert Dailey, Bob Cunningham, Rashied Ali.
1970–11	Harlem Bush Music – Taifa	Milestone	1971	NTU Troop: with Nat Bettis, Andy Bey, Harold White. Compilation in 1997.
1971–01-	Harlem Bush Music – Uhuru	Milestone	1971	NTU Troop: with Nat Bettis, Andy Bey, Ron Carter, Juini Booth. Compilation in 1997.
1972–10	Juju Street Songs	Prestige	1972	NTU Troop: with Stafford James, Harvey Mason
1972–10, 1973–06	Follow the Medicine Man	Prestige	1973	NTU Troop: with Hector Centeno, Hubert Eaves III, Andy Bey
1973–07	I've Known Rivers and Other Bodies	Prestige	1973	NTU Troop: with Stafford James, Howard King
1973–07	Altissimo	Philips	1973	With Charlie Mariano, Jackie McLean, Lee Konitz, Joachim Kühn, Han Bennink, Palle Danielsson
1973–11, 1974–02	Singerella: A Ghetto Fairy Tale	Prestige	1974	NTU Troop: with Hector Centeno, Howard King, Hubert Eaves III, James Benjamin, Kenneth Nash, Maynard Parker
1975?	The Shadow Do!	Prestige	1975	With Hubert Eaves III, Michael Henderson, Reggie Lucas, James Mtume, Howard King
1976?	Juju Man	Catalyst	1976	With Curtis Robertson, Howard King, Charles Mims, Syreeta
1977	Love Song	Vee-Jay	1977	With George Cables, Curtis Robinson, Howard King, Rita Greene
1977	Music Is My Sanctuary	Capitol	1977	With Syreeta Wright, Mizell Brothers
1978?	Love Affair	Capitol	1978	With Wah Wah Watson, Dorothy Ashby, Welton Gite, Bill Summers, George Cables, Wade Marcus
1980?	Bartz	Arista	1980	With Howard King, Hubert Eaves III
1988–04	Monsoon	SteepleChase	1988	Quartet: with Butch Lacy, Billy Hart, Clint Houston
1988–11	Reflections of Monk: The Final Frontier	SteepleChase	1989	With Bob Butta, Geoff Harper, Billy Hart, Eddie Henderson
1990–03	West 42nd Street	Candid	1990	Live. Quintet: with Claudio Roditi, John Hicks, Ray Drummond, Al Foster.
1990–11	There Goes the Neighborhood!	Candid	1991	Live. With Kenny Barron, Ray Drummond, Ben Riley.
1991–06	Shadows	Timeless	1992	With Benny Green, Christian McBride, Victor Lewis, Willie Williams
1993–06	Alto Memories	Verve	1994	Co-led with Sonny Fortune. Also with Kenny Barron, Buster Williams, Jack DeJohnette.
1994–01	Episode One: Children of Harlem	Challenge	1994	With Larry Willis, Ben Riley, Buster Williams
1994–09	The Red and Orange Poems	Atlantic	1994	Dave Holland, Mulgrew Miller, Eddie Henderson
1996?	The Blues Chronicles: Tales of Life	Atlantic	1996	With Tom Williams, George Colligan, James King, Greg Bandy, Jon Hendricks, Cyrus Chestnut, Russell Malone, Dennis Chambers
1998–05	Live @ the Jazz Standard, Vol. 1: Soulstice	OYO Recordings	1999	Live. With Barney McAll, Greg Bandy, Kenny Davis.
1999–10	The Montreal Concert	DSM	2001	Live. Co-led with Peter Leitch.
2003–10	Continuum Act One	Space Time	2004	With Jean Toussaint, Bill Mobley, Donald Brown, Essiet Essiet, Billy Kilson, Anga Diaz. Includes one live track.
2005?	Soprano Stories	OYO Recordings	2005	With James King, Greg Bandy, George Cables, John Hicks
2000–05, 2000–11, 2008–06, 2008–07	Coltrane Rules: Tao of a Music Warrior	OYO Recordings	2011	With Barney McAll, Greg Bandy, James King
2019	Night Dreamer Direct-to-Disc Sessions	Night Dreamer	2020	With Maisha
3-7 June 2023	Where Rivers Meet	Brownswood Recordings	2026	With Your Brother's Keeper

=== As sideman ===
With Art Blakey and the Jazz Messengers

- Soul Finger (Limelight, 1965) – Bartz recording debut
- Hold On, I'm Coming (Limelight, 1966) – on one track left over from Soul Finger sessions

With Donald Byrd

- Stepping into Tomorrow (Blue Note, 1975) – rec. 1974
- Caricatures (Blue Note, 1976)

With George Cables

- Shared Secrets (MuseFX, 2001)
- Looking for the Light (MuseFX, 2003)

With Norman Connors

- Slewfoot (Buddah, 1974)
- Love from the Sun (Buddah, 1974)
- Saturday Night Special (Buddah, 1975)
- Dance of Magic: Live at the Nemu Jazz Inn (Cobblestone, 1975)
- Romantic Journey (Buddah, 1977)
- This is Your Life (Arista, 1977)
- Invitation (Arista, 1979)

With Miles Davis

- Live-Evil (Columbia, 1971) – rec. 1970
- The Cellar Door Sessions (Columbia, 2005)[6CD] – rec. 1970
- Bitches Brew Live (Columbia, 2011) – live rec. 1970
- Miles Davis at Newport 1955–1975: The Bootleg Series Vol. 4 (Columbia, 2015) – live rec. 1971

With Roy Hargrove

- Of Kindred Souls: The Roy Hargrove Quintet Live (Novus, 1993)
- Roy Hargrove's Crisol, Habana (Verve, 1997) – Latin Jazz Grammy Winner

With Heads of State

- Search for Peace (Smoke Sessions, 2015)
- Four in One (Smoke Sessions, 2017)

With Phyllis Hyman

- Phyllis Hyman (Buddah, 1977)
- You Know How to Love Me (Arista, 1979)
- Can't We Fall in Love Again? (Arista, 1981)

With Barney McAll

- Release the Day (Transparent Music, 2000)
- Precious Energy (Extra Celestial Arts, 2022)
- Precious Energy Re-UP (Extra Celestial Arts, 2023)

With Woody Shaw

- Blackstone Legacy (Contemporary, 1970)
- For Sure! (Columbia, 1979)
- United (Columbia, 1981)

With Malachi Thompson

- Rising Daystar (Delmark, 1999)
- Blue Jazz (Delmark, 2003)

With McCoy Tyner

- Expansions (Blue Note, 1970) – rec. 1978
- Extensions (Blue Note, 1973) – rec. 1970
- Asante (Blue Note, 1974) – rec. 1970
- Sama Layuca (Milestone, 1974)
- Cosmos (Blue Note, 1976) – rec. 1968–1970
- Focal Point (Milestone, 1976)
- Looking Out (Milestone, 1982)
- Dimensions (Elektra/Musician, 1984) – rec. 1983
- McCoy Tyner and the Latin All-Stars (Telarc, 1999) – rec. 1998
- Illuminations (Telarc, 2004) – rec. 2003

With others

- The Rance Allen Group, Say My Friend (1977)
- Gene Ammons, Goodbye (Prestige, 1974)
- Roy Ayers, Stoned Soul Picnic (Atlantic, 1968)
- Cindy Blackman, The Oracle (Muse, 1995)
- Donald Brown, Sources of Inspiration (Muse, 1989)
- Kenny Burrell, Ellington Is Forever Volume Two (Fantasy, 1977)
- Joe Chambers, Urban Grooves (Eighty-eight's, 2002)
- Ray Drummond, Vignettes (Arabesque, 1996)
- Antonio Hart, Don't You Know That I Care (1992)
- Louis Hayes, The Crawl (Candid, 1989)
- John Lee & Gerry Brown, Infinite Jones (Keytone, 1974)
- Jackie McLean, Ode to Super (SteepleChase, 1973)
- Grachan Moncur III, Exploration (Capri, 2004)
- Alphonse Mouzon, Virtue (MPS, 1977)
- Rare Silk, New Weave (Polydor, 1984)
- Max Roach, Members, Don't Git Weary (Atlantic, 1968)
- Wallace Roney, A Place in Time (HighNote, 2016)
- Pharoah Sanders, Deaf Dumb Blind (Summun Bukmun Umyun) (Impulse!, 1970)
- Sphere, Sphere (Verve, 1998)
- Bob Thiele Collective, Lion Hearted (Red Baron, 1993)
- Leon Thomas, Precious Energy (Mapleshade, 1990)
- Charles Tolliver, Charles Tolliver and his All Stars (Black Lion, 1971)
- Robert Walter, Spirit of '70 (Greyboy, 1996)
- Chip White, Harlem Sunset (Postcards, 1994)
- Adrian Younge and Ali Shaheed Muhammed, The Midnight Hour (Linear Labs, 2018)
