= Ken McMullen (rugby) =

Australian rugby union international

- Full name: Kenneth Victor McMullen
- Born: 16 April 1941 Wagga Wagga, NSW, Australia
- Died: 6 February 1986 (aged 44) Sydney, NSW, Australia
- Notable relative: Craig McMullen (son)

Rugby union career
- Position: Scrum-half
International career
Years	Team	Apps	(Points)
1962–63	Australia	4	(3)
- Rugby league career

Playing information
- Position: Halfback
Club
Years	Team	Pld	T	G	FG	P
1964–67	Eastern Suburbs	22				13

Kenneth Victor McMullen (16 April 1941 — 6 February 1986) was an Australian rugby union international who represented Australia in four Test matches. He also played rugby league for Eastern Suburbs.

A native of Wagga Wagga, McMullen was educated at Wagga Wagga High School and played both codes growing up.

McMullen, a rugby union scrum-half, toured New Zealand with New South Wales Country in 1960. It was his performance against the touring All Blacks two years later, in New South Wales' one-point win at the Sydney Sports Ground, that earned him Wallabies selection as a reserve for the 2nd Test. After being picked for that year's reciprocal tour of New Zealand, McMullen displaced Ken Catchpole to debut at scrum-half in the 1st Test in Wellington.

From 1964 to 1967, McMullen played first-grade rugby league for Eastern Suburbs, mainly as a halfback.

McMullen died of a brain tumour in 1986 at the age of 44.

== See also ==
- List of Australia national rugby union players
