= Valerie (Zutons song) =

2006 single by the Zutons

Single by the Zutons

from the album Tired of Hanging Around
- Released: 19 June 2006
- Recorded: Autumn 2005
- Genre: Indie pop; blues rock
- Length: 3:56
- Label: Deltasonic
- Songwriters: Abi Harding; Boyan Chowdhury; Dave McCabe; Russ Pritchard; Sean Payne
- Producer: Stephen Street

The Zutons singles chronology
"Why Won't You Give Me Your Love?" (2006)	"Valerie" (2006)	"Oh Stacey (Look What You've Done!)" (2006)

Music video
- "Valerie" on YouTube

"Valerie" is a song by English indie rock band the Zutons from their second studio album, Tired of Hanging Around (2006).

The song was later covered by musician, DJ and producer Mark Ronson, with vocals provided by singer-songwriter Amy Winehouse. This version reached number two on the UK Singles Chart in 2007.

== Background ==
In an interview with The Scotsman in May 2008, lead singer Dave McCabe described the writing process of the song: "I could tell you I was inspired by gazing out across the Mersey or walking past Macca's old house, but the truth is I got the idea in a cab on the way to my mum's. The whole song was written before I got there, so 20 minutes, max[imum]".

The song's title and theme refer to a then-unnamed American friend of McCabe's who was in trouble for driving under the influence. The band's drummer, Sean Payne, called it a "musical postcard to her, saying he is having a hard time and can she come over and see him". In an interview with Vice magazine in June 2019, the subject of the song was revealed to be celebrity makeup artist Valerie Star. She explained that she met McCabe and how she got arrested for driving on a suspended licence.

== Other uses ==
The song was used by ITV during the 2006 FIFA World Cup, alongside Primal Scream's "Country Girl" and Kasabian's cover of David Bowie's 1977 single "'Heroes'". The song was also featured as a playable track in Lego Rock Band.

Both the original and the Mark Ronson version featured in British soap opera Emmerdale during the wedding of Eric and Val Pollard in 2008.

== Music video ==
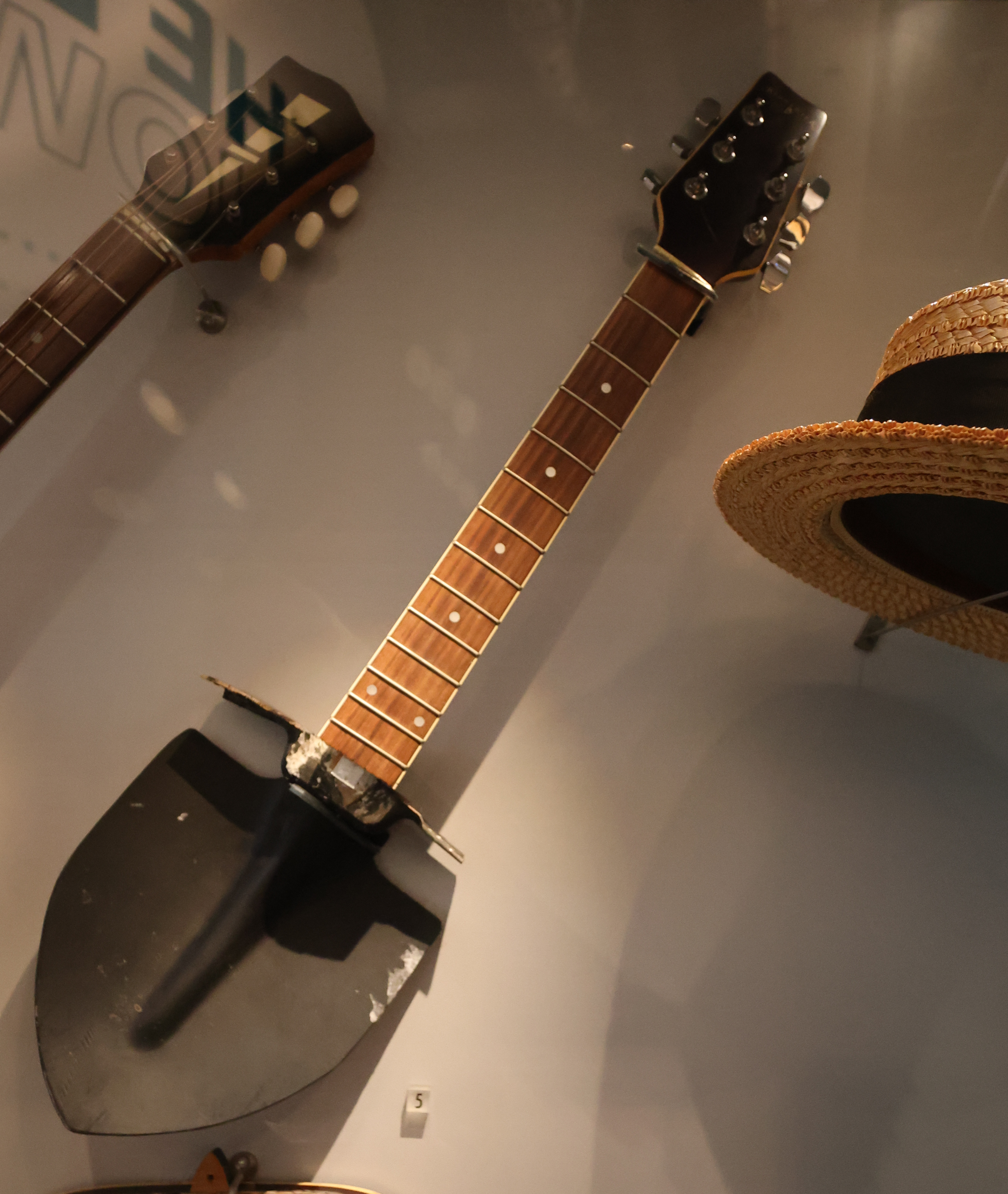
A prop used in the music video

The music video was directed by Scott Lyon. It is set in a prison and shows the Zutons trying to escape.

== Track listings ==
- CD 1
1. "Valerie"
2. "April Fool"
- CD 2
1. "Valerie"
2. "I Will Be Your Pockets"
3. "In the City"
4. "Valerie" (music video)
- 7-inch single
1. "Valerie"
2. "Get Up and Dance"

== Charts ==
=== Weekly charts ===
Chart (2006)	Peak position
Europe (European Hot 100 Singles)	33
Ireland (IRMA)	32
Scottish Singles Sales (Official Charts)	8
UK Singles (Official Charts)	9

=== Year-end charts ===
Chart (2006)	Position
UK Singles (OCC)	68

== Certifications ==
Region	Certification	Certified units/sales
United Kingdom (BPI)	Platinum	600,000^{‡}
^{‡} Sales+streaming figures based on certification alone.

== Mark Ronson and Amy Winehouse version ==
"Valerie"

Single by Mark Ronson featuring Amy Winehouse

from the album Version
- B-side: "California" (live); "Back to Black"
- Released: 15 October 2007
- Recorded: 2007
- Studio: Daptone (New York City); Metropolis (London); Sarm West (London); Allido (New York City)
- Genre: Pop; soul; jazz; Northern soul
- Length: 3:37
- Label: Columbia; Island
- Songwriters: Dave McCabe; Russell Pritchard; Sean Payne; Abi Harding; Paul Molloy; Boyan Chowdhury
- Producer: Mark Ronson

Mark Ronson singles chronology
"Oh My God" (2007)	"Valerie" (2007)	"Just" (2008)

Amy Winehouse singles chronology
"Tears Dry on Their Own" (2007)	"Valerie" (2007)	"Love Is a Losing Game" (2007)

Music video
- "Valerie" on YouTube

English musicians Mark Ronson and Amy Winehouse covered "Valerie" for Ronson's second studio album Version (2007). Released as the album's third single on 15 October 2007, the track was first performed by Winehouse on Jo Whiley's Live Lounge show on BBC Radio 1. American singer and director Jordan Galland plays the electric piano on this single. Rolling Stone called the cover Winehouse's only "notable recording" after Back to Black. Winehouse had previously recorded a slower-tempo version of the song, which appeared as a bonus track on the deluxe edition of Back to Black. The song has been featured in 27 Dresses and Amy (2015), a documentary film biography of Winehouse, a U.S. advertisement for Amazon Echo, and the demonstration launch video for the Google Nest Audio.

=== Background ===
After "Valerie" became a success in the summer of 2006, it found an unlikely fan in Amy Winehouse, who was invited to contribute to a new project with Mark Ronson. He claimed Winehouse did not listen to anything written after 1967 and that she was struggling to come up with something that would fit the sessions for Ronson's upcoming album Version. After Ronson explained that the album would consist of soul covers of guitar records, Winehouse told him that she might try "Valerie", but Ronson found it very difficult to hear her voice singing that song in his head. "I wasn't sure how it would work, but she went into the studio and tried it. I loved it", he said.

Ronson's production of the cover is based around the beat from the Jam's 1982 single "Town Called Malice". Winehouse also recorded a jazzier, acoustic version for Radio 1's Live Lounge, which was issued at the same time as the Ronson collaboration and a success in its own right, possibly due to download confusion, though it was the Ronson version that got airplay.

=== Chart performance ===
The single peaked at number two on the UK Singles Chart, where it spent 19 consecutive weeks inside the top 20. With sales of 329,490, it became the UK's ninth biggest-selling single of 2007. The single spent 36 consecutive weeks on the UK Singles Chart between September 2007 and May 2008. It re-entered the chart in late June 2008 to take its total to 39 weeks.

The song was released in early 2008 in the Netherlands, quickly gaining airplay and sales. It is Winehouse's most successful song in that country, peaking at number one for four consecutive weeks.

As of January 2015, Ronson and Winehouse's version of "Valerie" had sold 658,353 copies in the United Kingdom, according to the Official Charts Company.

After the Ronson / Winehouse release, the song briefly became something of a mixed blessing for Zutons frontman Dave McCabe, who was then being approached by female singers wanting him to write them a hit song; he noted, in May 2008, that the song, "even though it's everybody's now – started out as a Zutons song. I'm not sure about this gun-for-hire malarkey; I don't know if I could write to order."

=== Music video ===
The single's music video, directed by Robert Hales, was filmed in London on 28 August 2007. It shows Ronson and a group of jazz musicians playing the intro song with American rapper Wale (who also appears as a vocalist on Ronson's cover of Method Man and Mary J. Blige's "You're All I Need to Get By" alongside Tawiah, a track on the digital deluxe edition of Version and the BBC Radio 1 40th anniversary compilation album Radio 1: Established 1967) freestyling over it, before moving on to the next number before briefly halting it when they notice that Winehouse is not present, then inviting a woman from the audience – an Amy fan sporting her famous beehive hairstyle – onto their stage to "sing" the song, soon joined by other similarly coiffed women, in the style of group karaoke, all lip synching to Winehouse's voice. Among the five women were Dominique Tipper, Una Palliser, Kotono Sato, and Charlotte Woodhead, who was also the casting director for the video, all lip-synching.

=== Track listings ===
- CD single
1. "Valerie" – 3:39
2. "Valerie" (Baby J remix) – 3:36
3. "Valerie" (The Count & Sinden remix) – 5:30
4. "California" (live from Wireless Festival) – 3:43

=== Charts ===
==== Weekly charts ====
Chart (2007–2008)	Peak position
Austria (Ö3 Austria Top 40)	5
Belgium (Ultratop 50 Flanders)	18
Croatia (HRT)	2
Europe (European Hot 100 Singles)	11
Germany (GfK)	3
Germany Airplay (BVMI)	3
Hungary (Dance Top 40)	38
Ireland (IRMA)	3
Netherlands (Dutch Top 40)	1
Netherlands (Single Top 100)	1
New Zealand (Recorded Music NZ)	39
Russia Airplay (Tophit)	249
Scottish Singles Sales (Official Charts)	2
Slovakia Airplay (ČNS IFPI)	27
Switzerland (Schweizer Hitparade)	3
UK Singles (Official Charts)	2
UK Hip Hop/R&B (Official Charts)	1

Chart (2011)	Peak position
Germany (GfK)	52
Ireland (IRMA)	40
Italy (FIMI)	100
Netherlands (Single Top 100)	58
Scottish Singles Sales (Official Charts)	47
UK Singles (Official Charts)	45
UK Hip Hop/R&B (Official Charts)	20
US R&B/Hip-Hop Digital Song Sales (Billboard)	28

Chart (2019)	Peak position
US R&B Digital Song Sales (Billboard)	29

Chart (2024)	Peak position
UK Singles Downloads (Official Charts)	61

Solo Amy Winehouse version

Chart (2008)	Peak position
Australia (ARIA)	75
Austria (Ö3 Austria Top 40)	35
Germany (GfK)	50
Ireland (IRMA)	33
Italy (FIMI)	46
Netherlands (Single Top 100)	4
UK Singles (Official Charts)	37

Chart (2011)	Peak position
Australia (ARIA)	34
Austria (Ö3 Austria Top 40)	39
Germany (GfK)	48
Ireland (IRMA)	45
Netherlands (Single Top 100)	8
New Zealand (Recorded Music NZ)	29
Scottish Singles Sales (Official Charts)	54
Switzerland (Schweizer Hitparade)	44
UK Singles (Official Charts)	41
UK Hip Hop/R&B (Official Charts)	19

==== Year-end charts ====
Chart (2007)	Position
Europe (European Hot 100 Singles)	79
UK Singles (OCC)	9

Chart (2008)	Position
Austria (Ö3 Austria Top 40)	19
Europe (European Hot 100 Singles)	18
Germany (Official German Charts)	14
Netherlands (Dutch Top 40)	4
Netherlands (Single Top 100)	3
Switzerland (Schweizer Hitparade)	41
UK Singles (OCC)	61

Chart (2024)	Position
Netherlands (Single Top 100)	70
UK Singles (OCC)	93

Solo Amy Winehouse version

Chart (2008)	Position
Netherlands (Single Top 100)	27

==== Decade-end charts ====
Chart (2000–2009)	Position
UK Singles (OCC)	74

=== Certifications ===
Region	Certification	Certified units/sales
Australia (ARIA)	5× Platinum	350,000^{‡}
Brazil (Pro-Música Brasil)	Platinum	60,000^{‡}
Germany (BVMI)	Platinum	300,000^{‡}
Italy (FIMI)	Gold	50,000^{‡}
New Zealand (RMNZ)	7× Platinum	210,000^{‡}
Spain (Promusicae)	Platinum	60,000^{‡}
United Kingdom (BPI)	5× Platinum	3,000,000^{‡}
Solo Amy Winehouse version
Italy (FIMI)	Gold	25,000^{‡}
Spain (Promusicae)	Platinum	60,000^{‡}
United Kingdom (BPI)	Platinum	600,000^{‡}
^{‡} Sales+streaming figures based on certification alone.

== Other versions ==
When Ronson performed his version of the song during his set at the 2007 BBC Electric Proms, after Winehouse was unavailable, The View frontman Kyle Falconer stepped in on vocals. Falconer later appeared as a vocalist on Ronson's 2010 single "The Bike Song" (a track co-written by the Zutons' frontman Dave McCabe) alongside American rapper Spank Rock.

James Morrison and Panic! at the Disco both covered the song on BBC Radio 1's Live Lounge in 2008. It was sung by Niamh Perry on the fourth round of BBC's I'd Do Anything in 2008.

It was covered in a parody on Today FM's Gift Grub, prior to Munster's appearance in the 2008 Heineken Cup final, as "Flannery", after Munster hooker, Jerry Flannery. The Zutons' version of the song is referenced in the 2010 song "She Said" by Plan B.

Glee covered Ronson and Winehouse's version of the song in the episode "Special Education", as one of the two songs for the season 2 Sectionals, with Santana Lopez (Naya Rivera) singing the lead and Brittany Pierce (Heather Morris) and Mike Chang (Harry Shum Jr.) performing a choreographed dance duet. During the 100th episode of the series they redo the song as a duet with Santana and Brittany singing, backed up by the dancing of Mike and new New Directions member Jake Puckerman (Jacob Artist).

Singer Bruno Mars paid tribute to Winehouse by performing her version of the song at the 2011 MTV Video Music Awards.

Louis Tomlinson of boy band One Direction covered the song during a concert of their 2011 Up All Night Tour.

Dionne Bromfield (Winehouse's goddaughter), Aura Dione, Ivy Quainoo, Caro Emerald and Ina Müller performed the song as a tribute to Winehouse at the 2012 Echo Awards Presentation in Germany.

Syracuse indie rock band Ra Ra Riot covered the song in their 2012 and was released as a single.

EastEnders actress Rita Simons sang the song on Children in Need 2013.

The Original Pinettes Brass Band included the song (as "Baby") on their 2013 debut studio album Finally.

American bluegrass band the Brothers Comatose covered the song for their 2016 album City Painted Gold. Argentine jazz singer Karen Souza covered the song on her 2017 release Velvet Vault.

Covered by Smith & Myers on their EP Volume 1 in 2020.

Japanese R&B singer iri included a cover of the song on her first compilation album 2016–2020, released in 2021.

Filipino group Lola Amour covered the song with Leanne and Naara during their Looking Back online concert in 2022. The band often performs the song live, using a break in the song to introduce the members during their concerts.

The band The Runarounds covered the song in their 2025 Prime Video series, creating a faster, more energetic version of the song.
