= The Cellar Door =

Music club in Washington, DC

Coordinates: 38°54′18.5″N 77°4′4.1″W

The Cellar Door was a 163-seat music club located at 34th & M Street NW in the Georgetown neighborhood of Washington, D.C. from 1963 through January 7, 1982. It occupied the location of a former music club called The Shadows. The Shadows, first opened in January 1962 as a Basin Street East like cabaret and beer hang-out for the young jacket and tie professional and sweater set, and the young adult crowd drawn from among the nine colleges and universities in the District. The venue became so popular by December it outgrew the location and moved to 31st and M Streets, NW. In its place, Tom Lyons, a 23-year-old entrepreneur opened what he described as Washington's version of "the hungry i," a reference to San Francisco's famous North Beach nightclub. In its beginning the Cellar Door sponsored hootenannies for amateur talent.

One of the premier music spots in Washington, D.C., the small club served as the genesis for entertainers and as a tryout venue for larger markets. Many artists cut their professional teeth performing at The Cellar Door, while audiences delighted in being within a few feet of the stage at the tiny venue. Many music and comedy notables in 1960s and 1970s performed there.

== Notable recordings ==
Some performances at The Cellar Door were recorded and released. Albums based on live sets there include:

- In Person by Bud & Travis, 1964
- Live-Evil by Miles Davis, 1970 (later expanded into The Cellar Door Sessions 1970, released 2005)
- Live at the Cellar Door by Richie Havens, recorded 1970, released 1990
- Live at the Cellar Door by Neil Young, recorded 1970, released 2013
- FM & AM by George Carlin, 1972 (won the Grammy Award for Best Comedy Album)
- Live at The Cellar Door by The Seldom Scene, 1975, considered their signature live album
- The Redneck Jazz Explosion by Danny Gatton, 1978

== Notable artists ==
Some of the notable artists who played there include:

- John Abercrombie
- America in their first American appearance
- Joan Armatrading
- Artful Dodger
- Jackson Browne
- Brewer and Shipley
- Brecker Brothers
- Albert Brooks
- Aztec Two-Step
- Bud & Travis
- Allen Collins Band 1983
- Jimmy Buffett
- JJ Cale
- George Carlin
- Harry Chapin
- Cheech and Chong
- The Coasters
- Chick Corea
- Larry Coryell
- Bill Cosby (warm-up comic for the Mitchell Trio with John Denver)
- The Country Gentlemen
- Jim Croce
- Miles Davis
- John Denver (He sang his "Leaving, On A Jet Plane" there prior to being released by Peter, Paul and Mary. "Take Me Home, Country Roads" was sung for the general public for the first time anywhere at the club on December 30, 1970.)
- Joy of Cooking (band)
- Stevie Wonder
- The Everly Brothers
- Mort Sahl
- The Dillards
- Fat City (later to become the Starland Vocal Band)
- Doc and Merle Watson
- Gabe Kaplan
- Neil Sedaka
- John Fahey
- David Mallett
- The Flying Burrito Brothers
- The Ozark Mountain Daredevils
- The Newgrass Revival
- Paul Siebel
- Danny Gatton
- Steve Goodman
- Great Speckled Bird (Ian & Sylvia)
- Happy The Man
- Richie Havens
- John hammond jr
- Herbie Hancock (The Herbie Hancock Sextet)
- The Incredible String Band
- Billy Joel
- Rick Nelson
- Pete Kennedy
- B.B. King
- Carole King
- Leo Kottke
- Ramsey Lewis Trio
- Gordon Lightfoot
- Les McCann
- Roger McGuinn
- Charlie Mingus
- Chad Mitchell Trio
- Judy Collins
- Joni Mitchell
- Modern Jazz Quartet
- Anne Murray
- Rick Nelson
- Gram Parsons (Performed with a backing band at The Cellar Door. At the time, looking for a female vocalist for duets, his bandmates ran across Emmylou Harris at a small neighboring bar performing cover songs. Their introduction was the real start of Harris' career and a boost for Parsons' act.)
- Les Paul
- Shawn Phillips
- Jonathan Richman (& The Modern Lovers)
- Minnie Riperton
- Lee Ritenour
- The Earl Scruggs Revue
- Carly Simon
- Passport (band) Klaus Doldinger
- Tom Paxton
- Pointer Sisters
- Tom Principato
- John Prine
- Richard Pryor
- Bonnie Raitt in 1969.
- Linda Ronstadt (her band was made up of later members of The Eagles)
- Buddy Rich
- Chris Rush
- Tom Rush
- John Sebastian
- Shakti w/ John McLaughlin
- Patti Smith
- Stephanie Mills
- Tommy Smothers
- David Steinberg
- The Stone Poneys
- Taj Mahal
- James Taylor
- Livingston Taylor
- Nighthawks Jimmy Thackery
- George Thorogood
- Mary Travers
- Paul Davis (as a warmup for Mary Travers)
- Ian & Sylvia Tyson
- Trevor Veitch
- Muddy Waters
- Tom Waits
- Glenn Yarbrough
- Neil Young
- Brand X
- Warren Zevon
- Donal Leace
- Gladys Knight & the Pips
- The Persuasions
- England Dan and John Ford Coley
- Jonathan Edwards

Some music was written on site. Bill Danoff and Taffy Nivert (as Fat City) opened for John Denver in December 1970. Late one night, Denver helped finish writing a song that Danoff and Nivert had started. They debuted "Take Me Home, Country Roads" on December 30, 1970.

== Closing ==
In January 1981, The Cellar Door was sold for an undisclosed sum to Paul Kurtz and Howard Bomstein from Washington, D.C. Ultimately, the club was closed down by the Washington, D.C. fire marshal after numerous warnings. Licensed for 163 seats, it had occasionally admitted more than 200 people SRO. Also, the books for liquor sales were allegedly being done improperly: so instead of making money, a fair amount of money was being lost unbeknownst to the club owners.

== Cellar Door Productions ==
The Cellar Door Nightclub was a partnership between Jack Boyle and Sam L'Hommedieu Jr. The pair also owned two other popular Georgetown nightspots, The Crazy Horse and The Bayou, as well as The Stardust, a music club in Waldorf, Maryland. They went on to found Cellar Door Productions, which became the largest concert promoter from Baltimore to Florida, with offices in Washington D.C., Ft. Lauderdale FL, Myrtle Beach, SC, and Detroit. Bill Reid was president of Cellar Door Productions from 1983 until his firing in 1997. The Cellar Door Cos. were sold to SFX Entertainment in 1999. Cellar Door developed the Nissan Pavilion concert venue, now called the Jiffy Lube Live, west of Washington, DC. The mailing address of Jiffy Lube Live (now owned by Live Nation) is 7800 Cellar Door Drive. As well as Virginia Beach's Veterans United Home Loans Amphitheater at 3550 Cellar Door Dr, VB, VA.

Boyle continued with SFX after it was purchased by Clear Channel Entertainment and is now retired. L'Hommedieu managed the Warner Theatre (Washington, D.C.) during the 1980s.

== Later tenants ==
When the Cellar Door ceased operating, a comedy club was announced as the next tenant. However, mayor Marion Barry learned that Mafia money was involved, and decided not to grant a liquor license. A few years later, Cafe Seynabou, a restaurant featuring the cuisine of Senegal, opened at the site, but it closed within 24 months. It stayed vacant for quite some time after that. It eventually hosted the Philadelphia Cheesesteak Factory until May 2009, then Capriotti's Sandwich Shop in 2014.

In 2017, Starbucks announced plans to take over the vacant 2,600-square-foot space. Alec Berkman, BISNOW national contributor reported on July 17, 2017 that before its summer break, in June, the Georgetown-Burleith Advisory Neighborhood Commission approved design plans for a Starbucks store. The commission was initially opposed to Starbucks’ signage. However, its opposition was reversed when Starbucks corporate gave a commitment to honor the Cellar Door by exhibiting photos of the many entertainment acts that appeared at the venue over its years of operation at the historic location.

Starbucks permanently closed the historic Georgetown Cellar Door site on September 27th, 2025. The abrupt shutdown was part of a nation-wide restructuring and corporate downsizing that impacted multiple metropolitan Washington, D.C. area stores. The Georgetown store employees and managers were given two days’ notice that they would no longer work at the location. Some were offered an opportunity to transfer to another Starbucks location while others were offered severance pay and laid off immediately.
