= Fender Contempo Organ =

Combo organ

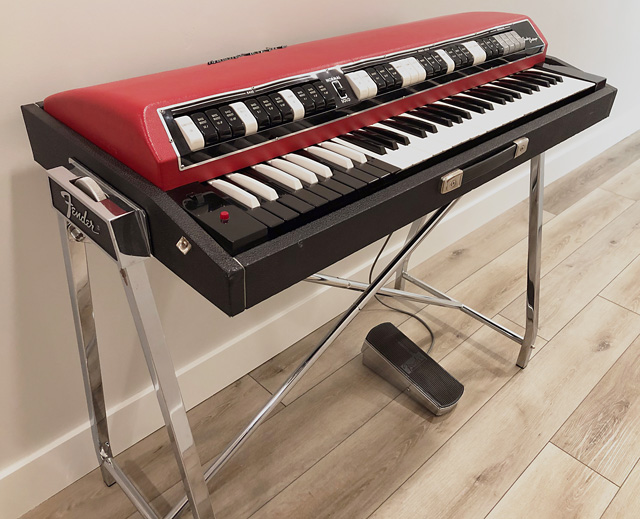
- A Fender Contempo Organ with matching stand
- Manufacturer: Fender
- Dates: 1967–1969

Technical specifications
- Polyphony: Full
- Synthesis type: Electronic
- Effects: Vibrato, tremolo

Input/output
- Keyboard: 61 keys

The Fender Contempo Organ is a combo organ made by Fender during the late 1960s. It was designed to compete with similar instruments such as the Vox Continental and Farfisa Compact, and had additional stops, features and controllers not found on the other models. However, it was only in production for a few years as it struggled to compete with the more popular Hammond organ and Rhodes piano.

== History ==
In the early to mid-1960s, there was an influx of inexpensive portable combo organs introduced by companies such as Vox, Gibson and Farfisa. Fender wanted to diversify from their established guitar and amplifier market and create a wider product range, and noticed this demand for keyboard instruments. The Fender Rhodes was already entering production, so a combo organ seemed the next logical step. The Contempo Organ was announced in 1967; the Fender Vibratone, a copy of the Leslie speaker, was introduced at the same time. The instrument's list price in 1968 was $795 ($7,200 in 2024).

By the time the instrument was introduced on the market, combo organs were on the wane and the Hammond organ and electric pianos were becoming more popular. There was a limited amount of trade interest, and consequently production ended in 1969. Bill Carson, who designed the Fender Stratocaster, was particularly scathing about the instrument, calling it "the Contemptuous" and "a pile of junk". He attributed the problems to CBS' acquisition of Fender in 1965, which reduced the quality of the company's product range.

== Features ==
The Contempo featured a keyboard built by Pratt-Read, who also helped construction with the Rhodes, and was enclosed in a similarly styled black vinyl cabinet. It was single-manual instrument with 61 keys. The bottom octave's keys were reverse-colored as on a Harpsichord which could be used as a separate bass section or act as an additional octave to the main tones. A series of rocker switches allowed selection of 16', 8', 5⅓' and 4' tones, and vibrato and tremolo options. The 5⅓' stop was designed to allow the Contempo to sound closer to a Hammond than similar combo organs. The vibrato and tremolo options are driven off the same circuitry, and consequently are in sync with each other. Each voice had an additional "boost" switch that changed its volume.

Sonically, the instrument lay somewhere between the thick weedy "buzz" of a Farfisa Combo Compact, and the breathy, piercing flutey tones of the Vox Continental. The Contempo had a unique 5-1⅓' stop tab (often not included on combo organs, though seen on a Hammond), a tremolo effect and a triple axis volume pedal, which controlled both volume on the up and down motion, and tone on the left to right motion. This pedal was adapted from the triple axis tone and volume pedals sold with Fender Pedal Steel guitars at the time.

Two different cases were available for the Contempo. The more common version had handles on both the case lid and bottom, while the other had tapered edges and both handles on the lid.

=== Controls ===
The Contempo has a number of different voices. Each one has different switches to select volume (f/ff/fff)) by activating certain resistors. This is conceptually similar to the drawbars on a Hammond organ.

- Bass Voices: Diaphone 16', Boost 16' f/ff/fff, String Bass 8', Boost 8' f/ff/fff, Horn 4', Boost 4' f/ff/fff
- Normal/Solo Switch: Switches the bass section between Bass and Solo voices
- Treble Voices: Cello 16, Diaphone 16, Boost 16 f/ff/fff, Diaphone 8, String 8, Clarinet 8', Boost 8' f/ff/fff, Quint 5-1⅓', Boost 5-1⅓' f/ff/fff, String 4', Principal 4', Boost 4' f/ff/fff,
- Effects: Solo Timbre, Vibrato Slow/Fast, Vibrato On, Solo Tremolo

== Users ==
The Contempo was commercially unsuccessful and few models were manufactured, and was not used by many professional musicians. Keith Jarrett played a Contempo in Miles Davis' group, after Fender had given Davis the instrument. It can be heard together with the Rhodes piano on the album Live-Evil and by itself on some live recordings with Davis, when Chick Corea took over the Rhodes and Jarrett only played the Contempo.
