= Live-Evil (Miles Davis album) =

Live album / studio album by Miles Davis
- Released: November 17, 1971
- Recorded: February 6 and June 3–4, 1970 (studio); December 19, 1970 (live)
- Venue: The Cellar Door (Washington, D.C.)
- Studio: Columbia Studio B (New York)
- Genre: Jazz fusion; jazz-funk
- Length: 101:56
- Label: Columbia
- Producer: Teo Macero

Miles Davis chronology
Jack Johnson (1971)	Live-Evil (1971)	On the Corner (1972)

Live-Evil is an album of both live and studio recordings by the American jazz musician Miles Davis. Parts of the album featured music from Davis' concert at the Cellar Door in 1970, which producer Teo Macero subsequently edited and pieced together in the studio. They were performed as lengthy, dense jams in the jazz-rock style, while the studio recordings consisted mostly of renditions of Hermeto Pascoal compositions. The album was originally released on November 17, 1971.

== Background ==
A number of famous jazz musicians feature on the album, including Gary Bartz, Ron Carter, Dave Holland, Keith Jarrett and Jack DeJohnette. One of the key musicians on the album, John McLaughlin, was not a regular member of Miles Davis's band during the time of recording. Davis said he called McLaughlin at the last minute to join the band for the last of four nights they recorded live at the Cellar Door, as Davis was "looking for an element he hadn't quite nailed down" on the previous nights, though most of the other band members contradicted this, with Bartz saying "We did know that the weekend was going to be for a possible recording, and that ["Mahavishnu" John McLaughlin] would come for the weekend. Miles had in the back of his mind that this would be for a possible album."

== Cover artwork ==
The album cover was illustrated by artist Mati Klarwein. Klarwein had painted the front cover independently of Davis, but the back cover was painted with a suggestion from Davis:

"I was doing the picture of the pregnant woman for the cover and the day I finished, Miles called me up and said, 'I want a picture of life on one side and evil on the other.' And all he mentioned was a toad. Then next to me was a copy of Time Magazine which had J. Edgar Hoover on the cover, and he just looked like a toad. I told Miles I found the toad."

Record club pressings of the album simply had the album title printed on a black cover.

== Critical reception ==
Retrospective professional reviews
Review scores
Source	Rating
All Music Guide to Jazz	5/5 stars
Christgau's Record Guide	A−
DownBeat	2.5/5 stars
The Encyclopedia of Popular Music	4/5 stars
Entertainment Weekly	A−
Los Angeles Times	3.5/4 stars
MusicHound Jazz	3/5 stars
The Penguin Guide to Jazz	4/4 stars
Pitchfork	9.9/10
The Rolling Stone Album Guide	4.5/5 stars
Sputnikmusic	4/5

Live-Evil was released by Columbia Records in 1971 to critical acclaim. In a contemporary review for Rolling Stone, Robert Palmer said "this sounds like what Miles had in mind when he first got into electric music and freer structures and rock rhythms". He called the shorter, ballad-like recordings "things of great beauty", devoid of solos but full of "stunning, bittersweet lines", while also praising each band member's soloing on the live jams: "Everybody is just playing away, there aren't any weak links, and there isn't any congestion to speak of. Miles reacts to this happy situation by playing his ass off, too". Black World critic Red Scott remarked that all of Live-Evil's songs "fuse into a perfect complement of musicians passing moods to each other". Pete Welding from DownBeat was less enthusiastic in a two-and-a-half star review, finding the live recordings characterized by "long dull stretches of water-treading alternating with moments of strength and inspiration".

The magazine's John Corbett later called Live-Evil "an outstandingly creative electric collage", while Erik Davis from Spin found the music "kinetic" and described McLaughlin's playing as "Hindu heavy-metal fretwork". Pitchfork's Ryan Schreiber believed it was "easily the most accessible of Miles Davis' late-'70s [sic] electric releases", describing its music as "at once both sexually steamy and unsettling". He said the live recordings "run the gamut from barroom brawl action-funk to sensual bedroom jazz magic, creating two hours of charged eccentricity you'll never forget". Robert Christgau said that apart from the meandering "Inamorata", the "long pieces are usually fascinating and often exciting", including "Funky Tonk", which he called Davis's "most compelling rhythmic exploration to date". He believed the shorter pieces sounded like "impressionistic experiments", while "Selim" and "Nem Um Talvez" appropriately "hark back to the late '50s". Edwin C. Faust from Stylus Magazine called Live-Evil "one of the funkiest albums ever recorded" while deeming the "somber" short pieces to be "haunting examples of musical purity—Miles enriching our ears with evocative melodies (his work on Sketches of Spain comes to mind) while the bass creeps cautiously, an organ hums tensly, and human whistles/vocals float about forebodingly like wistful phantoms".

== Track listing ==
Side one
No.	Title	Writer(s)	Length
1.	"Sivad"	Miles Davis	15:16
2.	"Little Church"	Hermeto Pascoal	3:17
3.	"Medley: Gemini/Double Image"	Davis/Joe Zawinul	5:56

Side two
No.	Title	Writer(s)	Length
1.	"What I Say"	Davis	21:12
2.	"Nem Um Talvez"	Pascoal	4:03

Side three
No.	Title	Writer(s)	Length
1.	"Selim"	Pascoal	2:15
2.	"Funky Tonk"	Davis	23:28

Side four
No.	Title	Writer(s)	Length
1.	"Inamorata and Narration by Conrad Roberts"	Davis	26:29
Total length:			101:56

== Personnel and recording sources ==
The live tracks on Live-Evil were truncated edits of various live jams recorded at The Cellar Door in 1970. Below is a list of each track with its corresponding source performances (which were released in the 2005 box set The Cellar Door Sessions 1970).

Side one (25:50)
1. "Sivad" (15:13)
(Recorded December 19, 1970 at The Cellar Door, Washington, DC & May 19, 1970 at Columbia Studio B, New York, NY)

- Miles Davis – electric trumpet with wah-wah
- Gary Bartz – soprano and alto saxophone
- John McLaughlin – electric guitar
- Keith Jarrett – electric piano, organ
- Michael Henderson – electric bass
- Jack DeJohnette – drums
- Airto Moreira – percussion

2. "Little Church" (3:14)
(Recorded June 4, 1970 at Columbia Studio B, New York, NY)

- Miles Davis – trumpet
- Steve Grossman – soprano saxophone
- Herbie Hancock, Chick Corea – electric piano
- Keith Jarrett – organ
- John McLaughlin – electric guitar
- Dave Holland – electric bass, acoustic bass
- Jack DeJohnette – drums
- Airto Moreira – percussion
- Hermeto Pascoal – drums, whistling, voice, electric piano

3. "Medley: Gemini/Double Image" (5:53)
(Recorded February 6, 1970 at Columbia Studio B, New York, NY)

- Miles Davis – trumpet
- Wayne Shorter – soprano saxophone
- Joe Zawinul, Chick Corea – electric piano
- John McLaughlin – electric guitar
- Dave Holland – acoustic bass
- Khalil Balakrishna – electric sitar
- Billy Cobham – drums
- Jack DeJohnette – drums
- Airto Moreira – percussion

Side two (25:12)
1. "What I Say" (21:09)
(Recorded December 19, 1970 at The Cellar Door, Washington, DC)

- Miles Davis – electric trumpet with wah-wah
- Gary Bartz – soprano and alto saxophone
- John McLaughlin – electric guitar
- Keith Jarrett – electric piano, organ
- Michael Henderson – electric bass
- Jack DeJohnette – drums
- Airto Moreira – percussion

2. "Nem Um Talvez" (4:03)
(Recorded June 3, 1970 at Columbia Studio B, New York, NY)

- Miles Davis – trumpet
- Steve Grossman – soprano saxophone
- Herbie Hancock, Chick Corea – electric piano
- Keith Jarrett – organ
- Ron Carter – acoustic bass
- Jack DeJohnette – drums
- Airto Moreira – percussion
- Hermeto Pascoal – drums, vocals

Side three (25:38)
1. "Selim" (2:12)
(Recorded June 3, 1970 at Columbia Studio B, New York, NY)

- Miles Davis – trumpet
- Steve Grossman – soprano saxophone
- Herbie Hancock, Chick Corea – electric piano
- Keith Jarrett – organ
- Ron Carter – acoustic bass
- Jack DeJohnette – drums
- Airto Moreira – percussion
- Hermeto Pascoal – drums, vocals

2. "Funky Tonk" (23:26)
(Recorded December 19, 1970 at The Cellar Door, Washington, DC)

- Miles Davis – electric trumpet with wah-wah
- Gary Bartz – soprano and alto saxophone
- John McLaughlin – electric guitar
- Keith Jarrett – electric piano, organ
- Michael Henderson – electric bass
- Jack DeJohnette – drums
- Airto Moreira – percussion

Side four (26:29)
1. "Inamorata and Narration by Conrad Roberts" (26:29)
(Recorded December 19, 1970 at The Cellar Door, Washington, DC)

- Miles Davis – electric trumpet with wah-wah
- Gary Bartz – soprano and alto saxophone
- John McLaughlin – electric guitar
- Keith Jarrett – electric piano, organ
- Michael Henderson – electric bass
- Jack DeJohnette – drums
- Airto Moreira – percussion
- Conrad Roberts – vocal narration, poem

Note: The Cellar Door Sessions 1970 box set uses the titles "Improvisation #4" (for Keith Jarrett's keyboard intro) and "Inamorata" instead of "Funky Tonk".

== See also ==
- The Cellar Door Sessions 1970

== Bibliography ==
- Christgau, Robert (October 13, 1981). Christgau's Record Guide: Rock Albums of the Seventies. Ticknor & Fields. ISBN 0899190251.
- Considine, J. D.; et al. (November 2, 2004). Brackett, Nathan; Hoard, Christian (eds.). The New Rolling Stone Album Guide: Completely Revised and Updated 4th Edition. Simon & Schuster. ISBN 0-7432-0169-8.
- Cook, Richard; Morton, Brian (1992). The Penguin Guide to Jazz on CD, LP and Cassette. Penguin Books. ISBN 0140153640.
