= Craig McMullen =

- Born: 11 October 1973 (age 53) Brisbane, Australia
- Height: 5 ft 11 in (180 cm)
- Weight: 185 lb (84 kg)
- School: Scots College
- Notable relative: Ken McMullen (father)
- Occupation: Rugby agent

Rugby union career
- Position: Centre / Fly-half
Amateur team(s)
| Years | Team | Apps | (Points) |
| 1993–01 | Randwick | | |
Senior career
| Years | Team | Apps | (Points) |
| 1999 | Bristol Bears | | |
| 2001–02 | Union Bordeaux Bègles | | |
| 2002–03 | Leicester Tigers | | |
| 2003–04 | RC Narbonne | | |
| 2005 | Leeds Tykes | | |
| 2005–06 | ASM Clermont | | |
| 2006–07 | Harlequins | | |
| 2007 | Saracens | | |
| 2007–08 | Gran Parma Rugby | | |
Provincial / State sides
| Years | Team | Apps | (Points) |
| 2004 | Southland | | |
Super Rugby
| Years | Team | Apps | (Points) |
| 1998–01 | Brumbies | | |

Craig McMullen (born 11 October 1973) is an Australian former professional rugby union player.

== Early life ==
McMullen, born in Brisbane, is the son of 1960s Wallabies scrum-half Ken McMullen and was educated at Sydney's Scots College. He was an Australian Schoolboys representative and later won selection for the Emerging Wallabies.

== Rugby career ==
A utility back, McMullen was a Randwick first-grade player and in 1998 got signed by the ACT Brumbies, where he played four seasons of Super 12 rugby. He then had several years in European professional rugby, winning the 2004–05 Powergen Cup with Leeds Tykes, amongst stints in France and Italy, before retiring aged 35.

McMullen is now a rugby agent in France.

== Personal life ==
McMullen was previously in a relationship with Irish television presenter Amanda Byram.
