= Karen Souza =

Argentinian jazz singer

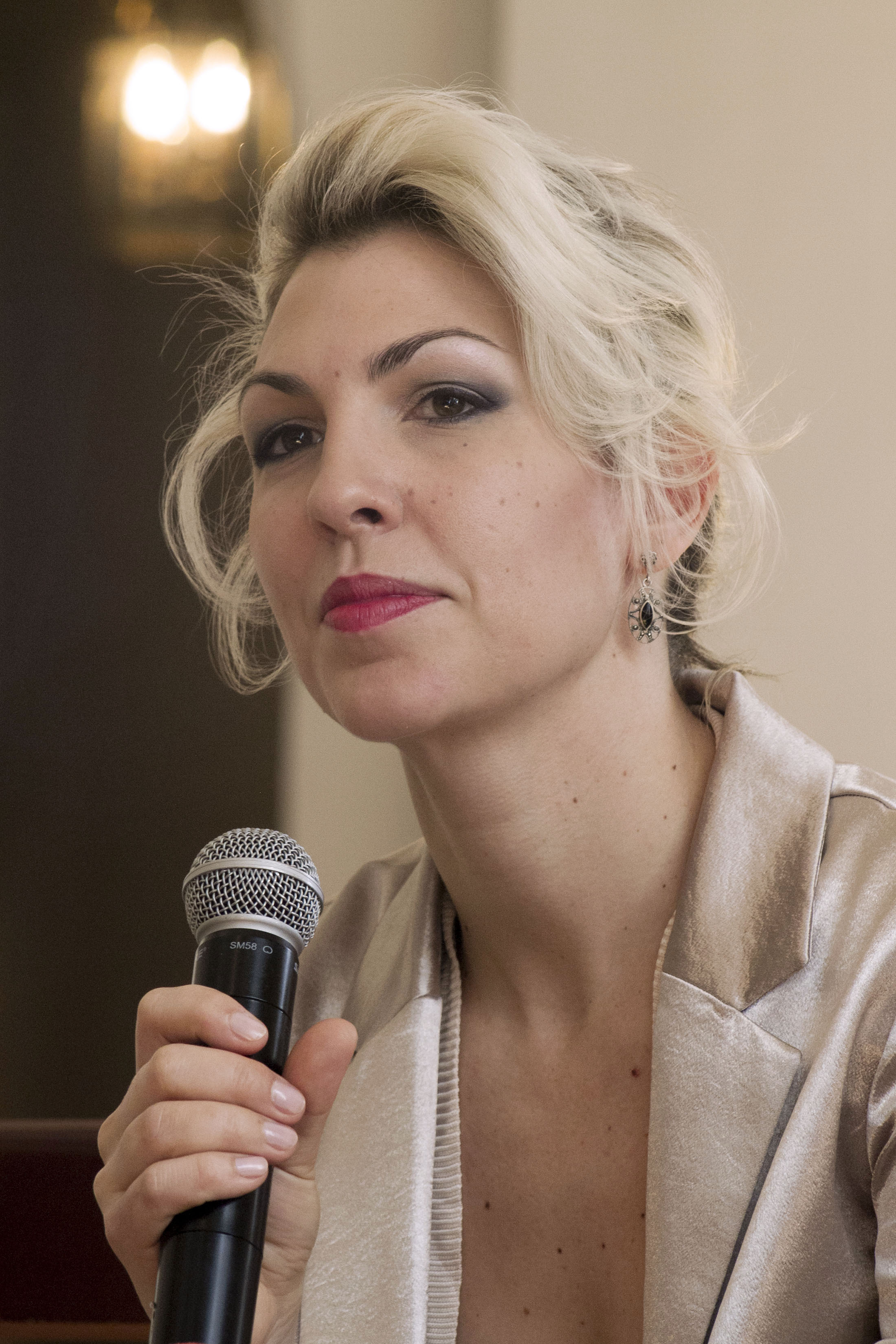

Background information
- Also known as: Privé, Pacha Ibiza, FTV
- Born: January 10, 1984 (age 42); La Pampa, Argentina
- Genres: Jazz, vocal jazz, bossa nova, smooth jazz
- Occupations: Singer, songwriter, producer
- Years active: 2002–present
- Labels: JVC, Music Brokers
- Website: karensouza.com

Karen Souza (born January 10, 1984) is an Argentinian jazz and bossa nova singer.

== Career ==
Souza began her career by providing vocals for producers of electronic music. Under pseudonyms she sang versions of hits songs from the 1970s, 1980s, and 1990s, such as "Creep" by Radiohead and "Do You Really Want to Hurt Me" by Culture Club. Her version of "Creep" was used in the film The Zero Theorem (2013). In 2010, she performed at Blue Note Tokyo and signed a contract with JVC Victor in Japan. She has toured in Venezuela, Brazil, Mexico, China, Korea, Spain, and Italy.

== Discography ==
- Essentials (Music Brokers, 2011)
- Hotel Souza (Music Brokers, 2012)
- Essentials II (Music Brokers, 2014)
- Velvet Vault (Music Brokers, 2017)
- Language of Love (Victor, 2020)
- Suddenly Lovers (Victor, 2023)
