= The Zutons discography =

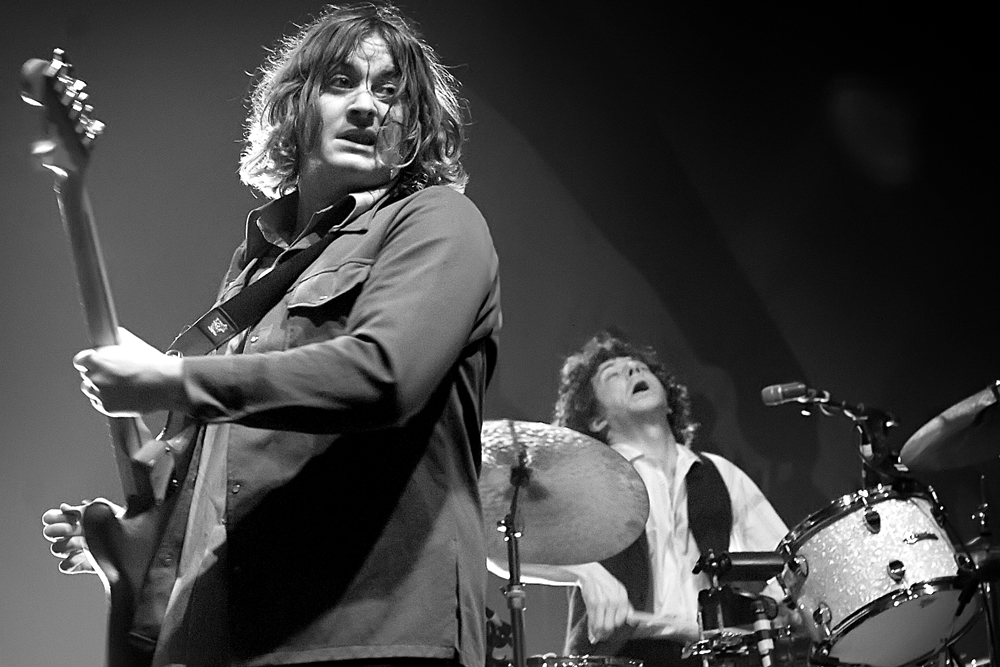
- The Zutons performing live. From left to right: Dave McCabe and Sean Payne
- Studio albums: 4
- Live albums: 2
- Singles: 14
- Music videos: 14

English rock band the Zutons have released four studio albums and 14 singles, nine of which entered the top 40 of the UK Singles Chart.

The band released their debut album, Who Killed...... The Zutons?, in April 2004 to critical acclaim and it sold well, reaching number 6 on the UK Albums Chart with platinum status. Five singles were released from the album: "Pressure Point", "You Will You Won't", "Remember Me", "Don't Ever Think (Too Much)" and "Confusion", all released in 2004 and reaching numbers 19, 22, 39, 15 and 37 on the UK Singles Chart respectively.

In 2006, the Zutons released their second album, Tired of Hanging Around. It sold well and reached number 2 on the UK Albums Chart, going platinum. From this album, they released four singles: "Why Won't You Give Me Your Love?", "Valerie", "Oh Stacey (Look What You've Done!)" and "It's the Little Things We Do" all in 2006 reaching numbers 9, 9, 24 and 47 on the UK Singles Chart respectively.

In June 2008, the band released their third studio album, You Can Do Anything, which peaked at number 6 on the UK Albums Chart. They released two singles from the album: "Always Right Behind You", which reached number 26 on the UK Singles Chart, and "What's Your Problem", which did not chart.

== Albums ==
=== Studio albums ===
List of studio albums, with selected details, peak chart positions and certifications
Title	Details	Peak chart positions								Certifications (sales threshold)
Title	Details	UK	UK Indie	AUS Hit.	EU	FRA	IRE	SCO	US Heat	Certifications (sales threshold)
Who Killed...... The Zutons?	Release date: 19 April 2004; Label: Deltasonic; Formats: CD, CS, DL, LP	6	—	—	—	122	31	10	34	BPI: 2× Platinum
Tired of Hanging Around	Release date: 17 April 2006; Label: Deltasonic; Formats: CD, CD+DVD-V, DL, LP	2	—	12	12	—	24	2	—	BPI: Platinum; IRMA: Gold
You Can Do Anything	Release date: 2 June 2008; Label: Deltasonic; Formats: CD, DL, LP	6	—	—	—	—	24	7	—	BPI: Silver
The Big Decider	Release date: 26 April 2024; Label: Icepop; Formats: CD, DL, LP	7	1	—	—	—	—	8	—	
"—" denotes releases that did not chart

=== Live albums ===
Title	Details
The Zutons Live	Release date: 14 December 2004; Label: Deltasonic; Formats: DL
iTunes Live: London Festival '08	Release date: 18 July 2008; Label: Deltasonic/iTunes UK; Formats: DL

== Singles ==
Title	Year	Peak chart positions								Certifications	Album
Title	Year	UK	UK Rock	EUR	IRE	SCO	SWI Air.	UKR	US Alt	Certifications	Album
"Devil's Deal"	2002	119	—	—	—	—	—	—	—		Non-album singles
"Creepin' an' a Crawlin'"	2003	—	—	—	—	—	—	—	—		Non-album singles
"Haunts Me"	2003	—	—	—	—	—	—	—	—		Non-album singles
"Pressure Point"	2004	19	13	—	—	26	—	—	29		Who Killed...... The Zutons?
"You Will You Won't"	2004	22	—	—	—	22	—	—	—		Who Killed...... The Zutons?
"Remember Me"	2004	39	—	—	—	44	—	—	—		Who Killed...... The Zutons?
"Don't Ever Think (Too Much)"	2004	15	—	—	—	21	—	—	—		Who Killed...... The Zutons?
"Confusion"	2004	37	—	—	—	41	—	—	—		Who Killed...... The Zutons?
"Why Won't You Give Me Your Love?"	2006	9	—	18	36	8	—	—	—		Tired of Hanging Around
"Valerie"	2006	9	—	12	32	8	98	168	—	BPI: Platinum	Tired of Hanging Around
"Oh Stacey (Look What You've Done!)"	2006	24	—	73	—	15	—	—	—		Tired of Hanging Around
"It's the Little Things We Do"	2006	47	—	—	—	27	—	—	—		Tired of Hanging Around
"Always Right Behind You"	2008	26	—	—	—	12	—	—	—		You Can Do Anything
"What's Your Problem"	2008	— (Note: "What's Your Problem" did not enter the UK Singles Chart, but peaked at number 29 on the UK Physical Singles Chart Top 100.)	—	—	—	28	—	—	—		You Can Do Anything
"Creeping on the Dancefloor"	2024	— (Note: "Creeping on the Dancefloor" did not enter the UK Singles Chart, but peaked at number 24 on the UK Physical Singles Chart Top 100.)	—	—	—	—	—	—	—		The Big Decider
"—" denotes releases that did not chart

== Album appearances ==
Year	Song	Album
2005	"Remember Me"	Acoustic '05
2009	"Runaway"	Rhythms del Mundo Classics
