= The Liverpool Sound =

2008 concert in Liverpool, England

- Genre: Rock
- Dates: 1 June 2008
- Location: Liverpool
- Years active: 2008
- Founders: Liverpool Culture Company
- Website: Official Site

The Liverpool Sound was a concert held at Anfield stadium in Liverpool on 1 June 2008 to celebrate the city's year as the European Capital of Culture. The concert was headlined by former Beatle Sir Paul McCartney, playing in his home city for the first time in five years.

== Venue ==
Anfield, home to Liverpool Football Club, played host to its first concert since the Hillsborough Justice Concert held 11 years earlier in 1997.

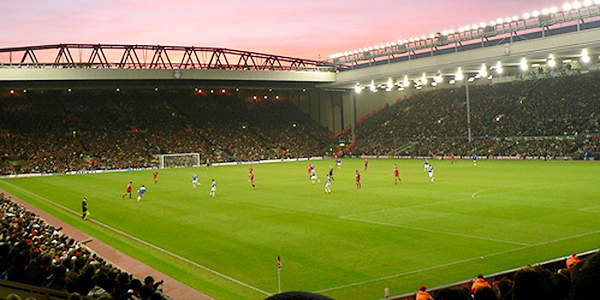
Anfield, home to Liverpool Football Club

Despite modernisation over the years, the nature of the 124-year-old stadium created a number of problems. The stadium's normal capacity of 45,362 was not realistic for a rock concert. Whilst 15,000 tickets were allocated for pitch-standing, seating in the stands had to be significantly reduced to meet health and safety standards. The stadium, built exclusively for football, was not equipped for such an event despite it dealing with sell-out crowds throughout the football season. This resulted in a total capacity for the event of 36,000.

The stage was constructed at the Anfield Road end of the stadium. The size of the entrances to the stadium (designed to accommodate the movement of people rather than stage equipment) meant that the stage had to be lifted in by crane before being constructed. The stage eclipsed the two-tier Anfield Road stand. The name of the city in giant letters, set against outlines of famous local landmarks, adorned the top of the structure.

Liverpool City Council gave £1.7 million to MPL Communications to cover costs such as stage and lighting hire, licence fees and insurance. Neither McCartney nor Liverpool F.C. charged a fee - seeing the event as their contribution to the city's European Capital of Culture year.

Notable attendees included Yoko Ono and Olivia Harrison - widows of McCartney's former bandmates John Lennon and George Harrison - who were sat together in the audience. McCartney's daughter, fashion designer Stella McCartney, who had hosted a presentation earlier in the day at the Liverpool Institute for Performing Arts, was also seen watching her father in the wings of the stage. Liverpool F.C. manager Rafael Benítez, normally resident in the ground's technical area was in attendance as was a member of his playing staff, Jamie Carragher. Former Liverpool F.C. player and manager Kenny Dalglish and local born footballer Wayne Rooney of Manchester United F.C. with his fiancée Coleen McLoughlin were also in the crowd.

== Line-up ==
- Paul McCartney (with guest appearance by Dave Grohl)
- Peter Kay
- Kaiser Chiefs
- The Zutons

== The Zutons ==
Local band The Zutons opened the concert.

Set List

1. Zuton Fever
2. Don't Ever Think
3. Why Won't You Give Me Your Love?
4. Pressure Point
5. What's Your Problem
6. Confusion
7. Valerie
8. Dirty Dancehall
9. Always Right Behind You
10. You Will You Won't

== Kaiser Chiefs ==
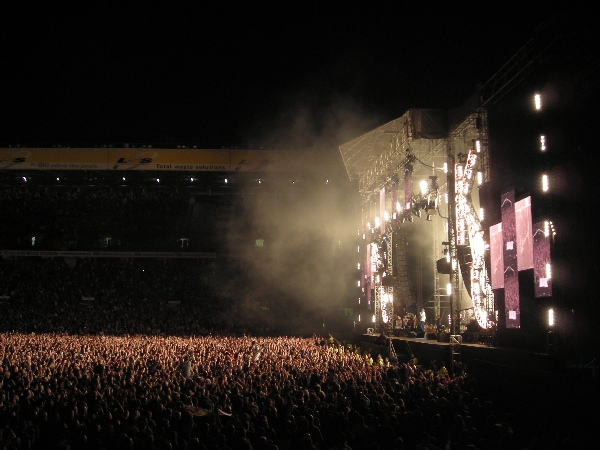
Kaiser Chiefs playing Elland Road, Leeds, eight days prior to The Liverpool Sound

Kaiser Chiefs played to their second football stadium crowd in the space of eight days having played their own homecoming show at Elland Road, Leeds, on 24 May 2008.

Set List

1. Everything Is Average Nowadays
2. Everyday I Love You Less and Less
3. Heat Dies Down
4. Ruby
5. Never Miss A Beat
6. Modern Way
7. Half The Truth
8. Na Na Na Na Naa
9. I Predict a Riot
10. You Want History
11. The Angry Mob
12. Take My Temperature
13. Oh My God

== Peter Kay ==
McCartney was introduced by comedian Peter Kay. Kay described him as "a local lad who's done very well for himself in the music game" and has "played with some amazing people over the years: Stevie Wonder, Rupert the Bear and The Beatles." He jokingly thanked the crowd for coming out and "missing the last episode of Ultimate Force with Ross Kemp" and claimed he was dismayed that the previous day's soundcheck had revealed McCartney would neither be breakdancing nor including a Right Said Fred medley in his set.

== Paul McCartney ==
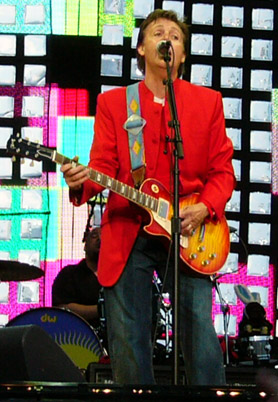
The Liverpool Sound's headliner, Sir Paul McCartney

McCartney's appearance marked the fifth anniversary of his last appearance in his home city and one month after his fourth classical album, Ecce Cor Meum, had been performed at Liverpool Cathedral. He played for approximately two hours, playing songs from his Beatles, Wings and solo career.

He opened his set with the Chan Romero song Hippy Hippy Shake - a song covered by The Swinging Blue Jeans in 1963 but played live by numerous Merseybeat acts prior (The Beatles included). A tribute to George Harrison was made in the rendition of Something - performed on a ukulele given to McCartney as a gift by Harrison - midway through his performance. The encore included the first live performance by a Beatle of A Day in the Life which led into a rousing rendition of The Plastic Ono Band's Give Peace a Chance in front of a giant CND symbol. Yoko Ono was seen smiling with approval as the crowd sang her late husband's peace anthem. The morning after the concert, Liverpool newspapers claimed the show to be McCartney's best ever gig.

Set List

1. Hippy Hippy Shake
2. Jet
3. Drive My Car
4. Flaming Pie
5. Got to Get You into My Life
6. Let Me Roll It
7. My Love
8. C Moon
9. The Long and Winding Road
10. Dance Tonight
11. Blackbird
12. Calico Skies
13. In Liverpool
14. I'll Follow The Sun
15. Eleanor Rigby
16. Something
17. Penny Lane
18. Band on the Run (with Dave Grohl on guitar)
19. Back in the U.S.S.R. (with Dave Grohl on drums)
20. Live and Let Die
21. Let It Be
22. Hey Jude

Encore

23. Yesterday
24. A Day in the Life/Give Peace a Chance
25. Lady Madonna
26. I Saw Her Standing There (with Dave Grohl on drums)

== Dave Grohl ==
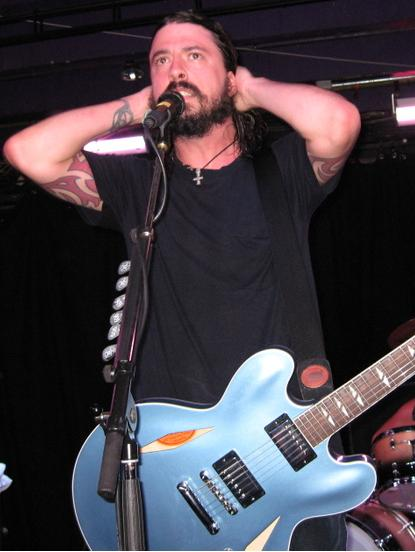
Dave Grohl supported McCartney on three songs

McCartney was joined on stage for three songs by former Nirvana drummer and Foo Fighters frontman, Dave Grohl. Grohl played guitar on the Paul McCartney & Wings' hit "Band on the Run" before taking to the drums on "Back in the U.S.S.R.". He rejoined the band to drum on the closing number, "I Saw Her Standing There".
