= Who Killed the Zutons? =

Who Killed...... The Zutons?

Studio album by the Zutons
- Released: 19 April 2004
- Recorded: 2003
- Studios: RAK, London; Parr Street, Liverpool; Toe Rag, London
- Genres: Folk; garage rock; indie pop
- Length: 40:01
- Label: Deltasonic
- Producers: Ian Broudie, Liam Watson

The Zutons chronology
Who Killed...... The Zutons? (2004)	Tired of Hanging Around (2006)

Singles from Who Killed...... The Zutons?
- 1. "Pressure Point" Released: 19 January 2004; 2. "You Will You Won't" Released: 5 April 2004; 3. "Remember Me" Released: 21 June 2004; 4. "Don't Ever Think (Too Much)" Released: 11 October 2004; 5. "Confusion" Released: 13 December 2004

Who Killed...... The Zutons? is the debut studio album by the English rock band the Zutons, released via Deltasonic on 19 April 2004.

== Background and recording ==
The Zutons formed in early 2002; their line-up initially consisted of Dave McCabe on vocals and guitar, Boyan Chowdhury on guitar, Russell Pritchard on bass and Sean Payne on drums, with Abi Harding joining them sometime later on saxophone. They signed to Deltasonic, who were known for releasing the work of the Coral. "Devil's Deal", the Zuton's debut single, appeared in September 2002, and was followed up by "Creepin' an' a Crawlin'" in May 2003. For their debut album, they worked with producer Ian Broudie of the Lightning Seeds, who had previously worked with the Coral. Jon Gray served as engineer; the bulk of the tracks were recorded at RAK Studios in London, while "You Will You Won't" and "Long Time Coming" were done at Parr Street Studios in Liverpool. The NME reported that the band were finishing up the album in December 2003. Most of the songs were mixed at Elevator Studios in Liverpool, except for "Confusion", "Railroad" and "Remember Me", which were done at RAK. Ted Jensen then mastered the album at Sterling Sound at New York City. In August 2004, "Don't Ever Think (Too Much)" was recorded at Toe Rag Studios in London. Made with producer and engineer Liam Watson, The track was mastered by Noel Summerville at Transfermation, also in London.

== Composition and lyrics ==
Musically, the sound of the album has been described as folk, garage rock and indie pop, rooted in blues rock. AllMusic reviewer Jason Damas compared the band's sound to that of their labelmates the Coral, "from their Love/Animals-influenced ruckus down to their Scouse accents". Exclaim! writer Cam Lindsay said the band "fus[ed] swampy blues, '60s psych-rock, offbeat folk and the timeless Liverpudlian pop hooks" of bands the Beatles, the La's and Shack. Gareth Gobson of Drowned in Sound thought that as the Zutons had a "decidedly darker heart than their current Liverpudlian peers", he considered a comparison to brothers John and Michael Head of Shack was more appropriate. Other comparisons were made to the work of Led Zeppelin, Traffic and Frank Zappa. Blender's Jody Rosen said they merged a "hodgepodge of influences (Dr. John, old-ska, trashy ’60s garage rock, Johnny Cash) with goofy B-movie atmosphere, then turn up the fuzztones". BBC Music reviewer Richard Banks wrote that McCabe "classes the band's sound as a 'soul-funk-voodoo vibe'" as highlighted in "Zuton Fever" and "Dirty Dancehall", "but touches of ska and country are also discernible". Prabjote Osahn arranged the strings, which were performed by Osahn, Stella Page, Amanda Drummond and Isabelle Dunn.

The album's opening track, "Zuton Fever", begins with a Spaghetti Western-type guitar riff; McCabe discuses bones, epidemics and having a fever. The subsequent saxophone and bass parts earned it a comparison to Eastern European folk music. McCabe said it was inspired by "Love Is an Epidemic" by the Ink Spots. "Pressure Point" is a garage boogie track, with doo-wop vocal harmonies, while McGabe's voice was reminiscent of Eric Burdon. NME writer Tim Jonze thought it "builds from an unhinged tribal warble into a screeching vocal meltdown". "You Will You Won't", which showcases McCabe's vocal range, evoked "Crosstown Traffic" (1968) by the Jimi Hendrix Experience. Rosen called "Confusion" a "Nashville-on-Mersey weeper" akin to "(Sittin' On) The Dock of the Bay" (1968) by Otis Redding, featuring Stax-esque parts from Harding and a bicycle horn. The band said Deltasonic founder Alan Wills was not impressed with the song's chorus, prompting McCabe to re-write it later the same day. The song's saxophone part was initially planned to be played on guitar until it was changed.

"Havana Gang Brawl" has Scouse-tinged jangly guitarwork, with an intro part that recalled the Zombies. It talks about turf wars, and was reminiscent of Dire Straits. "Railroad" describes a woman being sent a love letter from her immigrant-working partner. Chowdhury said McCabe played a Chinese-styled scale, to which he responded by saying: "right a song about the Chinese who built the railroads in America". "Long Time Coming" is a guitar pop song that comes across as a mix of the Coral and Franz Ferdinand, with harmonies that reminded McCabe of Tina Turner. "Nightmare Part II" is about having a fever dream. Entertainment Weekly writer Timothy Gunatilaka said Harding's "soulful fluttering adds a delicate beauty" to "Not a Lot to Do", which laments the inertia of a Sunday afternoon. "Remember Me" is a Merseybeat track driven by horns, which Dobson said served as a "eulogy to a best mate lost to romance". "Dirty Dancehall" is about McCabe's love–hate relationship with Liverpool. "Don't Ever Think (Too Much)" discusses a man who almost jumps off a cliff before he changes his mind; McCabe explained: "You know, about how your head races all the time. I think that’s part of growing up really, you don’t realise what’s wrong with you".

== Release ==
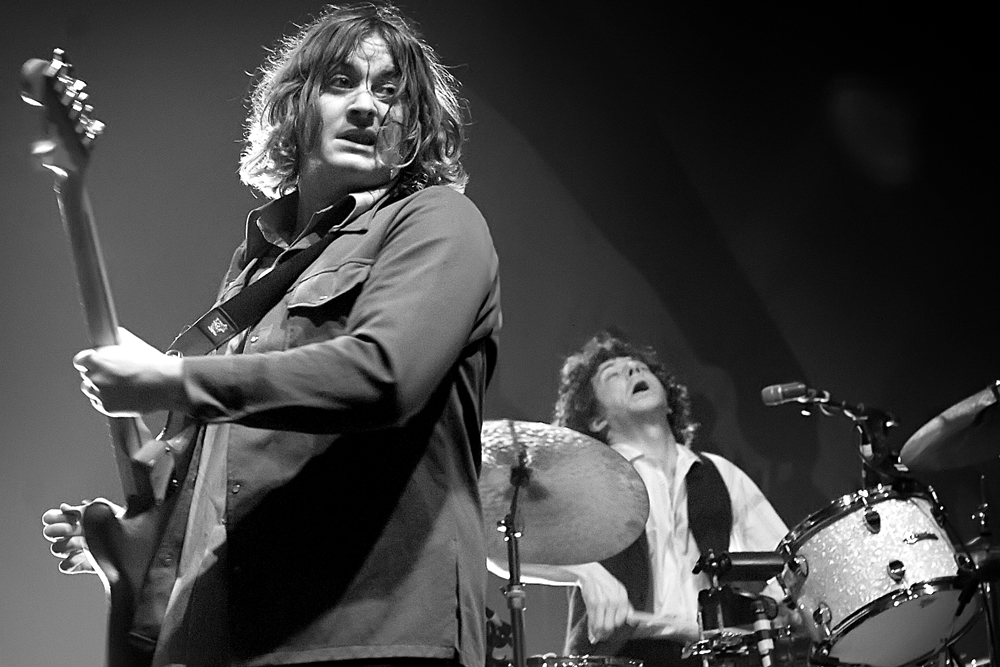
The Zutons toured throughout 2004 and 2005 for Who Killed...... The Zutons?.

In February 2004, the band went on tour with Dogs Die in Hot Cars; on 27 February 2004, Who Killed...... The Zutons? was announced for release in two months' time. In March 2004, the band toured as part of the NME Brat Pack Tour alongside 22-20s. "You Will You Won't" was released as a single on 5 April 2004. Who Killed...... The Zutons? was released on 19 April 2004 through Deltasonic. Early copies of the album came with a free bonus disc containing alternate versions of four Zutons tracks. The LP version came with Zutons brand 3D glasses. It was promoted an instore performance at the Virgin Megastores in London, and then with a UK tour that lasted until May 2004 with support from the Dead 60s. The last two shows were cancelled after Payne was taken to hospital after breaking his fingers. At the end of the month, the band went on a brief Japanese tour with Paul Maguire, formerly of the Stairs filling in, alongside the Bandits. The two cancelled shows were rescheduled for the following month, surrounding the release of "Remember Me" on 21 June 2004.

Shortly after this, the band performed at the Glastonbury Festival. In October 2004, the band embarked on a tour of the UK. The last four shows were postponed as Payne had come down with a viral infection. Coinciding with this, "Don't Ever Think (Too Much)" was released as a single on 4 October 2004. The US edition of the album, released 19 October 2004, closed with the single "Don't Ever Think (Too Much)". The UK reissue, released the previous day, also added this track onto the end. Following this, the band supported the Thrills on their headlining tour of the US. They then supported the Killers on their US tour, which included a one-off headlining show at the Museum of Modern Art in New York City. In December 2004, the band went on a short tour, with all of the postponed shows from earlier, culminating in two shows at the Royal Court Theatre in Liverpool. In the midst of this, they supported Muse for two shows at Earls Court Exhibition Centre in London. Harding was unable to join the Zutons for the Ireland dates on the trek as she has been diagnosed with sinusitis. "Confusion" was released as a single on 13 December 2004. In February 2005, the band embarked on a tour of the US; the following month, they played a short, four-date tour of the UK. In June and July 2005, the band supported R.E.M. on their headlining stadium tour of the UK. The Zutons pulled out of the Hyde Park, London date of the trek, and were replaced by Johnathan Rice and Feeder.

== Reception ==
Professional ratings
Aggregate scores
Source	Rating
Metacritic	73/100
Review scores
Source	Rating
AllMusic	2.5/5 stars
Alternative Press	5/5
Blender	3/5 stars
DIY	4/5 stars
Entertainment Weekly	B+
The Guardian	3/5 stars
NME	7/10
Pitchfork	7.8/10
Q	3/5 stars
Spin	B+

Who Killed...... The Zutons? was met with generally favourable reviews from music critics. At Metacritic, which assigns a normalized rating out of 100 to reviews from mainstream publications, the album received an average score of 73, based on 15 reviews.

Many reviewers remarked on the mix of musical styles. Damas said complimented the variety of older forms, "very much 'dad rock' if you will, though it's injected with just enough fun that it doesn't sound like an entirely retro exercise". He said the most effective "moments come when the band expands their sonic palette", highlighting "Remember Me". Blender writer Jody Rosen felt that the band "more than deliver on the promise of a deranged band name", as the mix of styles were "weird, hook-filled, and irresistible". The Guardian critic Dave Simpson praised Broudie's production work, saying that he had the "unenviable job of pulling these disparate strands [of different styles] into a cohesive pop record but has emerged with far more silk purse than sow's ear". NME writer Tim Jonze felt that since the band were "clearly in love with their city's musical heritage, they're also desperate to shake free from it", adding that they were "declaring war on bollocks retro rock". The staff at Spin said that "somewhere between the Beefheart reference and the Ray Davies paeans [...] they find a woolly warmth and loopy generosity" few acts have offered since the self-titled debut album (1999) of the Beta Band. Banks considered it to be an "ambitious but fully accomplished debut that promises good times are ahead for the Liverpool five-piece".

Several critics gave comparisons to the Coral. God Is in the TV's Alex Worsnip opened his review by remarking that the Zutons were the "first Coral tribute band" as the tracks "really could be mistaken by anyone for The Coral", from the instrumentation to McCabe's vocals. The Boston Phoenix writer Mikael Wood said the Zutons and the Coral had a shared sound, as they "view their loose, seemingly improvisational rock as a vessel to fill with whatever strikes their fancy". Damas said that it still "sounds like a lost Coral album down to every last detail, which means that it seems silly to venture here unless you've at least bought one Coral album already". Gobson, meanwhile, said it was "more accomplished and accessible than the first offering by the [Coral frontman James] Skelley crew", and explained that the "jangling trademark scouse pop" is what will "draw comparisons to the Hoylake lot". Simpson thought the Zutons were "if anything, more demented" than the Coral; adding to this, Pitchfork contributor Amanda Petrusich wrote that their "multi-decade larceny is more decisive and inventive than anything the Coral have unleashed". Gigwise's Vicky Roberts reasoned that it was "more likely that the ‘Liverpool scene’, and the farrago which surrounded it like a billow of class c smoke, is actually to blame" for the comparisons. Stephen Ackroyd of DIY dismissed the Coral comparison, saying that despite sharing the same record label and hometown, the similarities ended there. He said that the Zutons were "twice as vital as Skelley and co, and that's one hell of a claim", adding that they were "much darker than any of their contemporaries". musicOMH contributor John Murphy agreed, saying that there was "more discipline exerted here, with no reliance on the so-called 'wacky' pot-head humour that The Coral sometimes get too involved with".

Who Killed...... The Zutons charted at number six in the UK, where it would be certified double platinum by the British Phonographic Industry in 2013. It also peaked at number five in Scotland, number 31 in Ireland, number 34 on the Heatseekers Albums chart in the US and number 122 in France. It had been nominated for the Mercury Prize, though ultimately lost; it is included in the book 1001 Albums You Must Hear Before You Die.

== Track listing ==
All songs written by Dave McCabe and the Zutons, except "Railroad" by McCabe, Sean Payne and the Zutons.

1. "Zuton Fever" – 3:08
2. "Pressure Point" – 3:16
3. "You Will You Won't" – 2:54
4. "Confusion" – 3:32
5. "Havana Gang Brawl" – 4:30
6. "Railroad" – 3:39
7. "Long Time Coming" – 2:20
8. "Nightmare Part II" – 3:00
9. "Not a Lot to Do" – 3:47
10. "Remember Me" – 3:20
11. "Dirty Dancehall" – 4:09
12. "Moons and Horror Shows" – 2:38

UK reissue / US edition bonus track

13. "Don't Ever Think (Too Much)" – 2:42

== Personnel ==
Personnel per booklet.

The Zutons

- Dave McCabe – vocals, guitar
- Boyan Chowdhury – guitar
- Russell Pritchard – bass guitar
- Sean Payne – drums
- Abi Harding – saxophone

Additional musicians

- Prabjote Osahn – arranger, strings
- Stella Page – strings
- Amanda Drummond – strings
- Isabelle Dunn – strings

Production and design

- Ian Broudie – producer (all except "Don't Ever Think (Too Much)")
- Liam Watson – producer ("Don't Ever Think (Too Much)"), engineer ("Don't Ever Think (Too Much)")
- Jon Gray – engineer (all except "Don't Ever Think (Too Much)")
- Ted Jensen – mastering (all except "Don't Ever Think (Too Much)")
- Noel Summerville – mastering ("Don't Ever Think (Too Much)")
- Juno – art direction, design
- Sam Jones – photograph

== Charts ==
=== Weekly charts ===
Chart performance for Who Killed... The Zutons?
Chart (2004–2005)	Peak position
French Albums (SNEP)	122
Irish Albums (IRMA)	31
Scottish Albums (Official Charts)	5
UK Albums (Official Charts)	6
US Heatseekers Albums (Billboard)	34

=== Year-end charts ===
Year-end chart performance for Who Killed...... The Zutons?
Chart (2004)	Position
UK Albums (OCC)	46
Chart (2005)	Position
UK Albums (OCC)	137

== Certifications ==
Certifications for Who Killed...... The Zutons?
Region	Certification	Certified units/sales
United Kingdom (BPI)	2× Platinum	600,000^{^}
^{^} Shipments figures based on certification alone.

== See also ==
- The Coral – the 2002 album by labelmates the Coral, also produced by Broudie
