= Anfield =

Football stadium in Liverpool, England

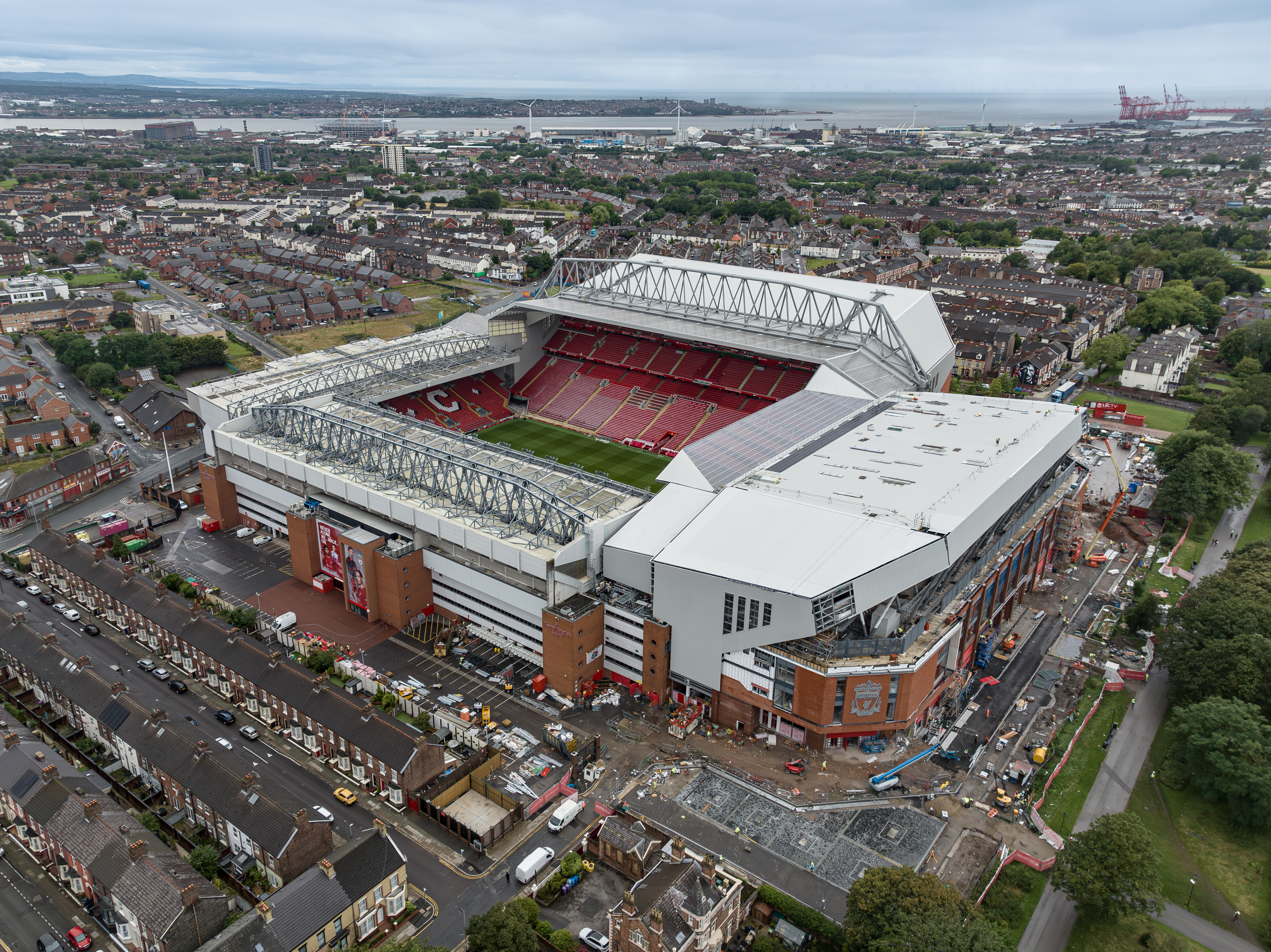
- View of Anfield in 2023
- Interactive map of Anfield
- Address: Anfield Road
- Location: Anfield; Liverpool, England; L4 0TH
- Coordinates: 53°25′51″N 2°57′39″W
- Owner: Liverpool F.C.
- Capacity: 61,276
- Executive suites: 64
- Record attendance: 61,905 (Liverpool v Wolverhampton Wanderers, 2 February 1952)
- Field size: 101 by 68 metres (110.5 yd × 74.4 yd)
- Public transit: Kirkdale

Construction
- Built: 1884; 142 years ago
- Opened: 1884
- Renovated: 1895, 1903, 1906, 1928, 1957, 1963, 1973, 1982, 1992, 1994, 1998, 2014–2016, 2021–2024

Tenants
- Everton (1884–1892); Liverpool (1892–present)

Anfield is a football stadium in the area of Anfield, Liverpool, England, which has been the home of Liverpool Football Club since their formation in 1892. The stadium has a seating capacity of 61,276, making it the fifth-largest football stadium in England. It was originally the home of Everton from 1884 to 1891 before they moved to Goodison Park after a dispute with Anfield owner and club president John Houlding, leading Houlding to form Liverpool F.C.

The stadium has four stands: the Spion Kop, the Main Stand, the Sir Kenny Dalglish Stand, and the Anfield Road End. The record attendance of 61,905 was set at a match between Liverpool and Wolverhampton Wanderers in 1952. The ground converted to an all-seater stadium in 1994 as a result of the Taylor Report, which reduced its capacity. Two gates at the stadium are named after former Liverpool managers: Bill Shankly and Bob Paisley. Both managers have been honoured with statues outside the stadium: Shankly's unveiled in 1997 by the Kop Stand and Paisley's in 2020 by the Main Stand. The ground is 2 miles (3 km) from Liverpool Lime Street railway station.

The club proposed relocating to a new stadium in the adjacent Stanley Park in 2002; after Fenway Sports Group acquired Liverpool in 2010, the decision was taken to expand Anfield instead. This extension opened to the public on 9 September 2016, increasing the stadium capacity to 54,074. Redevelopments were made to the Anfield Road Stand in 2024, which increased the stadium capacity to over 61,000.

== History ==
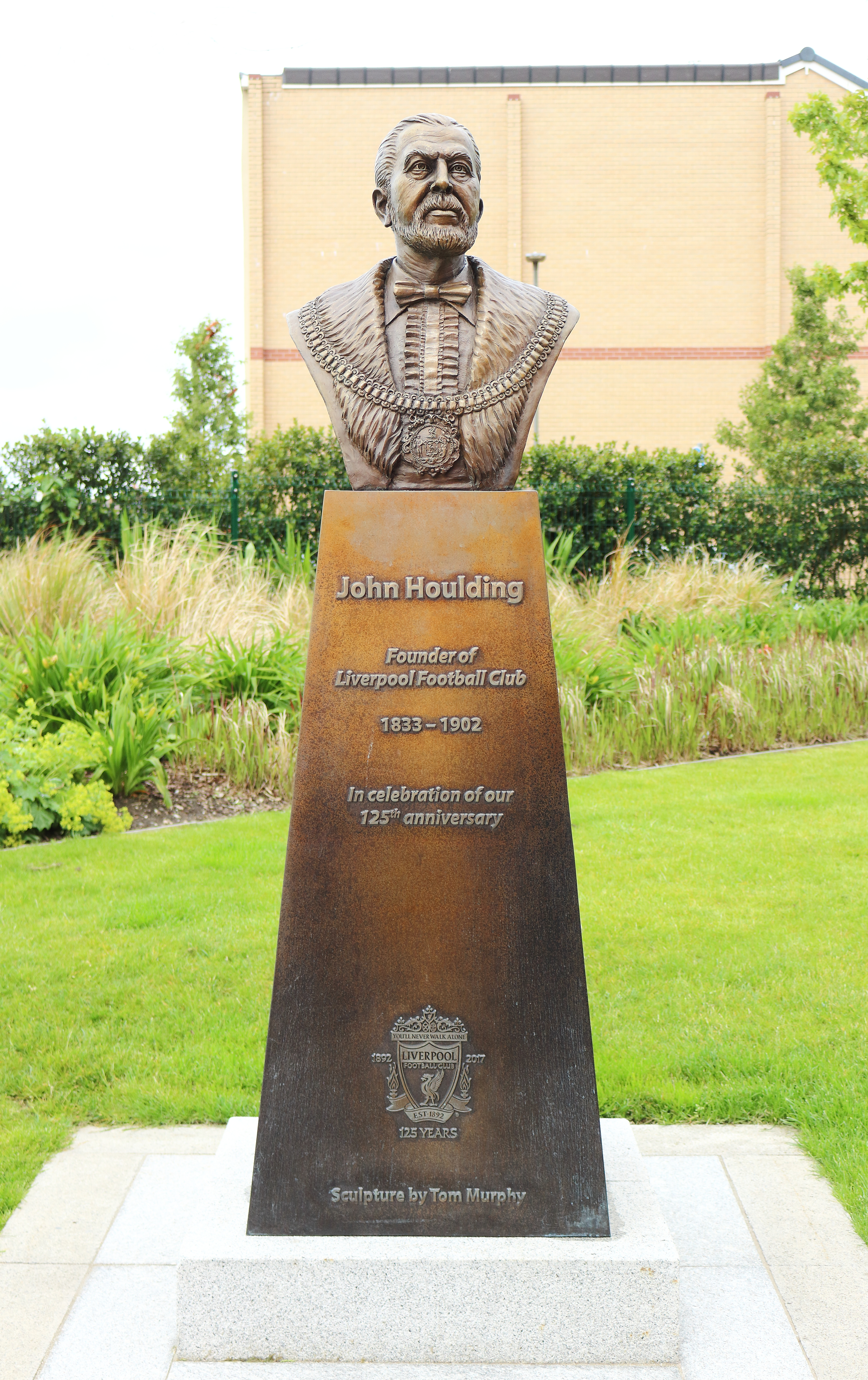
Memorial to John Houlding outside Anfield on the 125th anniversary of Liverpool F.C.

The stadium is named after the surrounding area, Anfield. The word originated in the combination of Old and Middle English words, which mean "a field on a slope". Anfield, and its deviations, has been associated with the area since at least 1642. It has been suggested that the name is linked to the influx of Irish people into the spreading city in the 1850s, and was associated with Annefield, outside New Ross, County Wexford, Ireland.

Opened in 1884, Anfield was originally owned by John Orrell, a minor landowner who was a friend of Everton member John Houlding. Everton, who previously played at Priory Road, needed a new venue owing to the noise produced by the crowd on match days. Orrell lent the pitch to the club in exchange for a small rent. The first match at the ground was between Everton and Earlestown on 28 September 1884, which Everton won 5–0. During Everton's tenure at the stadium, stands were erected for some of the 8,000-plus spectators regularly attending matches, although the ground was capable of holding around 20,000 spectators and occasionally did. The ground was considered of international standard at the time, playing host to the British Home Championship match between England and Ireland in 1889. Anfield's first league match was played on 8 September 1888, between Everton and Accrington F.C. Everton quickly improved as a team, and became Anfield's first league champions in the 1890–91 season.

In 1892, negotiations to purchase the land at Anfield from Orrell escalated into a dispute between Houlding and the Everton committee over how the club was run. Events culminated in Everton's move to Goodison Park. Houlding was left with an empty stadium and decided to form a new club to occupy it. The new team was called Liverpool F.C. and Athletic Grounds Ltd, and the club's first match at Anfield was a friendly played in front of 200 people on 1 September 1892, against Rotherham Town. Liverpool won 7–1.

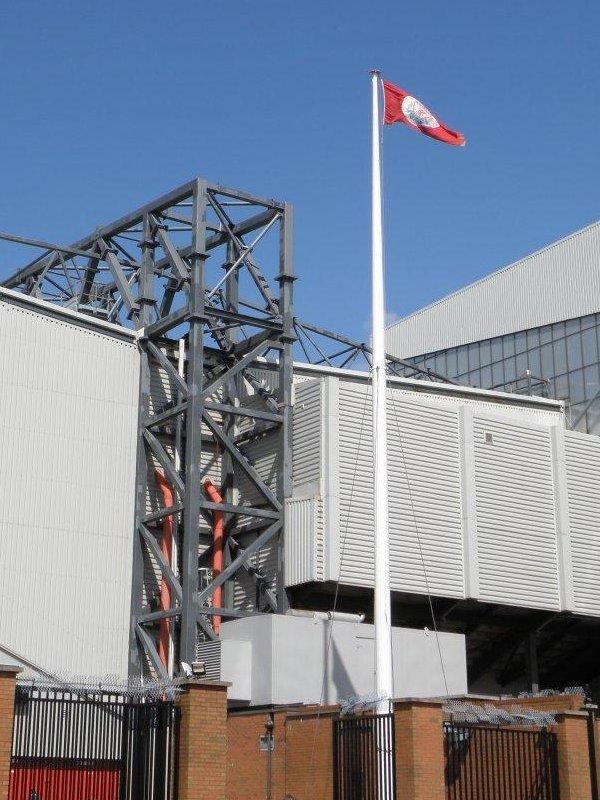
The topmast rescued from the SS Great Eastern

Liverpool's first Football League match at Anfield was played on 9 September 1893, against Lincoln City. Liverpool won 4–0 in front of 5,000 spectators. A new stand capable of holding 3,000 spectators was constructed in 1895 on the site of the present Main Stand. Designed by architect Archibald Leitch, the stand had a distinctive red and white gable, and was similar to the main stand at Newcastle United's ground St James' Park. Another stand was constructed at the Anfield Road end in 1903, built from timber and corrugated iron. After Liverpool had won their second League championship in 1906, a new stand was built along the Walton Breck Road. Local journalist Ernest Edwards, who was the sports editor of newspapers the Liverpool Daily Post and Echo, named it the Spion Kop; it was named after a famous hill in South Africa where a local regiment had suffered heavy losses during the Boer War in 1900. More than 300 men had died, many of them from Liverpool, as the British army attempted to capture the strategic hilltop. Around the same period, a stand was also built along Kemlyn Road.

The ground remained much the same until 1928, when the Kop was redesigned and extended to hold 30,000 spectators, all standing. A roof was erected as well. Many stadia in England had stands named after the Spion Kop. Anfield's was the largest Kop in the country at the time—it was able to hold more supporters than some entire football grounds. In the same year the topmast of the SS Great Eastern, one of the first iron ships, was rescued from the ship breaking yard at nearby Rock Ferry, and was hauled up Everton Valley by a team of horses, to be erected alongside the new Kop. It still stands there, serving as a flagpole.

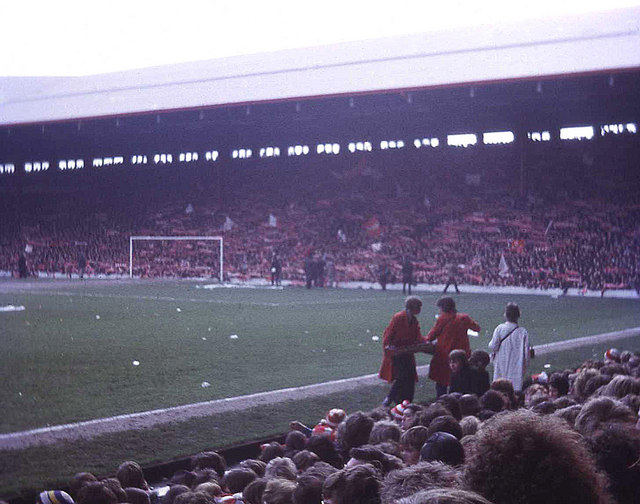
The Kop in 1974, before the Taylor Report recommended standing areas in football grounds be outlawed following the Hillsborough disaster in 1989.

Floodlights were installed at a cost of £12,000 in 1957. On 30 October, they were switched on for the first time for a match against Everton to commemorate the 75th anniversary of the Liverpool County Football Association. In 1963, the old Kemlyn Road stand was replaced by a cantilevered stand, built at a cost of £350,000, accommodating 6,700 spectators. Two years later, alterations were made at the Anfield Road end, turning it into a larger covered standing area with refreshments under the structure. The biggest redevelopment came in 1973, when the old Main Stand was partially demolished and extended backwards with a new roof. Simultaneously, the concrete pylon floodlights were demolished, with new lights installed along the rooflines of the Kemlyn Road and Main Stands. The new stand was officially opened by the Duke of Kent on 10 March 1973. In the 1980s, the paddock in front of the Main Stand was turned into seating, and in 1982, seats were introduced at the Anfield Road end. The Shankly Gates were erected in 1982, a tribute to former manager Bill Shankly; his widow Nessie unlocked them for the first time on 26 August 1982. Across the Shankly Gates are the words You'll Never Walk Alone, the title of the hit song by Gerry and the Pacemakers adopted by Liverpool fans as the club's anthem during Shankly's time as manager.

Coloured seats and a police room were added to the Kemlyn Road stand in 1987. After the Hillsborough disaster in 1989, when Police mismanagement led to overcrowding and the deaths of 97 Liverpool fans, the Taylor Report recommended that all grounds in the country should be converted into all-seater grounds by May 1994. A second tier was added to the Kemlyn Road stand in 1992, turning it into a double-decker layout. It included executive boxes and function suites as well as 11,000 seating spaces. Plans to expand the stand had been made earlier, with the club buying up houses on Kemlyn Road during the 1970s, and 1980s, but had to be put on hold until 1990 because two sisters, Joan and Nora Mason, refused to sell their house. When the club reached an agreement with the sisters in 1990, the expansion plans were put into action. The stand—renamed the Centenary Stand—was officially opened on 1 September 1992 by UEFA president Lennart Johansson. The Kop was rebuilt in 1994 after the recommendations of the Taylor Report and became all-seated; it is still a single tier, and the capacity was significantly reduced to 12,390.

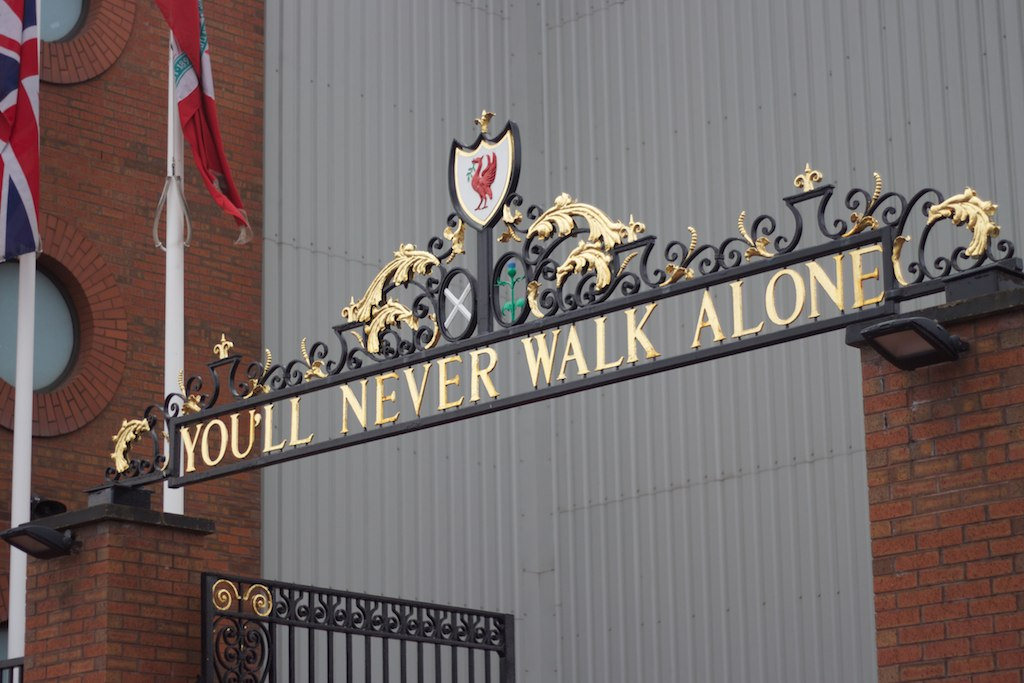
The Shankly Gates were erected in 1982 in tribute to Bill Shankly.

On 4 December 1997, a bronze statue of Bill Shankly was unveiled at the visitors' centre in front of the Kop. Standing at over 8 feet (2.4 m) tall, the statue depicts Shankly with a fan's scarf around his neck, in a familiar pose he adopted when receiving applause from fans. Inscribed on the statue are the words "Bill Shankly – He Made The People Happy". The Hillsborough memorial was situated alongside the Shankly Gates before it was moved next to 97 Avenue in front of the redeveloped main stand in 2016. The memorial is always decorated with flowers and tributes to the 97 people who died as a result of the disaster. At the centre of the memorial is an eternal flame, signifying that those who died will never be forgotten.

In 1998, a new two-tier Anfield Road end was opened. The stand has encountered some problems since its redevelopment; at the beginning of the 1999–2000 season, a series of support poles and stanchions had to be brought in to give extra stability to the top tier of the stand. During Ronnie Moran's testimonial match against Celtic, many fans complained of the movement of the top tier. At the same time that the stanchions were inserted, the executive seating area was expanded by two rows in the main stand, lowering the seating capacity in the paddock.

On 30 January 2020, a bronze statue of Bob Paisley was unveiled outside the Main Stand in Paisley Square. The statue was commissioned and donated by the club's main sponsor, Standard Chartered, to celebrate the ten-year anniversary of the relationship with the club. The statue is 8 ft (2.4 m) tall and depicts an iconic image of the club's history, Paisley carrying future club captain Emlyn Hughes off the field during a match against Tottenham Hotspur at Anfield in April 1968.

== Structures and facilities ==
Outline of Anfield pre-2015 redevelopment: The Sir Kenny Dalglish Stand (top), The Kop (right), Main Stand (bottom) and Anfield Road stand (left)

Anfield has 60,725 seats split between four stands: the Anfield Road end, the Sir Kenny Dalglish Stand, the Kop, and the Main Stand. The Anfield Road end and Sir Kenny Dalglish Stand are two-tiered, while the Kop is single-tiered and the Main Stand three-tiered. Entry to the stadium is gained by radio-frequency identification (RFID) smart cards rather than the traditional staffed turnstile. This system, used in all 80 turnstiles around Anfield, was introduced in 2005.

The Kop is a large single-tiered stand. Originally a large terraced banking providing accommodation for more than 30,000 spectators, the current incarnation was constructed in 1994–95 and is single-tiered with no executive boxes. The Kop houses the club's museum, the Reducate centre. The Kop is the most-renowned stand at Anfield among home and away supporters, with the people who occupy the stand referred to as kopites. Such is the reputation of the stand that it was claimed that the crowd in the Kop could suck the ball into the goal. Traditionally, Liverpool's most vocal supporters congregate in this stand. The Kop, which BBC Sport calls "one of the most famous ends of a stadium in world football", is the end where Liverpool traditionally attack towards in the second half of games.

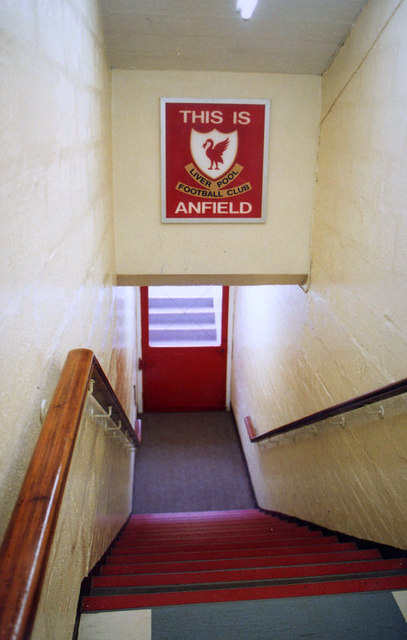
The "THIS IS ANFIELD" sign above the old tunnel to the pitch at Anfield. Installed by former manager Bill Shankly in 1972 to instil fear into the opposition, it is now located above the new tunnel entrance.

The oldest stand at Anfield is the Main Stand. The stand was completed in 2016; however, the lower section dates from 1906. The bottom tier of the stand houses the directors' box. The directors' VIP box is located at the rear of the lower tier of the stand. The old, large roof was supported by two thin central uprights, with a large suspended television camera gantry that had moved to the front of the third tier. The players' tunnel and the technical area where the managers and substitutes sit during the match are in the middle of the stand at pitch level. Above the stairs leading down to the pitch hung a sign stating "THIS IS ANFIELD". Installed by Shankly, its purpose was to both intimidate the opposition and to bring the Liverpool players who touch it good luck. Liverpool players and coaching staff traditionally reached up and placed one or both hands on it as they passed underneath.

The sign was temporarily removed during the most recent reconstruction of the Main Stand; it was placed at the exit from the new Main Stand tunnel to the pitch in advance of Liverpool's 2016–17 home opener. Then-Liverpool manager Jürgen Klopp had banned players from touching the restored sign until the team had won at least one major trophy. After winning the 2019 UEFA Champions League final his players were allowed to do so again.

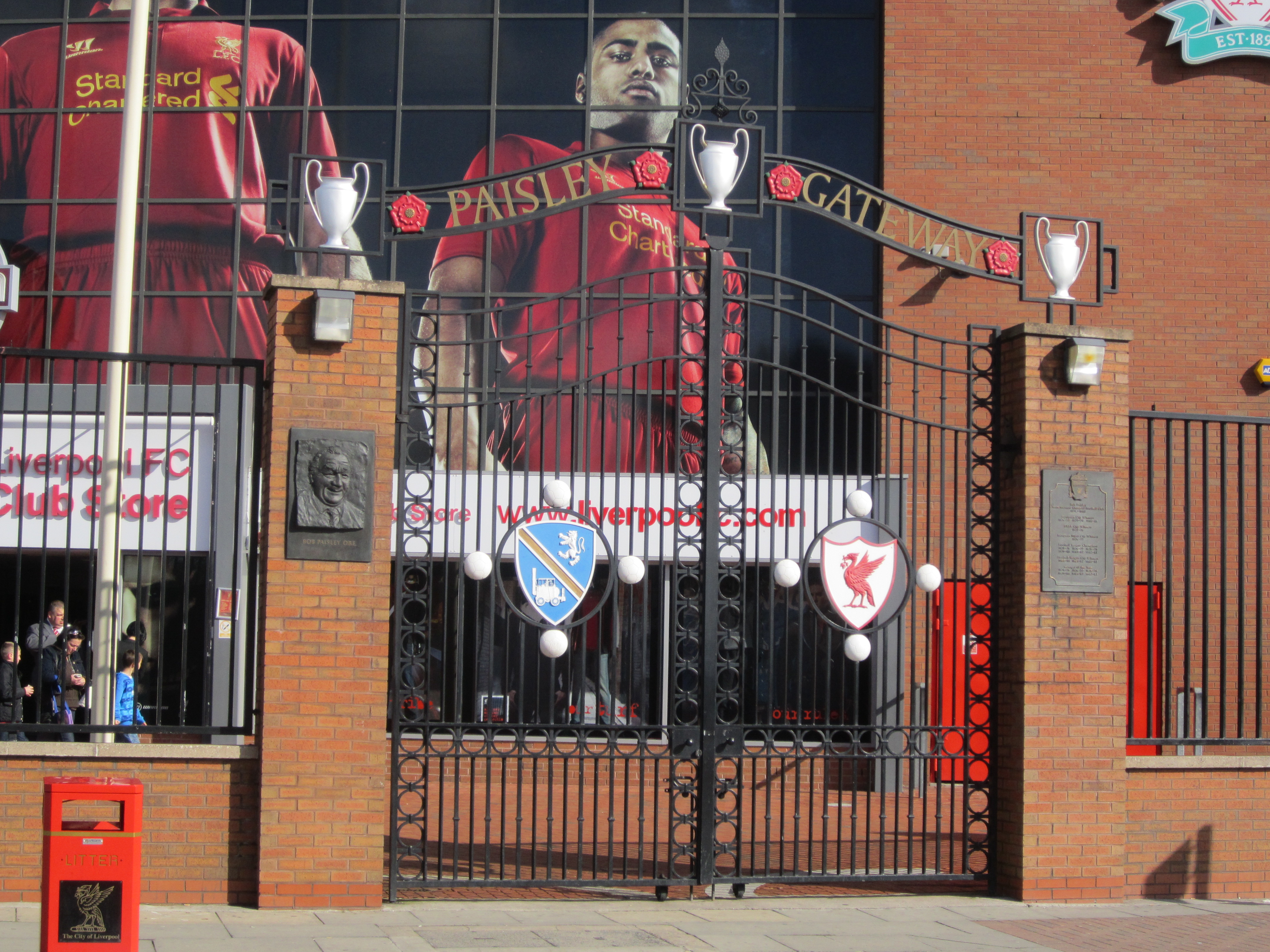
The Paisley Gateway was erected outside the Kop in 1999 in tribute to former manager Bob Paisley. It includes a depiction of the three European Cups he won during his tenure.

The Sir Kenny Dalglish Stand is two-tiered. Originally a single-tiered stand called the Kemlyn Road Stand, it was renamed the Centenary Stand in 1992, when a second tier was added to coincide with the club's centenary. It is located opposite the Main Stand and houses directors' boxes, which are between the two tiers. The stand also houses the ground's police station. On 3 May 2017, Liverpool announced the Centenary Stand would be renamed the Kenny Dalglish Stand in honour of the club's former player and manager Kenny Dalglish.

The Anfield Road stand, on the left side of the Main Stand, houses the away fans during matches. The Anfield Road End was rebuilt in 1965, and multi-coloured seats were added in 1982. Originally a single-tier stand, the stand was further revamped in 1998, adding a second tier and providing additional seating. The stand was extended again in 2024, with 7,000 seats added, bringing the total capacity of the ground above 60,000.

There are 59 spaces available in the stadium for wheelchair users with season tickets; a further 33 are available for general sale, and 8 are allocated to away supporters. These spaces are located in the Main Stand, Anfield Road Stand and The Kop. There are 38 spaces available for the visually impaired, which are situated in the old paddock area of the Main Stand, with space for one personal assistant each. A headset with full commentary is provided.

The stadium features tributes to two of the club's most successful managers. The Paisley Gateway is a tribute to Bob Paisley, who guided Liverpool to three European Cups and six League Championships in the 1970s and 1980s. The gates were erected at the Kop; their design includes representations of the three European Cups Paisley won during his tenure, the crest of his birthplace in Hetton-le-Hole, and the crest of Liverpool. The Shankly Gates, in tribute to Bill Shankly, Paisley's predecessor between 1959 and 1974, are at the Anfield Road end. Their design includes a Scottish flag, a Scottish thistle, the Liverpool badge, and the words "You'll Never Walk Alone".

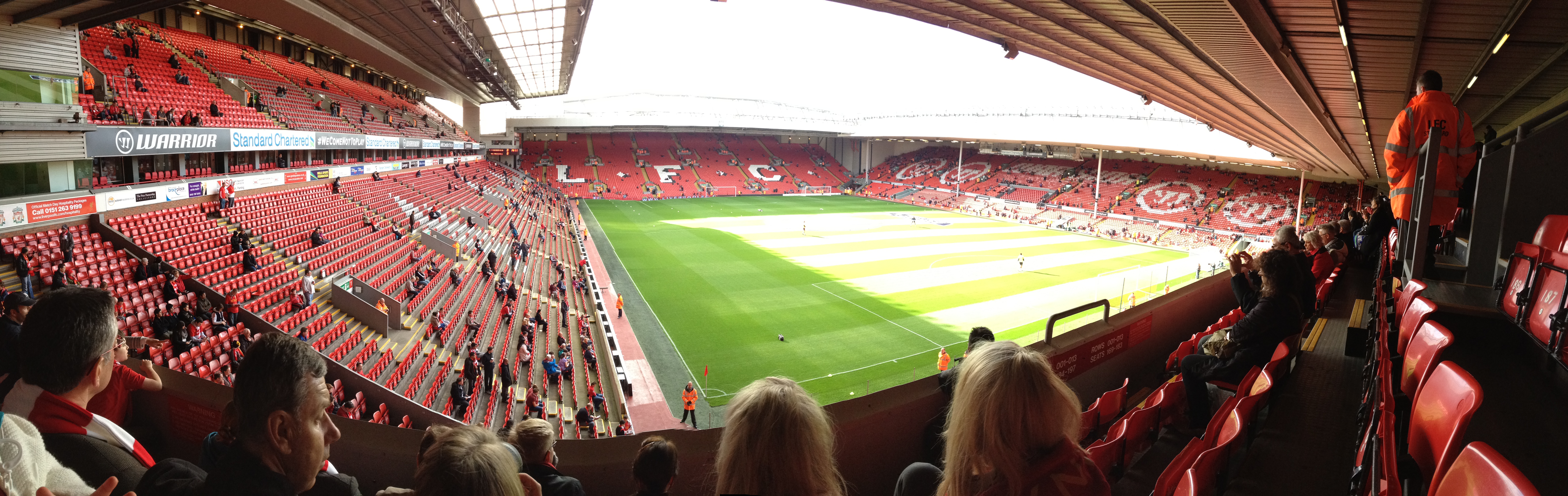
A panorama of Anfield from the Anfield Road Stand, showing from left to right the Sir Kenny Dalglish Stand, the Kop Stand and the former Main Stand in 2012

== Redevelopment ==
=== Abandoned new stadium plans ===
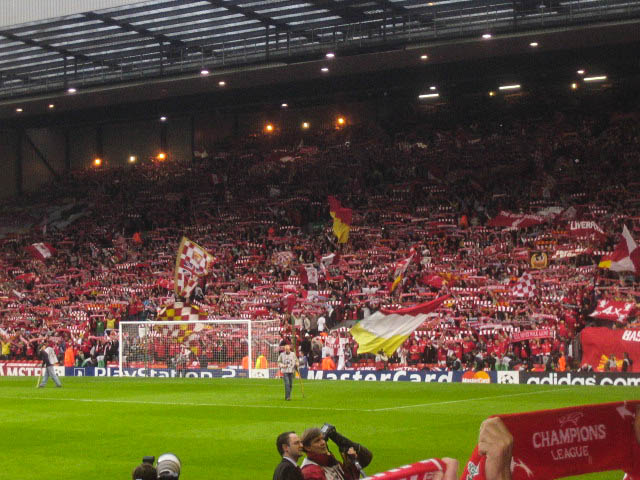
The Kop; the atmosphere generated by the crowd in the stand led owner John W. Henry to reconsider the construction of a new stadium.

Plans to replace Anfield were originally started by Liverpool in May 2002. The proposed capacity was 55,000, but it was later changed to 61,000, with 1,000 seats given for segregation between home and away fans. Several attempts were made between 2003 and 2007 by the Liverpool City Council to instigate a groundshare of the proposed stadium with local rivals Everton, but this move was rejected, as neither club favoured it. On 30 July 2004 Liverpool was granted planning permission to build a new stadium 300 yards (270 m) away from Anfield at Stanley Park. On 8 September 2006, Liverpool City Council agreed to grant the club a 999-year lease of the land on the proposed site.

Following the takeover of Liverpool on 6 February 2007 by George Gillett and Tom Hicks, the proposed stadium was redesigned. In November 2007, the redesigned layout was approved by the council, and construction was due to start in early 2008. The new stadium, provisionally called Stanley Park Stadium, was to be built by HKS. It was scheduled to open in August 2011 with a capacity of 60,000. If the new stadium had been built, Anfield would have been demolished. The land would have become home to the centrepiece for the Anfield Plaza development, which would have included a hotel, restaurants and offices. However, the construction of Stanley Park was delayed following the 2008 financial crisis and the Great Recession, which directly affected the then American owners. The situation was worsened because the club was bought with borrowed money, not the owners' capital, and interest rates were higher than expected. Hicks and Gillett promised to begin work on the stadium within 60 days of acquisition of the club, but had trouble financing the estimated £500 million needed for the Stanley Park development. The deadline passed and the plan was eventually cancelled by the Fenway Sports Group, as their preference was to re-develop Anfield.

=== Anfield redevelopment ===
The acquisition of Liverpool by Fenway Sports Group in October 2010 put into question whether Liverpool would leave Anfield. In February 2011, the new club owner, John W. Henry, stated he had a preference for staying at Anfield and expanding the capacity. After attending a number of games at Anfield, Henry stated that "the Kop is unrivalled", adding "it would be hard to replicate that feeling anywhere else". On 15 October 2012, Liverpool City Council announced plans to regenerate the Anfield area after securing a £25m grant, with a housing association also set to invest.

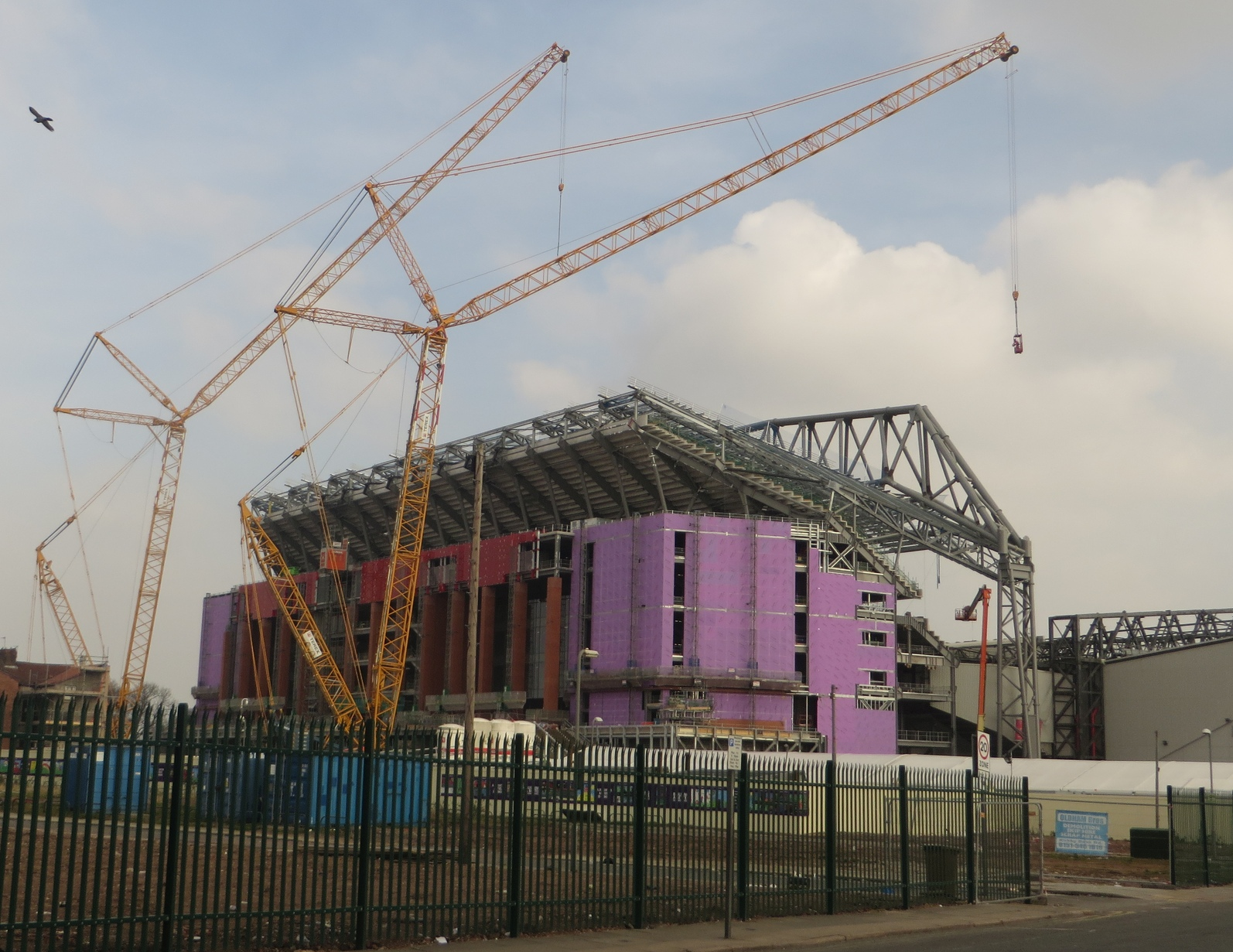
The Main Stand redevelopment in March 2016

Anfield was listed as an Asset of Community Value by Liverpool City Council on 23 August 2013. On 11 September, current owner John W. Henry announced that they had the funds to afford the expansion, but they were waiting for the City Council to finalise the purchase of houses in the area before they commit to plans to expand the Main Stand and the Anfield Road end of the ground. In April 2014, Liverpool signed a legal agreement with Liverpool City Council and Your Housing Group to redevelop the surrounding Anfield area. This was seen as a significant step towards the renovation of the stadium. The redevelopment was worth around £260 million.

==== Phase one (2015–16): Main Stand redevelopment ====
In April 2014, Liverpool revealed plans for an expansion of the Main Stand, which involved adding a new third tier, new matchday facilities and enhanced corporate facilities. The new stand would add 8,500 seats and take the capacity of the stadium to 54,742. Construction of the new Main Stand was made possible by the complete demolition of all the houses in Lothair Road as well as some of those on neighbouring Alroy Road and Anfield Road. Liverpool had started to purchase housing immediately surrounding Anfield in 2000. The houses were left empty, including at least 22 in the roads backing onto the main stand. Liverpool were accused of deliberately allowing the area to become blighted, thus depressing the property prices.

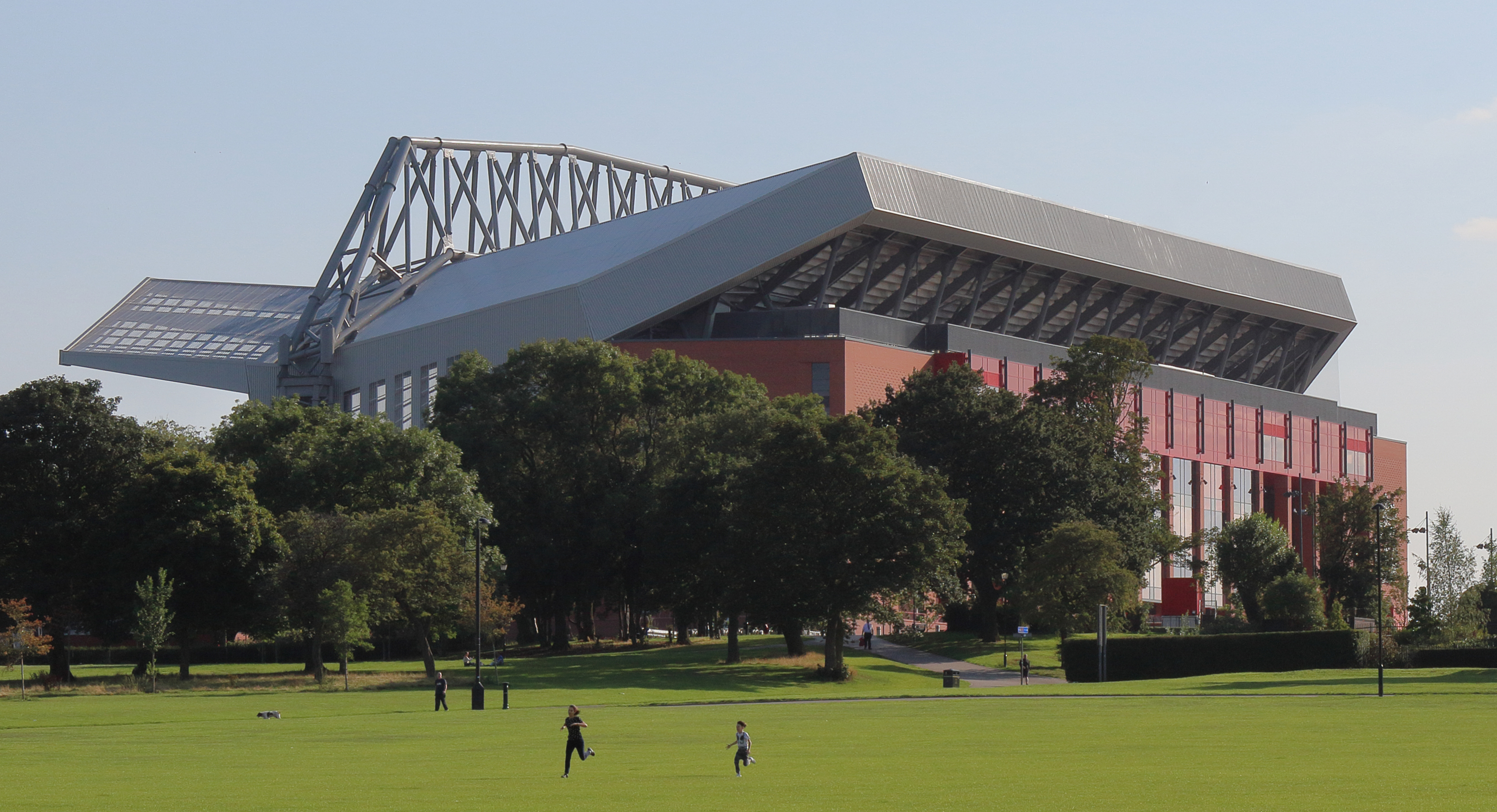
Exterior of the completed Main Stand (pictured from Stanley Park)

Work began on 8 December 2014, with the club aiming for the new stand to be match-ready and operational for the start of the 2016–17 season. The work was undertaken by Carillion. The structure of the new stand was constructed around the existing main stand to enable the existing stand to continue to be used at full operational capacity during the 2015–16 season. Demolition of the existing stand took place in summer 2016, allowing for the construction of the lower tiers of the new stand during the off-season. Consisting of 1.8 million bricks and blocks and over 5000 tonnes of steel, the stand was opened on schedule on 9 September 2016 for the first home game of the 2016–17 season, a 4–1 victory over Leicester City. Further internal construction work, including new changing rooms and media facilities, continued until April 2017.

==== New club superstore and matchday experience enhancements (2016–17) ====
Outline planning permission was granted by Liverpool council for the construction of a new 1,800 sq m club superstore development, situated on Walton Breck Road on the corner of the Kop and the new Main Stand in May 2016. Construction began in December 2016, with the store opening early in the 2017–18 season. The space between the new store and the stadium was developed into a "fan zone", with new catering outlets and pre-match entertainment.

==== Phase two (2021–2024): Anfield Road End redevelopment ====
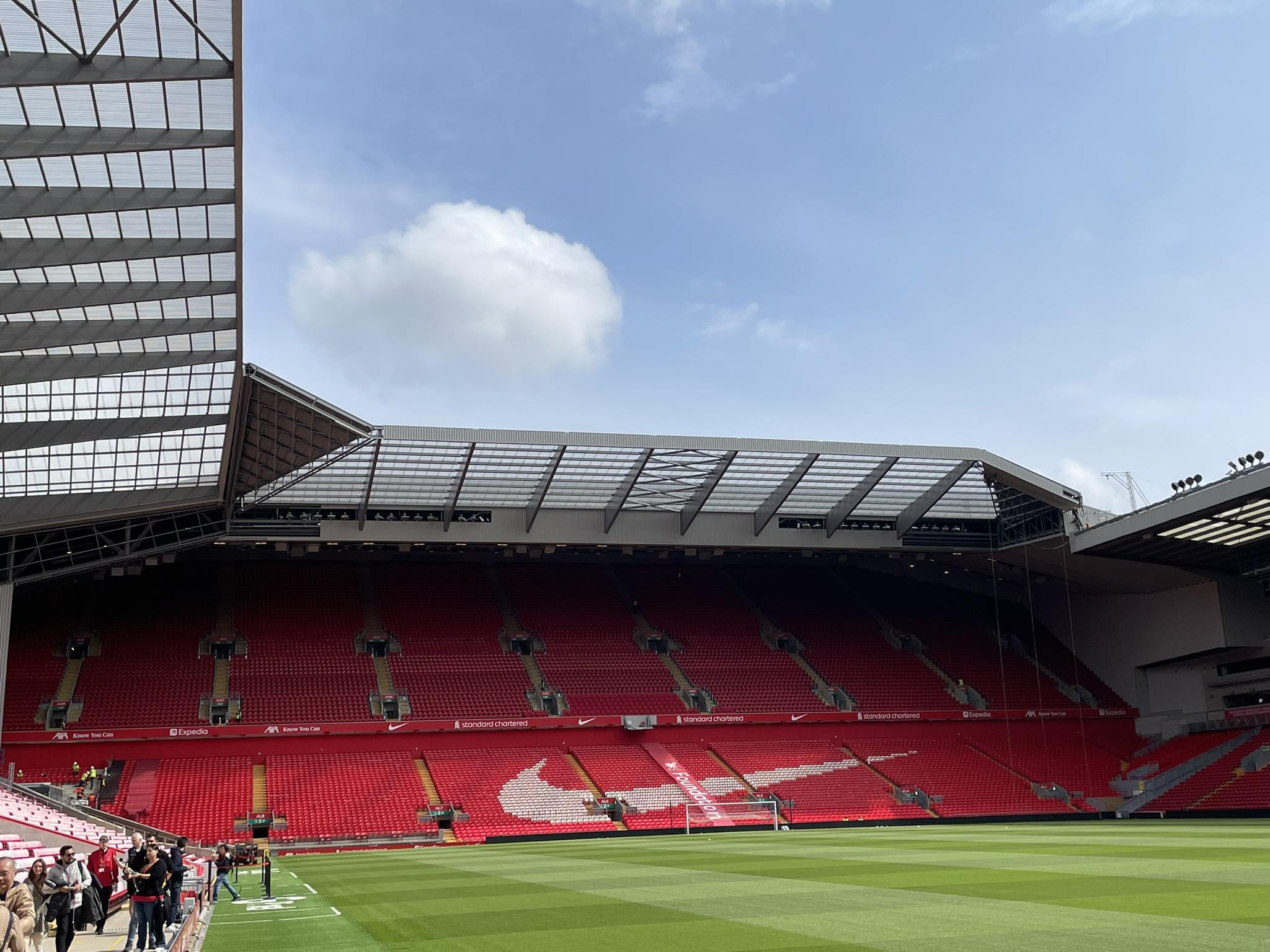
The redeveloped Anfield Road End nearing completion in May 2024

The second phase of Anfield's redevelopment was to redevelop the Anfield Road stand. The club received initial outline planning permission in 2014 for the redevelopment, with seating to be increased by 4,825, giving Anfield a total capacity of 58,000. However, in August 2019, Liverpool allowed the planning permission associated with the original 2014 designs to lapse, confirming their intention to submit "ambitious new plans" for the Anfield Road End redevelopment which are believed to increase the capacity further to take the overall capacity of Anfield above 60,000. The redevelopment focused on the upper tier of the stand, with the lower tier remaining unchanged. Construction work was completed behind the existing stand and then connected to the lower tier, which was expected to be in the 2022 off-season. Anfield's capacity was not expected to be affected throughout the duration of the works.

The club spent the second half of 2019 finalising plans and consulting local residents, planning officials and other stakeholders with a view to submitting the new plans for approval in early 2020. However, in March 2020, Liverpool delayed submitting a planning application for the project, in light of financial uncertainty caused by the COVID-19 pandemic. In December 2020, Liverpool announced that they would be moving forward with the project by submitting final planning application for the redevelopment, with the delay pushing back the initial completion date for Phase Two redevelopment from summer 2022 to summer 2023 at the earliest. The plans were approved by the Liverpool City Council in June 2021. The expansion was expected to cost £60 million and allowed Anfield Road stand to seat 7,000 more people, giving the stadium a total capacity of 61,000.

Work by contractor Buckingham Group commenced on 30 September 2021, with the first sod being turned by manager Jürgen Klopp. The stand was expected to be completed during the 2023–24 season and would also see the relocation of the Family Park to a covered position. However, on 17 August 2023, Buckingham announced it would be filing for administration, jeopardising the timely completion of the new £80 million stand. On 7 September 2023, the club took control of the project, appointing Rayner Rowen Construction to complete the stand using as many of the original subcontractors as possible. In October 2023, Liverpool announced that the upper part of the new developed stand would not be open to the public "until the end of 2023". On 23 November, the club anticipated half of the new upper tier would be available for a Premier League match against Manchester United on 17 December 2023. Much of the stand opened for Liverpool's home Premier League game against Burnley on 10 February 2024.

== Other uses ==
=== International football and Liverpool Women ===
Anfield has hosted numerous international matches, and was one of the venues used during UEFA Euro 1996; the ground hosted three group games and a quarter-final. The first international match hosted at Anfield was between England and Ireland, in 1889. England won the match 6–1. Anfield was also the home venue for several of England's international football matches in the early 1900s, and for the Welsh national team in the later part of that century. Anfield has also played host to five FA Cup semi-finals, the last of which was in 1929. The most recent international to be hosted at Anfield was England's 2–1 victory over Uruguay on 1 March 2006. The close proximity of the stands to the pitch prevents the club from extending the pitch to meet UEFA's required length, 105m by 68m (114 yards by 74). The pitch at Anfield is 101 metres (110 yd). Since 2006, the stadium has been ineligible to host England games, Champions League and Europa League finals, and UEFA tournaments (UEFA Euro 2028).

On 14 February 1921, Scouse comedian Harry Weldon invited Dick, Kerr Ladies F.C. to Anfield to compete in a match between themselves and a side made up of the best players from the rest of Britain, for The Harry Weldon Cup in aid of unemployed ex-servicemen. Weldon's side was made up of the best individual players from teams throughout the UK, with one player travelling from the island of Unst in the Shetland Isles. 25,000 fans were in attendance that day as Dick, Kerr Ladies went on to win 9–1. The trophy is now on display at the National Football Museum in Manchester.

England has played two testimonial matches against Liverpool at Anfield. The first was in 1983, when England faced Liverpool for Phil Thompson's testimonial. Then, in 1988, England visited again for Alan Hansen's testimonial. Liverpool's arch rival Manchester United played their first home game of the 1971–72 season at Anfield as they were banned from playing their first two home league matches at Old Trafford after an incident of hooliganism. United beat Arsenal 3–1.

In November 2019, Anfield hosted a Women's Super League fixture for the first time, with the 6th matchday of the 2019–20 season featuring the Merseyside Derby between Liverpool Women and local rivals Everton Women. On 25 September 2022, Anfield played host to second Merseyside Derby between two women's first teams in the Women's Super League. Played before a record attendance of 27,574 for a Liverpool game for their women's first team, it was also the first women's Merseyside Derby to be televised. This attendance was the 7th highest of the 2022–23 season. The women's team won at Anfield for the first time on 14 March 2025, beating Manchester United 3–1.

=== Rugby league ===
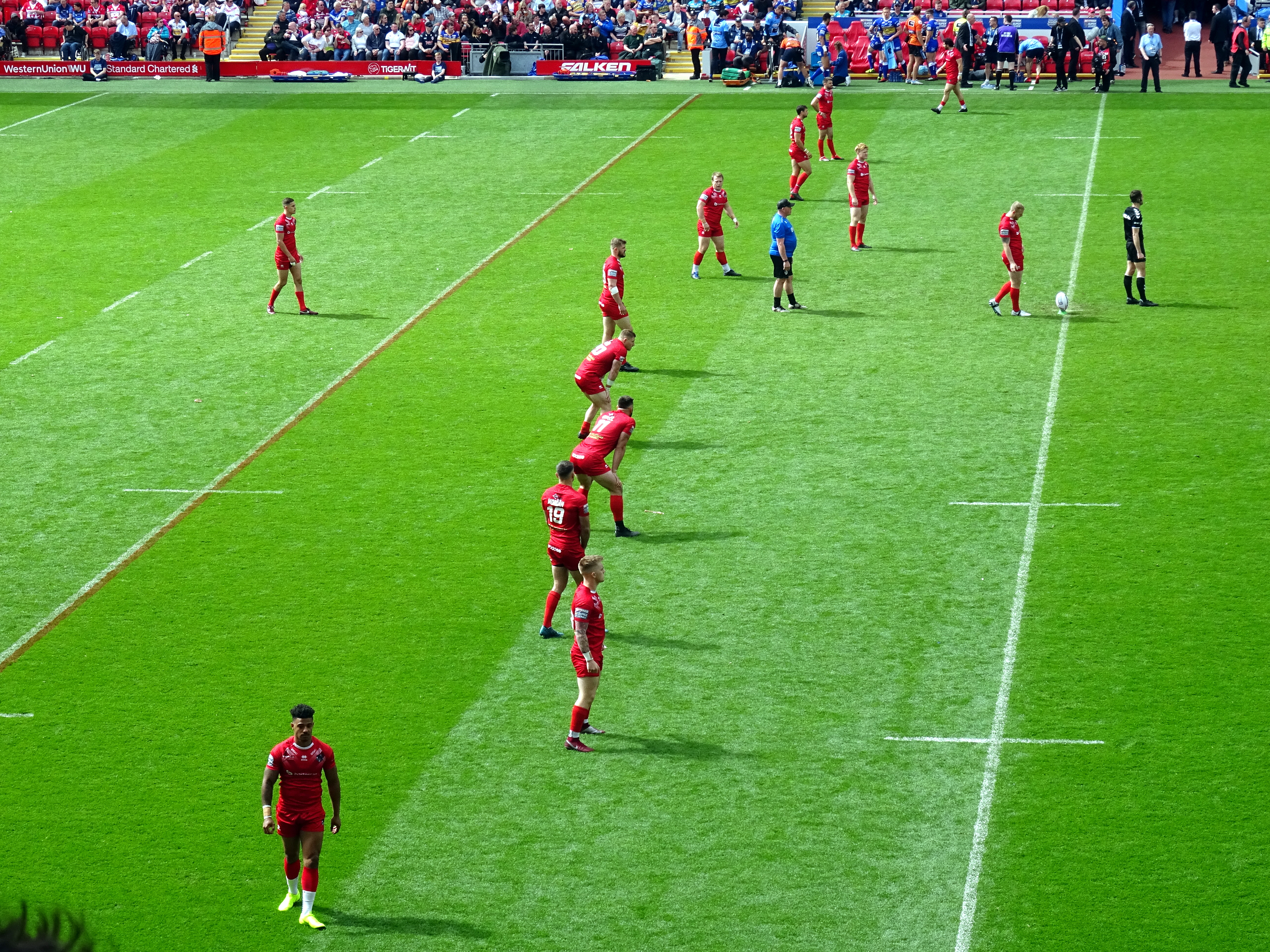
London Broncos kicking off at Anfield during Magic Weekend 2019

The stadium has hosted five rugby league matches: the 1989 Charity Shield between Widnes and Wigan, the 1991 World Club Challenge between Wigan, winners of the RFL Championship, and Penrith Panthers, winners of the Australian NSWRL Premiership, with an attendance of 20,152; a 1997 St. Helens Super League home game against Castleford Tigers, with an attendance of 12,329; and the 2016 Rugby League Four Nations Final, in front of 40,042 people.

Anfield was chosen as the venue for the 2019 Magic Weekend after two test matches were played there in 2016 and 2018. After previously choosing games that were local derbies or competitive games, in 2019, the fixtures were determined by the previous season's league position.

=== Other sports ===
Anfield has been the venue for many other events. During the mid-twenties, Anfield was the finishing line for the city marathon. Liverpool held an annual race that started from St George's Plateau in the city centre and finished with a lap of Anfield. Boxing matches were regularly held at Anfield during the inter-war years, including several British boxing championships; on 12 June 1934, Nel Tarleton beat Freddie Miller for the World Featherweight title. Professional tennis was played at Anfield on boards on the pitch. US Open champion, Bill Tilden, and Wimbledon champion, Fred Perry, entertained the crowds in an exhibition match. In 1958, an exhibition basketball match featuring the Harlem Globetrotters was held at the ground.

=== Non sporting events ===
Aside from sporting uses, Anfield has been a venue for musicians of different genres as well as evangelical preachers. One week in July 1984, the American evangelist Billy Graham preached at Anfield, attracting crowds of over 30,000 each night. Anfield was featured in Liverpool's 2008 European Capital of Culture celebrations: 36,000 people attended a concert on 1 June 2008, featuring the Zutons, Kaiser Chiefs and Paul McCartney. Live concerts made a return to Anfield in the summer of 2019, with Take That, Bon Jovi and Pink performing. Take That lead singer Gary Barlow, a Liverpool fan, brought out a guest vocalist, Gerry Marsden, and they sang the club's anthem "You'll Never Walk Alone". Artists who played at the stadium in summer 2022 include Elton John, the Rolling Stones and the Eagles. Taylor Swift played three consecutive dates at Anfield, featuring Paramore as special guests, in June 2024 as part of her Eras Tour. Dua Lipa, Lana Del Rey and Bruce Springsteen performed at the stadium in 2025.

== Records ==
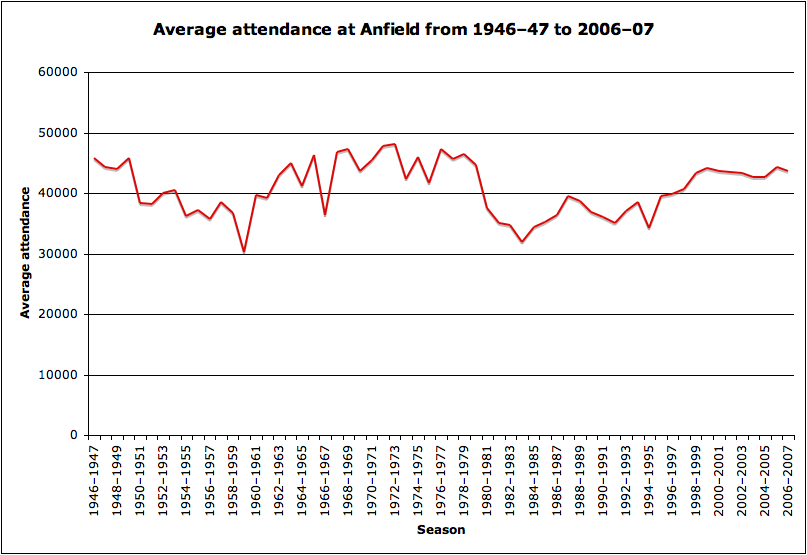
The average attendance at Anfield from 1946 to 2007

The highest sporting attendance recorded at Anfield is 61,905, for Liverpool's match against Wolverhampton Wanderers in the FA Cup fifth round, on 2 February 1952. Liverpool's record league attendance is 60,466 against Wolverhampton Wanderers on 27 December 2025. The highest non-sporting attendance at Anfield was recorded during a Taylor Swift concert in June 2024, with over 62,000 in attendance. The lowest attendance recorded at Anfield was 1,000 for a match against Loughborough on 7 December 1895. The highest average attendance of 53,112 was set for the 2016–17 season.

Liverpool did not lose a league match at Anfield during the 1893–94, 1970–71, 1976–77, 1978–79, 1979–80, 1987–88, 2008–09, 2017–18, 2018–19, 2019–20 and 2021–22 seasons. Liverpool's longest unbeaten streak at home extended from January 1978 to January 1981, a period encompassing 85 games, in which Liverpool scored 212 goals and conceded 35. The club's longest unbeaten home run in the league is 68 games, which occurred from April 2017 to January 2021. Liverpool's worst losing streak at Anfield is six games in 2020–2021 with games played behind closed doors during the COVID-19 pandemic. The most consecutive league wins at Anfield is 24, this is the longest run in English top-flight history. It was accomplished across the 2018–19 and 2019–20 seasons.

== Transport ==
The stadium is about 2 miles (3 km) from Lime Street Station, which lies on a branch of the West Coast Main Line from London Euston. Kirkdale Station, about 1 mile (1.6 km) from the stadium, is the nearest station to Anfield. Fans travelling by train for matches may book direct to Anfield, changing to the Peoplesbus Soccerbus service at Sandhills Station on the Merseyrail Northern Line. The stadium has no parking facilities for supporters. The streets around the ground allow parking only for residents with permits, although there are a small number of passes that can be allocated to over-65s. There are proposals under consideration for reinstating passenger traffic on the Bootle Branch, which would cut the distance from the nearest railway station to about 0.5 miles (1 km).

== See also ==
- The Liverpool Sound
- Lists of stadiums

== Bibliography ==
- Adams, Duncan (2007). A Fan's Guide to Football Grounds: England and Wales. Hersham: Ian Allan. ISBN 978-0-7110-3268-2. Archived from the original on 20 November 2008.
- Graham, Matthew (1984). Liverpool. Twickenham: Hamlyn Publishing. ISBN 0-600-50254-6.
- Inglis, Simon (1983). The Football Grounds of England and Wales. Beverley: Willow. ISBN 0-00-218024-3.
- Kelly, Stephen F. (1988). You'll Never Walk Alone. London: Queen Anne Press. ISBN 0-356-19594-5.
- Liversedge, Stan (1991). Liverpool The Official Centenary History. London: Hamlyn Publishing. ISBN 0-600-57308-7.
- Moynihan, Leo (2008). The Liverpool Miscellany. London: Vision Sports Publishing. ISBN 978-1-905326-46-4.
- Smith, Tommy (2008). Anfield Iron. London: Bantam Press. ISBN 978-0-593-05958-6.
