= ITunes Live: London Festival '08 =

iTunes Live: London Festival '08 may refer to:

- The 2008 iTunes Festival
- iTunes Live: London Festival '08 (Elliot Minor EP), 2008
- iTunes Live: London Festival '08 (Feeder EP), 2008
- iTunes Live: London Festival '08 (Gemma Hayes EP)
- iTunes Live: London Festival '08 (The Zutons EP), 2008
