= Devil's Deal =

Single by The Zutons
- B-side: "Six Foot Man", "Zutonkhamuun"
- Released: September 2002
- Genre: Indie
- Songwriters: Boyan Chowdhury, Dave McCabe, Sean Payne, Russell Pritchard

The Zutons singles chronology
"Devil's Deal" (2002)	"Creepin' and A Crawlin'" (2003)

"Devil's Deal" is the debut single by English rock band the Zutons, released in September 2002. One of its B-sides, "Zutonkhamuun", was later a B-side of the single "Pressure Point" as an alternate extended version.

== Track listing ==
1. "Devil's Deal"
2. "Six Foot Man"
3. "Zutonkhamuun"
