= Remember Me (The Zutons song) =

Single by The Zutons

from the album Who Killed...... The Zutons?
- B-side: "Have I Lost You", "Havana Gang Brawl (Demo)", "Long Time Coming (Live)", "Zuton Fever" (Live)
- Released: 21 June 2004
- Genre: Indie rock
- Songwriter(s): Boyan Chowdhury, Abi Harding, Dave McCabe, Sean Payne, Russell Pritchard

The Zutons singles chronology
"You Will You Won't" (2004)	"Remember Me" (2004)	"Don't Ever Think (Too Much)" (2004)

Remember Me (often incorrectly called Gotta' Keep The Feeling In) is the Zutons' third single released from their 2004 debut album Who Killed...... The Zutons?. The song peaked at number 39 in the UK in 2004.

== Song meaning ==
The song's meaning is about the singer's relationship with a friend who is spending too much time with their girlfriend instead. He sings about how he wants him back and to leave her and become good friends again.

== Track listing ==
=== CD version 1 ===
1. Remember Me
2. Have I Lost You?
3. Havana Gang Brawl (Demo)
4. Remember Me (Video)

=== CD version 2 ===
1. Remember Me
2. Long Time Coming (Live)

=== 7" version ===
1. Remember Me
2. Zuton Fever (Live)

== Other appearances ==
- Acoustic 05 (2005, Echo)

== Charts ==
Chart (2004)	Peak position
UK Singles (OCC)	39
