= Don't Ever Think (Too Much) =

Single by The Zutons

from the album Who Killed...... The Zutons?
- B-side: "Creepin' And A Crawlin'", "Haunts Me", "Rumblin' Ramblin'"
- Released: 11 October 2004
- Genre: Indie
- Songwriter(s): Boyan Chowdhury, Abi Harding, Dave McCabe, Sean Payne, Russell Pritchard

The Zutons singles chronology
| "Remember Me" (2004) | "Don't Ever Think (Too Much)" (2004) | "Confusion" (2004) |

"Don't Ever Think (Too Much)" is an October 2004 single by The Zutons. It was later released on the reissue of Who Killed...... The Zutons?.

== Track listing ==
=== CD Version 1 ===
1. Don't Ever Think (Too Much)
2. Creepin' And A Crawlin'
3. Haunts Me
4. Don't Ever Think (Too Much) (Video)

=== CD Version 2 ===
1. Don't Ever Think (Too Much)
2. Rumblin' Ramblin'

=== 7" Version ===
1. Don't Ever Think (Too Much)
2. Creepin' And A Crawlin'

=== Charts ===
| Chart (2004) | Peak position |
|---|---|
| UK Singles Chart | 15 |
| Chart (2005) | Peak position |
| UK Singles Chart | 138 |
