= Confusion (The Zutons song) =

Single by The Zutons

from the album Who Killed...... The Zutons?
- B-side: "Jump Sturdy", "You Will You Won't"
- Released: 13 December 2004
- Genre: Indie
- Songwriter(s): Boyan Chowdhury, Abi Harding, Dave McCabe, Sean Payne, Russell Pritchard

The Zutons singles chronology
"Don't Ever Think (Too Much)" (2004)	"Confusion" (2004)	"Why Won't You Give Me Your Love?" (2006)

"Confusion" was the last single to be released from the Zutons' first album Who Killed...... The Zutons? (2004). It entered the UK Singles Chart at number 37.

The song was used in a UK advertisement for the Peugeot 307 car range during 2005.

== Music video ==
The video depicts the band performing in an abandoned bar while two wine glasses and a corkscrew, among other objects, dance to the song.

== Track listing ==
=== CD ===
1. "Confusion"
2. "Jump Sturdy"

=== 7" ===
1. "Confusion"
2. "You Will You Won't"
