= Always Right Behind You =

Single by The Zutons

from the album You Can Do Anything
- Released: 19 May 2008
- Studio: Sunset Sound Recorders
- Genre: Indie rock, blues rock
- Length: 3:35
- Label: Deltasonic
- Songwriters: Abi Harding, Dave McCabe, Sean Payne, Russell Pritchard

The Zutons singles chronology
"It's the Little Things We Do" (2006)	"Always Right Behind You" (2008)	"What's Your Problem" (2008)

"Always Right Behind You" is the lead single from the album You Can Do Anything by English rock band The Zutons. This is the band's 13th single. The track peaked as the band's ninth UK Top 40 single, peaking at #26 in the UK Singles Chart despite entering the chart at #28 via download sales alone the day before its physical release.

== Track listing ==
=== CD1 ===
1. "Always Right Behind You"
2. "That's the Cost"

=== CD2 ===
1. "Always Right Behind You"
2. "You've Got to Move"
3. "Valerie" (Dermot Session)
4. "Always Right Behind You" (Video)

=== 7" Version ===
1. "Always Right Behind You"
2. "Let's Work it Out"

== Music video ==
This music video is of the band performing in a room with a band in the background, swaying their instruments to the song.
