= Why Won't You Give Me Your Love? =

2006 single by the Zutons

Single by the Zutons

from the album Tired of Hanging Around
- B-side: "I Want You"; "Are We Friends Or Lovers?"; "What's My Heart For?"; "Love's Little Lies"
- Released: 3 April 2006
- Recorded: Autumn 2005
- Genre: Alternative rock
- Length: 3:22
- Label: Deltasonic
- Songwriters: Boyan Chowdhury; Abi Harding; Dave McCabe; Sean Payne; Russell Pritchard
- Producer: Stephen Street

The Zutons singles chronology
"Confusion" (2004)	"Why Won't You Give Me Your Love?" (2006)	"Valerie" (2006)

"Why Won't You Give Me Your Love?" is the lead single from English rock band the Zutons' second album, Tired of Hanging Around (2006). It was released on 3 April 2006 and became the band's first UK top-10 entry, peaking at number nine on the UK Singles Chart.

== Track listings ==
CD version 1

1. "Why Won't You Give Me Your Love?"
2. "I Want You"

CD version 2

1. "Why Won't You Give Me Your Love?"
2. "Are We Friends or Lovers?"
3. "What's My Heart For?"
4. "Why Won't You Give Me Your Love?" (Video)

7-inch vinyl

1. "Why Won't You Give Me Your Love?"
2. "Love's Little Lies"
