= You Will You Won't =

Single by The Zutons

from the album Who Killed...... The Zutons?
- B-side: "Nobody Loves Me", "Times of Trouble", "Nightmare (Part 1)"
- Released: 5 April 2004
- Genre: Indie rock
- Length: 2:54
- Label: Deltasonic
- Songwriters: Boyan Chowdhury, Abi Harding, Dave McCabe, Sean Payne, Russell Pritchard
- Producer: Ian Broudie

The Zutons singles chronology
| "Pressure Point" (2004) | "You Will You Won't" (2004) | "Remember Me" (2004) |

"You Will You Won't" is a single by The Zutons. It is the second single from their debut album Who Killed...... The Zutons?. The single peaked at #22 in the UK singles charts.

The song is distinguished by the strident, catchy refrain which happens to serve as its title. The video contains a sequence involving unusual lighting effects with decidedly comic results.

== Track listing ==
=== CD ===
1. "You Will You Won't"
2. "Nobody Loves Me"
3. "Times Of Trouble"
4. "You Will You Won't" (Video)

=== 7" ===
1. "You Will You Won't"
2. "Nightmare (Part 1)"
