= Pressure Point (song) =

Single by The Zutons

from the album Who Killed...... The Zutons?
- B-side: "Beggars & Choosers"
- Released: 19 January 2004
- Genre: Indie rock
- Songwriters: Boyan Chowdhury, Abi Harding, Dave McCabe, Sean Payne, Russell Pritchard

The Zutons singles chronology
"Haunts Me" (2003)	"Pressure Point" (2004)	"You Will You Won't" (2004)

"Pressure Point" is a song by The Zutons. It was the first single to be released from their debut album Who Killed...... The Zutons?. The single peaked at #19 on the UK Singles Chart in January 2004 and was the band's first chart appearance.

To date, "Pressure Point" is the band's only chart hit in the United States, peaking at number 29 on the Billboard Hot Modern Rock Tracks chart in 2005.

== Video ==
During the music video, a number of chaotic incidents occur around the musicians, including a hanging dress, a cat and its milk, the flow of the milk, and the billboard. At the end, the billboard collapses, making it look like the musicians are dead, but they still sing and tap their feet.

The music video was used in the PSP demo disk, the single was featured in several Levi's commercials in 2004 and 2005, and in the EA Sports video game MVP Baseball 2005.

== Track listing ==
=== CD Version ===
1. Pressure Point
2. Beggars And Choosers

=== Limited CD2 Version ===
1. Pressure Point
2. Over The Hill
3. Zuton Fever (Acoustic Version)
4. Pressure Point (Video)

=== 7" Version ===
1. Pressure Point
2. Zutonkhamuun (Extended Version)
