= The Zutons =

English indie rock band

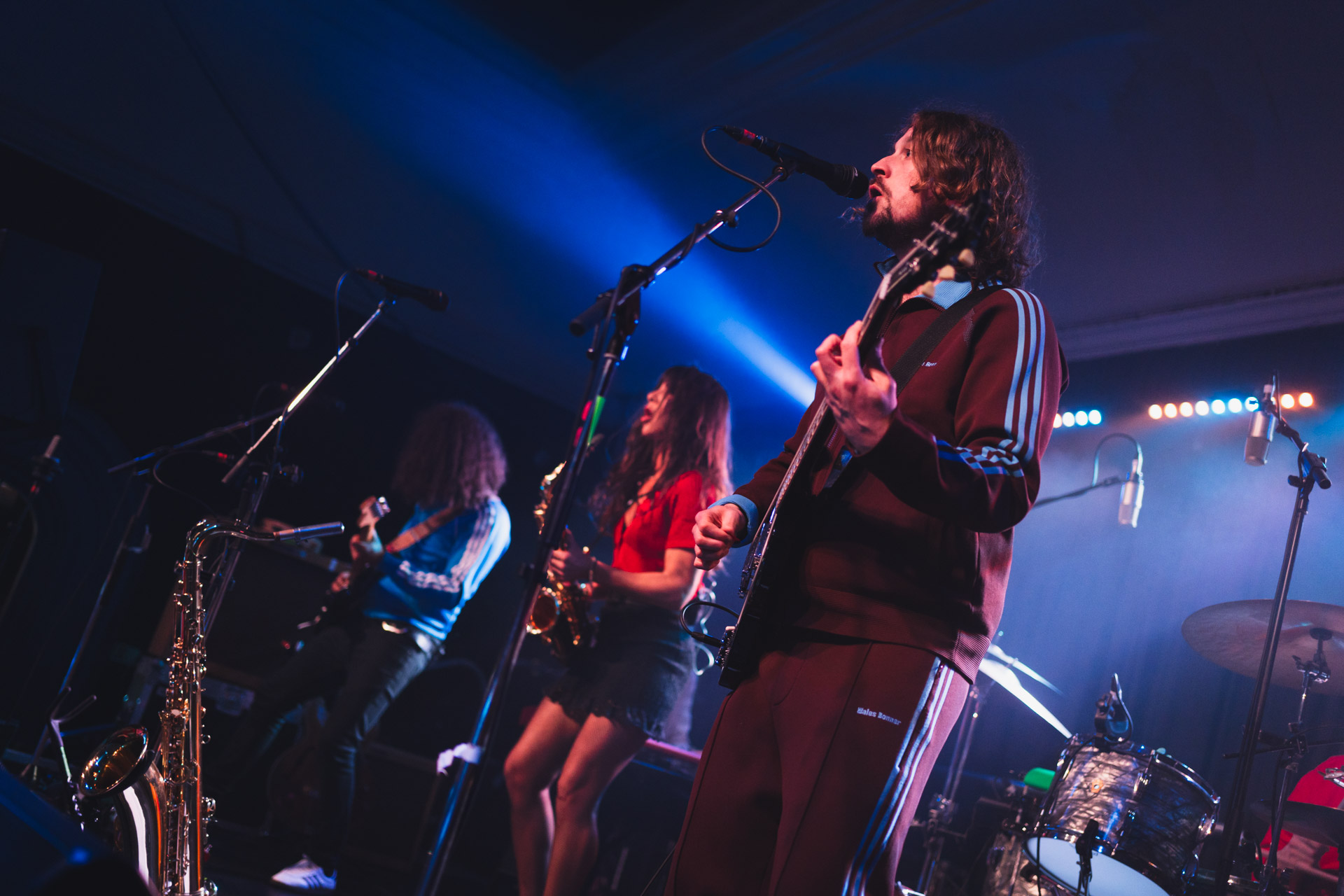
- The Zutons performing in 2024

Background information
- Origin: Liverpool, England
- Genre: Indie rock
- Years active: 2001–2009; 2016; 2018–present
- Label: Deltasonic/Sony
- Members: Dave McCabe; Abi Harding; Neil Bradley; Jay Lewis; Tim Cunningham
- Past members: Sean Payne; Russell Pritchard; Boyan Chowdhury; Paul Molloy
- Website: thezutons.com

The Zutons are an English indie rock band formed in Liverpool, in 2001. The band currently consists of Dave McCabe (vocals, guitar), Abi Harding (saxophone), Jay Lewis (guitar), Neil Bradley (keyboards) and Tim Cunningham (bass).

The band's debut album, Who Killed...... The Zutons?, was released in April 2004. With the release of their second studio album, Tired of Hanging Around (2006), the band achieved UK chart success with the singles, "Why Won't You Give Me Your Love?" and "Valerie", both of which reached number 9 on the UK Singles Chart.

Founding guitarist Boyan Chowdhury left the band in 2007 and was replaced by Paul Molloy for their third studio album, You Can Do Anything, which was released in June 2008. The band quietly disbanded the following year in 2009, and briefly reunited in 2016 for a one-off performance with Chowdhury, billed as "probably [their] last ever performance" in remembrance of their friend, actor and former Tramp Attack frontman Kristian Ealey.

In November 2018, the band announced a full reunion tour to commemorate and perform their debut album, with Jay Lewis of Cast and The La's replacing founding bass guitarist Russell Pritchard. Following the tour's completion, the band remained together, with Chowdhury eventually departing again in 2022.

After a sixteen-year gap between studio albums, the band released their fourth studio album, The Big Decider, in April 2024. The album was produced by Nile Rodgers, Ian Broudie of the Lightning Seeds, and drummer Sean Payne. It reached number seven on the UK Albums Chart. The following year, Payne departed from the band and was replaced by The Stairs drummer Paul Maguire on tour.

== History ==
=== Formation ===
The Zutons formed in Liverpool in 2001, taking their name from Captain Beefheart's Magic Band guitarist Zoot Horn Rollo. McCabe had previously been in the band Tramp Attack. Both Pritchard and Payne were members of Edgar Jones' post Stairs band The Big Kids (with Sean's brother Howie Payne of The Stands). The band was originally a four-piece, before Payne's girlfriend Abi Harding began joining The Zutons on stage for a couple of songs mid-set, playing simple saxophone lines. The other band members liked the way her saxophone enhanced their sound and Harding became a full member, contributing vocals and sax.

Deltasonic head Alan Wills was initially dubious about the musical talents of McCabe: "I'd heard other bands Jay had played in and I thought they were all rubbish". The Coral's James Skelly was persistent in trying to convince Wills of his friend's potential and the breakthrough finally came when the bedroom demos of the newly formed Zutons persuaded the Deltasonic head into working with them.

At first, the band had to battle comparisons to The Coral. Both bands were Merseyside bands prominent in the Liverpool music scene; were on the same record label; shared the same producer, Ian Broudie; and were good friends, with McCabe having previously written songs with James Skelly. The band's music has proved difficult to categorize, being described as "psychedelic cartoon punk". McCabe, who is also the lead songwriter, includes amongst his influences Talking Heads, Devo, Sly & the Family Stone, Dexys Midnight Runners, Sublime and Madness.

=== Early singles and Who Killed...... The Zutons? (2002–2005) ===
The first record the band put out was the 3-track CD Devil's Deal, released in September 2002. The following spring they released Creepin' and a Crawlin', and then the download-only single "Haunts Me" in November 2003. The band's "Z" logo was changed early in 2004 to avoid confusion with the Zenith logo.

The Zutons' debut album, Who Killed...... The Zutons?, was released in April 2004, and initially reached No. 13 in the UK album chart. However, after nearly a year, it moved up to No. 9 in early 2005. The LP had a specially printed 3-D cover and came with Zutons 3-D viewing glasses, which many fans then wore to their concerts. Early copies of the album also included a bonus 4-track CD of alternative versions of their songs. The album was critically acclaimed and was a nominee for the 2004 Mercury Music Prize. The band themselves were nominated for the British Breakthrough Act award at the 2005 BRIT Awards. The album was later re-issued following the single "Don't Ever Think (Too Much)", with that song being added as track 13. The track "Confusion" was used in a Peugeot 307 car advert in the UK during 2004-2005.

=== Tired of Hanging Around (2006–2007) ===
The new album Tired of Hanging Around was released on 17 April 2006 and reached No. 2 in the UK album charts. The first two singles from the album, "Why Won't You Give Me Your Love?" and "Valerie", both peaked at 9 in the UK charts, a fair achievement considering their highest place previously had been with the single "Don't Ever Think (Too Much)" at 15. The band toured the UK in May 2006 following the release of this album. They played at the Jersey Live Festival on 2 September 2006 before their second UK tour, which began in November 2006. In October 2006, they performed at The Secret Policeman's Ball. On New Year's Eve 2006, the Zutons appeared on Jools Holland's annual Hootenanny on BBC television, on which they performed their songs "Valerie", "Why Don't You Give Me Your Love?" and "It's The Little Things We Do."

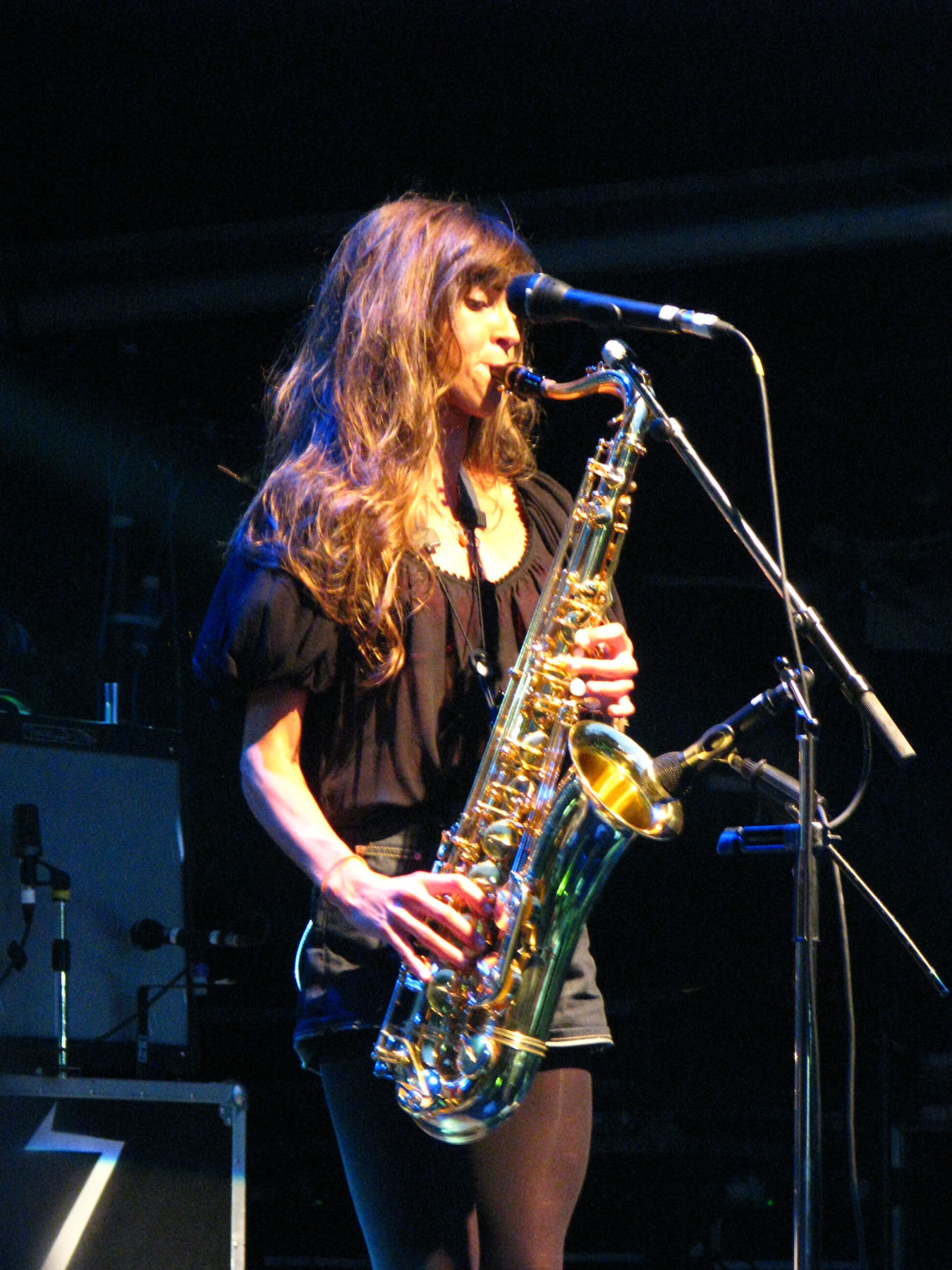
Abi Harding playing the saxophone in 2008

As the November tour began, the band gave an interview to STV discussing songwriting, making videos and their American dates with The Killers. In a separate interview, Payne complained about the tendency of music writers and magazines to generalise a particular city as the breeding ground of new 'movements', "A lot of bands get lumped in when they're in the same neck of the woods and journalists–especially in England–like to make a big deal out of that and make it into a scene, as if the individual bands aren't good enough to write about."

The band announced on 13 July 2007 that guitarist Boyan Chowdhury had left The Zutons, citing "musical differences". In late 2007, Paul Molloy, formerly of The Skylarks and The Stands, joined the band.

=== You Can Do Anything and split (2008–2009) ===
The band released their third studio album, titled You Can Do Anything, on 2 June 2008. It was the band's first album to feature Molloy on lead guitar. The first single was "Always Right Behind You", which was released on 26 May 2008. The album was recorded earlier in the year in Los Angeles, California. On 17 May 2008, The Zutons appeared on Soccer AM as guest stars. They performed "Always Right Behind You" at the end to celebrate the last show of the season. In the summer of 2008, The Zutons had their first UK tour in 2 years. They were scheduled to play seven gigs in forest settings as part of The Forestry Commission's Forest Tour.

On 26 July 2008, The Zutons performed at Japan's Fuji Rock Festival for a third time. On 30 August 2008, the band appeared at the indie festival Jersey Live, headlining the festival along with The Prodigy. Over the 2008 Christmas holidays, the Zutons were dropped from Sony/BMG. Following a run of 2009 festival performances including Summer Sundae in Leicester and Wickerman Festival, the band quietly disbanded.

Chowdhury formed a new band, the Venus Fury, shortly after his departure from The Zutons. In May 2013, he collaborated with musician David South and scriptwriter Michelle Langan to produce Shoebox, a musical theatre play set in 1950s Liverpool. In 2016, Harding became the keyboardist and saxophonist for The Lightning Seeds, the band of the Zutons' former producer Ian Broudie.

=== Reunion and The Big Decider (2016–present) ===
In April 2016, three members of the band, including original guitarist Chowdhury, performed at a tribute concert for the Warrington indie rock group Viola Beach, whose members had died earlier that year in a car accident in Sweden. On 23 June 2016, it was announced that the original line-up of the band would reform for a one-off gig at Mountford Hall, Liverpool, on 30 September 2016. A fundraiser in celebration of their friend, actor and former Tramp Attack frontman Kristian Ealey, who died earlier in the year. The show was billed as the band's "last ever". McCabe explained: "I'm not against doing gigs as The Zutons, it's the others who don't want to keep doing it, and I understand why. With two of them it's personal issues and Russ plays with Noel Gallagher." He also revealed that the band almost reformed in 2014 to mark the tenth anniversary of the band's debut album but that, "if The Zutons were ever to reform properly, I don't think it would be the original line-up".

In November 2018, the band announced a reunion tour to play Who Killed..... The Zutons? on its 15th anniversary. While original members, Boyan Chowdhury, Sean Payne and Abi Harding were all on board, Russell Pritchard confirmed via social media that he was not taking part in the reunion tour. In place of Pritchard, Cast member Jay Lewis was recruited to play bass.

On 27 July 2021, the band announced via their Twitter page that they were to support Nile Rodgers on one of the UK dates of his tour. They also confirmed that Rodgers would be producing the band's fourth studio album. On 24 October, they posted a photo with Rodgers at Abbey Road Studios while working on their fourth album. In November 2023, the band announced that their fourth studio album, The Big Decider, would be released on 26 April 2024. The new album announcement was accompanied by news that the band was to play a series of 22 UK gigs in smaller venues from late January to March 2024. Strong sales for these shows led to the tour being extended with 11 more UK appearances throughout April at larger venues.

On 20 March 2025, The Zutons announced via their Facebook page that Sean Payne had left the band, and would be replaced on tour by Paul Maguire, former drummer with the Stairs. Maguire had previously played with the Zutons in 2004 when Payne broke his fingers.

== Members ==
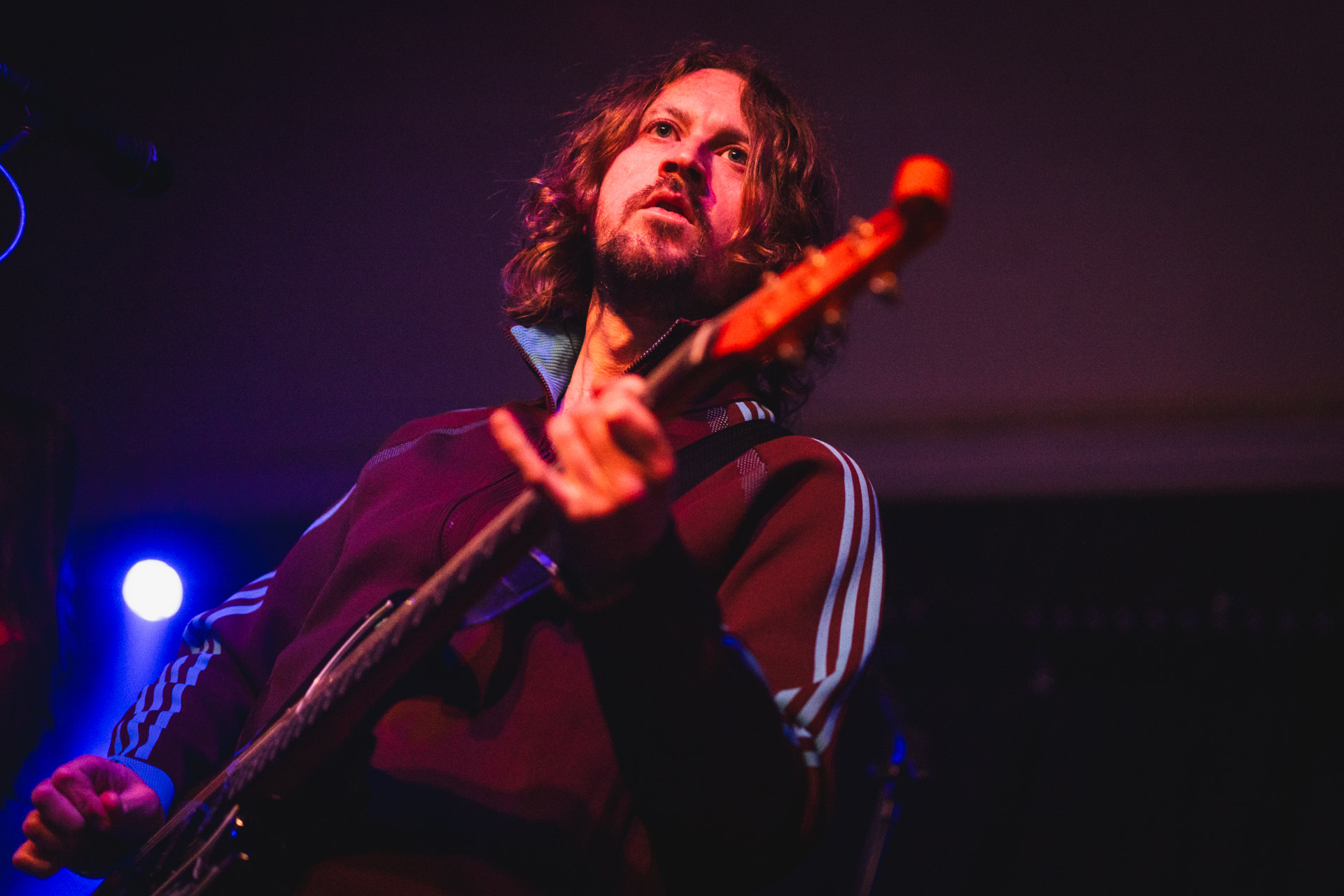
Dave McCabe

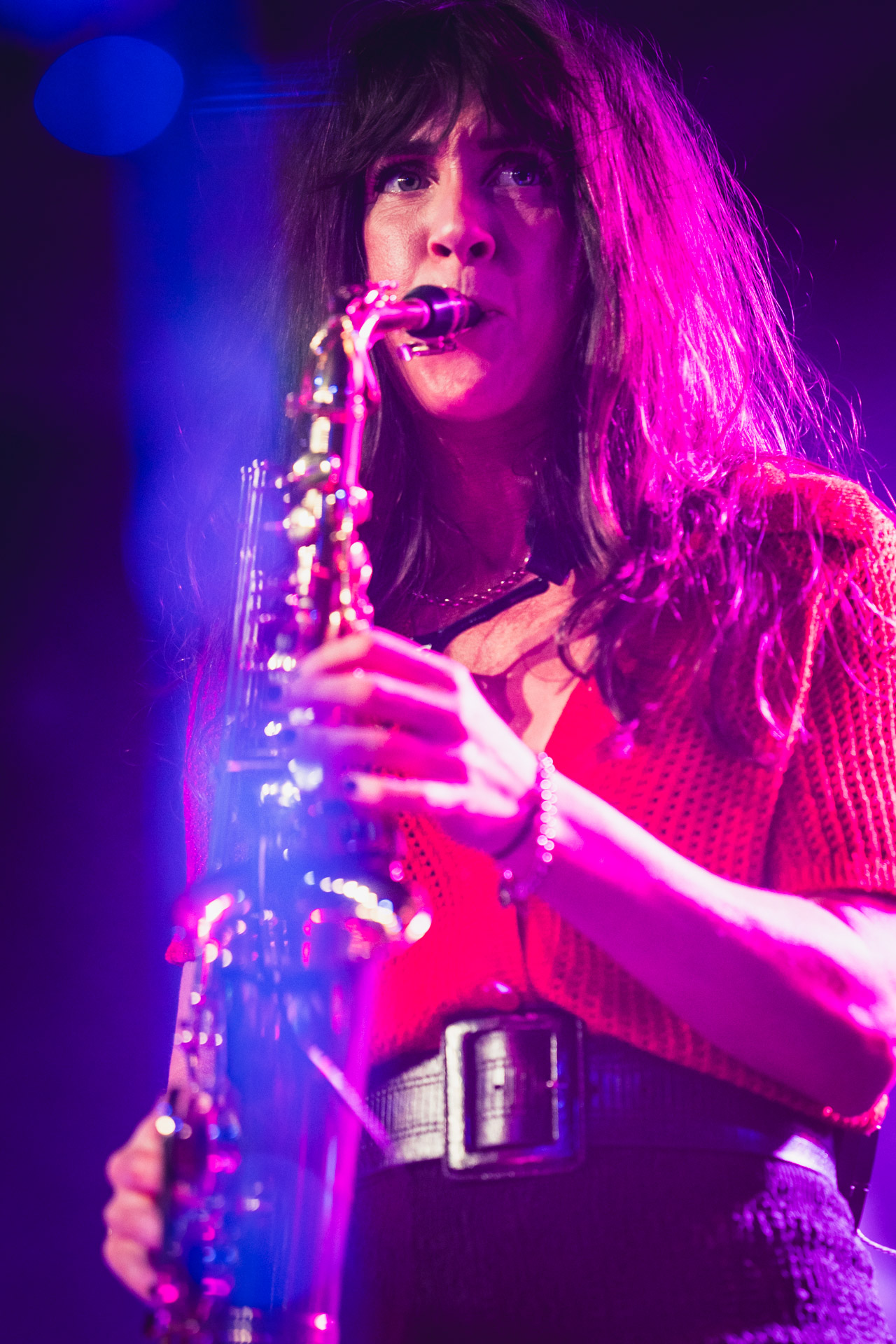
Abi Harding

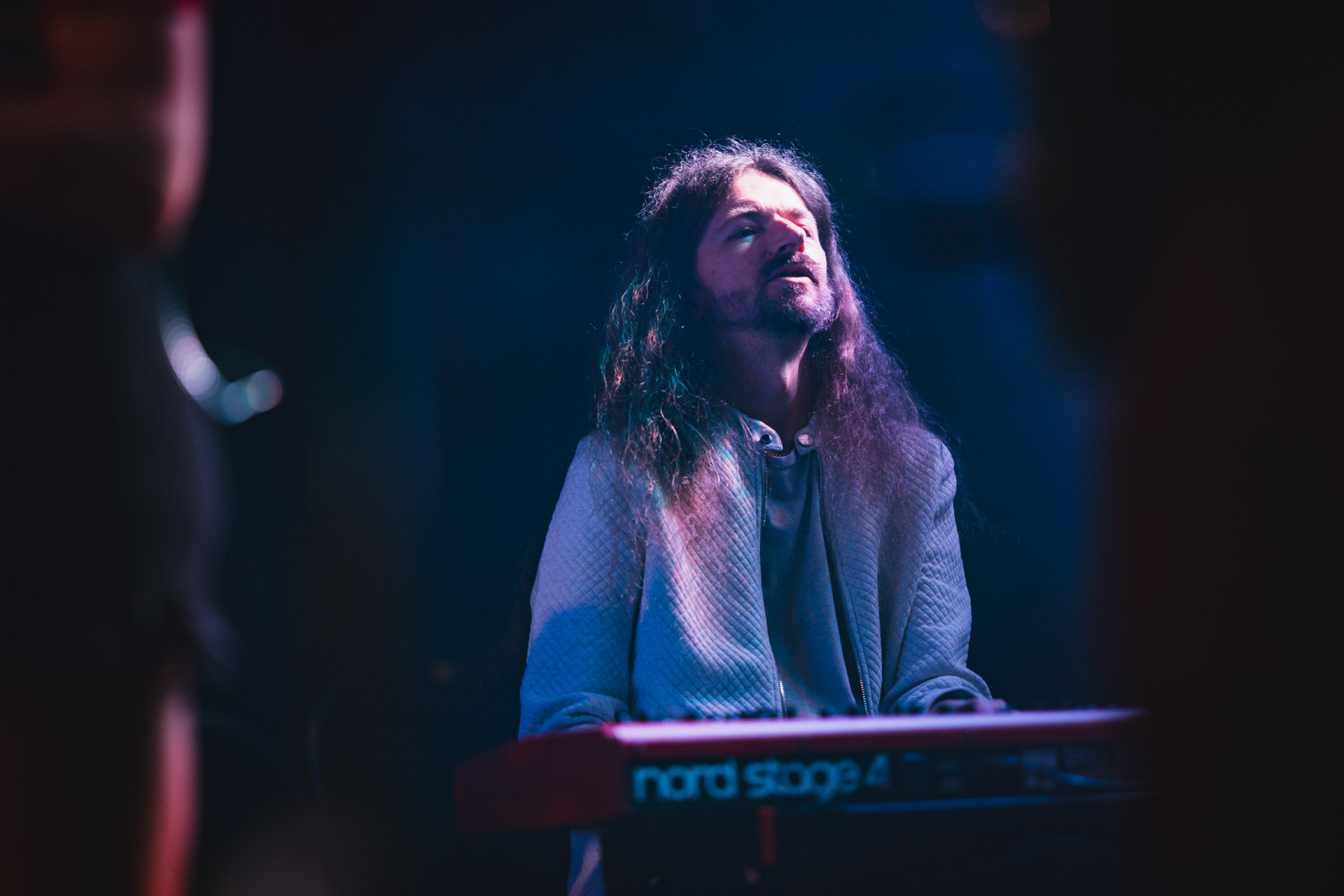
Neil Bradley

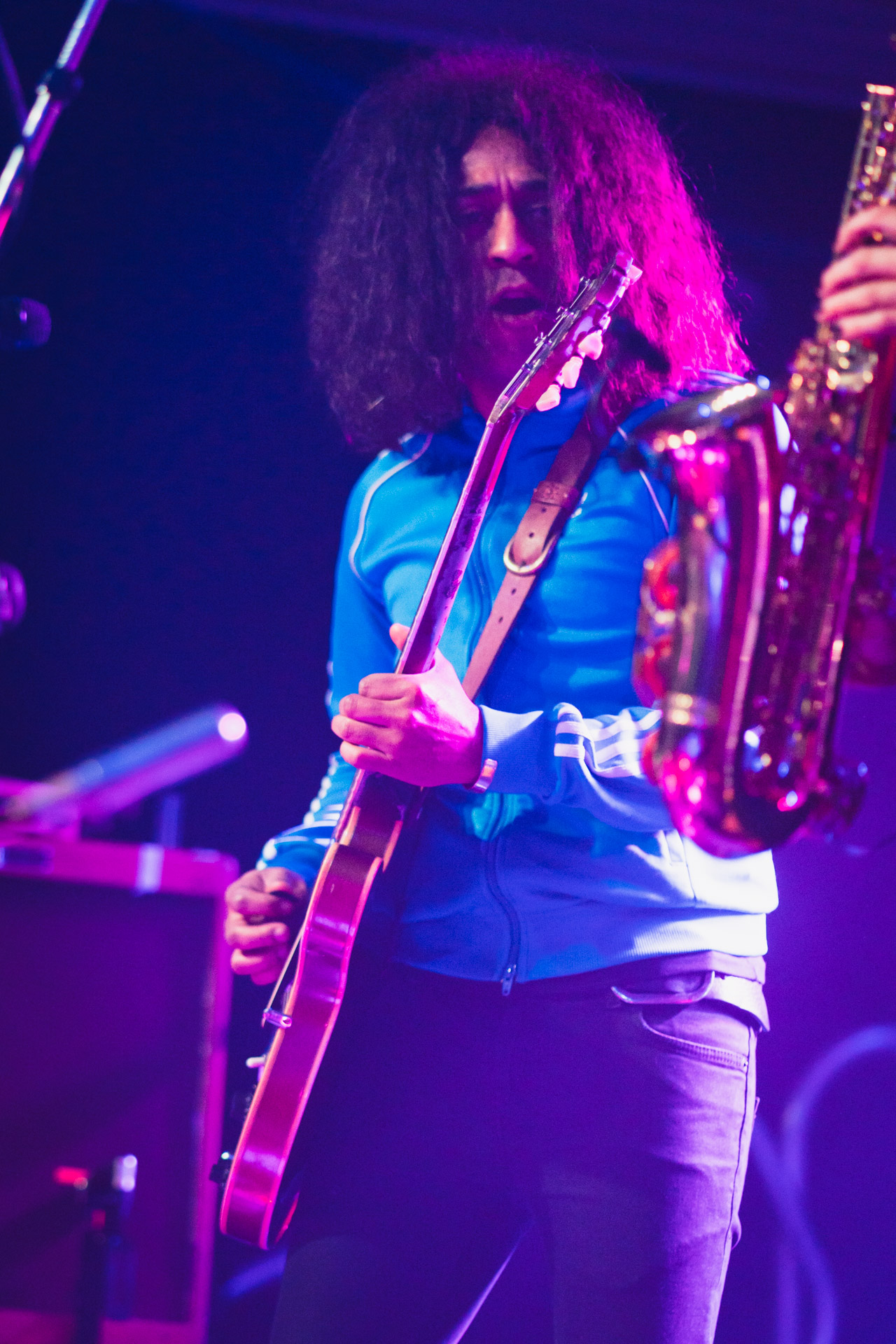
Jay Lewis

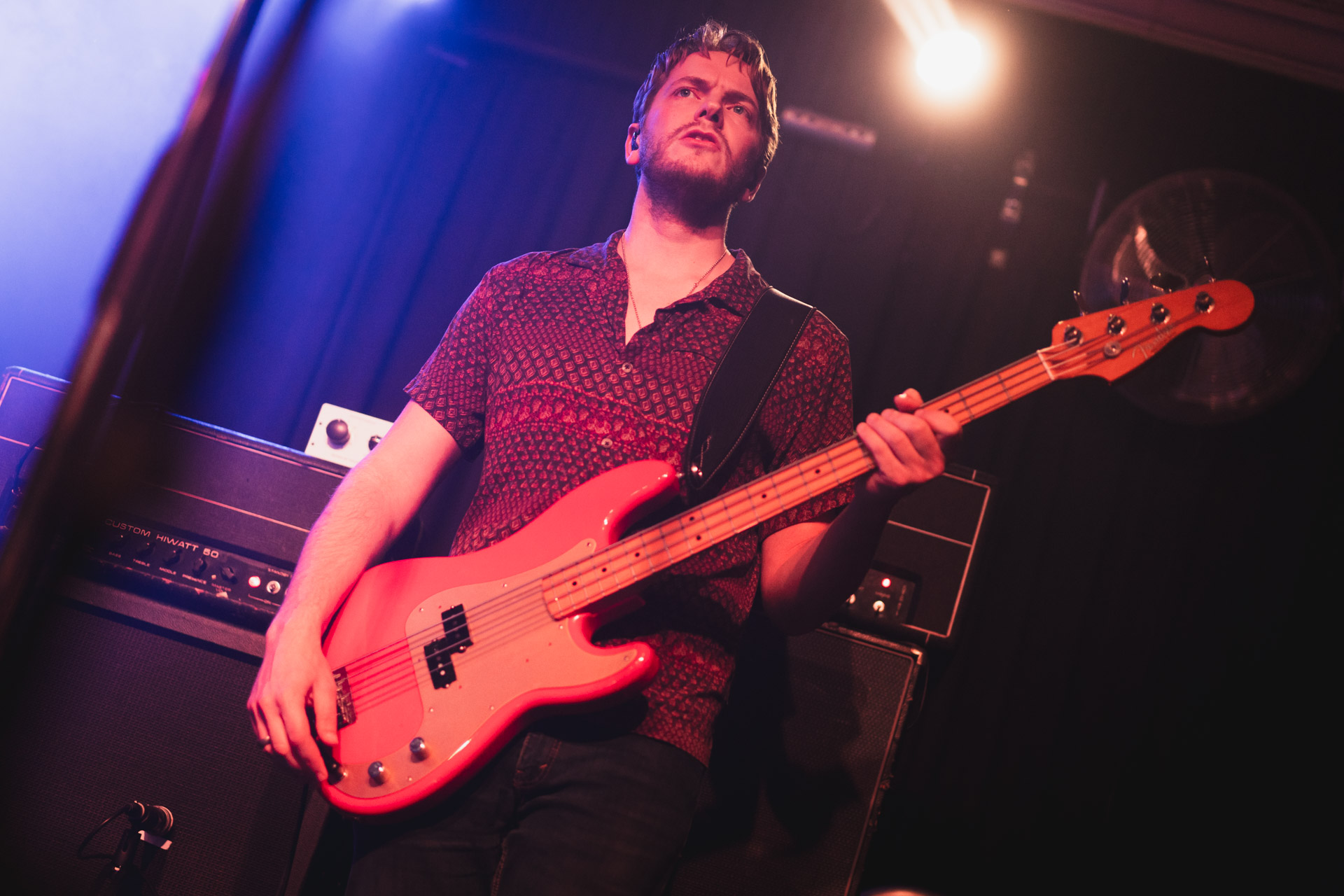
Tim Cunningham

Current members

- Dave McCabe – lead vocals, rhythm and acoustic guitar, piano (2001–2009, 2016, 2018–present)
- Abi Harding – saxophone, backing vocals (2001–2009, 2016, 2018–present)
- Neil Bradley – keyboards, percussion, backing vocals (2018–present)
- Jay Lewis – lead guitar, backing vocals (2022–present), bass (2018–2022)
- Tim Cunningham – bass (2022–present)
- Paul Maguire – drums (touring 2025–present; substitute 2004)

Former members

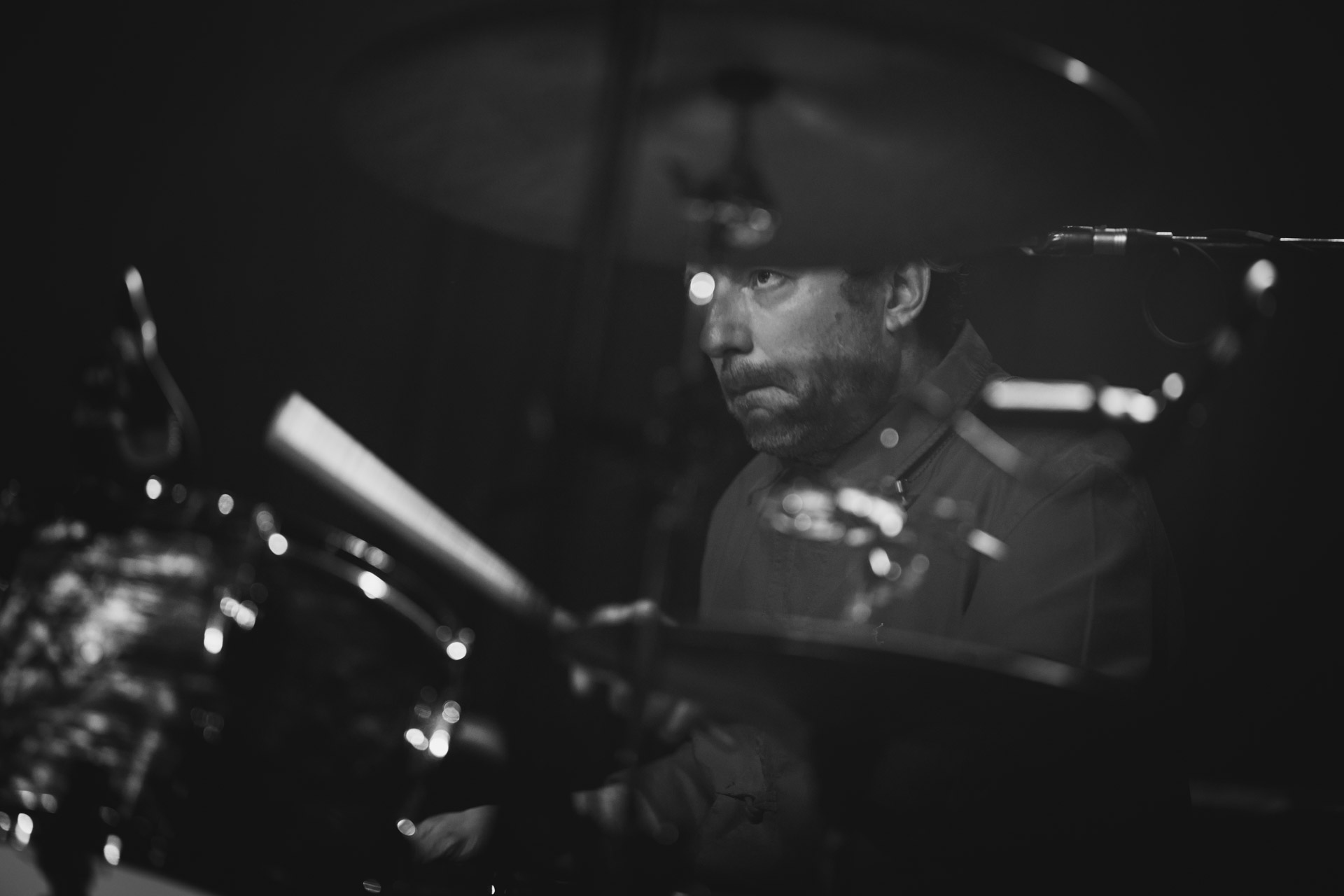
Former drummer Sean Payne
- Sean Payne – drums, percussion, backing vocals (2001–2009, 2016, 2018–2025), acoustic guitar, bass, additional keyboards (2024)
- Russell Pritchard – bass, backing vocals, acoustic guitar (2001–2009, 2016)
- Boyan Chowdhury – lead guitar, backing vocals (2001–2007, 2016, 2018–2022)
- Paul Molloy – lead guitar, piano, keyboards, backing vocals (2007–2009)

Timeline

== Discography ==
Studio albums

- Who Killed...... The Zutons? (2004)
- Tired of Hanging Around (2006)
- You Can Do Anything (2008)
- The Big Decider (2024)
