= Dave McCabe =

English musician (born 1981)

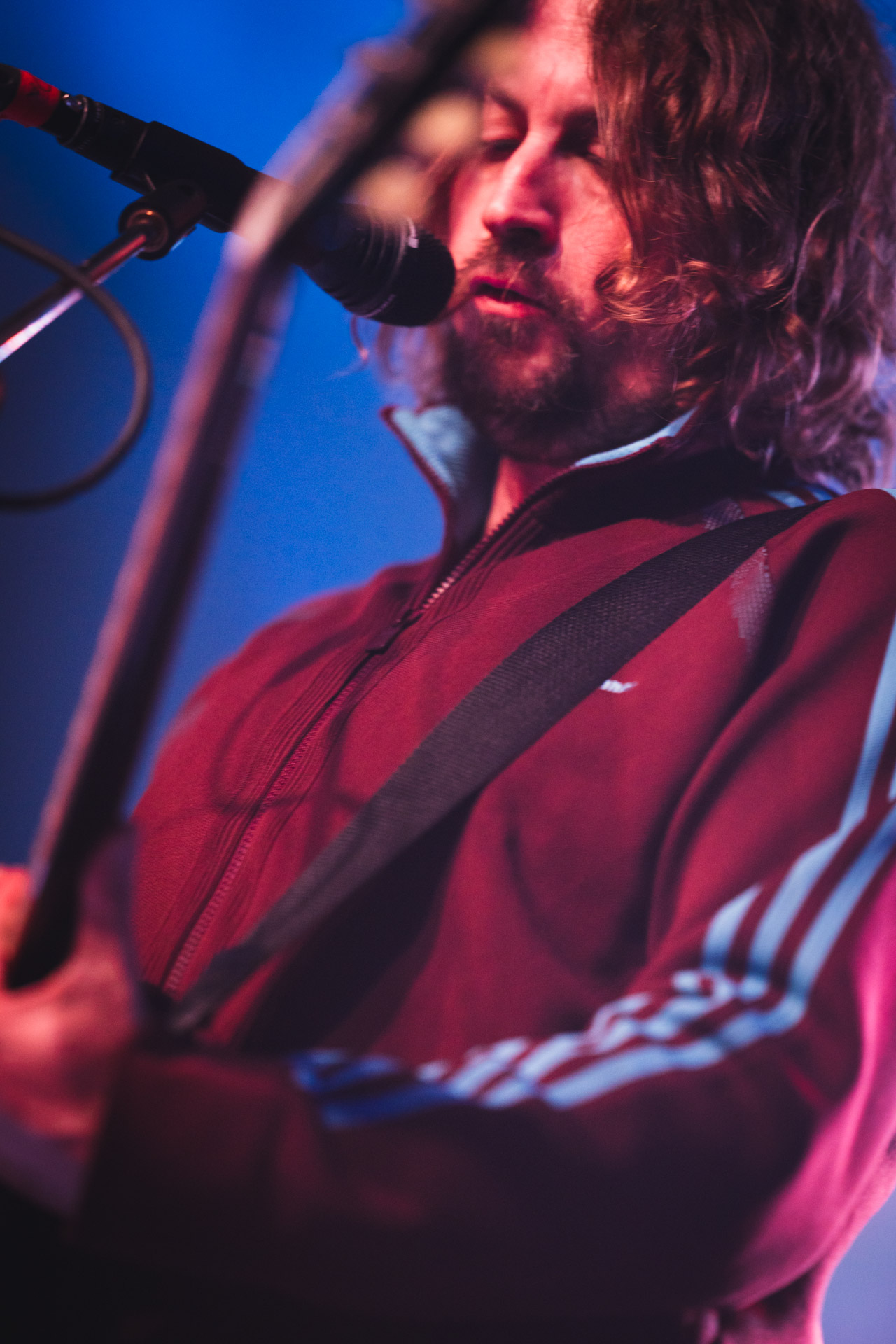
- McCabe performing with The Zutons in 2024

Background information
- Born: David Alan McCabe; 3 January 1981 (age 45); Whiston, Merseyside, England
- Genre: Indie rock
- Instruments: Vocals, guitar, piano
- Years active: 2000–present
- Labels: Deltasonic, Sony, 1965
- Member of: The Zutons
- Formerly of: Tramp Attack; The Justice Collective; The Ramifications; SILENT-K
- Spouse: Paula (m. 2024)

David Alan McCabe (born 3 January 1981) is an English singer, songwriter and guitarist, the frontman of The Zutons and a former member of Tramp Attack.

== History ==
McCabe was a member of Liverpool band Tramp Attack with Brookside actor Kristian Ealey. The band released their debut single "Rocky Hangover" in 2001, before McCabe left to form The Zutons. The band released 3 albums, before quietly disbanding in 2009.

In 2008, McCabe collaborated with singer-songwriter Thea Gilmore on the song "Old Soul", which appeared on the album Liejacker.

In 2010, McCabe co-wrote the Mark Ronson single "The Bike Song", which appeared on the DJ and producer's 2010 album Record Collection.

In 2012, McCabe provided vocals along with the likes of Paul McCartney and Robbie Williams to The Justice Collective Hillsborough charity single, a cover version of "He Ain't Heavy, He's My Brother".

McCabe returned as a solo artist in 2015, backed by new band the Ramifications, and adopted a more electronic style. McCabe had long wanted to explore such music but was unable to do so within the framework of the Zutons; he has expressed a love of electronic acts such as Depeche Mode, Kraftwerk, the Human League and OMD. Later in 2015 he released the album Church of Miami on 1965 Records.

Between 2017 and 2018 McCabe played bass guitar in Liverpool alternative rock band SILENT-K.

McCabe and The Zutons reformed to play several one-off gigs between 2016 & 2023, when the band announced that their fourth studio album would be released in spring 2024.

== Assault charge ==
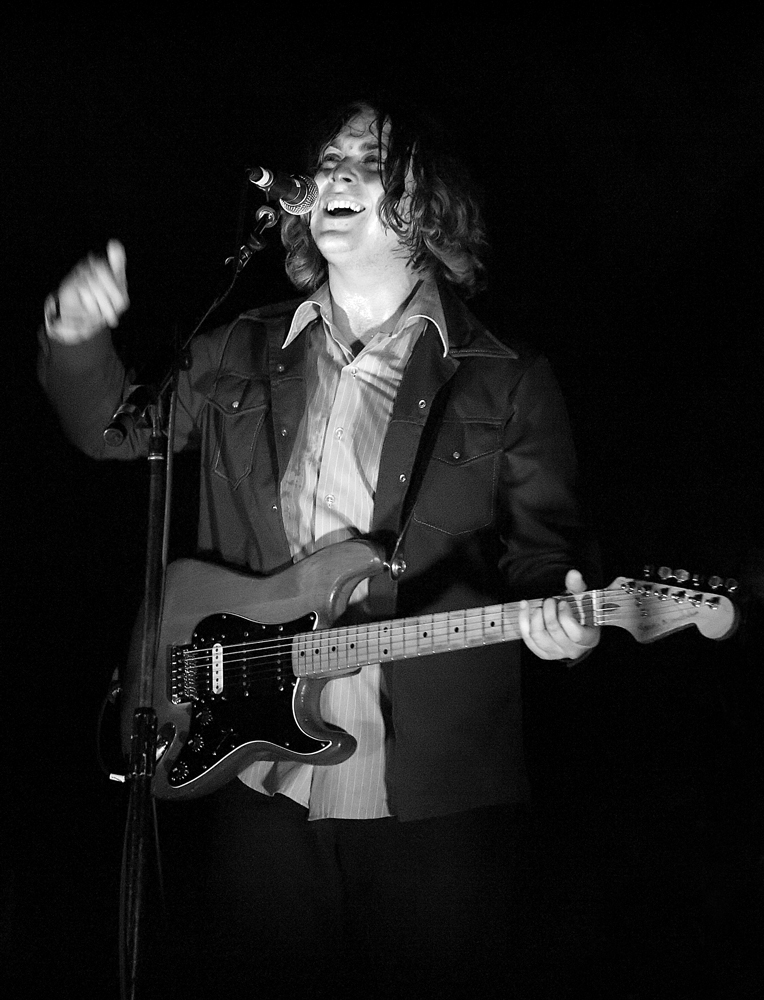
McCabe performing in 2005

In September 2010, McCabe was found guilty of assault after headbutting and breaking the nose of a 23-year-old student in Liverpool city centre. Reportedly provoked by the victim and his friends laughing about his coat, McCabe claimed he was protecting himself after the group surrounded him. The victim maintained that McCabe lunged at him after overhearing the group laughing. He was given a community order and ordered to pay the victim £1,500 plus court costs of £3,500.

== Personal life ==
In 2024, McCabe confirmed he is married to a woman named Paula, who he has son with. McCabe has said in many interviews in the press and on TV that his wife Paula changed his life and he ‘might not even be here’ without her, while giving her credit as the main reason the Zutons had its recent resurgence stating that fatherhood and falling for his wife saved him and the band.

== Discography ==
=== Albums ===
- Church of Miami (2015)
