= Guitaret =

Electric lamellophone

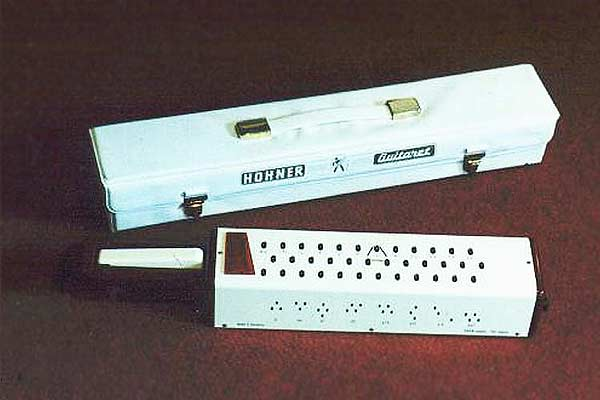
- Other names: Guitareti
- Classification: Electric lamellophone

Related instruments
- Electric thumb piano, Cembalet, Pianet

Builders
- Hohner

The Guitaret is an electric lamellophone made by Hohner and invented by Ernst Zacharias, in 1963. Zacharias also invented similar instruments like the Pianet, Cembalet and the Clavinet.

The instrument itself was not popular, and was dropped from the product line in 1965, presumably because it failed to excite the market. It was one of a number of experiments that Zacharias made converting non-standard musical instruments to modern ones. Guitarets that have survived have problems with the reed dampening system, which means that the instrument has come to be played with two hands.

Despite its obsolescence, its distinct tone has made it popular in both retro- and colourist settings, and it has experienced somewhat of a revival. It has been featured in soundtracks recently for this very reason.

The Guitaret's sound is that of a thumb piano. It is plugged into an amplifier, and sounds like an electric thumb piano.

== Instrument layout and playing ==
Scale view of the Guitaret notes.

The Guitaret is a rationalised lamellophone, making use of metal reeds or tines which are arranged in three rows within a white painted metal rectangular case approximately 30 centimetres long. The ends of the tines protrude slightly above the level of the casing. The player takes the guitaret with the left hand on the handle and uses the thumb of the right hand to pluck the tines. There are hidden tines that resonate with the plucked tines to swell the sounds. Although there are 3 rows of 12 tines each (36 Total), there are only 15 actual tones (1.5 Octaves), ranging from G♯3 to E5 owing to repetition.

A handle at the left-hand end of the instrument contains a large lever, called the "damper button", which operate a damper mechanism. By pressing the spring-loaded button, a damper mechanism lifts a series of felt pads which rest on the tines; by releasing the button, all the tines, including the resonating tines, are simultaneously muted.

The instrument is amplified up by a single electromagnetic pickup which is wrapped around all of the tines. The coil is directly connected to the output to the amplifier, it has no built-in amplification. The sound of the instrument on its own is very soft.

The three rows of tines are laid out in the cycle of fifths which permits easy performance of chord sequences, and they are arranged in such a manner that three- or four-note chords can be played with ease. At the top of the instrument case, these chords are laid out for the convenience of the player. The chords are major, minor, diminished seventh, major seventh, diminished, augmented, minor seventh and sixth.

An alternative method of two handed multi-finger playing is listed in the Facebook Guitaret Page as being invented by Lalli Barriere with the damper button held down with elastic bands, while Ivodne Galatea has created a five finger right-hand style for playing classical music, with the left hand being used for damping. Galatea has also created a tablature for playing the instrument classically and has arranged a repertoire for it from Bach, Beethoven and Debussy, as well as an arrangement for Guitaret consort of Reilly's In C.

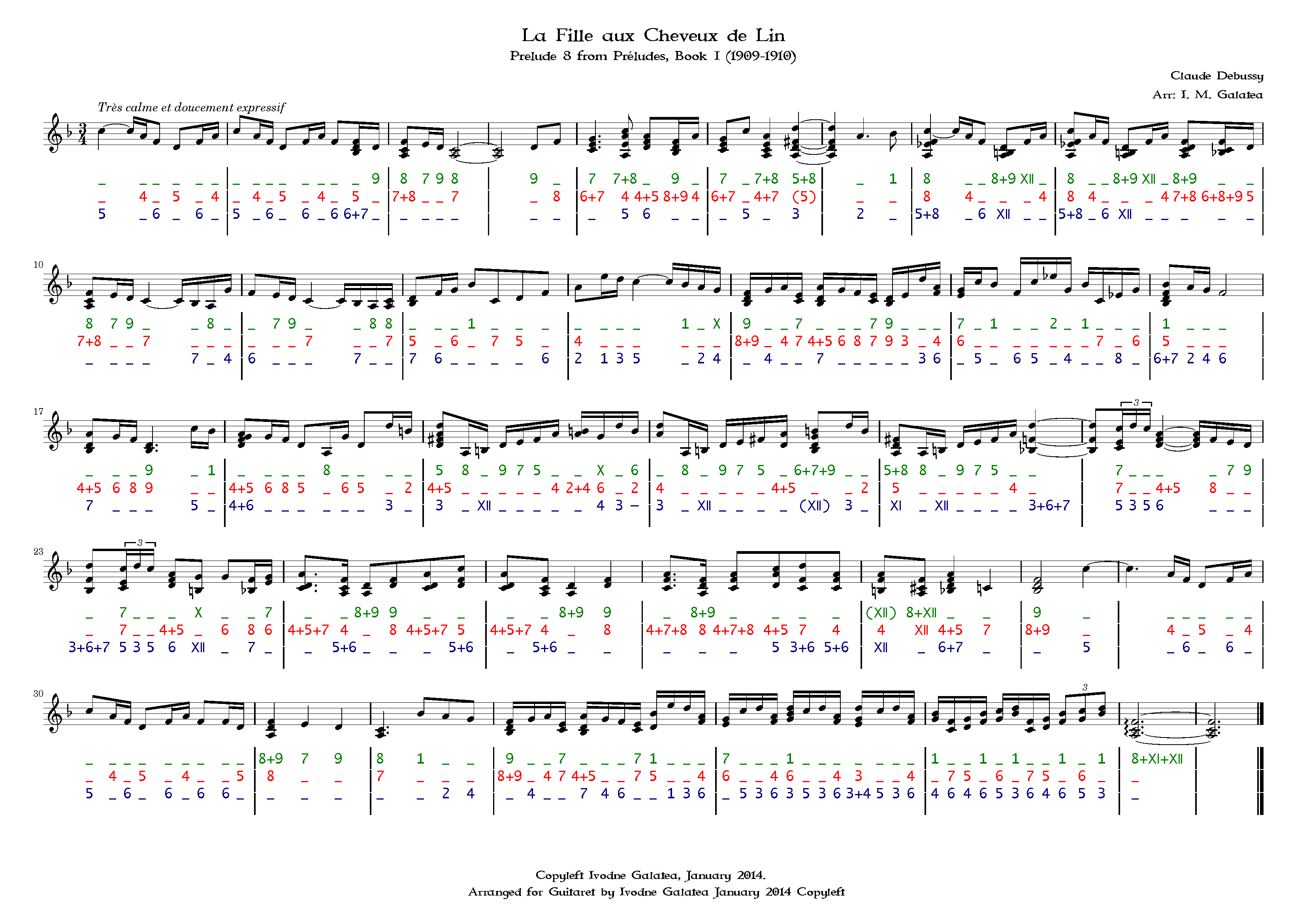
Debussy's La Fille aux Cheveux de Lin in Guitaret Tablature

== Famous performers ==
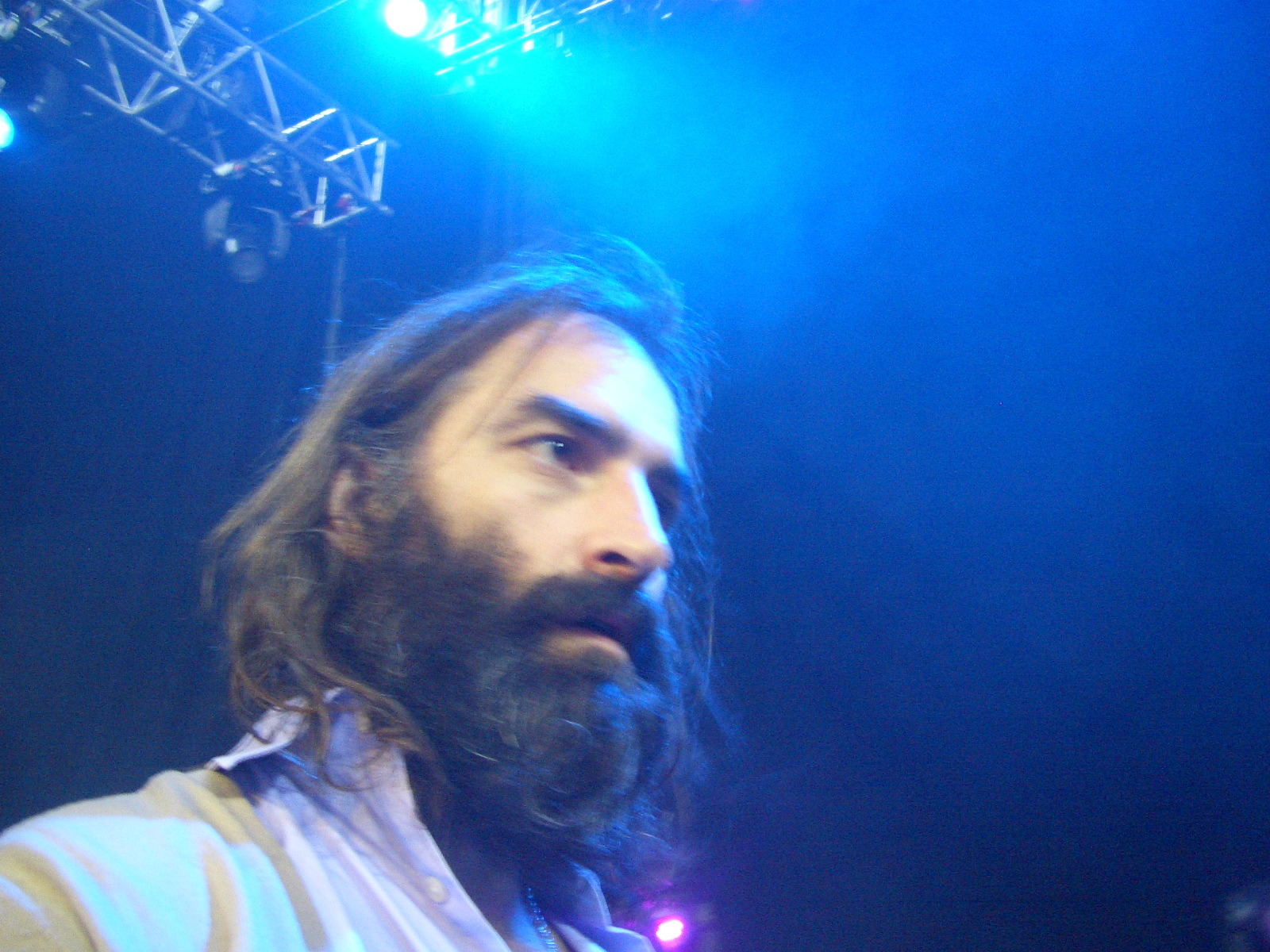
Warren Ellis in 2006.

- It is featured on Leo Abrahams's work (he was given a Guitaret by Brian Eno). Leo plays the Guitaret on the soundtrack for "Searching 1906" "I ended up playing a lot of guitaret (the rare thumb piano-like instrument that Eno gave me)."
- Warren Ellis plays Guitaret both on the Grinderman album and on the Soundtrack for The Assassination of Jesse James by the Coward Robert Ford
- Max Eastley (creator of instruments) plays Guitaret according to the Lord Jazz Discography
- Lali Barriere plays Guitaret in Pad (Projecte Achmed Digital) and with Ferran Fages in a Barcelona experimental duet GRUS. Lali also plays guitaret in "My Pony", last track of "Press the Space Bar", by Chicks on Speed and The No Heads. Lali also started the Guitaret Fan Club on Facebook, and contributed to Guitaret Album
- Michael Peters organised the Guitaret Album through the Guitaret Fan Club and uses the Guitaret for Live-looping. He played Guitaret in Tonlabor (2004–2006) as part of a collection of strange instruments
- Ivodne Galatea has released 3 albums of Guitaret music "The Ambitions of Curiosity", "The Geography of Thought" and "The Archaeology of Knowledge". Ivodne also contributed to the Guitaret Album.
- Saïd Zarrabi, the keyboardist in Les quitriches, a French beat band from Stuttgart, Germany and Quitriche-en-Auvergne, France doubles on Guitaret
- Aja West plays Guitaret on Aja West & Cheeba's Flash & Snowball
- Plamo includes Guitaret in his instrumentation.
- Roland Wolff plays the Guitaret in his stage music
- Martin Schnur plays his Guitaret sometimes in his stage music with the Original Wammertaler Musikanten.
- Icelandic band múm have Guitaret on their latest album and the track Illuminated features it
- Abandon the Earth Mission features a Guitaret
- The german singer Mine (Jasmine Stocker) plays the instrument on her song "Rot," from her 2016 album "Das Ziel ist im Weg".
- It is sampled in the MOTU Electric Keys, so the Guitaret sound is likely heard more than the Guitaret itself. It can be detected by the harsh metallic clicking of the high C. There is also a (defunct) one for 9V Audio which extends the range by octaves, but transposes an octave as well.
- Loren Bouchard plays it on the theme song of Bob's Burgers.
- Joanna Newsom plays one on the title track of the album Divers (album).
