= Music for Flute & Double-Bass =

Studio album by Jeremy Steig and Eddie Gómez
- Released: 1979
- Recorded: December 1978
- Studio: Electric Lady Studios, New York City, NY
- Genre: Jazz
- Length: 37:39
- Label: CMP; CMP 6 ST
- Producer: Kurt Renker

Jeremy Steig chronology
Lend Me Your Ears (1978)	Music for Flute & Double-Bass (1979)	Rain Forest (1980)

Eddie Gómez chronology
Lend Me Your Ears (1978)	Music for Flute & Double-Bass (1979)	Rain Forest (1980)

Music for Flute & Double-Bass is an album by flautist Jeremy Steig and bassist Eddie Gómez recorded in New York in 1978 and released on the German CMP label.

Professional ratings
Review scores
Source	Rating
AllMusic	3/5 stars

== Track listing ==
All compositions by Jeremy Steig and Eddie Gomez except where noted

1. "Aracelis" (Eddie Gomez) – 7:59
2. "Nein-Four" – 2:57
3. "Steigmatism" (Jeremy Steig) – 3:08
4. "7:11" (Steig) – 5:07
5. "Voyage of the Elves" – 10:07
6. "Space Shuttle" – 2:00
7. "Mezmerized" (Gomez) – 3:10
8. "Vamp's Bite" (Gomez) – 3:11

== Personnel ==
- Jeremy Steig – alto flute, bass flute, Mu-Tron III Mu-Tron biphase, Mu-Tron octave divider, echoplex, ring modulator
- Eddie Gómez − bass
