= Lend Me Your Ears (Jeremy Steig, Eddie Gómez and Joe Chambers album) =

Studio album by Jeremy Steig, Eddie Gómez, Joe Chambers
- Released: 1978
- Recorded: June 3 & 4, 1978
- Venue: Cornet Studios, Cologne, West Germany
- Genre: Jazz
- Length: 37:22
- Label: CMP; CMP 003
- Producer: Kurt Renker

Jeremy Steig chronology
Firefly (1977)	Lend Me Your Ears (1978)	Music for Flute & Double-Bass (1979)

Eddie Gómez chronology
Outlaws (1977)	Lend Me Your Ears (1978)	Music for Flute & Double-Bass (1979)

Joe Chambers chronology
Double Exposure (1977)	Lend Me Your Ears (1978)	New York Concerto (1981)

Lend Me Your Ears is an album by flautist Jeremy Steig, bassist Eddie Gómez and drummer/percussionist Joe Chambers recorded in West Germany in 1978 and released on the German CMP label.

== Reception ==
Professional ratings
Review scores
Source	Rating
AllMusic	3/5 stars

The AllMusic review by Ron Wynn stated "Good trio with Eddie Gomez and Joe Chambers".

== Track listing ==
All compositions by Jeremy Steig, Eddie Gomez and Joe Chambers except where noted

1. "Testimonium" (Jeremy Steig, Eddie Gomez) − 6:53
2. "The Rite of the Lynx" – 8:19
3. "Ria" (Gomez) – 4:08
4. "Steam Shovel" (Steig) – 3:39
5. "Electric Nipple" – 6:40
6. "Lend Me Your Ears" – 7:43

== Personnel ==
- Jeremy Steig – alto flute, bass flute, Mu-Tron III Mu-Tron biphase, Mu-Tron octave divider
- Eddie Gómez − bass
- Joe Chambers – drums, percussion
