= Rain Forest (Jeremy Steig and Eddie Gómez album) =

Studio album by Jeremy Steig and Eddie Gómez
- Released: 1980
- Recorded: February and March 1980
- Studio: Electric Lady Studios and Blank Tape Studios, New York City, NY
- Genre: Jazz
- Label: CMP; CMP 12 ST
- Producer: Eddie Gomez, Jeremy Steig, Kurt Renker

Jeremy Steig chronology
| Music for Flute & Double-Bass (1979) | Rain Forest (1980) | Jigsaw (1980) |

Eddie Gómez chronology
| Music for Flute & Double-Bass (1979) | Rain Forest (1980) | Gomez (1984) |

Rain Forest is an album by the flautist Jeremy Steig and the double bass player Eddie Gómez recorded in New York in 1980 and released on the German CMP label.

== Reception ==
Professional ratings
Review scores
| Source | Rating |
|---|---|
| AllMusic | 4.5/5 stars |

The AllMusic review by Michael G. Nastos says, "Virtuoso flute player. An improvisational tradition of various groupings."

== Track listing ==
All compositions by Jeremy Steig except where noted

1. "Dugnafied" − 5:20
2. "Rhumbline" (Gomez) − 6:20
3. "Sacrifice" − 6:47
4. "Rain Forest" (Gomez) − 4:48
5. "Amazon Express" − 3:15
6. "Rosa" (Gomez) − 3:44
7. "Carnival Sonata" (Gomez, Steig) − 5:40

== Personnel ==
- Jeremy Steig – flute, bass flute, digital delay Mu-Tron biphase, Mu-Tron octave divider
- Eddie Gómez − double bass
- Mike Nock − electric piano, synthesizer (tracks 2–4 & 6)
- Karl Ratzer − electric guitar (track 1)
- Jack DeJohnette (tracks 2 & 3), Steve Gadd (tracks 1 & 4) – drums
- Naná Vasconcelos − cuíca, berimbau, talking drum, shaker, cowbell, triangle, tambourine (tracks 3–5 & 7)
- Ray Barretto − congas (tracks 3 & 7)
