= Denny Zeitlin =

American jazz musician and professor of psychiatry

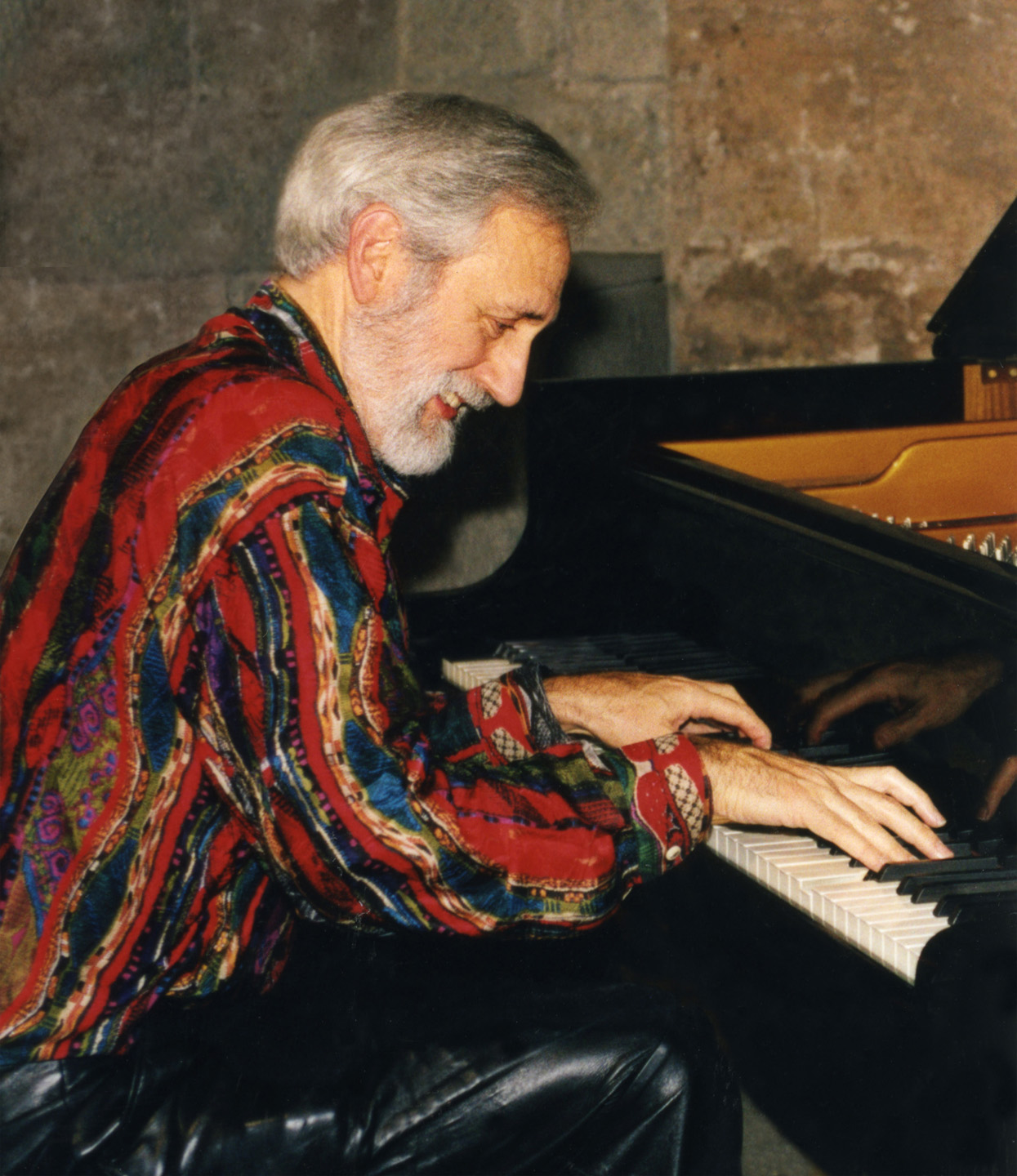
- Zeitlin in 2000

Background information
- Born: Dennis Jay Zeitlin; April 10, 1938 (age 88); Chicago, Illinois, U.S.
- Genre: Jazz
- Occupations: Musician, composer, clinical professor of psychiatry
- Instruments: Piano, synthesizer
- Years active: 1952–present
- Labels: Columbia/CBS, Sunnyside Records
- Website: dennyzeitlin.com

Denny Zeitlin (born April 10, 1938) is an American jazz pianist, composer, and clinical professor of psychiatry at University of California, San Francisco. Since 1963, he has recorded more than 100 compositions and was a first-place winner in the DownBeat International Jazz Critics' Poll in 1965 and 1974. He composed the soundtrack for the 1978 science-fiction horror film Invasion of the Body Snatchers.

== Early life ==
Zeitlin was born in Chicago, Illinois, and grew up in the Chicago suburb of Highland Park. He began improvising on the piano at the age of two. His father was a radiologist who played piano by ear. His mother was a speech pathologist and his first piano teacher. His parents allowed him to improvise on the piano for several years as a toddler, which he stated was crucial to his development and desire to begin formal study in classical music at the age of six. He started studying jazz in the eighth grade and cited George Shearing, Dave Brubeck, Billy Taylor, Lennie Tristano, Bud Powell, and Oscar Peterson as his primary early influences, and saw them perform in Chicago clubs as a teenager, able to pass for older due to being very tall.

In high school, Zeitlin played professionally in and around Chicago, and by college at the University of Illinois at Urbana–Champaign, was playing with Ira Sullivan, Johnny Griffin, Wes Montgomery, Joe Farrell, Wilbur Ware, and Bob Cranshaw, among others. His mentors included Billy Taylor and George Russell. Pianist Bill Evans, an early supporter, frequently recorded Zeitlin's composition "Quiet Now" and made it the title track of a 1970 album.

== Later life and career ==
Signed by Columbia Records's John Hammond, Zeitlin began his recording career in 1963 while studying medicine at Johns Hopkins University School of Medicine, debuting as the featured pianist on the Jeremy Steig album Flute Fever, which also featured Ben Riley and Ben Tucker. Zeitlin's recording debut as a leader was the album Cathexis, with bassist Cecil McBee and drummer Freddie Waits. Zeitlin then moved to San Francisco in 1964 to intern at the University of California, San Francisco, followed by a residency. His next album was Carnival, with bassist Charlie Haden and drummer Jerry Granelli. That trio had a regular gig at The Trident in Sausalito, California, and recorded Zeitlin's next album, Shining Hour, there.

Jazz critic Leonard Feather called Zeitlin "the most versatile young pianist to come to prominence in the early 1960s". Reflecting on Zeitlin's Columbia period, jazz historian Ted Gioia wrote that the pianist "had assimilated the breakthroughs of the previous decade, from the impressionism of Bill Evans to the free-fall explorations of Ornette Coleman, and blended them into a personal style that anticipated the next fifteen years of keyboard advances. He stood out from the crowd for the unbridled creativity of his work, the richness of his harmonic palette, and the sheer beauty of his piano tone".

Between 1968 and 1978, Zeitlin integrated electronic keyboards, synthesizers, and sound-altering devices with acoustic instruments, working in multiple musical genres. The results were first heard in 1969 when Zeitlin composed and performed music for the "Jazzy Spies" sequences on the first season of Sesame Street, featuring vocal overdubs by Grace Slick. In 1973, he released Expansion, a trio album with George Marsh (musician) and Mel Graves, which DownBeat magazine awarded its highest rating. The period culminated with Zeitlin's writing the score for the 1978 remake of Invasion of the Body Snatchers, which turned out to be his only film score, despite numerous subsequent offers, because of the extreme workload of many 20-plus-hour days. While New Yorker film critic Pauline Kael thought the music occasionally overpowered the action, she called the score "generally dazzling" and a large contributor to both the humor and terror of the film.

Beginning in 1978, Zeitlin focused primarily on acoustic music, continuing to play concerts internationally and recording some 22 albums. His projects included the solo album Soundings, the duo album Time Remembers One Time Once with Charlie Haden, and Denny Zeitlin Trio in Concert with bassist Buster Williams and drummer Matt Wilson. Zeitlin continued to draw strong reviews. Critic Doug Ramsey wrote that "Trio in Concert", released in 2009, "catches Dr. Zeitlin, at age 70, in his musical prime and his trio afire". He recorded his 2020 album, Live at Mezzrow, at age 82,

With the advent of electronic music technology improving dramatically in the 2000s, Zeitlin embarked on a major upgrade to his home studio and began to rediscover electro-acoustic music. He was soon joined by drummer George Marsh, and the two released several albums of free improvisation as a duo on Sunnyside Records.

== Dual careers ==
Since 1968, Zeitlin has been on the teaching faculty at the University of California, San Francisco, where he is clinical professor of psychiatry. He has a private practice in San Francisco and Marin County. He had a 30-year mentorship with psychoanalyst Joseph Weiss, founder of Control Mastery Theory. Zeitlin has combined his two disciplines in a lecture and workshop entitled "Unlocking the Creative Impulse: The Psychology of Improvisation".

In comparing his two careers, Zeitlin has said it would be a mistake to think that psychiatry served merely to support his passion for music, when in fact he has a passion for both. "In each setting, communication is utterly paramount. There has to be a depth of empathy that allows you to really inhabit the other person's world. It comes out as a collaborative journey in both settings."

== Personal life ==
Zeitlin lives in Marin County, California, is an avid mountain biker and wine aficionado, the latter interest shared with his trio. He has been married to actress Josephine Shady since 1969.

== Discography ==
=== As leader/co-leader ===
Recording date	Title	Label	Year released	Personnel / Notes
1964–02- 1964–03	Cathexis	Columbia	1964	Trio, with Cecil McBee (bass), Freddie Waits (drums)
1964–10	Carnival	Columbia	1964	Trio, with Charlie Haden (bass), Jerry Granelli (drums)
1965–03	Shining Hour - Live at The Trident	Columbia	1966	Trio, with Charlie Haden (bass), Jerry Granelli (drums); in concert; also known as Shining Hour
1966–04, 1967–03	Zeitgeist	Columbia	1967	Trio; some tracks with Charlie Haden (bass), Jerry Granelli (drums); some tracks with Joe Halpin (bass), Oliver Johnson (drums)
1969–11	The Name of This Terrain	Now-Again	2022	Trio, with Mel Graves (bass, electric bass, vocals), George Marsh (drums, percussion, vocals)
1973	Expansion	Double Helix	1973	Trio, with Mel Graves (bass, electric bass), George Marsh (drums, percussion)
1977	Syzygy	1750 Arch	1977	Most tracks trio, with Ratzo B. Harris (bass, electric bass), George Marsh (drums, percussion); one track quartet, with Rich Fudoli (tenor sax, clarinet, flute) added; one track quartet with Tom Buckner (vocals) added
1978	Invasion of the Body Snatchers	United Artists	1978	Soundtrack album for the 1978 film. Reissued as (Perseverance, 2003)[2CD].
1978?	Soundings	1750 Arch	1978	Solo piano; some tracks in concert
1981–07	Time Remembers One Time Once	ECM	1983	Duo, co-led with Charlie Haden (bass); in concert
1981–01, 1983–01, 1983–03	Tidal Wave	Palo Alto	1984	Quartet, with John Abercrombie (guitar), Charlie Haden (bass), Peter Donald (drums); one track in concert
1986?	Homecoming	Living Music	1986	Solo piano
1988	Trio	Windham Hill Jazz	1988	Trio, with Joel DiBartolo (bass, electric bass), Peter Donald (drums)
1988– 1989	In the Moment	Windham Hill Jazz	1989	Most tracks duo, with David Friesen (bass); in concert; some tracks trio, with Joel DiBartolo (bass), Peter Donald (drums)
1992	In Concert	ITM Pacific	1992	Duo, with David Friesen (bass); in concert
1992–10	Denny Zeitlin at Maybeck	Concord	1993	Solo piano; in concert
1994–06	Denny Zeitlin/David Friesen	Concord	1995	Duo, co-led with David Friesen (bass); in concert
1996–05	Live at the Jazz Bakery	Intuition	1999	Duo, co-led with David Friesen (bass); in concert at the Jazz Bakery
1997–12	As Long as There's Music	Venus	1998	Trio, with Buster Williams (bass), Al Foster (drums)
2001–06	New River	Acoustic Disc	2001	Duo, co-led with David Grisman (Mandolin)
2001–11	Stairway to the Stars	Sunnyside	2014	Trio, with Buster Williams (bass), Matt Wilson (drums); in concert
2003–08	Slick Rock	Maxjazz	2004	Trio, with Buster Williams (bass), Matt Wilson (drums)
2003–04, 2004–11	Solo Voyage	Maxjazz	2005	Solo piano, keyboards
2001–11, 2004–12, 2006–11	Trio in Concert	Sunnyside	2009	Trio, with Buster Williams (bass), Matt Wilson (drums); in concert
2008–01	Precipice	Sunnyside	2010	Solo piano; in concert
2009–03	Wishing On the Moon	Sunnyside	2018	Trio, with Buster Williams (bass), Matt Wilson (drums); in concert
2008–07, 2010–06	Labyrinth/Live Solo Piano	Sunnyside	2011	Solo piano; in concert
2011–10	Wherever You Are	Sunnyside	2012	Solo piano
2003– 2004, 2011– 2012	Both/And	Sunnyside	2013	Solo piano, keyboards, electronics
2013– 2014	Riding the Moment	Sunnyside	2015	Duo, co-led with George Marsh (drums, percussion)
2014–12	Early Wayne	Sunnyside	2016	Solo piano; in concert
2016–12	Remembering Miles	Sunnyside	2019	Solo piano; in concert
2015– 2017	Expedition	Sunnyside	2017	Duo, co-led with George Marsh (drums, percussion)
2018–12	Crazy Rhythm: Exploring George Gershwin	Sunnyside	2023	Solo piano; in concert
2014– 2019	Telepathy – Duo Electro-Acoustic Improvisations	Sunnyside	2021	Duo, co-led with George Marsh (drums, percussion)
2019–05	Live at Mezzrow	Sunnyside	2020	Trio, with Buster Williams (bass), Matt Wilson (drums); in concert
2019–11– 2019–12	Denny Zeitlin Solo Piano: With A Song In My Heart—Exploring the Music of Richard Rodgers	Sunnyside	2025	Solo piano; Music of Richard Rodgers
2012–12, 2013; 2019–05, 2023	Panopoly	Sunnyside	2024	Solo-piano (3 tracks), Trio; in concert (4 tracks) and Duo (5 tracks). All tracks previously unreleased.
2003–11, 2020, 2023, 2024, 2025	Odyssey	Sunnyside	2026	Trio; in concert (2 tracks), Solo-piano (3 tracks) and Duo (7 tracks)

Compilation

- The Columbia Studio Trio Sessions (Mosaic, 2009)[3CD] – includes over an hour of previously unreleased compositions

=== As sideman ===
With David Friesen

- Other Times Other Places (Global Pacific, 1989)
- Two for the Show (ITM Pacific , 1993) – rec. 1992–1993

With others

- David Grisman, Dawg Duos (Acoustic Disc, 1999)
- Jeremy Steig, Flute Fever (Columbia, 1964) – rec. 1963
