= Wayfaring Stranger (Jeremy Steig album) =

Studio album by Jeremy Steig
- Released: 1971
- Recorded: February 11, 1970
- Studio: A&R Studios, New York City, NY
- Genre: Jazz
- Length: 47:03
- Label: Blue Note; BST 84354
- Producer: Sonny Lester

Jeremy Steig chronology
Legwork (1970)	Wayfaring Stranger (1971)	Energy (1971)

Wayfaring Stranger is an album by American jazz flautist Jeremy Steig released on the Blue Note label in 1971.

== Reception ==
Professional ratings
Review scores
Source	Rating
Allmusic	4/5 stars

Allmusic's Thom Jurek said: "the group improvisation is at a premium, they move East, West, and even toward Latin ... They are anything but difficult to listen to, however; in fact, they’re both gorgeous and reflect how wide-ranging Steig’s (and by turn Gomez’s) vision was for the time".

== Track listing ==
All compositions by Jeremy Steig except where noted

1. "In the Beginning" – 8:18
2. "Mint Tea" – 5:20
3. "Wayfaring Stranger" (Traditional) – 11:00
4. "Waves" (Jeremy Steig, Eddie Gómez) – 5:54
5. "All Is One" (Steig, Gómez) – 10:48
6. "Space" (Steig, Gómez) – 5:43

== Personnel ==
- Jeremy Steig – flute
- Eddie Gómez − bass
- Sam Brown − guitar (track 3)
- Don Alias – drums, percussion (tracks 1–4)
