= Don Alias =

American drummer (1939–2006)

- Born: Charles Alias; December 25, 1939; New York City, New York, U.S.
- Died: March 28, 2006 (aged 66) New York, New York, U.S.
- Genres: Jazz; jazz fusion; Latin jazz
- Occupation: Musician
- Instrument: Percussion
- Years active: 1960s–2006
- Website: Official website

Charles "Don" Alias (ah-LIE-ahs; December 25, 1939 – March 28, 2006) was an American jazz percussionist.

Alias was best known for playing congas and other hand drums. He was also a capable drum kit performer. He played drums on the song "Miles Runs the Voodoo Down" from trumpeter Miles Davis's album Bitches Brew (1969), when neither Lenny White nor Jack DeJohnette was able to play the marching band-inspired rhythm requested by Davis. (Note: See the notes for The Complete Bitches Brew Sessions (1998)) He also played drums and percussion on the Joni Mitchell live album Shadows and Light.

Alias performed on hundreds of recordings and was best known for his associations with Miles Davis and saxophonist David Sanborn. He also performed and recorded with artists such as Weather Report, Joni Mitchell, Herbie Hancock, the Brecker Brothers, Jaco Pastorius, Pat Metheny, Nina Simone, and many others.

== Early life ==
Alias was born in New York City on December 25, 1939. He studied piano and guitar as a boy but turned to percussion, learning from the rhythms he learned on New York's streets and the one-on-one lessons with the percussionist Mongo Santamaria. At 16 years old, he was enrolled as a conga player for the Eartha Kitt Dance Foundation, when he landed his first professional gig playing with Dizzy Gillespie at the Newport Jazz Festival.

He had a degree in biology, studying at Gannon College and the Carnegie Institute for Biochemistry in Boston. During his time in Boston, he played in jazz night clubs, where he met students from the Berklee College of Music, which aided his entry into the music industry.

== Career ==
=== Touring with Stone Alliance ===
While at school in Boston, Alias met bassist Gene Perla, with whom he formed the jazz trio Stone Alliance in 1964. The group also included saxophonist Steve Grossman and mainly centered on jazz, Afro-Cuban, rock, and pop music. In 1976, the trio began a 15-day tour in Chile, launched through the US State Department Jazz Diplomacy program. The initial leg, with 10 locations in Chile, extended into a 6-month tour with stops in Uruguay, Brazil, Paraguay, and Argentina.

The group totaled two South American tours, four European tours, and two Canada tours. The band recorded four studio albums between 1976 and 1980, with live albums from Amsterdam, Buenos Aires, Berlin, and Bremen. After a 13-year hiatus, the group returned as a power trio with guitarist Mitch Stein playing two notable shows in New York City.

=== Work with Miles Davis, David Sanborn and others ===
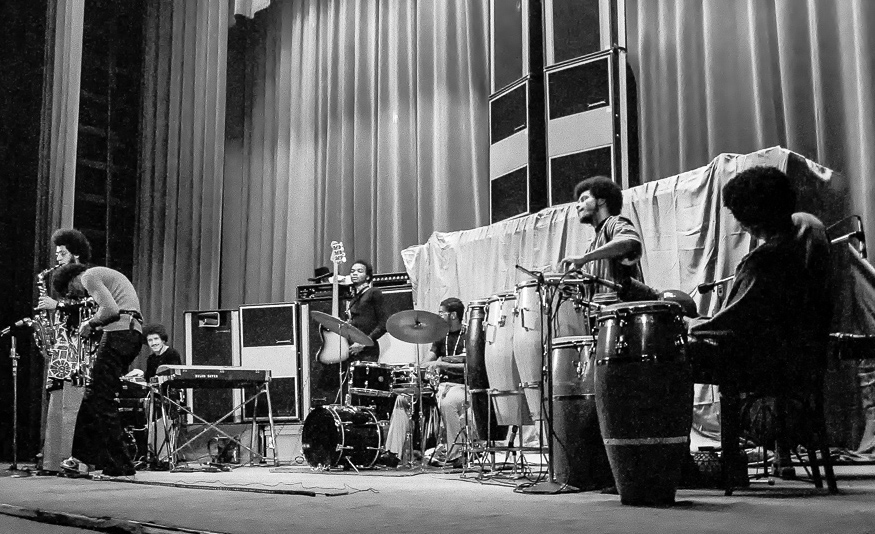
Charles "Don" Alias playing alongside Miles Davis, Keith Jarrett, Michael Henderson, Leon "Ndugu" Chancler, Gary Bartz, and James Forman.

His work with Nina Simone caught the eye of Miles Davis, who recruited him to play trap-set drums on Bitches Brew. Alias played alongside Jack DeJohnette utilizing a "lean and loose" syncopation that channels inspiration from New Orleans parade tunes.

Alias's most prominent work was with saxophonist David Sanborn, for whom he worked as a stage and studio player for nearly 20 years. During these sessions and beyond, Alias paid careful attention to detail and had a dedication to the improvement of every member of the group. Sanborn remarked that Alias would consistently come to sessions offering specific improvements based on the previous day's work. Sanborn said: "[Alias] immersed himself 100 percent in the music, and he gave his all to the music."

Alias was the drummer for Joni Mitchell's live album Shadows and Light, which features his drum kit on the cover. For Mitchell's second live album, she recruited many well-known jazz artists, such as Pat Metheny, Jaco Pastorius, Lyle Mays, and Michael Brecker. Alias was the studio percussionist for Mitchell's early jazz-influenced albums. On Don Juan's Reckless Daughter, he played congas, claves, snare drums, and sandpaper blocks; he also provided some background vocals. Alias played congas on the Mingus album.

== Style and influence ==
Alias credited his playing style to Cuban and Puerto Rican hand drummers, whose techniques he said he picked up from the streets of New York. As such, he often played congas, bongos, and other hand drums rather than a traditional drum kit.

Gene Perla was responsible for introducing Alias to singer-songwriter Nina Simone, for whom he switched gears and played a traditional full-set drum kit. This change did not present a challenge; instead, Alias thrived and eventually became her musical director. His work was important to Simone's growing interest in percussive sounds, and he's credited with a live performance on her 1970 album Black Gold.

== Death ==
Just before a planned tour with David Sanborn, Alias died at his home on March 28, 2006, at age 66.

== Discography ==
=== As sideman ===
With Philip Bailey

- Soul on Jazz (Heads Up International, 2002)

With Cheryl Bentyne

- Talk of The Town (Paddle Wheel, 2002)
- The Lights Still Burn (Paddle Wheel, 2003)
- Moonlight Serenade (King, 2003)
- The Book of Love (Telarc, 2006)

With Carla Bley

- Sextet (Watt, 1987)
- Fleur Carnivore (Watt, 1988)
- The Very Big Carla Bley Band (Watt, 1990)
- Looking for America (Watt, 2002)

With Blood, Sweat & Tears

- More Than Ever (Columbia, 1976)

With Jonathan Butler

- Heal Our Hand (Jive, 1990)
- Head to Head (Mercury, 1993)

With Uri Caine

- Toys (JMT, 1996)

With David Clayton-Thomas

- Bloodlines (DCT, 1999)

With Marc Cohn

- Marc Cohn (Atlantic, 1991)

With Miles Davis

- Bitches Brew (Columbia, 1970)
- On the Corner (Columbia, 1972)
- Amandla (Warner Bros., 1989)
- Miles Davis at Newport 1955-1975: The Bootleg Series Vol. 4 (Columbia Legacy, 2015)

With Jack DeJohnette

- Oneness (ECM, 1997)

With Klaus Doldinger

- Doldinger in New York – Street of Dreams (WEA, 1994)

With Eliane Elias

- So Far So Close (Blue Note, 1989)

With Joe Farrell

- Penny Arcade (CTI, 1973)

With Roberta Flack

- Oasis (Atlantic, 1988)
- The Christmas Album (Capitol, 1997)

With Dan Fogelberg

- The Innocent Age (Full Moon, 1981)

With Michael Franks

- Abandoned Garden (Warner Bros., 1995)

With Bill Frisell

- Unspeakable (Elektra Nonesuch, 2004)

With Hal Galper

- The Guerilla Band (Mainstream, 1971)

With Kenny Garrett

- Black Hope (Warner Bros, 1992)

With Don Grolnick Group

- Medianoche (Warner Bros., 1995)
- The Complete London Concert (Fuzzy Music, 2000)

With Herbie Hancock

- The New Standard (Verve, 1996)

With Ian Hunter

- All American Alien Boy (Columbia, 1976)

With Elvin Jones

- Merry-Go-Round (Blue Note, 1971)

With Dave Liebman

- Sweet Hands (Horizon, 1975)

With Joe Lovano

- Tenor Legacy (Blue Note, 1993)

With Pat Metheny Group

- Imaginary Day (Warner, 1997)

With Bob Mintzer

- One Music (DMP, 1991)

With Joni Mitchell

- Don Juan's Reckless Daughter (Asylum, 1977)
- Mingus (Asylum, 1979)
- Shadows and Light (Asylum, 1980)

With Jane Monheit

- In the Sun (N-Coded, 2002)

With Pages

- Future Street (Epic, 1979)

With Jaco Pastorius

- Jaco Pastorius (Epic, 1976)
- Word of Mouth (Warner Bros., 1981)

With Weather Report

- Weather Report (Columbia, 1971) – uncredited
- Black Market (Columbia, 1976)

With Lou Reed

- Ecstasy (Sire, 2000)

With Sanne Salomonsen

- In a New York Minute (Virgin, 1998)

With Carlos Santana and John McLaughlin

- Love Devotion Surrender (Columbia, 1973)

With Lalo Schifrin

- Black Widow (CTI, 1976)

With Marlena Shaw

- Love Is in Flight (Verve, 1988)

With Nina Simone

- To Love Somebody (RCA, 1969)

With Jeremy Steig

- Legwork (Solid State, 1970)
- Wayfaring Stranger (Blue Note, 1971)
- Energy (Capitol, 1971)
- Fusion (Groove Merchant, 1972)

With Ira Sullivan

- Ira Sullivan (Horizon, 1976)

With Steve Swallow

- Carla (Xtra Watt, 1987)
- Swallow (Xtra Watt, 1991)

With James Taylor

- New Moon Shine (Columbia, 1991)

With The Tony Williams Lifetime

- Ego (Polydor, 1971)
