= Black Widow (Lalo Schifrin album) =

Studio album by Lalo Schifrin
- Released: 1976
- Recorded: March 29 & 30, 1976
- Studios: Mediasound, New York City
- Genre: Jazz
- Length: 63:24
- Labels: CTI; CTI 5000
- Producer: Creed Taylor

Lalo Schifrin chronology
Enter the Dragon (1973)	Black Widow (1976)	Towering Toccata (1977)

Black Widow is an album by Argentine composer, pianist and conductor Lalo Schifrin recorded in 1976 and released on the CTI label.

== Reception ==
The Allmusic review called it "one of the peak albums in Lalo Schifrin's lengthy catalogue and a necessity for anyone interested in his jazz work".

Professional ratings
Review scores
Source	Rating
Allmusic	4.5/5 stars

== Track listing ==
All compositions by Lalo Schifrin except as indicated

1. "Black Widow" – 4:11
2. "Flamingo" (Edmund Anderson, Ted Grouya) – 4:31
3. "Quiet Village" (Les Baxter) – 5:45
4. "Moonglow/Theme from Picnic" (Will Hudson, Irving Mills, Eddie DeLange/George Duning, Steve Allen) – 6:13
5. "Jaws" (John Williams) – 6:01
6. "Baia" (Ary Barroso, Ray Gilbert) – 4:49
7. "Turning Point" – 3:29
8. "Dragonfly" – 5:45
9. "Frenesi" (Alberto Dominguez) – 3:53 Bonus track on CD reissue
10. "Tabú" (Margarita Lecuona) – 4:33 Bonus track on CD reissue
11. "Baia" (Barroso, Gilbert) – 7:44 Bonus track on CD reissue
12. "Con Alma" – 6:30 Bonus track on CD reissue
- Recorded at Mediasound Studios in New York City on March 29 & 30, 1976

== Personnel ==
- Lalo Schifrin – piano, keyboards, arranger, conductor
- Jon Faddis – trumpet
- Wayne Andre, Billy Campbell, Barry Rogers – trombone
- Dave Taylor – bass trombone
- Pepper Adams – baritone saxophone
- Joe Farrell – alto saxophone, flute
- Jerry Dodgion, Hubert Laws, George Marge – flute
- Clark Spangler – keyboards
- Eric Gale, Jerry Friedman, John Tropea – guitar
- Anthony Jackson – bass
- Andy Newmark – drums
- Don Alias, Carter Collins, Sue Evans, Carlos Martin – percussion
- Patti Austin – vocals
- Max Ellen, Paul Gershman, Emanuel Green, Harold Kohon, Charles Libove, Harry Lookofsky, David Nadien, Matthew Raimondi – violin
