= Towering Toccata =

Studio album by Lalo Schifrin
- Released: 1977
- Recorded: October 18 & 20 and December 21, 1976
- Studio: Van Gelder Studio, Englewood Cliffs, New Jersey
- Genre: Jazz
- Label: CTI; CTI 5003
- Producer: Creed Taylor

Lalo Schifrin chronology
| Black Widow (1976) | Towering Toccata (1977) | Voyage of the Damned (1977) |

Towering Toccata is an album by Argentine composer, pianist and conductor Lalo Schifrin recorded in 1976 and released on the CTI label.

== Reception ==
The Allmusic review states "it isn't the ideal follow-up to Black Widow that Schifrin fans might have hoped for. That said, the album has enough strong tunes and enough of a consistent sound to please hardcore Lalo Schifrin fans and anyone who loved Black Widow".

Professional ratings
Review scores
| Source | Rating |
|---|---|
| Allmusic | 3/5 stars |

The song "Roller Coaster" would be re-recorded and released on Schifrin's soundtrack to the 1977 film Rollercoaster.

== Track listing ==
All compositions by Lalo Schifrin except as indicated

1. "Towering Toccata" (Johann Sebastian Bach) - 5:04
2. "Frances' Theme" - 4:19
3. "Macumba" - 6:12
4. "Eagles in Love" - 2:51
5. "Theme from King Kong" (John Barry) - 4:12
6. "Most Wanted Theme" - 2:44
7. "Midnight Woman" - 6:07
8. "Roller Coaster" - 4:45
- Recorded at Van Gelder Studio in Englewood Cliffs, New Jersey on October 18 & 20 and December 21, 1976

== Personnel ==
- Lalo Schifrin - piano, keyboards, arranger, conductor
- Burt Collins, John Frosk, John Gatchell - trumpet
- Urbie Green - trombone
- Joe Farrell, Jeremy Steig - flute
- Gerry Niewood - alto saxophone
- David Tofani, Lou Marini - tenor saxophone, flute
- Ronnie Cuber - baritone saxophone
- Clark Spangler - keyboards
- Eric Gale, John Tropea - guitar
- Will Lee - bass
- Steve Gadd - drums, dahka-de-bello
- Max Ellen, Paul Gershman, Emanuel Green, Charles Libove, Marvin Morgenstern, David Nadien, Max Pollikoff, Matthew Raimondi - violin
- Lamar Alsop, Manny Vardi - viola
- Charles McCracken, Alan Shulman - cello
