= This Is Jeremy Steig =

Studio album by Jeremy Steig
- Released: 1969
- Recorded: 1969
- Studio: New York City, NY
- Genre: Jazz
- Length: 42:04
- Label: Solid State; SS 18059
- Producer: Sonny Lester

Jeremy Steig chronology
What's New (1969)	This Is Jeremy Steig (1969)	Legwork (1970)

This Is Jeremy Steig is an album by American jazz flautist Jeremy Steig released on the Solid State label in 1969. The album features three compositions by folksinger Tim Hardin whom Steig had accompanied in 1966.

Professional ratings
Review scores
Source	Rating
Allmusic	4.5/5 stars

== Track listing ==
All compositions by Jeremy Steig except where noted

1. "Flute Diddley" − 6:41
2. "Hang On to a Dream" (Tim Hardin) − 3:01
3. "Teresa's Blues" (Chris Hills) − 10:46
4. "Don't Make Promises" (Hardin) − 5:40
5. "Rational Nonsense" − 7:42
6. "Lenny's Tomb" (Hardin) − 5:12
7. "Insanity" − 0:56
8. "Mac D" − 2:06

== Personnel ==
- Jeremy Steig – flute, alto flute, piccolo, bansuri
- Warren Bernhardt – electric piano
- Glen Moore − bass, electric upright bass
- Donald MacDonald – drums

Technical

- Malcolm Addey – engineer
- Frank Guana – art direction
