= Denny Zeitlin at Maybeck =

Live album by Denny Zeitlin
- Released: 1993
- Recorded: October 18, 1992
- Venues: Maybeck Recital Hall, Berkeley, California
- Genre: Jazz
- Label: Concord
- Producer: Carl Jefferson with Nick Phillips

Denny Zeitlin chronology
In Concert (1992)	Denny Zeitlin at Maybeck (1993)	Denny Zeitlin/David Friesen (1995)

Denny Zeitlin at Maybeck: Maybeck Recital Hall Series Volume 27 is an album of solo performances by jazz pianist Denny Zeitlin.

== Music and recording ==
The album was recorded at the Maybeck Recital Hall in Berkeley, California in October 1992. Most of the material is standards.

== Release and reception ==
Professional ratings
Review scores
Source	Rating
AllMusic	4.5/5 stars
The Penguin Guide to Jazz	4/4 stars
The Rolling Stone Jazz & Blues Album Guide	5/5 stars

The Penguin Guide to Jazz suggested that the album should improve Zeitlin's musical standing. The AllMusic reviewer wrote that "This live solo performance is one of his greatest triumphs". Pianist Liam Noble described the performance of "'Round Midnight": "this harmony is startlingly beautiful, quietly rendered and with its own strange disquiet, and carefully arranged. This is a recomposition... at first it feels like he could go anywhere with it, plucked strings against single lines seeming to abandon the chords completely before he eases into a medium tempo swing".

== Track listing ==
1. "Blues on the Side"
2. "Girl Next Door"
3. "My Man's Gone Now"
4. "Lazy Bird"
5. "'Round Midnight"
6. "Love for Sale"
7. "And Then I Wondered If You Knew"
8. "Country Fair"
9. "Sophisticated Lady"
10. "The End of a Love Affair"
11. "Just Passing By"
12. "What Is This Thing Called Love?/Fifth House"

== Personnel ==
- Denny Zeitlin – piano
