= Ernst Zacharias =

German musician (1924–2020)

Ernst Zacharias (21 June 1924 – 6 July 2020) was a German musician and engineer. In the 1950s and 1960s, he invented various electro-mechanical musical instruments for the German musical instrument manufacturer Hohner, including the Cembalet, the Clavinet, the Guitaret, and the Pianet. The Claviola, a modernisation of the sheng and the Harmonetta, a mouth-blown concertina-keyboarded instrument, was also invented by Zacharias. He additionally invented the Electra-Melodica, the first commercially produced wind synthesizer. DEPATIS lists 90 patents by Ernst Zacharias for Hohner, including plastic recorders and watch and clock mechanisms.
