= Legwork (album) =

Studio album by Jeremy Steig
- Released: 1970
- Recorded: February 11, 1970
- Studio: New York City
- Genre: Jazz-funk
- Length: 42:04
- Labels: Solid State; SS 18068
- Producer: Sonny Lester

Jeremy Steig chronology
This Is Jeremy Steig (1969)	Legwork (1970)	Energy (1971)

Legwork is an album by American jazz flautist Jeremy Steig released on the Solid State label in 1970.

== Reception ==
Professional ratings
Review scores
Source	Rating
Allmusic	3/5 stars

Allmusic's Wilson McCloy said: "Legwork has long been a "rare-groove" collectors' favorite, and for good reason. The versatile Eddie Gomez lays down funky and compelling grooves throughout on acoustic bass while not hesitating to swing when necessary, walking his bass lines over Don Alias' sometimes sparse yet authoritative drumming. Steig utilizes a seemingly endless array of flute techniques, soaring above and interacting with the rhythm section. On several tracks he uses overdubbing effectively, calling and responding to his lines. The whole album is truly eclectic, spanning funk, exotic ostinatos, blues, Miles Davis' "Nardis," and freer excursions ... Legwork remains one of the high points of Steig's recorded work".

Nat Hentoff in his liner notes says, "As a long-time appreciator of the vaulting energy and irrepressible creativeness that are to me synonymous with Jeremy Steig, I find this album especially regenerating."

The song "Howlin' For Judy" was later sampled by the Beastie Boys and, ironically, made more money for him than anything he ever did.

== Track listing ==
All compositions by Jeremy Steig except where noted

1. "Howlin' for Judy" – 4:38
2. "Permutations" (Steig, Eddie Gómez) – 8:00
3. "Hot-Head" (Steig, Gómez, Sam Brown, Don Alias) – 8:50
4. "Alias (a li' as)" (Steig, Gómez, Alias) – 4:18
5. "Nardis" (Miles Davis) – 11:02
6. "Piece of Freedom" (Steig, Gómez) – 6:02

== Personnel ==
- Jeremy Steig – flute
- Eddie Gómez − bass, electric upright bass
- Don Alias – drums
- Sam Brown – guitar on "Hot-Head"
- Nat Hentoff - liner notes
- Sam Feldman, sound engineer at Bell Sound Studios - mastering and post production
- Frank Gauna - art direction
- Jeremy Steig - artwork
