= Fusion (Jeremy Steig album) =

Studio album by Jeremy Steig
- Released: 1972
- Recorded: 1970
- Studio: Electric Lady Studios, New York City, NY
- Genre: Jazz
- Length: 77:50
- Label: Groove Merchant; GM 2204
- Producer: Sonny Lester

Jeremy Steig chronology
Energy (1971)	Fusion (1972)	Monium (1974)

Fusion (also released as Something Else) is a double LP album by American jazz flautist Jeremy Steig released on the Groove Merchant label which reissues tracks recorded in 1970 and originally issued on Energy along with an additional LP of unreleased tracks from the session.

== Reception ==
Professional ratings
Review scores
Source	Rating
Allmusic	4/5 stars

Allmusic's Jason Ankeny said: "Steig creates Technicolor grooves that float like butterflies and sting like bees. His music doesn't so much fuse jazz and rock as it approaches each side from the perspective of the other, exploring their respective concepts and executions to arrive at a sound all its own. If anything, the tonal restrictions of Steig's chosen instrument push him even farther into the unknown, employing a series of acoustic and electronic innovations to expand the flute's possibilities seemingly into the infinite. While some of the unissued content here is no less astounding, as a whole Fusion feels like too much of a good thing; one can't help but miss the focus and shape of Energy in its original incarnation".

== Track listing ==
All compositions by Jan Hammer and Jeremy Steig except where noted

1. "Home" − 4:39 Originally released on Energy
2. "Cakes" − 4:52 Originally released on Energy
3. "Swamp Carol" − 4:11 Originally released on Energy
4. "Energy" (Hammer, Steig, Don Alias, Gene Perla) − 4:50 Originally released on Energy
5. "Down Stretch" (Hammer) − 4:14 Originally released on Energy
6. "Give Me Some" − 6:47 Originally released on Energy
7. "Come with Me" − 8:02 Originally released on Energy
8. "Dance of the Mind" (Alias, Steig) − 2:22 Originally released on Energy
9. "Up Tempo Thing" − 5:23 Previously unreleased
10. "Elephant Hump" − 5:54 Previously unreleased
11. "Rock #6" (Hammer) − 3:03 Previously unreleased
12. "Slow Blues in G" − 6:33 Previously unreleased
13. "Rock #9" (Hammer) − 5:50 Previously unreleased
14. "Rock #10" (Hammer) − 4:14 Previously unreleased
15. "Something Else" − 7:02 Previously unreleased

== Personnel ==
- Jeremy Steig – flute, alto flute, bass flute, piccolo
- Jan Hammer − electric piano, Chinese gong
- Gene Perla − electric bass, electric upright bass
- Don Alias – drums, congas, clap drums, percussion
- Eddie Gómez − electric upright bass (tracks 5 & 7)
