= Time Remembers One Time Once =

Live album by Denny Zeitlin & Charlie Haden
- Released: April 1983
- Recorded: July 1981
- Venue: Keystone Korner; San Francisco, CA
- Genre: Jazz
- Length: 53:40
- Label: ECM; ECM 1239
- Producer: Manfred Eicher

Denny Zeitlin chronology
Soundings (1978)	Time Remembers One Time Once (1983)	Tidal Wave (1984)

Charlie Haden chronology
Folk Songs (1981)	Time Remembers One Time Once (1983)	The Ballad of the Fallen (1983)

Time Remembers One Time Once is a live album by American jazz pianist Denny Zeitlin and bassist Charlie Haden, recorded at the Keystone Korner in July 1981 and released on ECM in April 1983.

== Reception ==
AllMusic's Ken Dryden wrote, "The occasional over-modulation in this recording doesn't detract from the outstanding performances and this CD should be essential for fans of either Denny Zeitlin and/or Charlie Haden."

Professional ratings
Review scores
Source	Rating
AllMusic	4/5 stars
DownBeat	4.5/5 stars
The Rolling Stone Jazz Record Guide	4/5 stars
The Penguin Guide to Jazz Recordings	3.5/4 stars

== Track listing ==
Side I
No.	Title	Writer(s)	Length
1.	"Chairman Mao"	Charlie Haden	6:35
2.	"Bird Food"	Ornette Coleman	9:53
3.	"As Long as There's Music"	Sammy Cahn; Jule Styne	6:53
4.	"Time Remembers One Time Once"	Denny Zeitlin	4:27

Side II
No.	Title	Writer(s)	Length
1.	"Love for Sale"	Cole Porter	7:04
2.	"Ellen David"	Charlie Haden	6:37
3.	"Satellite/How High the Moon"	John Coltrane/Nancy Hamilton, Morgan Lewis	8:05
4.	"The Dolphin"	Luiz Eça	4:06

== Personnel ==
- Denny Zeitlin – piano
- Charlie Haden – bass
