= Mike Beigel =

American electronics engineer

- Born: Michael Lee Beigel; January 29, 1947; Manhattan, New York, U.S.
- Died: September 15, 2026 (aged 79); Mukilteo, Washington, U.S.
- Education: Massachusetts Institute of Technology
- Occupation: Electronics engineer
- Children: 1

Michael Lee Beigel (January 29, 1947 – September 15, 2026) was an American electronics engineer.

== Early life and career ==
Beigel was born in Manhattan, New York on January 29, 1947, the son of Jerome Beigel, an advertising agent, and Freida Marks, a bookkeeper. At an early age, he and his family moved to Miami, Florida. He attended Miami Beach Senior High School, graduating in 1964. After graduating, he attended the Massachusetts Institute of Technology, earning his bachelor's degrees in electrical engineering and humanities engineering.

In 1972, Beigel founded Mu-Tron, an electronic musical effects manufacturer in New Jersey. At his manufacturer company, he created the envelope filter Mu-Tron III, which was used in Stevie Wonder's hit single "Higher Ground". He also created the Bi-Phase, the Phasor, the Flanger, the Vol-Wah Pedal and the Octave Divider. In 2025, he was awarded the certificate of recognition by The Recording Academy, "for his achievements in music engineering and innovation".

== Personal life and death ==
Beigel had one child, who is a industrial engineer at Boeing, a multinational corporation.

Beigel was diagnosed with Dercum's disease, and he died at his home in Mukilteo, Washington on September 15, 2026, at the age of 79.
