= Firefly (Jeremy Steig album) =

Studio album by Jeremy Steig
- Released: 1977
- Recorded: March 4 & 22 and April 11, 1977
- Studio: Electric Lady Studios, New York City
- Genre: Jazz
- Length: 35:29
- Label: CTI; CTI 7075
- Producer: Creed Taylor

Jeremy Steig chronology
Outlaws (1977)	Firefly (1977)	Lend Me Your Ears (1978)

Firefly is an album by American flautist Jeremy Steig recorded in 1977 and released on the CTI label.

== Reception ==
The Allmusic review stated "Jeremy Steig's jazz-funk throwdown, Firefly, is one of the great forgotten masterpieces of the genre... Firefly was designed for the purpose of being a hit in the dance clubs, and it should have been, because it kicks ass on that level as well as on the jazz-funk beam... This is burning".

Professional ratings
Review scores
Source	Rating
Allmusic	4/5 stars
The Rolling Stone Jazz Record Guide	2/5 stars

== Track listing ==
1. "Firefly" (Googie Coppola, David Matthews) – 11:55
2. "Living Inside Your Love" (Dave Grusin, Earl Klugh) – 5:48
3. "Everything Is Coming to the Light" (Coppola) – 2:59
4. "Hop Scotch" (Joe Chambers) – 7:26
5. "Sweet Hour of Prayer" (Traditional) – 2:04
6. "Grasshopper" (Jeremy Steig) – 5:17
  - Recorded at Electric Lady Studios in New York City on March 4 (tracks 1, 2 & 6), March 22 (track 3) and April 11 (tracks 4 & 5), 1977

== Personnel ==
- Jeremy Steig – flute
- Burt Collins, Jon Faddis, Joe Shepley, Lew Soloff – trumpet
- Sam Burtis, Jerry Chamberlain, Tom Malone – trombone
- Dave Taylor – bass trombone
- Richard Tee – keyboards
- Richie Beirach – piano
- Clifford Carter – synthesizer
- Hiram Bullock, Eric Gale, John Scofield – electric guitar
- Gary King – bass
- Steve Gadd, Allan Schwartzberg – drums
- Ray Mantilla – congas
- Googie Coppolla – vocals
- Sue Evans – percussion
- David Matthews – electric piano, arranger
