= Jeremy & The Satyrs =

Studio album by Jeremy Steig & The Satyrs
- Released: 1968
- Recorded: 1968
- Genre: Jazz
- Length: 43:29
- Label: Reprise; R/RS 6282
- Producer: John Court

Jeremy Steig chronology
Flute Fever (1964)	Jeremy & The Satyrs (1968)	What's New (1969)

Jeremy & The Satyrs is an album by American jazz flautist Jeremy Steig released on the Reprise label in 1968. Steig initially formed the group to back folksinger Tim Hardin in 1966.

== Reception ==
Professional ratings
Review scores
Source	Rating
Allmusic	3/5 stars

Allmusic's Ritchie Unterberger said: "its early jazz-rock fusion, with bits of soul and blues, was better on paper than in execution. ... at times, about the only thing separating this from run-of-the-mill blues-rock or soul-rock was the very jazzy flute".

== Track listing ==
All compositions by Adrian Guillery except where noted

1. "In the World of Glass Teardrops" − 5:22
2. "Superbaby" (Warren Bernhardt) − 3:52
3. "She Didn't Even Say Goodbye" − 6:30
4. "The Do It" (Guillery, Bernhardt) − 2:58
5. "The First Time I Saw You Baby (With Your Pretty Green Eyes)" − 3:29
6. "Lovely Child of Tears" (Bernhardt) − 3:55
7. "(Let's Go to the) Movie Show" − 2:41
8. "Mean Black Snake" (Traditional) − 5:15
9. "Canzonetta" (Eddie Gómez) − 2:25
10. "Foreign Release" (The Satyrs) − 3:21
11. "Satyrized" − 3:41

== Personnel ==
- Jeremy Steig – flute
- Adrian Guillery − guitar, harmonica, vocals
- Warren B. Bernhardt − electric piano, vocals
- Eddie Gómez − bass
- Donald McDonald – drums

Technical

- Ed Thrasher - art direction
- Jeremy Steig - cover illustration
