= Outlaws (Jeremy Steig and Eddie Gómez album) =

Live album by Jeremy Steig and Eddie Gómez
- Released: 1977
- Recorded: December 15, 1976
- Venue: Die Glocke, Bremen, Germany
- Genre: Jazz
- Length: 38:35
- Label: Enja enja 2098
- Producer: Jeremy Steig, Eddie Gómez

Jeremy Steig chronology
Leaving (1976)	Outlaws (1977)	Firefly (1977)

Eddie Gómez chronology
Down Stretch (1976)	Leaving (1976)	Lend Me Your Ears (1978)

Outlaws is a live album featuring duets by flautist Jeremy Steig and bassist Eddie Gómez recorded in Germany in 1976 and released on the German Enja label the following year.

== Reception ==
Professional ratings
Review scores
Source	Rating
AllMusic	4/5 stars

The AllMusic review by Ken Dryden stated that it "works extremely well because of the virtuoso talent of both musicians, along with their obviously compatibility" and ""Although this may very well have been a one-time event, it is much more than a novelty. Considering how little Steig has been recorded as a leader since the late '70s, this session should be of special interest to his fans".

== Track listing ==
1. "Outlaws" (Jeremy Steig, Eddie Gomez) − 7:11
2. "Autumn Comes / Autumn Leaves" (Steig, Gomez / Joseph Kosma) − 9:09
3. "Arioso" (Gomez) − 4:48
4. "Nightmare" (Steig) − 7:07
5. "Nardis" (Miles Davis) − 11:14

== Personnel ==
- Jeremy Steig – alto flute
- Eddie Gómez − bass
