= Mu-Tron III =

Envelope filter

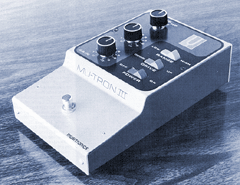
A Mu-tron III envelope filter

The Mu-Tron III is an envelope filter made by Musitronics Corporation. "The world's first envelope-controlled filter" was first made in 1972 by Mike Beigel and quickly became an essential effect for many funk musicians. It was produced again, in a modified version, in 2014.

== Mu-tron III ==
Extracting elements from one of the prototypes of a synthesizer he was developing for Guild Guitar Company, Mike Beigel based the Mu-Tron III, at the instigation of Guild engineer Aaron Newman, on a prototype called the Timbre Generator. The Mu-tron III could be used for any number of electric instruments. Beigel said he chose the envelope-controlled filter over other synthesizer elements, such as ring modulation, because it sounded more musical; it was a more general effect that would lend itself to a variety of applications, and it was easy to use.

The Mu-tron III was an instant success and was used by jazz/fusion guitarist Larry Coryell, Funkadelic bass player Bootsy Collins (for his "Space Bass"), guitarist Jerry Garcia, Yes bassist Chris Squire, and Stevie Wonder, who used it on his Clavinet for the song "Higher Ground".

Beigel was successfully granted a patent for the circuitry of the Mu-tron III. Musitronics licensed the Mu-tron III circuitry to a few different companies in the seventies – the Univox Funky Filter and Monacor Effectmatic are notable examples.

The original Mu-tron III ran on two 9V batteries used as a Bi Polar power supply; this gave it a wider dynamic range and more headroom compared to effects that ran on 9 volt. There was an optional power supply (the PS-1), and with later versions had built-in AC power supplies. The Mu-tron III used proprietary opto-isolators to control the filter, which was novel for the time, a method would also be used for the Mu-tron Phasor II and Bi-Phase. The state variable filter in the Mu-tron III allowed for low-pass, bandpass, and high-pass filter response, which could be triggered from low to high or vice versa. When ARP Instruments bought Musitronics in '79, they made the Mu-tron line for about a year before going out of business, and the Mu-tron III was no more. With the advent of the stompbox revival of the nineties, the Mu-tron III became one of the big-ticket items for collectors and players alike. There was a reissue of sorts, the HAZ Mu-tron III+, but Beigel says this (and other clones) did not have "the same magic".

In early 1995, however, Beigel did lend his expertise to Electro-Harmonix, creating an update of his original design, the Electro-Harmonix Q-Tron, and he also designed a Bi-Filter for E-H. Three other pedals, the Mini Q-Tron, Micro Q-Tron and Q-Tron+, are available from EHX as well, who now also offer the Bi-Filter, a modern version of Beigel Sound Lab's Envelope Controlled Filter, made in 1979. Michael Dregni, in Vintage Guitar, noted that none of the "clones, copycats, and other attempts to bring it back...sounded quite like the real deal". But in 2014, a renewed version of the Mu-Tron III, now called the Tru-Tron 3X, was made by Beigel's new company Mu-FX.

=== Tru-Tron 3X ===
The Tru-Tron can work "exactly like the original", but has added functionality and range, and is "smaller and more robust" than the original. It runs on 12 volts. In addition to the original's ability to control the upsweep of notes it adds control over the downsweep, and offers more gain for more intense effects. It also has an internal potentiometer which allows the user to adjust the envelope filter's response time to match the player's style.
