= Flute Fever =

Studio album by Jeremy Steig Quartet featuring Denny Zeitlin
- Released: 1964
- Recorded: October 23, 1963
- Studios: New York City, NY
- Genre: Jazz
- Length: 39:39
- Labels: Columbia; CL-2136/CS-8936
- Producer: John Hammond

Jeremy Steig chronology
Flute Fever (1964)	Jeremy & The Satyrs (1968)

Flute Fever is the debut album by American jazz flautist Jeremy Steig released on the Columbia label in 1964.

== Reception ==
Professional ratings
Review scores
Source	Rating
Allmusic	4.5/5 stars
All About Jazz	5/5 stars

In an All About Jazz review, Dan McLenaghan commented: "It's a blowing session—no group rehearsal, just some brief pre-recording discussions about how to approach some familiar tunes. But man, what a blowing session ... one of the finest jazz flute recordings to be found".

== Track listing ==
1. "Oleo" (Sonny Rollins) – 5:19
2. "Lover Man" (Jimmy Davis, Ram Ramirez, Jimmy Sherman) – 9:04
3. "What Is This Thing Called Love?" (Cole Porter) – 3:53
4. "So What" (Miles Davis) – 10:37
5. "Well, You Needn't" (Thelonious Monk) – 4:17
6. "Willow Weep for Me" (Ann Ronell) – 5:15
7. "Blue Seven" (Rollins) – 11:09
8. "What Is This Thing Called Love?" [Take 1] (Porter) – 3:17 Additional track on CD reissue

== Personnel ==
- Jeremy Steig – flute
- Denny Zeitlin – piano
- Ben Tucker − bass
- Ben Riley – drums
