= Jeremy Steig =

American jazz flautist (1942–2016)

- Born: September 23, 1942; New York City, U.S.
- Died: April 13, 2016 (aged 73) Yokohama, Japan
- Genres: Jazz; jazz-rock
- Occupation: Musician
- Instruments: flute (alto flute, bass flute, piccolo)
- Years active: 1963–2016
- Labels: Columbia/CBS Records; Capitol/EMI Records; CTI Records; Reprise/Warner Bros. Records; Solid State Records

Jeremy Steig (September 23, 1942 – April 13, 2016) was an American jazz flutist.

== Biography ==
Steig was born in Manhattan, the son of Jewish New Yorker cartoonist William Steig and Elizabeth (Mead) Steig, head of the fine arts department at Lesley College. Steig was a maternal nephew of Margaret Mead and Leo Rosten, and was also the cousin of Mary Catherine Bateson.

Steig began flute studies from age 11. He was taught by Page Brooks of the New York Philharmonic. By the age of 15, he was playing jazz professionally in Greenwich Village coffee houses. He came to the attention of music producer and critic John Henry Hammond, a Greenwich resident who would go on to produce Steig's debut album, Flute Fever (Steig consequently created the album's cover art).

In 1962, Steig was involved in a motorcycle accident which left his face paralyzed with loss of hearing in one ear. Despite an operation, the right side of his face was still partially paralyzed leaving him unable to play flute. He took up drawing and contemplated becoming a muralist where he could make a steady living. According to Steig, he took one "tortured" week to decide whether to be musician again. Upon deciding to become a musician full-time, he crafted a "blinder-like" mouthpiece which he inserted into his mouth to blow air. He relied on this device in order to play flute.

Steig also composed the music for animated film adaptations of his father's books for Weston Woods, including The Amazing Bone, Brave Irene and Sylvester and the Magic Pebble.

His song "Howlin' For Judy", from his 1970 album Legwork, was sampled in the Beastie Boys' 1994 single "Sure Shot", providing the main instrumental part of the song.

Steig performed the role of "The Pied Piper", exclusively on flute, in the film Shrek Forever After, based on the character created by his father.

He lived in Japan with his wife Asako. He died in Yokohama from cancer on April 13, 2016. Four years after his death, Byroad Press published his memoir, Get Me Out of Here, fulfilling his final wish. The book is illustrated with Jeremy's ink drawings and, at his request, contains three final chapters and an epilogue by Asako.

== Discography ==
=== As leader ===
- 1963: Flute Fever (Columbia) Quartet with Denny Zeitlin
- 1968: Jeremy & The Satyrs (Reprise)
- 1969: What’s New (Verve) with Bill Evans Trio
- 1969: This Is Jeremy Steig (Solid State)
- 1970: Legwork (Solid State)
- 1970: Wayfaring Stranger (Blue Note)
- 1970: Energy (Capitol)
- 1971: An Open Heart - Warriors Of The Rainbow (Akashic Records) with Fantazzi & Friends; a limited edition-private pressing release.
- 1974: Monium (Columbia) with Eddie Gómez
- 1975: Temple of Birth (Columbia) with Richard Beirach and Johnny Winter
- 1976: Leaving (Trio [Japan] Records; reissued on Storyville in 1988) with Richard Beirach
- 1976: Outlaws [live] (Enja) with Eddie Gómez
- 1977: Firefly (CTI)
- 1978: Lend Me Your Ears (Creative Music Productions/CMP) with Eddie Gómez and Joe Chambers
- 1979: Music for Flute & Double-Bass (CMP) with Eddie Gómez
- 1980: Rain Forest (CMP) with Eddie Gómez
- 1992: Jigsaw (Triloka)
- 2002: What's New at F (Tokuma [Japan] Records) with Eddie Gómez Quartet
- 2003: Jam (Steig-Gomez Records) with Eddie Gómez
- 2004: Improvised (Moonbeams Records)
- 2005: Flute On The Edge (Steig Music Company)
- 2007: Pterodactyl (Steig Music Company)
- 2021: Liberty (Steig Music Company)

=== Compilations and other appearances ===
- 1969: Jazz Wave, Ltd. - On Tour [live] (Blue Note) 2-LP set; various artists
- 1971: Portrait (United Artists) 2LP compilation of the albums: This Is Jeremy Steig, Legwork and Wayfaring Stranger.
- 1972: Fusion (Groove Merchant) 2-LP set; reissue of Energy, with a second album (=7 tracks) of previously unreleased material.
- 1973: Mama Kuku [live] (MPS/BASF Records) with Association P.C.
- 1974: Flute Summit - Jamming At Donaueschingen Music Festival (Atlantic) with James Moody, Sahib Shihab, Chris Hinze
- 2008: Howlin' For Judy (Blue Note's "Rare Grooves" series) CD compilation of the albums: Legwork and Wayfaring Stranger.

=== As sideman ===
With Walter Davis Jr. Trio

- Illumination (Denon [Japan] Records, 1977)

With Tommy Bolin

- From The Archives - Vol. 1 (Rhino Records, 1996) a collection of "grade-A" previously unreleased "rock-jazz-fusion" material.
- From The Archives - Volume 2 (Zebra Records, 1998) another collection of previously unreleased material; even better than the first volume.

With Hank Crawford

- Hank Crawford's Back (Kudu, 1976)
- Tico Rico (Kudu/CTI, 1977)

With Art Farmer

- Crawl Space (CTI, 1977)

With Urbie Green

- The Fox (CTI, 1976)

With Mike Mainieri

- Journey Thru an Electric Tube (Solid State, 1968)

With Idris Muhammad

- Turn This Mutha Out (Kudu/CTI, 1977)
- Boogie To The Top (Kudu/CTI, 1978)

With Lalo Schifrin

- Towering Toccata (CTI, 1976)

With Peter Walker

- Rainy Day Raga (Vanguard, 1966)

With Johnny Winter

- Still Alive and Well (Columbia, 1973)
- Saints & Sinners (Columbia, 1974) note: Jeremy plays on "Dirty", a previously unreleased instrumental track recorded for but left-off the original album release; it is included on the CD reissue.

With Paul Winter Sextet

- Jazz Meets The Folk Song (Columbia, 1964)

With Montreal

- A Summer's Night (Stormy Forest, 1970)
