= Control mastery theory =

Control mastery theory or CMT is an integrative theory of how psychotherapy works, that draws on psychodynamic, relational and cognitive principles. Originally the theory was developed within a psychoanalytical framework, by psychoanalyst and researcher Joseph Weiss, MD (1924-2004). CMT is also a theory of how the mind operates, with an emphasis of the unconscious, and how psychological problems may develop based on traumatic experiences early in life. The name of the theory comes from two central premises; the assumption that people have control over their mental content, and the belief that patients who come to therapy are fundamentally motivated to master their lives.

== History ==
The one-page article, "Crying at the Happy Ending" (Weiss, 1952), has been considered to mark the point where Weiss began to formulate the ideas underlying CMT. In this short article he described the phenomenon of delay of affect, where an emotion that connects to a particular upsetting situation is warded off until the situation has passed, and it is perceived safe to release the emotion. Following this, Weiss turned to focus on how patients make progress in therapy. Through studying detailed process notes of psychotherapy sessions, he identified segments thought to mark therapeutic progress, and looked at what immediately preceded such instances. Progress within sessions was defined as the emergence of new material or behavior. He concluded that patients make progress in therapy when they feel safe in the therapeutic relationship, and that patients continually make appraisals of conditions of safety in relation to others. Some of the ideas that helped form CMT were mentioned in certain passages of Freud's later writings, but the basic concepts of the theory were developed through Weiss's study of psychotherapy notes. In 1965, Weiss was joined by Harold Sampson, PhD (1925-2015). They met daily to collaborate on researching Weiss' theories. Formal research on the theory began in 1972 when Joseph Weiss together with Harold Sampson founded the Mount Zion Psychotherapy Research Group (now known as the San Francisco Psychotherapy Research Group; SFPRG). This research was based on the assumption that while therapeutic processes will be case-specific, there are also some common and lawful principles that govern how psychotherapy works, or fails to work. In 2017 an additional group was formed called the International Control Mastery Therapy Center (CMTC) whose goal is to help disseminate the theories of CMT worldwide (see CMTCenter.Net).

== Core principles ==
=== Psychopathology stems from pathogenic beliefs that have developed from traumatic experiences ===
According to CMT, psychological problems (of non-biological origin) largely come from pathogenic beliefs that have developed as a result of traumatic experiences, typically occurring in childhood. Trauma in CMT is broadly defined as experiences that impair a person's normal growth and development, with an emphasis on interpersonal experiences. Pathogenic beliefs are intrapsychic structures of distorted ideas of the self in relation to the world. These beliefs hold the patient back because they suggest pursuing developmentally normal and healthy life goals will result in terrible consequences for one self or loved ones. Pathogenic beliefs are often unconscious, but deeply rooted, and associated with negative emotions such as anxiety or guilt. Though the pathogenic beliefs in themselves may be irrational, exaggerated or incorrect, CMT holds that they are generally based on real experiences. The traumas underlying these beliefs could either be "shock traumas" or "stress traumas". Shock traumas are sudden and dramatic single events that are perceived as frightening and overwhelming, while stress traumas are repetitive events that over time create strain.

In further explaining how pathogenic beliefs develop, CMT starts with the assumption that humans through evolution are geared towards adaptation. In agreement with attachment theory, CMT acknowledges that the young child is dependent on the family for survival and emotional security, and therefore highly motivated to adapt to the family environment and maintain emotional bonds to significant others. Further, in alignment with findings from infant research, CMT assumes that children from infancy start forming and testing hypotheses about the world. As a result of this adaptive process they infer beliefs about themselves, others and their environment. However, since children have limited life experience, and not fully developed cognitive abilities, they sometimes draw false conclusions. Difficulties with understanding and interpreting traumatic experiences could result in the formation of pathogenic beliefs. Further, a core principle in CMT is the notion that behavior is thought to be regulated by perceptions of safety versus danger. When traumatic events or interchanges occur, children will attempt to understand what caused the event and what they might do to avoid it. Therefore, another component thought to be important for the formation of pathogenic beliefs, is the unconscious need to maintain a feeling of safety. For example, a child who has been abused by a caregiver might infer that the abuse happened because of something they themselves did, and that it was deserved. This belief might make them feel safer than assuming their caregiver is unpredictable and dangerous. If such experiences persist, the child might internalize a pathogenic belief that they are bad, and deserve to be mistreated. Though most pathogenic beliefs come from attempts at adaptation, they ultimately become maladaptive, as they inflict suffering and hinder the person from pursuing important life goals. Pathogenic beliefs may also develop after traumatic experiences in adulthood, but children are generally viewed as more vulnerable because of their cognitive level, and their dependence on others.

In CMT, children are understood to be intensely loyal to their parents, and also driven by prosocial concern for the well-being of their family members. For these reasons, pathogenic beliefs resulting from traumatic experiences with significant others is thought to have a moral component. They are not only beliefs about how things actually operate in the world, but also about how things morally should be. The interpersonal manifestations of pathogenic beliefs, where the patient repeats negative experiences from childhood, are called compliances and pathogenic identifications. A compliance would be when a person thinks that the way he or she was mistreated as a child, is the correct way he or she should be treated. A pathogenic identification would be when a person repeats the traumatizing behaviors of a parent, and believes it is morally correct to treat others in this way.

=== Patients are motivated and have a plan for the therapy ===
CMT posits that patients who come to therapy are motivated to master their trauma, and overcome their pathogenic beliefs. In addition, it is thought that the patient has an unconscious plan for how they will get better, which involves how they will test pathogenic beliefs with the therapist. The most important task of the therapist is to create conditions of safety to allow the patient to carry on with their plan, and react to the patient in ways that will help disconfirm their pathogenic beliefs. Interventions that are successful in achieving this are called pro-plan, while interventions that the patient perceive as confirming a pathogenic belief are considered anti-plan and a hindrance to therapeutic progress. Weiss described that there are three primary ways pathogenic beliefs may become disconfirmed or less powerful; 1) by use of the therapeutic relationship in itself, 2) by gaining insight through interpretations that help disconfirm such beliefs, or 3) when the patient tests a pathogenic belief directly with the therapist, and the therapist reacts in a way that help disconfirm the belief (passes the test).

=== Treatment by attitudes ===
Interpersonal relationships are seen as inherently transformative in CMT, and the therapeutic relationship is seen as a context where the patient is motivated and change is likely to occur under the right conditions. It is held that the therapeutic relationship in itself may help patients overcome pathogenic beliefs, through what is called treatment by attitude. Therapists are assumed to consciously and unconsciously convey attitudes about the patient through their actions, words, silences, mannerisms, and affective responses or the lack of them. Similarly, the patient is assumed to be especially attentive, both consciously and unconsciously, toward therapist attitudes that relate to their own goals and pathogenic beliefs. It is believed that the therapeutic relationship may be transformative when the patient feels safe in the relationship, and perceives the therapist's attitudes toward them as disconfirming a pathogenic belief. Treatment by attitude may be planned according to the therapist's understanding of the patient's history and psychology, or happen spontaneously and outside the conscious awareness of either participant. The concept of treatment by attitudes can be likened to the concept of the corrective emotional experience described by Alexander and French in 1946, but there are some differences. In CMT, the therapeutic work is viewed more as a collaborative effort. CMT underlines that patients play an active role in seeking out experiences that will lead to progress, and coach the therapists in how to help them.

=== Patients coach the therapist ===
The concept of coaching is unique to CMT, and refers to patient behaviors and communications designed to attune the therapist to the patient's conscious and unconscious goals, and how best to address the patient's issues. Through coaching the therapist, the patient informs and guides the therapist in how to most efficiently support them in carrying out their plan for treatment. Coaching behaviors are thought to be most prevalent at the beginning of therapy, as well as before, during and after presenting important tests to the therapist. Also, coaching may be used to alter the therapeutic relationship, for example when patients want to change their strategy for disconfirming pathogenic beliefs.

=== Patients test the therapist ===
The concept of testing in CMT has been described as a transference phenomenon. When testing the therapist, the patient recreates previous interpersonal experiences in the therapeutic relationship, hoping to gain new emotional experiences or insight that will help disconfirm pathogenic beliefs. A test is a sort of trial action a patient initiates with the purpose of checking the validity of a pathogenic belief. It can happen in a discrete episode, or as part of an ongoing process in the therapy. Normally testing is thought to happen outside of the patient's conscious awareness. If the therapist responds to a test in a way that is helpful in challenging the patient's pathogenic belief, this is called passing the test. The therapist needs to observe the patient's behavior and emotional reactions in order to understand if they have passed or failed a test. Research on CMT support the assumption that patients will access new material and be more relaxed and friendly after passed tests, while failed tests may lead to patients feeling insecure and defensive. There are two categories of testing strategies in CMT; transference tests and passive-into-active tests. In a transference test, the patient will behave in ways that he or she has experienced to elicit traumatizing responses from significant others in the past. For example, if the patient experienced that a parent diminished his or her accomplishments growing up, they may have a pathogenic belief that displaying pride will threaten others. To test this belief, they may either put themselves down in the hope that the therapist will disagree, or alternatively display pride in the hope that the therapist will be able to share the joy and not reject such behavior. If the therapist in this example would respond in a supportive manner when the patient shows pride, they are likely to pass the test and make the patient feel at ease and move in the direction of discarding the pathogenic belief. Conversely, if the therapist perceives the patient as bragging and reacts negatively or with silence, they might fail the test and thereby hinder the patient in making progress. The other strategy of testing, passive-into-active tests, involve patients themselves repeating behaviors that once traumatized them, in the hope that the therapist will not be equally overwhelmed. If the therapist tolerates this, and is successful in modeling a way of handling this behavior without losing integrity, they are likely to pass the test. If the therapist gives signs of being traumatized by the patient, it is likely that the patient will have difficulty believing the therapy will help them. The phenomenon of turning passive into active was first described by Freud, but has been given increased attention and significance in CMT.

=== The role of unconscious guilt ===
The concept of unconscious guilt is important in CMT. It relates to the view that humans are essentially prosocial beings from childhood and onwards, and loyal to the family in particular. In dysfunctional families, this prosocial instinct may contribute to feelings of irrational guilt over having caused trouble, or failed to fix the family's problem. In contrast to the traditional psychoanalytical view of guilt, where guilt is understood as resulting from an unconscious aggressive instinct or wish to harm others, CMT sees guilt as derived from altruism. Guilt is thereby defined as a painful emotion arising from a belief that one has harmed others, designed to protect attachments. From this understanding, guilt can be seen as adaptive when it serves to encourage good conduct and maintain relational bonds. But when guilt is exaggerated, irrational, generalized or repeatedly linked to shame it becomes maladaptive. Different types of unconscious guilt have been outlined within CMT, and two types that have been held up as especially important are survivor guilt and separation guilt. They both involve an exaggerated sense of responsibility for the welfare of others. Survivor guilt arises from perceiving oneself to be better off than a loved one, and relates to the irrational idea that there is a fixed amount of happiness to go around. Thereby one can imagine that one's success comes at the expense of someone else, and feel it is unfair or undeserved. Survivor guilt can also be literal, and arise after the death of a loved one. Separation guilt has by some been described as developmental guilt, as it relates to the belief that one will hurt loved ones by growing up, individualizing and becoming different from the family. CMT describes unconscious guilt as closely intertwined with pathogenic beliefs, and guilt is assumed to play an important role in patients' transference reactions.

== Research ==
The development of CMT has been driven forward by an interplay between clinical observations, theory development and empirical research. Some of this research has been psychotherapy research, and in other studies predictions from CMT have been tested or explored outside of the therapeutic setting.

=== Psychotherapy research ===
Most of the psychotherapy research has been carried out on completed therapies which were recorded and transcribed, and where neither the therapist nor the patient was familiar with the theory. The goal has been to investigate how psychotherapy works regardless of the therapist's orientation or approach. The main tool for studying and evaluating these psychotherapies has been the case formulation. CMT researchers have attempted to operationalize the clinical process of understanding a case, in order to assess and increase agreement between different clinical judges adhering to CMT.

The first attempt to assess whether it was possible for trained judges to formulate reliable case formulations based on CMT were done by Caston (1986). In several studies applying this procedure on brief therapies, the interjudge reliabilities were found to be high, typically between .7 and .9. Curtis and Silberschatz later modified and revised the procedure, and termed it the Plan Formulation Method (1991).

The Plan Formulation Method, or PFM, is a comprehensive case formulation method that was developed primarily for clinical research on CMT. Plan formulations developed for psychotherapy research are based on reviews of transcripts from early therapy sessions. A plan formulation starts with a description of the patient, including his or her current life circumstances and presenting complaints. Beyond that, a control mastery plan formulation consists of the following elements:

- Traumas: Experiences that may have led to the development of pathogenic beliefs.
- Goals: The patient's conscious and unconscious goals for therapy.
- Obstructions: Pathogenic beliefs that are inhibiting the patient from attaining or pursuing his or her goals.
- Tests: Ways in which the patient is likely to work in therapy to check the validity of pathogenic beliefs.
- Insights: Information that may be helpful to the patient in order to disprove pathogenic beliefs and overcome obstructions.

Research on the PFM has consistently demonstrated that trained independent judges can achieve a high degree of agreement in formulating case formulations based on CMT concepts, including traumas, goals, obstructions, tests and insights. A large body of research support that patients bring out new material when they feel safe in the therapeutic relationship, and that patients make progress when therapist's passes tests or make plan-compatible interpretations, that help contradict pathogenic beliefs. When analyzing recorded therapies, trained judges reliably agree on when in a session a patient is testing the therapist, and whether or not the therapist's response fails or passes the test.

=== Other CMT research ===
A measure called the Interpersonal Guilt Questionnaire (IGQ) has been developed to assess patients' types and levels of guilt, and how they relate to each other. An empirical study using this questionnaire demonstrated a connection between guilt and traumatic childhood experiences, and also between guilt and psychopathology.

== Clinical application ==
CMT is not a school of therapy per se, and does not clearly define a set of therapeutic techniques. Rather, CMT may be said to be more of a theoretical framework used to formulate cases and guide the therapist's approach to treatment. The CMT plan formulation is an important clinical tool in this respect. It is considered a working hypothesis that provides predictions about how patients will react to interventions in therapy, which is continually revised as more information becomes apparent. In CMT-informed treatment the therapeutic interventions will be case-specific, meaning that interventions will be tailored to the plan formulation developed for the patient, in contrast to being diagnosis-specific. The idea is that patients with similar presenting problems may have different underlying traumas, and that the therapist's interventions will only be successful to the degree that it may help patients overcome their unique pathogenic beliefs. Clinical applications of the theory have been explored with a range of different target populations and problems. For example, there have been written articles on CMT-informed clinical work with couples, families, children, trauma survivors, and individuals with depression and addiction.

== Theoretical integration and similarities ==
CMT was primarily developed through an empirical approach, and not through gradually assimilating concepts from other theories. Joseph Weiss developed several hypotheses of how psychotherapy works through his study of psychotherapy notes, which have since been tested and refined. However, it is clear that the concepts of CMT are similar to ideas developed within many different fields of psychology.

CMT's psychodynamic roots are evident in the emphasis on the unconscious life. Weiss (1993) wrote that CMT could be viewed as an object relations theory, and is closely related to Heinz Kohut's self psychology, as these theories have in common the focus on how problems often arise in early experiences with significant others.

The understanding of how the child observes the world, represents events, and infers cause and effect corresponds with theory and research from developmental psychology and cognitive psychology, such as Daniel Stern's infant research, John Bowlby's attachment theory, and Piaget's theory of cognitive development. Pathogenic beliefs may also be compared to the cognitive concept of schemas developed by Aaron T. Beck and used in schema therapy. Some have also pointed out that CMT has similarities with humanistic psychology in the non-pathologizing, client-centered approach and shared focus on mastery.

== Criticisms ==
CMT might be subjected to some of the same general criticisms directed toward other similar theories. For example, a common feminist critique of traditional object relations theories is the claim that such theories tend to "blame the mother" for a child's negative development. Although CMT has a strong focus on the role of early childhood experiences, it is also open to the idea that pathogenic beliefs can arise in adulthood. Further, CMT does not hold that pathogenic beliefs only develop in dysfunctional families; other kinds of traumatic events could also contribute, as well as how children interpret events based on their developmental level.

In a review of Silberschatz's book on CMT, Transformative Relationships (2005), Les Greenberg noted that CMT seems to focus heavily on the concept of unconscious guilt. Greenberg praised the book overall, but cautioned that although CMT claims to prescribe a case-specific approach to psychological treatment, it will be difficult to make observations completely independent of the theory, and that certain concepts such as guilt may thereby be given too much weight overall.

Nancy McWilliams has claimed that some pathogenic beliefs will be too complex to capture in a single statement. Further, McWilliams underlined that passing tests may not be enough to change the underlying pathogenic beliefs in itself, if the client does not yet have an understanding of how the beliefs came to develop, or gained understanding of what goes on in the transference.

In an article published in journal of the Norwegian Psychological Association, Binder and Holgersen (2008) raised the question of whether the semantics in the concept of the patient's "plan" may attribute too much rationality and linearity to the unconscious. Further, as CMT draws on research and theory from different traditions within psychology, they pointed to the challenge in integrating research and theory into a cohesive and easily testable whole.

Finally, it has been argued that CMT builds on inherently western values, and that there may be a need for more careful consideration of cultural factors when developing plan formulations.
