= Clavinet =

Electric keyboard instrument

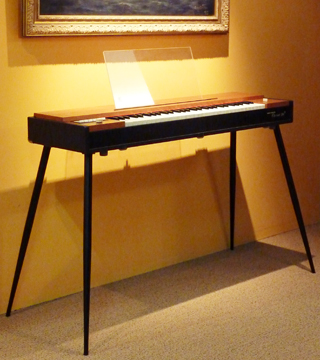

Keyboard instrument
- Other names: Clav, Clavi
- Classification: Keyboard; Chordophone; Electric piano

Playing range
- F1–E6

Related instruments
- Cembalet, Pianet, Duo, clavichord

Builders
- Hohner

The Clavinet is an electric clavichord invented by Ernst Zacharias and manufactured by the Hohner company of Trossingen, West Germany, from 1964 to 1982. The instrument produces sounds with rubber pads, each matching one of the keys and responding to a keystroke by striking a given point on a tensioned string, and was designed to resemble the Renaissance-era clavichord.

Although originally intended for home use, the Clavinet became popular on stage, and could be used to create electric guitar sounds on a keyboard. It is strongly associated with the musician Stevie Wonder, who used the instrument extensively, particularly on his 1972 hit "Superstition", and was regularly featured in rock, funk and reggae music throughout the 1960s and 1970s. Modern digital keyboards can emulate the Clavinet sound, but there is also a grass-roots industry of repairers who continue to maintain the instrument.

== Description ==
Parts of a Clavinet. 1. Tuning 2. Damper 3. Tangent 4. Anvil 5. Key 6. String 7. Pickup 8. Tailpiece

A Hohner Clavinet played through effects units and an amplifier

The Clavinet is an electromechanical instrument that is usually used in conjunction with a keyboard amplifier. Most models have 60 keys ranging from F1 to E6.

The sound is produced by a harp of 60 tensioned steel strings placed diagonally below the key surface. Each key pivots on a fulcrum point at the rear, with a spring to return it. Beneath each key, a metal holder grips a small rubber pad. Pressing a key forces the pad to fret the string like a hammer on on a guitar. An electro-magnetic pickup turns the string vibration into an electric current. The feel of a clavinet comes from the impact of the pad striking its anvil point against the string. This makes the keyboard weighted which allows a different volume for each note like a piano and clavichord, along with aftertouch as the string is stretched.

The end of each string farthest from the pick-ups passes through a weave of yarn, which damps the vibrating string after a key is released. Each string is tuned by a machine-head positioned along the front of the harp. This harp mechanism is different from the other Hohner keyboard instruments, the Cembalet and Pianet, which have pads plucking metal reeds. Most clavinets have two sets of pickups encased in epoxy in a plastic case, positioned above and below the strings. These are conceptually similar to a neck and bridge pickup on a guitar. The Clavinet has pickup selector switches, and a solid state preamplifier that allows a line level output to be fed to an amplifier. The volume of the preamplifier can be set by a control to the left of the keyboard.

== Background ==
The Clavinet was designed by German engineer Ernst Zacharias. He grew up listening to Bach harpsichord music, which led him to design a comparable modern instrument. He joined Hohner in 1954, at a time when it was struggling with manufacturing after the company factories had been seized by the Nazis during World War II.

Zacharias revitalised the company's product range, introducing the Cembalet and Pianet. He was particularly interested in producing an electric clavichord, and discovered that striking a hammer tip across a string mounted on an anvil allowed the player to hit the keys more forcefully and gain greater volume. He was interested in using metal keypads and plastic keys as an alternative to wooden frames and action that had been used on electric pianos such as the Wurlitzer. The first prototype model, the Claviphon, was manufactured in 1961. It used the string harp found on later production models, with a Pianet keyboard.

== Models ==
Seven different models of the Clavinet were produced from 1964 to 1982. Originally, Hohner intended the instrument for home use and for late Medieval, Baroque and early classical music. The changes reflected Hohner's transition from marketing it as a home instrument to one that was practical to play on stage. Around 38,000 units were manufactured in total.

=== 1960s ===
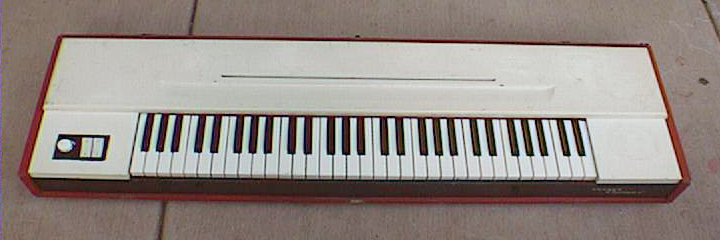
The Clavinet C

The Clavinet I was the first model to be introduced in 1964. It is housed in a heavy brown teak veneer box with a bronze front panel stating the model number, covering the tuning pegs on the front. The panel can be removed with two thumb screws in order to tune the instrument with a rectangular case profile. A lockable lid can be folded over the keyboard when the instrument is not being played. The instrument is supported by four wooden legs fitted to the main body by threaded knobs, and secured with a crossbar brace. There is a built-in battery-powered speaker and amplifier, but there also the option to use an external amplifier via a jack socket. The only controls on the Clavinet I are volume and two tablet switches that selected a relevant combination of pickups. A bent rod music stand pegs into two holes on the upper surface. This model was designed and marketed as a home model for Baroque music. Early advertisements from Hohner featured the instrument in such a setting.

The Clavinet II had the same basic features as the Clavinet I, which replaced the built-in amplifier and speaker system with a preamplifier. It was the first model to support changing the instrument's tone via rocker switches.

The Clavinet C was introduced in 1968. It has a slimmer case than the I or II, and is finished in red vinyl, which was popular with contemporary combo organs at the time. A removable black aluminium panel below the keys provides access to the tuning machines. The upper surface of the keyboard is finished in white, and a slot holds an acrylic panel music rest, with the Hohner logo. Four black tapered tubular steel legs are threaded into mounts on the underside of the case. The legs fit into a box section under the top surface for transport. A removable transport lid fastens over the keyboard and controls. As well as mains power, the instrument could be driven off a 9V battery. A rare variant of the C, known as the Echolette Beat Spinett featured reverse-colour keys like a traditional harpsichord, and an integrated ashtray.

The Clavinet L was also introduced in 1968. This was a domestic model with a trapezoid-shaped case and three wooden legs. The keyboard has reverse-colour keys, and a clear plastic music stand. It has a built-in amplifier and speaker which run off four 1.5V batteries. This model was designed to resemble a typical Renaissance-era keyboard.

=== 1970s ===
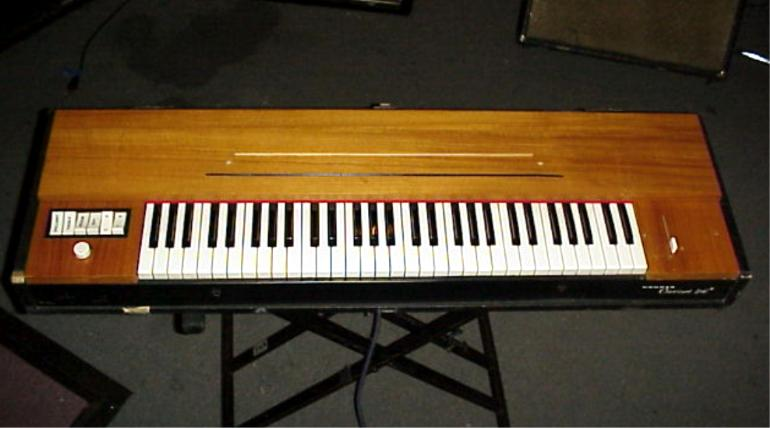
The Clavinet D6, the most popular model, was introduced in 1971.

The Clavinet D6, introduced in 1971, continued the case style of the C but is covered in black vinyl leathercloth and the upper surface of the instrument is teak veneer, which was cheaper to manufacture. The instrument came with a removable lid used for transporting, which also had space to store the music stand. The D6 allowed a more versatile sound election, which could be selected by six rocker switches to the left of the keyboard. The left four switches are concerned with tone; "Brilliant" and "Treble" activate a high-pass filter, while "Medium" and "Soft" activate a low-pass filter. The two right switches are marked "AB" and "CD" and control which pickups are selected. On the right was a mechanical mute slider.

The final E7 and Clavinet Duo models reflected several engineering improvements to make the instrument more suitable for loud stage use, including improved shielding to avoid electrical noise. The E7 was introduced in 1979. It has a black vinyl leather cloth covered case with a rectangular profile with rounded corners and a removable metal lid to protect the keys and control surface for transport. The control panels at the left hand end of the instrument include those found on a D6 along with a sliding volume control. It included support brackets so it could be mounted on the rounded top of a Rhodes Piano, a popular combination of keyboards at the time. A number of D6-labeled instruments were made in the E7-style case and include D6 logos on the control panel and the removable tuning cover. These are known as D6-N models, the "N" denoting "new".

The Clavinet Duo model was first produced in 1978. It combined a clavinet with the Hohner Pianet T in one compact, albeit heavy, instrument. A foot switch allows the player to switch between clavinet, pianet, or a mixture or the two. There is also a "split keyboard" mode that allows either instrument to be used in a particular range of notes. There is a stereo output jack, that allows either a mix of the two sounds or each individual sound on one half of the stereo channel. It used a black case in the style of a Clavinet E7.

By the time the E7 and Clavinet Duo were being produced, polyphonic synthesizers had become popular, and electromechanical keyboards were beginning to fall out of fashion. The final models were manufactured in 1982.

=== Later models ===
After Hohner stopped producing electro-mechanical Clavinets, they used the brand name for electronic and digital keyboards. The "Clavinet DP" was applied to a range of digital pianos. Though Zacharias approved of the instrument, they were designed for the home market, and made no attempt to emulate the original.

== Effects ==
The Castle Bar is an aftermarket device invented by Buddy Castle in the mid-1970s that connects the strings to a rotating bridge, which is fixed to a rod on top of the instrument. This makes it possible to bend the pitch, in a similar manner to a tremolo arm on a guitar, by pressing the rod. The Clavinet can then be used in a very different manner, and it makes it a suitable lead instrument. There are upgraded reissues of the device available which are more reliable than the original.

The Clavinet is often played through a wah wah pedal or fed through an auto wah box. This is a particularly popular setup when playing funk. Other suitable stomp boxes that can be used with a Clavinet include phaser or chorus.

== Maintenance ==
The early Clavinet I and II models were not designed for stage use, and would easily cause audio feedback if plugged into a loud amplifier. Later models such as the D6 resolved this issue with better string damping. The pickups are unshielded, which increases the likelihood of picking up interference from nearby lights, switches and transformers.

Over time, the rubber hammer tips deteriorated, resulting in the key no longer functioning properly. The strings can last longer than those on a guitar, as they are sealed instruments and not prone to oil and sweat from fingers. The keys are not the same as any other Hohner instrument, and replacement is only possible by taking them from a similar model.

In the 1980s and 1990s replacement parts for clavinets became harder to find, as Hohner had ceased to support them, and the price for second-hand models dropped. In 1999, Clavinet enthusiast Aaron Kipness established the website clavinet.com, and started manufacturing replacement hammer tips with his stepfather. The website quickly became popular with worldwide orders for replacement parts. Subsequently, Hohner asked Kipness if he would be interested in buying all remaining stock. The website encouraged other people to begin to manufacture spares, and there is now a cottage industry around keeping the Clavinet in playing condition. In 2018, a Clavinet in pristine condition could sell for about $2,000.

== Clones ==
Though some musicians insist on using a real Clavinet, many modern keyboards provide a suitable emulation. The Nord Stage features the various pickup switch combinations, but not the mute slider. Ticky Clav 2 is a software emulation of the instrument, providing all the features found on the original boards.

== Notable users ==
=== Stevie Wonder ===
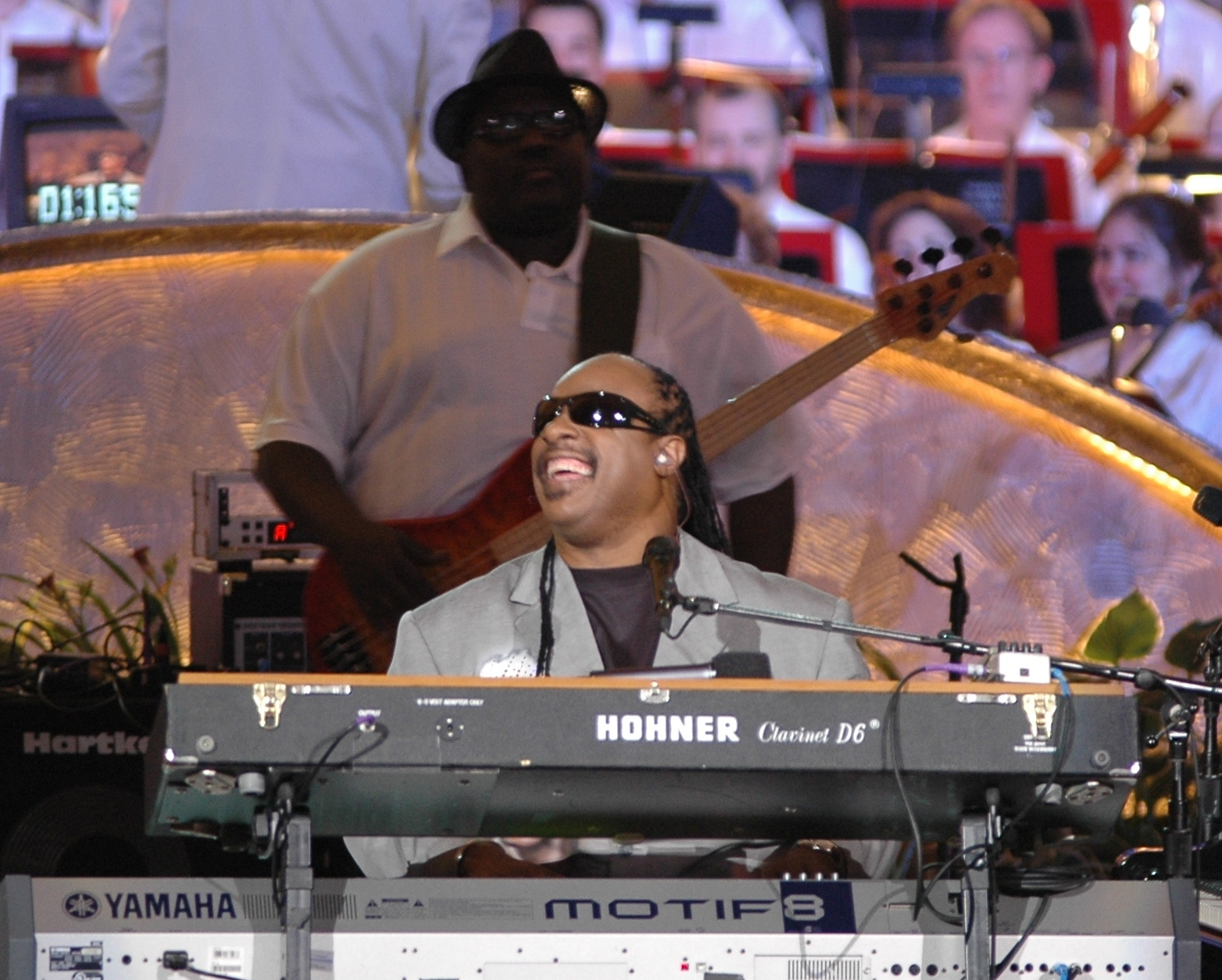
Stevie Wonder playing a Clavinet D6 in 2006

The Clavinet is strongly associated with Stevie Wonder, particularly his 1972 number-one hit "Superstition", where it provides the main riff and accompaniment to the song. The track features multiple Clavinet C overdubs, and requires Wonder and another keyboardist to play on two Clavinets simultaneously to recreate the arrangement in live performances. Wonder began to use Clavinets in the late 1960s, when he was looking for a keyboard that could play guitar-like sounds. He first used it on "Shoo-Be-Doo-Be-Doo-Da-Day" (1968). As well as "Superstition", other tracks such as "Higher Ground" are led by the Clavinet played through a Mu-Tron III filter pedal, and the album Talking Book makes prominent use of the instrument. The track "Sweet Little Girl" (on 1972's Music of My Mind) features the line "You know your baby loves you, more than I love my Clavinet".

By the 1970s, Hohner began to use photos of Wonder in their advertising. He has continued to record and tour with the Clavinet into the 21st century, and has several models. His main stage instrument is a customised D6 with modified preamps and high-quality film capacitors. The D6 is powered by a 9V battery instead of mains power, as it avoids ground loops and associated noise.

=== Others ===
In 1975, keyboardist Dave MacRae played the clavinet on Bill Oddie's song "The Funky Gibbon" performed by The Goodies. Oddie recalled that MacRae's playing had a "very Stevie Wonder-type feel to it ... And then I literally started whacking the top of the grand piano. So the actual rhythm-track of 'The Funky Gibbon' has only got me and Dave on it."

The Clavinet was used in funk music, often played through a wah-wah pedal. It can be heard on Bill Withers' "Use Me" and Funkadelic's "A Joyful Process". Billy Preston used a Clavinet on several songs, such as his own "Outa-Space" (1972) and the Rolling Stones' "Doo Doo Doo Doo Doo (Heartbreaker)" (1973). Herbie Hancock featured the Clavinet prominently on the albums Head Hunters (1973) and Man-Child (1975), and both he and Chick Corea regularly played the instrument.

The first reggae recording to feature the Clavinet was the Termites' "Attractive Girl" (1967). Bob Marley and the Wailers' "Could You Be Loved" (1980) is driven by a Clavinet riff played by Earl Lindo, as is Wonder's Marley-influenced track "Master Blaster (Jammin')", played by Wonder himself.

The Band's Garth Hudson played a Clavinet fed through a wah-wah pedal on "Up on Cripple Creek" (1969). Keith Emerson played the instrument on Emerson, Lake & Palmer's cover of "Nut Rocker", heard on 1971's Pictures at an Exhibition. George Duke regularly used a Clavinet when playing with Frank Zappa and solo, using the Castle Bar modification. Peter Hammill used the Clavinet as his main keyboard instrument on Van der Graaf Generator's Godbluff (1975). Led Zeppelin's John Paul Jones played a Clavinet on "Trampled Under Foot", as did Daryl Dragon on Captain & Tennille's "Love Will Keep Us Together"(both 1975). Late seventies hit singles to feature a Clavinet include Steely Dan's "Kid Charlemagne" and Fleetwood Mac's "You Make Loving Fun".

Lachy Doley uses the Clavinet (with the Castle Bar modification, similar to a guitar's whammy bar) as one of his main instruments. His YouTube videos showing him use the mod's tremolo arm have gone viral. He bought his first Clavinet second-hand aged 17 for $150; the modification had already been made at the time he bought this. The signal from the Clavinet is fed into a Dunlop Cry Baby wah-wah pedal, then into a Fender Deville amplifier.
