= Energy (Jeremy Steig album) =

Studio album by Jeremy Steig
- Released: 1971
- Recorded: 1970
- Studio: Electric Lady Studios, New York City, NY
- Genre: Jazz; jazz-rock
- Length: 39:39
- Label: Capitol; SM/ST 662
- Producer: Sonny Lester

Jeremy Steig chronology
Wayfaring Stranger (1970)	Energy (1971)	Fusion (1972)

Energy is an album by American jazz flautist Jeremy Steig released on the Capitol label in 1971.

== Reception ==
Professional ratings
Review scores
Source	Rating
Allmusic	4.5/5 stars

Allmusic's Jason Ankeny said: "Energy is a miracle of alchemy. Jeremy Steig transforms his flute from the ethereal to the elemental, forging a heavy, deeply funky jazz-rock record that defies gravity ... Steig creates Technicolor grooves that float like butterflies and sting like bees. His music doesn't so much fuse jazz and rock as it approaches each side from the perspective of the other, exploring their respective concepts and executions to arrive at a sound all its own. If anything, the tonal restrictions of Steig's chosen instrument push him even farther into the unknown, employing a series of acoustic and electronic innovations to expand the flute's possibilities seemingly into the infinite".

== Track listing ==
All compositions by Jan Hammer and Jeremy Steig except where noted

1. "Home" − 4:39
2. "Cakes" − 4:52
3. "Swamp Carol" − 4:11
4. "Energy" (Hammer, Steig, Don Alias, Gene Perla) − 4:50
5. "Down Stretch" (Hammer) − 4:14
6. "Give Me Some" − 6:47
7. "Come with Me" − 8:02
8. "Dance of the Mind" (Alias, Steig) − 2:22

== Personnel ==
- Jeremy Steig – flute, alto flute, bass flute, piccolo
- Jan Hammer − electric piano, Chinese gong
- Gene Perla − electric bass, electric upright bass
- Don Alias – drums, congas, clap drums, percussion
- Eddie Gómez − electric upright bass (tracks 5 & 7)

Technical

- Edwin H. Kramer - engineer
- Sonny Lester - executive producer
