= Auto-wah =

Audio filter effect

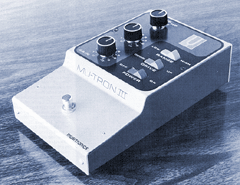
A Mu-tron III envelope filter

Auto-wah is a type of wah-wah effects pedal typically used with electric guitar, bass guitar, clavinet, and electric piano etc. The distinctive choppy rhythm guitar sound on many funk and disco recordings from the 1970s popularized the effect.

== Terminology ==
The effect is also known as a "Q-wah", "T-wah", "envelope following filter", "envelope follower" or "envelope filter".

== Operation ==
Instead of the effect being controlled by a foot-operated treadle pedal, as on a standard wah-wah, the effect alters in response to the volume of the input signal. Like a wah, it works by adjusting the central frequency of a peaking filter, which amplifies a specific frequency and cuts off other selected frequencies. Since the electronic circuits in the effect can respond much faster than a human musician can physically move a pedal, certain effects that a standard wah cannot achieve are only possible with auto-wah. The response of the effect is highly interactive with the dynamics of the input signal - this makes it possible to vary the response at will via slight adjustments to playing technique. Therefore, it may take some practice before the response of the auto-wah can be wilfully controlled in order to achieve a consistent sound.

A typical auto-wah circuit uses an envelope detector to produce a voltage representing the overall volume of the input. This signal is then used to sweep the cutoff frequency of a filter. The filter usually has a low-pass or bandpass response. The Boss AW-3 is an example of such a device.

There is a variant of auto-wah that utilizes a low-frequency oscillator (LFO) instead of an envelope detector to alter the effect. The filter response varies constantly with time and is not linked to playing dynamics. The Boss AW-2 is an example of such a device. The difference in sound is subtle, but careful listeners will notice the constant period of the filter sweep. The song "Falling Into Grace" by the Red Hot Chili Peppers is an example of an LFO controlled auto-wah applied to the bass guitar.

Typical controls on an auto-wah include a sensitivity control to adjust the input level to match the level expected by the envelope follower and other circuitry, a control for the initial cutoff point of the filter, and a control for the depth of the filter sweep. Some more sophisticated units offer controls for the resonance of the filter, multiple filter types, and options for sweeping the filter up or down.

== Notable examples ==
The first envelope-controlled filter built for musical instruments was the Mu-Tron III, invented by Mike Beigel. Other examples include the MXR Envelope Filter and the Boss AW-2 Auto Wah (LFO controlled).

Grateful Dead guitarist Jerry Garcia is known for extensive use of an envelope filter (particularly the Mu-Tron III), examples being his playing on "Estimated Prophet" and "Shakedown Street". Phish guitarist Trey Anastasio also frequently uses the effect, especially in addition to the use of distortion. The guitar solo in "What I Am" by Edie Brickell & New Bohemians features an auto-wah effect. J Mascis became well known for the use of the effect thanks to his role as guitarist in the group Dinosaur Jr.
