= Hohner Pianet =

Electro-mechanical piano built by Hohner

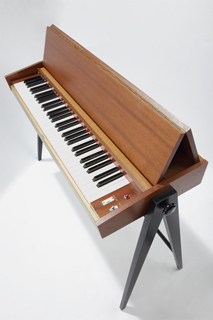
- Pianet N (Version II)
- Manufacturer: Hohner
- Dates: 1962 - 1983

Technical specifications
- Polyphony: Full
- Synthesis type: Electromechanical

Input/output
- Keyboard: 60 or 61 keys

The Hohner Pianet is a type of electro-mechanical piano built by the Hohner company of Trossingen, West Germany and designed by Ernst Zacharias. The Pianet was a variant of his earlier reed-based Hohner electric piano, the Cembalet, which, like the Pianet, was intended for home use. Hohner offered both keyboards in their range until 1968. The Pianet production consisted of two distinctly different mechanism groups with characteristically different sound. The first group, lasting from introduction to 1977, had ground stainless steel reeds, a pick-up using variable capacitance, and leather-faced activation pads. The second group from 1977 until the end of production used rolled spring-steel reeds, electro-magnetic pick-ups, and moulded silicone rubber activation pads.

== Features ==
The Hohner Pianet is an electro-mechanical instrument, and needs to be connected to an amplifier to produce an audible sound. It had 61 keys ranging from F1 to F6 (43.6 Hz – 1396.9 Hz). Later models had 60 keys, missing the top F. Each key is a single lever element pivoted on a fulcrum point with a spring to return it to the rest position. The key is extended at the rear so that a pad can be mounted over a tuned spring steel reed. This pad adheres to the reed when at rest, and lifts and releases the reed causing it to vibrate when the key is depressed. The vibration of the reed is converted to an electrical signal by a pick-up. The resulting sound has a complex mixture of harmonics when the reed is first struck, which later reduces to a cleaner sustained tone.

Early Pianets feature a knee lever volume control. The early 1960s Pianets (Pianet, Pianet C, Pianet CH, and Pianet N) featured lids which opened in an upright 'V' to form a music stand. This feature was introduced on Cembalets and became common to both instruments. The C and N models were equipped with a vibrato circuit operated by a switch mounted next to the keyboard. The N models used a variable-resistance volume pedal cabled to a socket on the rear of the keyboard.

== History ==
=== 1960s ===
The Pianet evolved from the earlier Cembalet, introduced in 1958. Both instruments were designed by Ernst Zacharias. Zacharias became interested in keyboard instruments such as the clavichord, harpsichord and organ as a teenager, and studied electrical engineering at Kiel University. He began working for Hohner in 1954 after meeting designer Siegfried Mager.

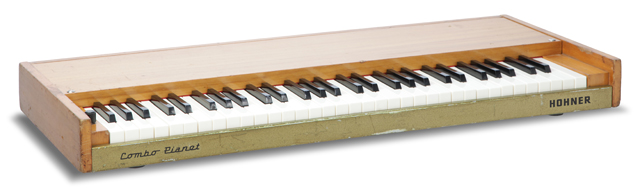
Hohner Combo Pianet sold from 1972 onward.

The Pianet evolved through a number of model changes. These included both self-amplified versions and versions that required the use of an external amplifier and speaker. The most popular model, the Pianet N (denoting "natural wood finish"), evolved through two different specifications. The N had side-mounted ‘inverted-V’ legs, and could be equipped with an optional 12-watt valve amplifier, the Amplifier CP, which mounted below the unit in front of the player's knees.

The Pianet soon found popularity with music groups of the 1960s, including the Beatles, the Zombies and Manfred Mann. This led to Hohner to producing the Combo Pianet model in 1972. It was designed for the performing musician, without legs, and intended to be placed on top of another instrument.

=== 1970s ===
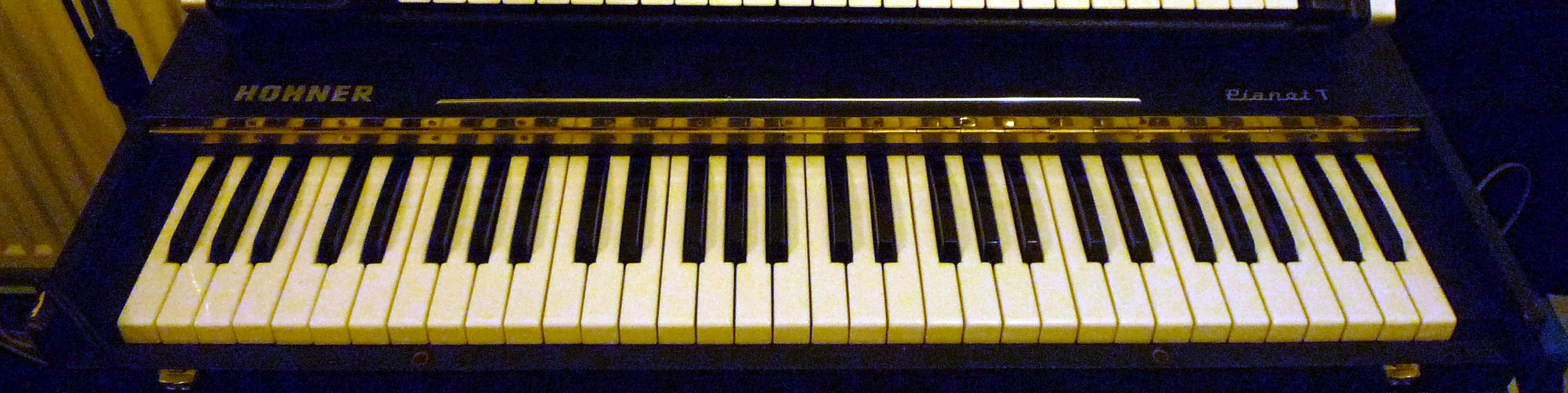
Hohner Pianet T

In 1977, Hohner began producing the second group of models and ceased production of the Pianet N and Combo Pianet. The second group had two models, the Pianet T and M, and a hybrid version combined with a Clavinet, the Pianet/Clavinet Duo. These featured a change in design from electrostatic pick-ups and leather and foam pads to electromagnetic pick-ups (like the Rhodes piano) and silicone rubber pads. The reeds were also changed from the ground finish of the earlier type to a smooth milled finish, making them incompatible with earlier models.

The new range of Pianets had a mellower sound than earlier models. While it could not lend it itself well to rock music, it was aligned more with musical tastes of the time, such as the sound of a Rhodes through a chorus pedal. It was advertised as being practical and portable, but this was misleading as it did not have an inbuilt amplifier or speakers. The M model, designed for home use, was built with a wooden veneer console case with internal speakers, while the T model was vinyl covered and designed for live performance. Subsequently, Hohner produced the Pianet/Clavinet Duo model which combined a Hohner Clavinet (essentially an electric clavichord) with the Pianet T in one instrument, with an integrated preamp that allowed the player to combine the two sounds. Production ceased around 1983.

== Models ==
During the production life, the case, mechanical features and electronics changed with developments in electronics, cheaper manufacturing, and fashion. These were coordinated with Cembalet production changes from the C models onward. Specific manufacturing dates are difficult because of undated sales figures and a lack of consistent worldwide availability.

=== Pianet ===
Approximate manufacturing span 1962–1963

The Pianet has a case side profile with a taper towards the front. It has tapered cylindrical wooden legs that mount to the underside of the case. It has a gold hammertone painted aluminum fascia panel below the keys. This panel also performs the key-leveling function. The keys are injection-moulded plastic. The word 'Pianet' appears in gold facing upward on the left hand end of the music support ledge. The ledge includes a routed recess for the bottom of the music. It has a valve pre-amplifier and a knee lever for volume control.

=== Pianet C & CH ===
Approximate manufacturing span 1963–1965

The Pianet C has a case side profile with a taper towards the front. It has tapered cylindrical wooden legs that mount to the underside of the case. It has a gold hammertone painted aluminum fascia panel below the keys with a lock fitted centrally. This panel also performs the key-leveling function. The keys are injection-moulded plastic.

The word 'Pianet CH' appears in gold facing upward on the left hand end of the music support ledge. The ledge includes a routed recess for the bottom of the music. It has a transistorised pre-amplifier, a knee lever for volume control and optional vibrato effect.

=== Pianet L & LB ===
Approximate manufacturing span 1963–1968

The Pianet L has a stepped rectangular case side profile with no lid. It has straight black tubular steel legs that mount to the underside of the case. It has a black painted aluminum fascia panel below the keys. This panel also performs the key-leveling function. The keys are injection-moulded plastic. It has a transistorised pre-amplifier and amplifier and a knee lever for volume control. It plays through two small internal speakers or through an external amplifier. Available as model L – mains voltage, and model LB – powered by 5 'D' batteries.

=== Pianet N ===
Approximate manufacturing span 1965–1968

The "N" stands for "natural wood finish". has a case profile with a taper towards the front. It has tapered rectangular cross-section legs forming an inverted 'V' that mount to the ends of the case and are secured by a large, threaded knob. The legs are wood-grain to match the case. The legs are braced by a gold cross-bar towards the base of the rear legs.

The instrument has a folding top that prevents the keys from being damage while the instrument is not in use, and also acts as a music stand. This panel also performs the key-leveling function. The keys are injection-moulded plastic. The word 'Pianet N' appears in gold facing forward on the left-hand face of the music support ledge. It has a transistorised pre-amplifier and a floor pedal volume control. An optional amplifier, the Amplifier CP, was available which mounted underneath the keyboard between the legs. It is a 12-watt valve amplifier with two inbuilt speakers and two inputs, one for the keyboard and one for a record player. Vibrato effect is standard.

=== Pianet N Console ===
This variant can be seen on the cover of a Hohner demonstration record for the Pianet. It has an upper case profile with a taper towards the front. It has a gold hammertone painted aluminum fascia panel below the keys with a lock fitted centrally. The keys are injection-moulded plastic. It stands on two shaped panel legs joined by a modesty panel. There is a piano-like volume pedal fixed on a timber extension from the modesty panel. The optional amplifier unit available for the N model is mounted underneath the keyboard between the legs. Vibrato effect is standard.

=== Pianet N II ===
Approximate manufacturing span 1968–1977

The Pianet N (second variant) has a case side-profile with a taper towards the front. It has tapered rectangular cross-section legs forming an inverted 'V' that mount to the ends of the case and are secured by a large threaded knob. The legs are satin black. The legs are braced by a black cross bar towards the base of the rear legs. It has a gold hammertone painted aluminum fascia panel below the keys with a lock fitted centrally. This panel also performs the key-leveling function. The keys are injection-moulded plastic. The word 'Pianet N' appears in gold facing forward on the left hand face of the music support ledge. It has a transistorised pre-amplifier and a floor pedal volume control. Vibrato effect is standard.

=== Combo Pianet ===
Approximate manufacturing span 1972–1977

The Combo Pianet has a rectangular case side-profile and no lid. There are no legs or leg mounting points. Four grey rubber feet are fitted to the underside of the case. It has a gold hammertone painted aluminum fascia panel below the keys. This panel also performs the key-leveling function. The keys are injection-moulded plastic. The words 'Combo Pianet' are screen printed in black on the left end of the fascia. It has a transistorised pre-amplifier and a volume control knob is fitted at the left end of the keyboard.

=== Pianet T ===
Approximate manufacturing span 1977–1983

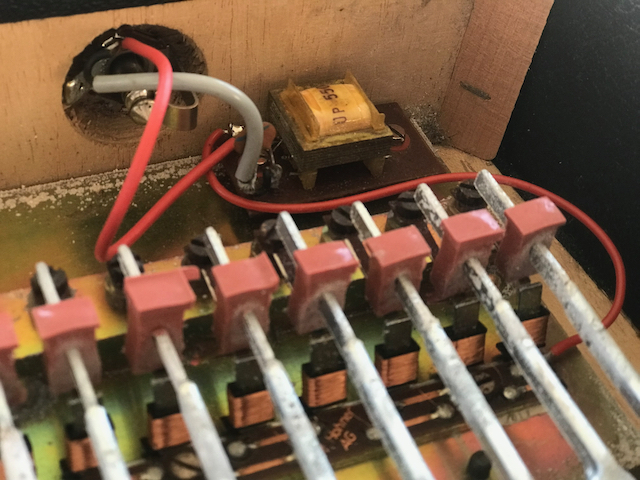
Pianet T electro-mechanical system output.

The Pianet T introduced a very innovative electro-mechanical system where vibrating reeds are plucked by plastic suction pads (patented by NASA). The Pianet T does not require electrical power. The vibrations are converted into electrical energy via an electro-magnetic pick-up. The reeds immediately become damped on release of the keys.

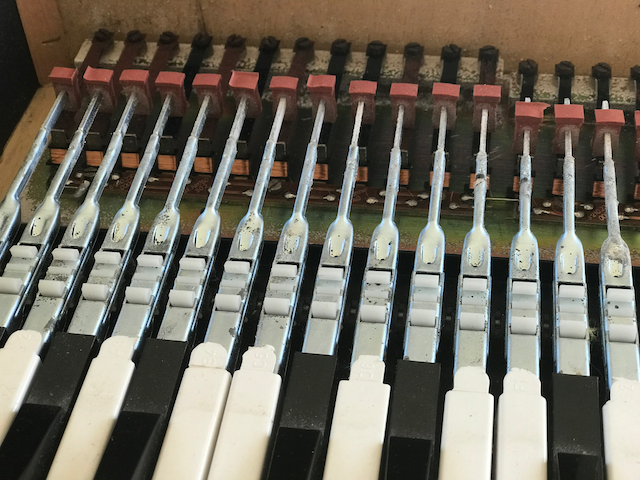
Pianet T passive electro-mechanical system.

The Pianet T has a rectangular case profile with rounded corners and a hinged integral lid with central handle. With the lid latched closed the instrument forms its own carry case. The body of the case is covered with black vinyl leathercloth and the ends are padded with vinyl-skinned urethane foam. There are no legs supplied as standard. An optional stand can be fixed to threaded mounting points on the ends of the case. The keys are injection-moulded plastic over pressed metal frames. The words 'Pianet T' are screen printed in silver on the rear of the case and on the inside surface of the lid.

=== Pianet M ===
Approximate manufacturing span 1977–1983

The Pianet M has the Pianet T mechanism built into a rectilinear wood grain console case. There is no lid over the keys. Sitting above the box that holds the playing mechanism is an amplifier housing with a sloped front face and two player facing cloth speaker-grills. An acrylic music rest slots into the top of this housing. The leg panels are wood-grained boards finished with a timber foot and joined by a horizontal wood grained panel. The word 'Hohner' is printed in gold centrally above the keys. The model 'Pianet – M' is printed on the amplifier cover panel at the rear. Built in Hohner Modulator, another invention of Ernst Zacharias.

=== Pianet/Clavinet Duo ===
Approximate manufacturing span 1978–1983

This hybrid model uses a black case in the style of a Clavinet E7. The Duo has a rectangular case profile with rounded corners and a removable lid to protect the keys and control surface for transport. Samples can be found with both versions of the name: Pianet Clavinet Duo and Clavinet Pianet Duo. The control panels at the left hand end of the instrument include keyboard splits and mixtures of the two instruments as well as normal Clavinet mixture controls.

== Users ==
Early Pianets were used on a number of hit recordings from the 1960s and 1970s, including "She's Not There" by The Zombies; "Louie Louie" by The Kingsmen; "I Am the Walrus", "Getting Better", "The Night Before", "Tell Me What You See", "You Like Me Too Much" by The Beatles; "This Guy's in Love With You" by Herb Alpert; "These Eyes" by The Guess Who. Billy Preston used the Pianet on the number one hit "Family Affair" by Sly and the Family Stone. In the glam rock era, the Pianet was used by Bryan Ferry on the first few Roxy Music albums, for instance featuring prominently in their hit "Editions of You". It was a staple of the "classic lineup" sound of Curved Air (1970–1972), featuring prominently on their first 3 albums, played by both guitarist/keyboardist Francis Monkman and violinist Darryl Way. The 1972–74 lineup of progressive rock pioneers King Crimson used a pair of Pianets in live performance, played both by the group's violinist David Cross, and the guitarist, Robert Fripp. Genesis keyboardist Tony Banks used the Pianet prominently in the group's early career, as a lead instrument through a homemade fuzz box.

Fleetwood Mac's Christine McVie was a noted proponent of the Pianet N and Combo Pianet for live use. In an article written by Bob Doerschuk in the October 1980 issue of Contemporary Keyboard she outlined why she preferred the sound of the 1960s Pianets live and why she eventually replaced them with other keyboards.

The Pianet is enjoying a renaissance (e.g. Bugge Wesseltoft's Change) due to its unique sound and the availability of new pads for the earlier models, most of which had been reduced to unplayability due to pad decay. It is also popular as a substitute for the Fender Rhodes or Wurlitzer electric piano, which has a related reed-based mechanism for generating sound but is typically much heavier, requires more maintenance than the Pianet, and is overall more expensive.

== Restoration issues ==
Following the end of production, replacement parts for Pianets became progressively harder to find because they were no longer being supported by Hohner. The principal problem was the activation pads for 1960s-manufactured models, which used a Urethane foam damper behind the leather surface. This decomposed with age, making the pads unusable. Hohner intended the pads to be a service-replaceable item (like the strings of a guitar), and sold spares while the instrument was in production. After the supply ran out, restorers and players had to create their own pads.

The second group of Pianets, the T and M, used silicone rubber for their pads. They have aged extremely well and are still functional in most keyboards, as of 2012. The silicone pads of the T & M are not suitable for the 1960s Pianets. Their adhesion properties don't suit the ground reeds of the first group of instruments, and they produce a static discharge that is amplified by the capacitive pick-up of the instrument. In the 2000s, a number of businesses took up the servicing and maintenance of vintage keyboards, so pads suitable for both groups of Pianets are now available.

The mechanical structure of keys, pivot rail, reeds, reed bar and pick-up are the same in the 1960s Pianets from the "Mk.1" and C to the Combo, so spares to get a Pianet working can come from most models. While the electronics differ from model to model, they can be exchanged if the aim is to make a keyboard playable rather than to restore it.

== Bibliography ==
- Lenhoff, Alan; Robertson, David (2019). Classic Keys: Keyboard sounds that launched rock music. University of North Texas Press. ISBN 978-1-57441-776-0.
- Vail, Mark (2000). Vintage Synthesizers : Pioneering Designers, Groundbreaking Instruments, Collecting Tips, Mutants of Technology. Backbeat Books. ISBN 978-0-87930-603-8.
