= Cembalet =

Electro-mechanical piano

The Cembalet C from the Hohner A190 product catalogue 1963

The Cembalet is a type of electro-mechanical piano built by the Hohner company of Trossingen, West Germany from the late 1950s to the late 1960s, and designed by Ernst Zacharias. It was a reed-based electric piano intended for home use, and the first keyboard produced by Hohner as a piano-like instrument rather than an instrument having the sustained note of an organ. It was adopted by popular musicians for recording and performance in the early 1960s because it was portable and easy to amplify electronically.

== General description ==
The Cembalet is an electro-mechanical piano requiring amplification to produce a usable sound level. Cembalets have 61 keys and a keyboard range of C2 to C7 (65.4 Hz – 2093 Hz). The Cembalet had ground stainless steel reeds and a pick-up using variable capacitance. The keyboard action is very simple. Each key is a single lever element pivoted on a fulcrum point with a spring to return it to the rest position. The key is extended at the rear so that a plectrum and damper pad can be mounted close to the tuned spring steel reed. This plectrum lifts and releases the reed causing it to vibrate when the key is depressed. The vibration of the reed is converted to an electrical signal by a pick-up. The unique playing feel of a Cembalet comes from the resistance of the steel reeds as they reach and exceed their point of release.

== Comparison with Pianet ==
After introducing the Cembalet, Hohner produced a variation of the mechanical design named the Pianet. These two instruments were sold in parallel until the late 1960s. Case styles were identical for models C and N through the 1960s causing many to misidentify these instruments. The most obvious point of visual difference is the differing keyboard range, C to C for the Cembalet and F to F for the Pianet.

Reed-based pianos have voices that differ markedly depending on the material and geometry of the reeds, the way they are excited, and the way the vibrations are converted to electrical energy. The Cembalet pushed the tip of the reed upward until it cleared the plectrum, whereas the Pianet pulls the reed upward using a pad adhered over a length of around one quarter inch positioned back from the tip of the reed. The attack of the note and the harmonics produced vary significantly. In addition the plate of the capacitive pickup is to the side in the Cembalet producing further differences in the way the vibration of the reed is converted to an electrical signal.

== Models ==
During the production life of the Cembalet the case, mechanical features and electronics changed to keep pace with developments in electronics manufacture, reductions in manufacturing costs, and fashion. Changes to the Cembalet were also applied to Pianet production. Dating the manufacturing envelope and availability of the various Cembalet models is confused by misidentification of Pianet models as Cembalets and by the differences in sales availability of models between Europe and the United States.

=== Cembalet ===
Approximate manufacturing span 1958–1960

The Cembalet has a rectangular case side-profile with no taper towards the front. It has a gold lid lift bar fitted to the front of the lid. It has tapered cylindrical wooden legs with gold ferrules at the foot that mount to angled blocks on the underside of the case. It has a wooden fascia panel below the keys with a central lid lock. The keys are wood with conventional plastic laminates for the top and front. The word 'Cembalet' appears in gold facing upward on the left hand end of the music support ledge. The ledge includes a routed recess for the bottom of the music. It has a valve pre-amplifier and a knee lever for volume control.

=== Cembalet I & Cembalet II (console model) ===
Approximate manufacturing span 1960–1963

The Cembalet I has a rectangular case side-profile with no taper towards the front. It has a gold lid lift bar fitted to the front of the lid. It has tapered cylindrical wooden legs with gold ferrules at the foot that mount to angled blocks on the underside of the case. It has a wooden fascia panel below the keys with a central lid lock. The keys were initially wood with plastic laminate for the top and front, but were later replaced by injection-moulded plastic keys. The word 'Cembalet I' appears in gold facing upward on the left hand end of the music support ledge. The ledge includes a routed recess for the bottom of the music. It has a valve pre-amplifier and a knee lever for volume control. The Cembalet II has a side case profile with taper towards the front of the lid. It has a gold lid lift bar fitted to the front of the lid. The sides are extended to the floor with a shaped foot extending toward the player. It has a wooden fascia panel below the keys with a central lid lock. The music support ledge includes a formed recess for the bottom of the music. A speaker housing containing two speakers is fitted below the keyboard and spans the full width of the keyboard in front of the player's knees. Just one speaker was used in early Cembalet II. Two additional rotary controls are fitted at the left hand end of the keyboard.

=== Cembalet C, CF, & CH ===
Approximate manufacturing span 1963–1965

The Cembalet C has a case profile with a taper towards the front. It has tapered cylindrical legs that mount to the underside of the case. It has a gold hammertone painted aluminum fascia panel below the keys with a lock fitted centrally. This panel also performs the key leveling function. The keys are injection-moulded plastic. The word 'Cembalet C' or 'CH' appears in gold facing upward on the left hand end of the music support ledge. The ledge includes a formed recess for the bottom of the music. It has a transistorised pre-amplifier and a knee lever for volume control.

=== Cembalet LH – probably a prototype ===
Manufactured: sometime during C production

The Cembalet LH has a case profile with a taper towards the front. It has tapered cylindrical legs that mount to the underside of the case. It has a gold hammertone painted aluminium fascia panel below the keys with a lock fitted centrally. This panel also performs the key leveling function. The keys are injection-moulded plastic. The word 'Cembalet LH' appears in gold facing upward on the left hand end of the music support ledge. The ledge includes a formed recess for the bottom of the music. It has a transistorised pre-amplifier, a small transistorised power amplifier, two small speakers like the Pianet L and a knee lever for volume control.

=== Cembalet N ===
Approximate manufacturing span 1965–1968

The Cembalet N has a case profile with a taper towards the front. It has tapered rectangular cross-section legs in an inverted 'V' that mount to the ends of the case and are secured by a large threaded knob. The legs are braced by a gold cross bar towards the base of the rear legs. It has a gold hammertone painted aluminum fascia panel below the keys with a lock fitted centrally. This panel also performs the key leveling function. The keys are injection-moulded plastic. The word 'Cembalet N' appears in gold facing forward on the left hand face of the music support ledge. It has a transistorised pre-amplifier and a floor pedal volume control. An optional amplifier, the Amplifier CP, was available which mounted underneath the keyboard between the legs. It is a 12 watt valve amplifier with two inbuilt speakers and two inputs, one for the keyboard and one for a record player.

== Bibliography ==
Vail, Mark. Vintage Synthesizer. Backbeat Books, 1993 & 2000, ISBN 0-87930-603-3 - Chapter on electric pianos, harpsichords & clavichords of the 50s & 60s by Barry Carson.
