= Mu-Tron =

Audio effects manufacturer

Musitronics Corporation
- Industry: Music
- Founded: 1972
- Founder: Mike Beigel and Aaron Newman
- Defunct: 1979, revived in 2014
- Headquarters: Rosemont, New Jersey, United States
- Products: Electronic musical effects
- Website: mu-tron.com

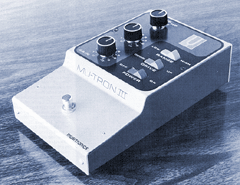
A Mu-tron III envelope filter

Musitronics, often shortened to Mu-tron, is a manufacturer of electronic musical effects that first became active in the 1970s. Founded by Mike Beigel and Aaron Newman, the company's products provided filtering and processing effects and were derived from synthesizer components. The company was known for producing high-quality products with many user-adjustable parameters, but high production costs and a failed product line, the Gizmotron, initially caused its downfall.

Their best-known product was the Mu-tron III envelope filter, "the world's first envelope-controlled filter", first made in 1972 and quickly becoming an essential effect for many funk musicians. It was placed back in production again, in a modified form, in 2014.

== Company history ==
The Musitronics Corporation of Rosemont, New Jersey was formed in 1972 by Mike Beigel and Aaron Newman, an engineer who worked at Guild Guitar Company. Beigel had been working on a synthesizer project for Guild, but the project was dropped after Guild's president, Al Dronge, was killed in an accident. The new president was less interested in the synthesizer project, and Beigel teamed up with a former Guild engineer, Aaron Newman, to save what he could, and formed Musitronics. They extracted sections from the synthesizer to make a stand-alone audio effect out of it; the result was an envelope filter, the Mu-tron III, built in the summer of 1972, which proved popular and viable enough with major music instrument retailers to build the company on. Musitronic built a plant out of a former chicken coop in Rosemont, and soon employed 35 people.

The company offered traditional effects such as simple phase shifters, flangers, and foot-operated wah pedals as well. With George Merriman, former partner of guitarist and guitar and effect builder Dan Armstrong, Mutronics built the Octave Divider, and later made the Armstrong plug-in effects.

In 1978 Musitronics was sold to synthesizer company ARP Instruments in 1979, on a royalty basis, but ARP folded before the original owners of Musitronics could ever collect any money. Musitronics became Gizmo Incorporated and continued to try their hand at products, but it ended when Aaron Newman suffered a heart attack.

By 2014 Beigel returned to making effects with his new company Mu-FX, producing a "modified and miniaturized version" of the Mu-Tron III, renamed the Tru-Tron 3X. A few years later, the Micro-Tron 3 was introduced. Features include an extreme reduction of size (along the lines of a tube screamer or phase 90), a second foot switch for selecting the sweep up or down and the ability to run off a standard 9v adapter. Inside the pedal, there are 3 pins which a jumper can select the tru-Tron buffer (pins 1&2) or the original mutron buffer (pins 2&3). It is widely considered far & away the most user friendly out of the 3 envelope filters the company has officially released since 1972.

== Mu-Tron III ==
The Mu-Tron III was based on a Guild prototypes called the Timbre Generator. Beigel said he chose the envelope-controlled filter over other synthesizer elements, such as ring modulation, because it sounded more musical; it was a more general effect that would lend itself to a variety of applications, and it was easy to use.

The Mu-Tron III became an instant success and was used by a variety of musicians for a variety of instruments, especially guitar, Clavinet, and bass. Perhaps the best-known use of it is by Stevie Wonder, who used it on his Clavinet for the song "Higher Ground".

In early 1995 Beigel lent his expertise to Electro-Harmonix, creating an update of his original design, the Electro-Harmonix Q-Tron, and he also designed a Bi-Filter for E-H. Three other pedals, the Mini Q-Tron, Micro Q-Tron and Q-Tron+, are available from EHX as well, who now also offer the Bi-Filter, a modern version of Beigel Sound Lab's Envelope Controlled Filter, made in 1979. Michael Dregni, in Vintage Guitar, noted that none of the "clones, copycats, and other attempts to bring it back...sounded quite like the real deal". But in 2014, a renewed version of the Mu-Tron III, now called the Tru-Tron 3X, was made by Beigel's new company Mu-FX.

== Phasers ==
=== Mu-tron Bi-Phase ===
Mu-tron Bi-Phase with expression pedal.

Phaser effects were common in the 1970s, but the Mu-tron Bi-Phase combined two phase shifting circuits and in its time was "the phaser-lover's 'phasor'". It used technology from the old Uni-Vibe, with lamps and photo cells, and featuring two independent sweep generators which could be coupled, each with individual rate controls and the option to choose square or sine waves. The unit could be connected to an optional rocking foot pedal so that the effect could be operated in the manner of a wah-wah pedal. It was used by The Smashing Pumpkins as an integral part in achieving the "pumpkins sound" for the 1993 album Siamese Dream: "This is one of the secrets to our secret sound. This is the Mutron Biphase. We run everything through it - everything. It's fabulous", said producer Butch Vig in the video documentary Vieuphoria.

The Bi-Phase was featured on an episode of the BBC show The Repair Shop, where a 40-year old model was restored to fully working quality.

=== Mu-tron Phasor ===
A simpler design than the Bi-phase, it included only rate and depth controls. The Phasor II introduced additional functionality brought over from the Bi-Phase, as a kind of scaled-down version.

== Other Mu-Tron effects ==
=== Mu-tron Octave Divider ===
The Octave Divider used the octave effect, producing tones an octave above and below the input signal. There were many clones of the original Octavia around, but Mutronics' version, designed by George Merriman, had many more adjustable parameters.

=== Mu-tron Flanger ===
A bucket-brigade flanger which offered extensive control of effect parameters.

=== Mu-tron Vol-Wah Pedal ===
A dual volume and wah foot-operated rocking pedal with photo-electric controls, and a gain boost flat screw potentiometer on the side of the chassis.

== Dan Armstrong effects ==
Between 1976 and 1978 Musitronics manufactured a series of modular, plug-in effects for Dan Armstrong amplifiers. These included the Green Ringer, an octave effect, the Yellow Humper, a frequency booster designed for bass guitar, the Purple Peaker, a similar boost effect for electric guitar, and the Orange Squeezer, a signal compressor.

== The Gizmo ==
The Gizmo, also called the Gizmotron, was a device developed by Lol Creme and Kevin Godley of 10cc, and manufactured by an offshoot of Musitronics called Gizmotronics. The device used motor-driven plastic wheels to produce infinitely sustained notes on a guitar. The device was problematic, and Gizmotronics entered bankruptcy before very many had been produced.
