= Brandon Santini =

- Born: Brandon Santini; February 3, 1982 (age 44); Chapel Hill, North Carolina, United States
- Genres: Blues, roots rock, blues rock, Americana
- Occupations: Musician, songwriter
- Instruments: Harmonica, vocals, guitar
- Labels: American Showplace, Endless Blues, Vizztone, Mo Mojo
- Website: http://www.brandonsantini.com

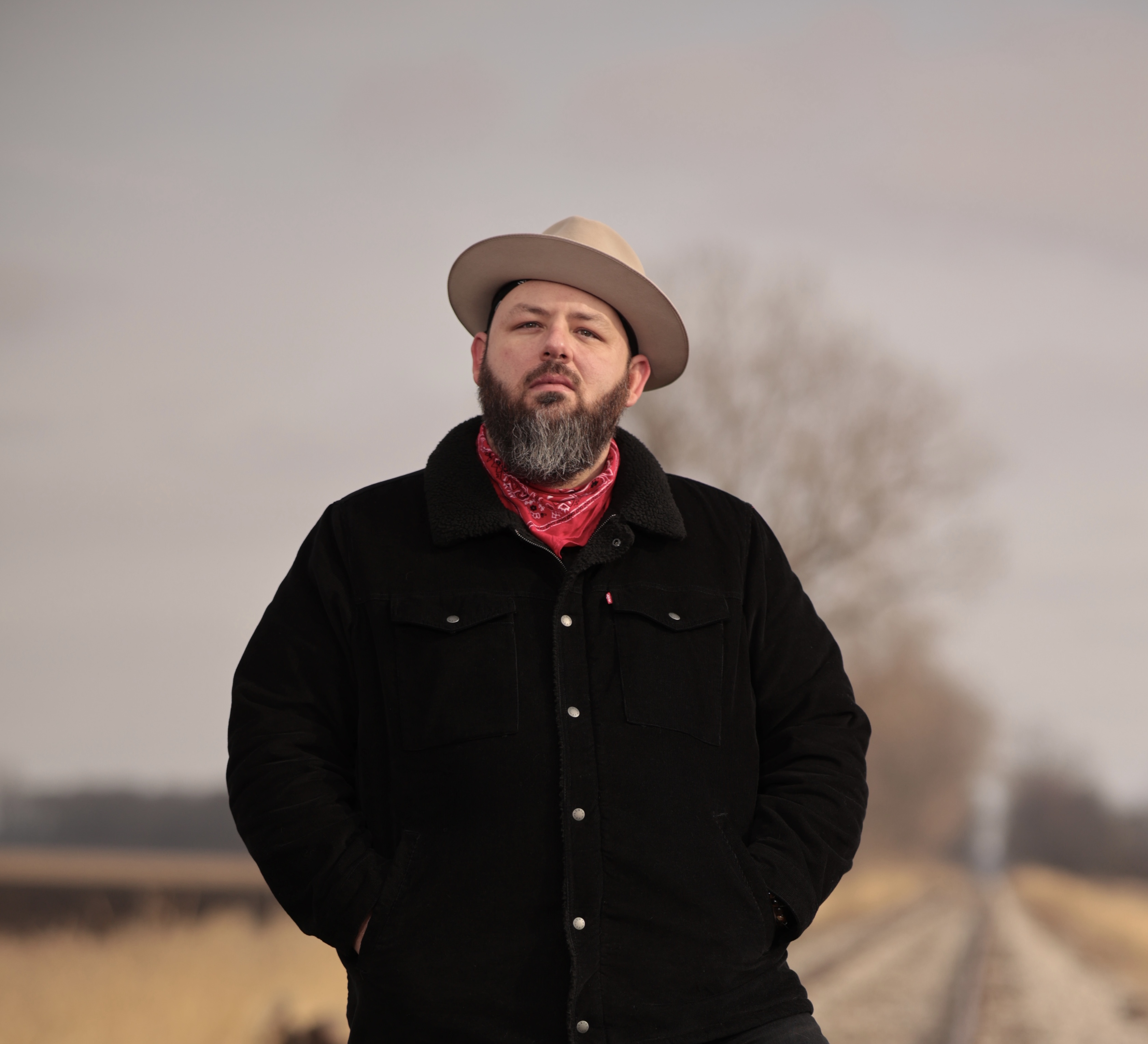

Brandon Santini (born February 3, 1982) is an American roots rock and blues harmonica player, singer and songwriter. Several of his releases have made the national Billboard Blues Chart. He has been nominated for multiple Blues Music Awards and multiple Blues Blast Music Awards. Blues Blast magazine called him "one of the best harp players in the blues scene today." His music is featured in the CBS television series “Marshals,” (S1 E4) a spin off of the hit series “Yellowstone,”Paramount+ television series “Tulsa King” (S3 E5&7), as well as the CBS original television series, “Fire Country,” (S2 E8) and The NBC Peacock Network’s original television series, “Poker Face,” (S1 E4).

== Background ==
Santini was born in Chapel Hill, North Carolina, United States, and took up harmonica at age 15 after hearing Blues Traveler vocalist and harmonica player John Popper. Not only influenced by Popper, he was also influenced by the classic blues harp players of the 1950s and 1960s. He moved to Memphis, Tennessee, at the age of 21 where he mastered playing the blues in clubs on Beale Street.

== Career ==
Santini was raised in Burlington, North Carolina, then moved to Memphis, Tennessee in his early 20s. His love for the blues took off after discovering John Popper and Paul Butterfield He soon formed the band Delta Highway which released an album in 2008 entitled The Devil Had A Woman. After the breakup of Delta Highway, Santini released his debut album, Songs of Love, Money and Misery, in 2011. In 2013, Santini released This Time Another Year. The album was nominated for numerous Blues Music Awards. It was recorded at the Ardent Studios. His 2019 album, The Longshot, was released to positive reviews and peaked at Number 7 on the Billboard Blues Album Chart. In 2019, Santini became an endorsed artist for Hohner Harmonicas. He announced his new group Tennessee Redemption, a band co-fronted with Jeff Jensen in mid 2019. He won a Blues Blast Music Award in 2019 for best Contemporary Blues Album.

Throughout Santini’s career he has toured the world including concerts throughout North America, Europe, India, and Egypt. Santini has performed on stage with notable artists such as Blues Traveler, Beth Hart, Buddy Guy, Gary Clark Jr., Charlie Musselwhite, Randy Houser, Parmalee, Bernie Marsden (Whitesnake), Maggie Bell (Stone The Crows), Jed Potts, The Record Company, members of Live, The North Mississippi Allstars, & blues legend Muddy Waters’ band.

Santini has performed numerous times on Joe Bonamassa's Keeping The Blues Alive At Sea Cruise and The Legendary Rhythm & Blues Cruise.

Santini’s song, “Got Good Lovin” is featured in S1 E4 of The NBC Peacock Network’s original series, “Poker Face” starring Natasha Lyonne, Benjamin Bratt & Adrien Brody. In addition, his song, “Somebody’s Gotta Go,” is featured in S2 E8 of the CBS original series, “Fire Country,” starring Max Theriot, and is the theme song for The Country Shine podcast with Graham Bunn.

== Discography ==
- Songs of Love, Money and Misery - 2011
- This Time Another Year - 2013
- Live & Extended! - 2015
- The Longshot - 2019
- Tennessee Redemption - 2019
- Don't Shake The Devil's Hand - 2022
- Which Way Do We Go? - 2025
