= Hohner =

German musical instrument manufacturer

Hohner Musikinstrumente GmbH & Co. KG
- Type: Private
- Industry: Musical instruments
- Founded: 1857; 169 years ago
- Founder: Matthias Hohner
- Successor: H.S. Anderson (for electric guitars)
- Headquarters: Trossingen, Baden-Württemberg, Germany
- Area served: Worldwide
- Products: Current: Harmonicas, melodicas, accordions, recorder flutes; Former: Kazoos, electric, acoustic, resonator and classical guitars, basses, mandolins, ukuleles
- Parent: KHS Musical Instruments
- Website: hohner.de

Hohner Musikinstrumente GmbH & Co. KG is a German manufacturer of musical instruments, founded in 1857 by Matthias Hohner (1833–1902). It is a subsidiary of Matth. Hohner AG. The roots of the Hohner firm are in Trossingen, Baden-Württemberg. Hohner has manufactured a wide range of instruments, such as harmonicas, kazoos, accordions, recorder flutes, melodicas, banjos, electric, acoustic, resonator and classical guitars, basses, mandolins and ukuleles (under the brand name Lanikai). Hohner is known mostly for its harmonicas.

From the 1940s through 1990s, the company also manufactured various electric/electronic keyboards. Especially in the 1960s and 1990s, they manufactured a range of innovative and popular electromechanical keyboard instruments; the cembalet, pianet, basset, guitaret, and clavinet. In the 1980s, several Casio synthesizers (such as the Casio HT-3000/Hohner KS61midi and the VZ-1/HS-2) were sold under the Hohner brand.

Nowadays, Hohner produces harmonicas, melodicas, accordions and recorder flutes.

== History ==
Past and present Hohner products

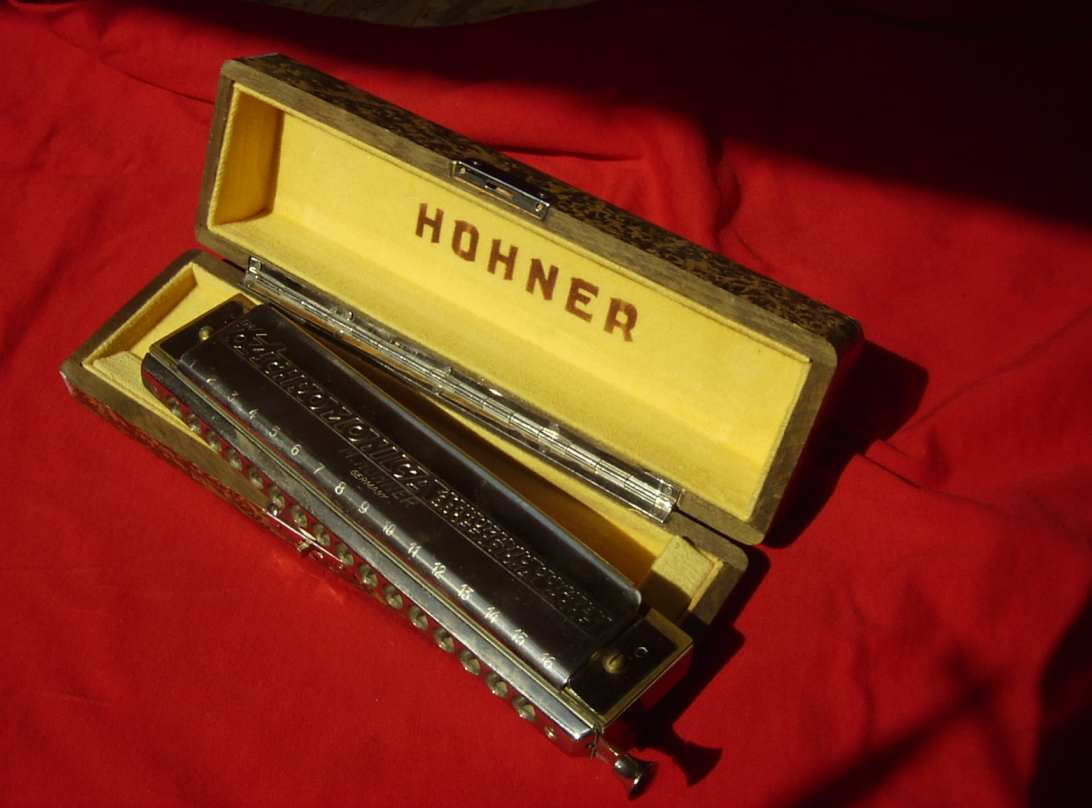
Harmonica

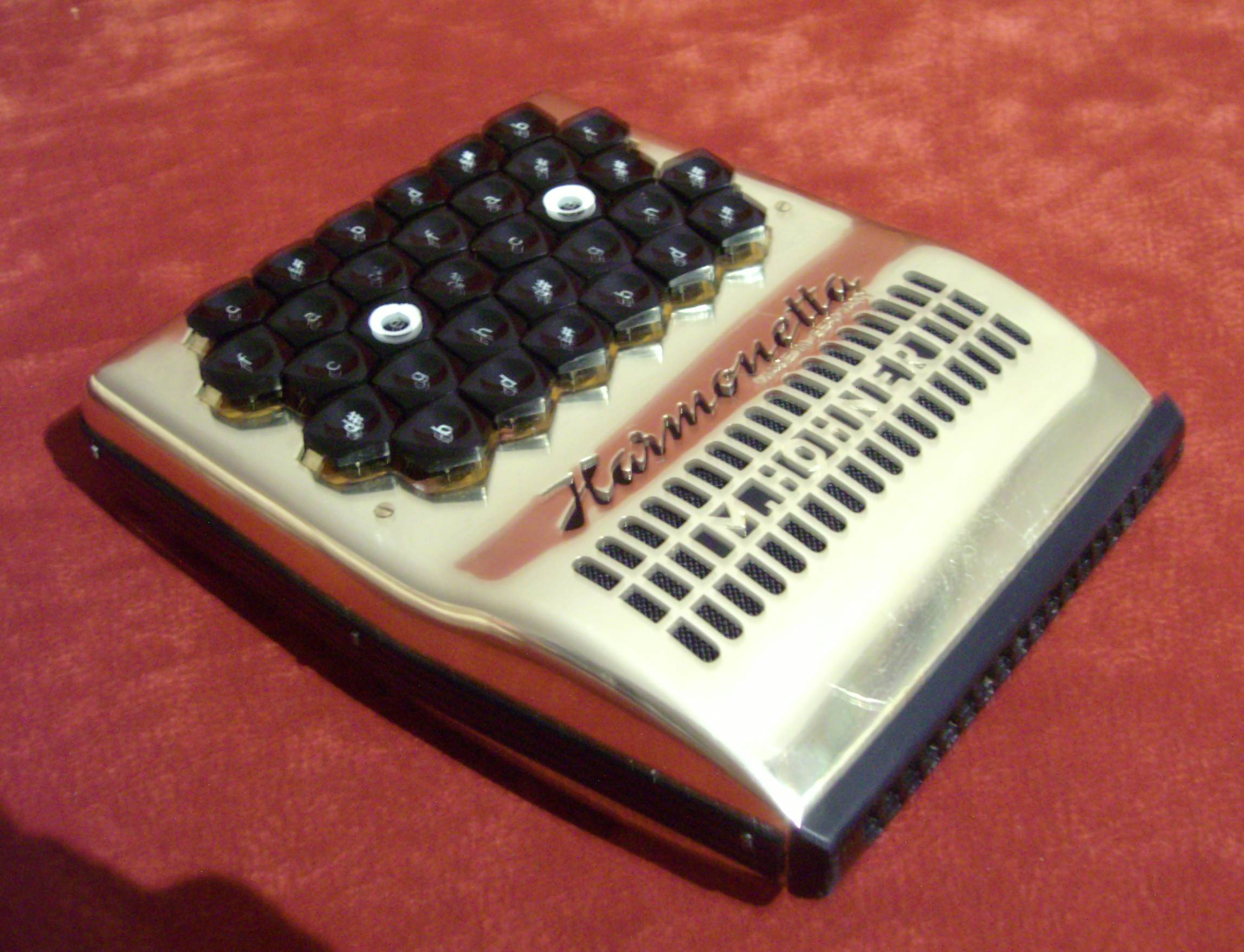
Harmonetta

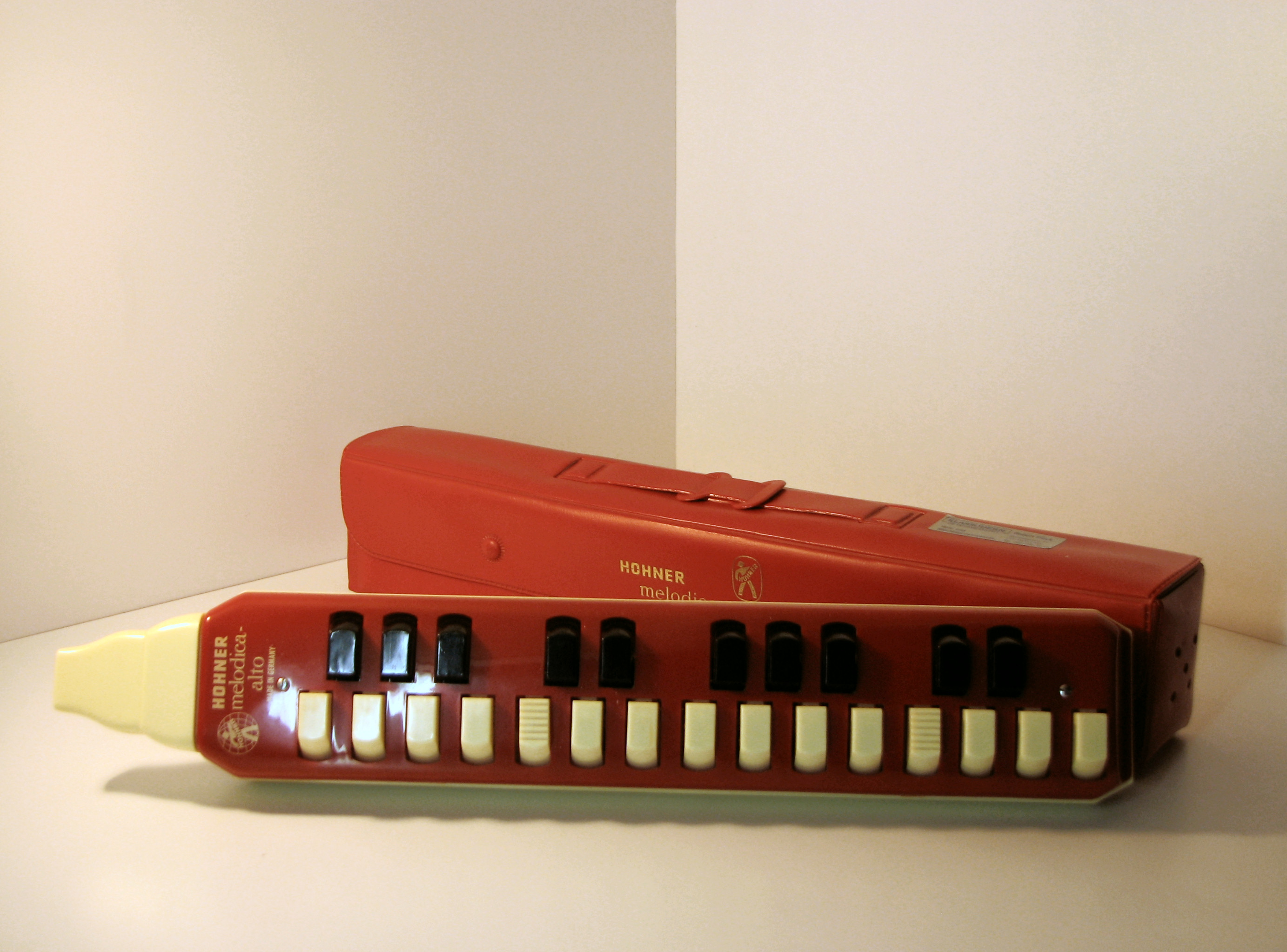
Melodica

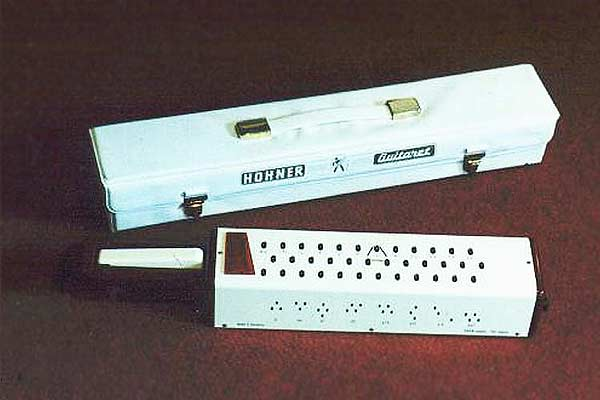
Guitaret

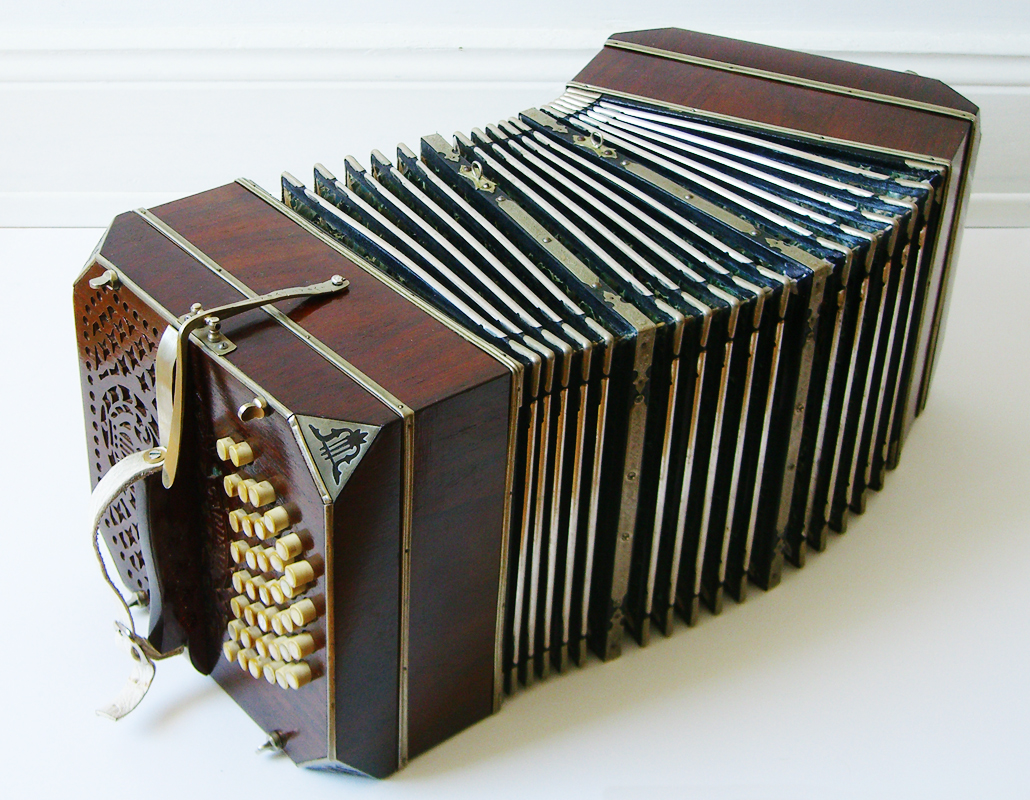
Bandoneon

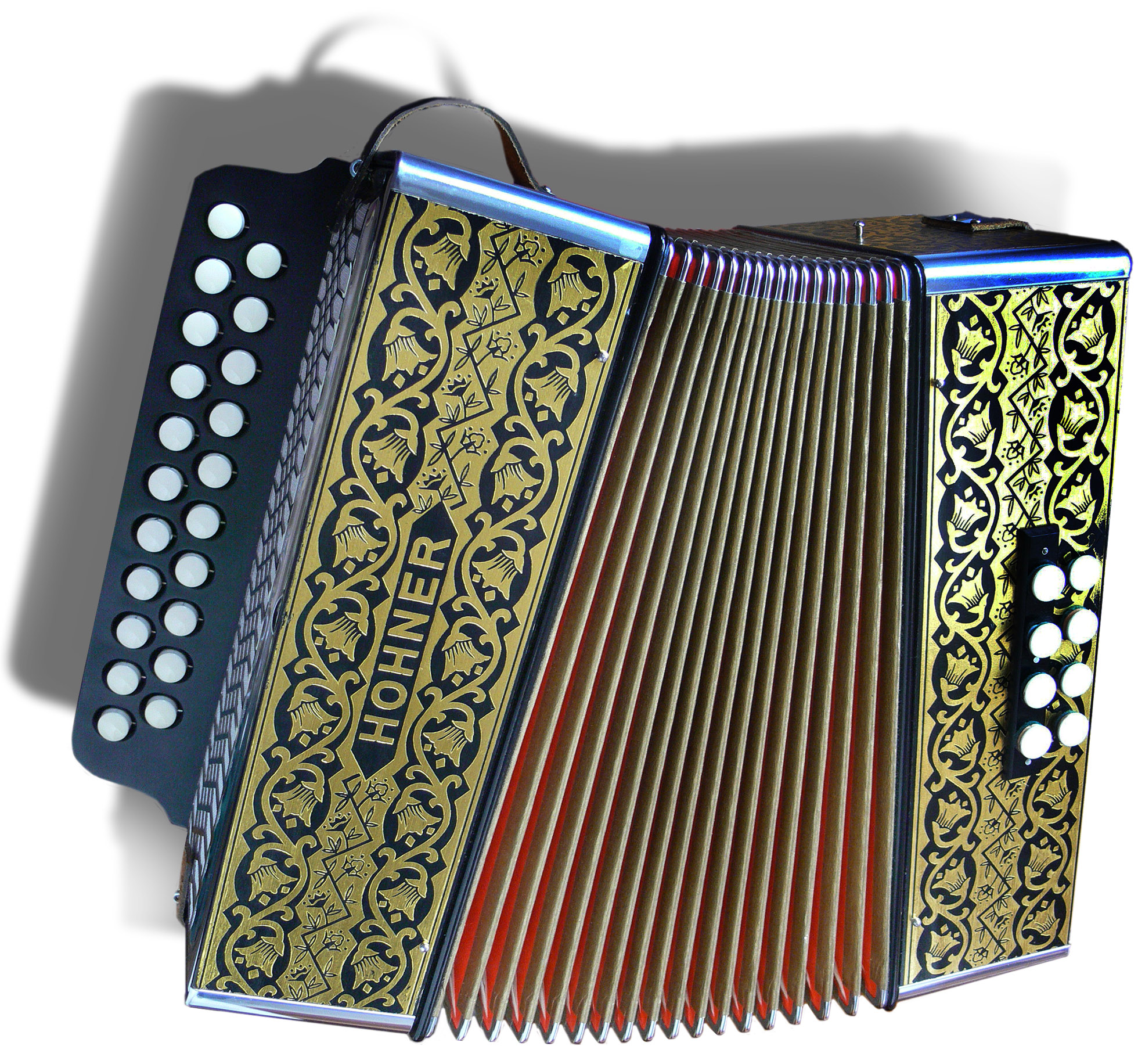
Melodeon (accordion)

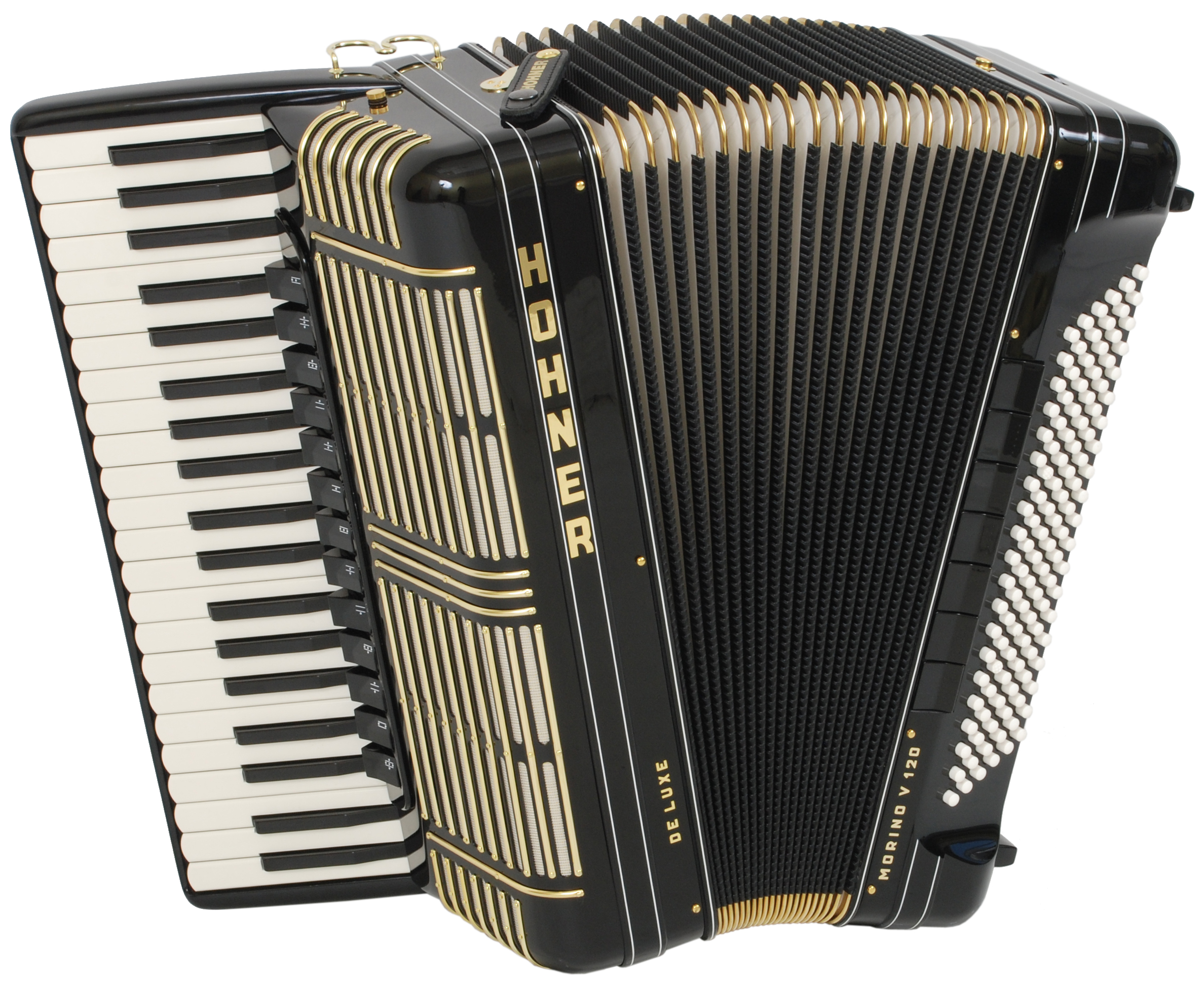
Accordion

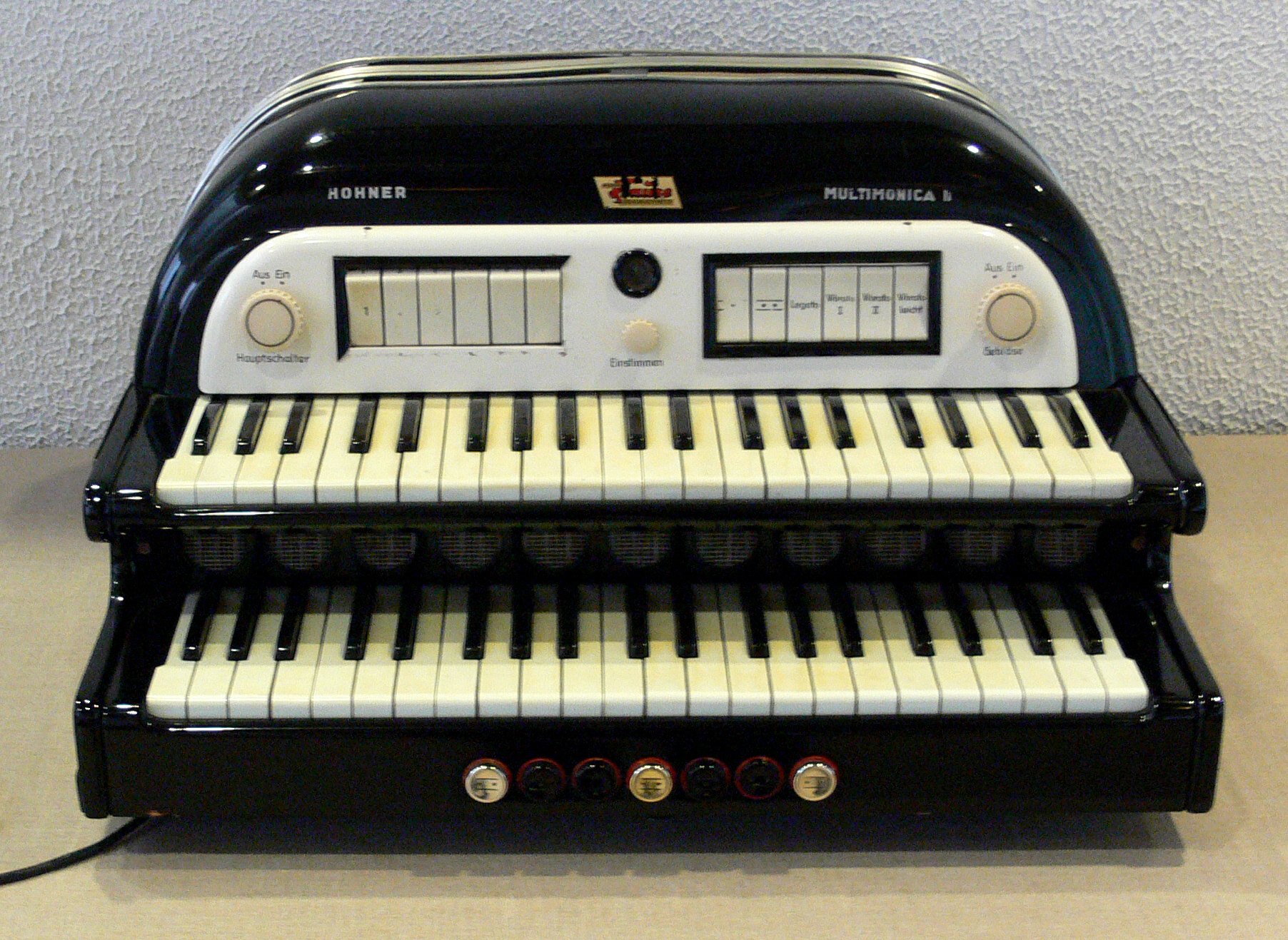
Multimonica

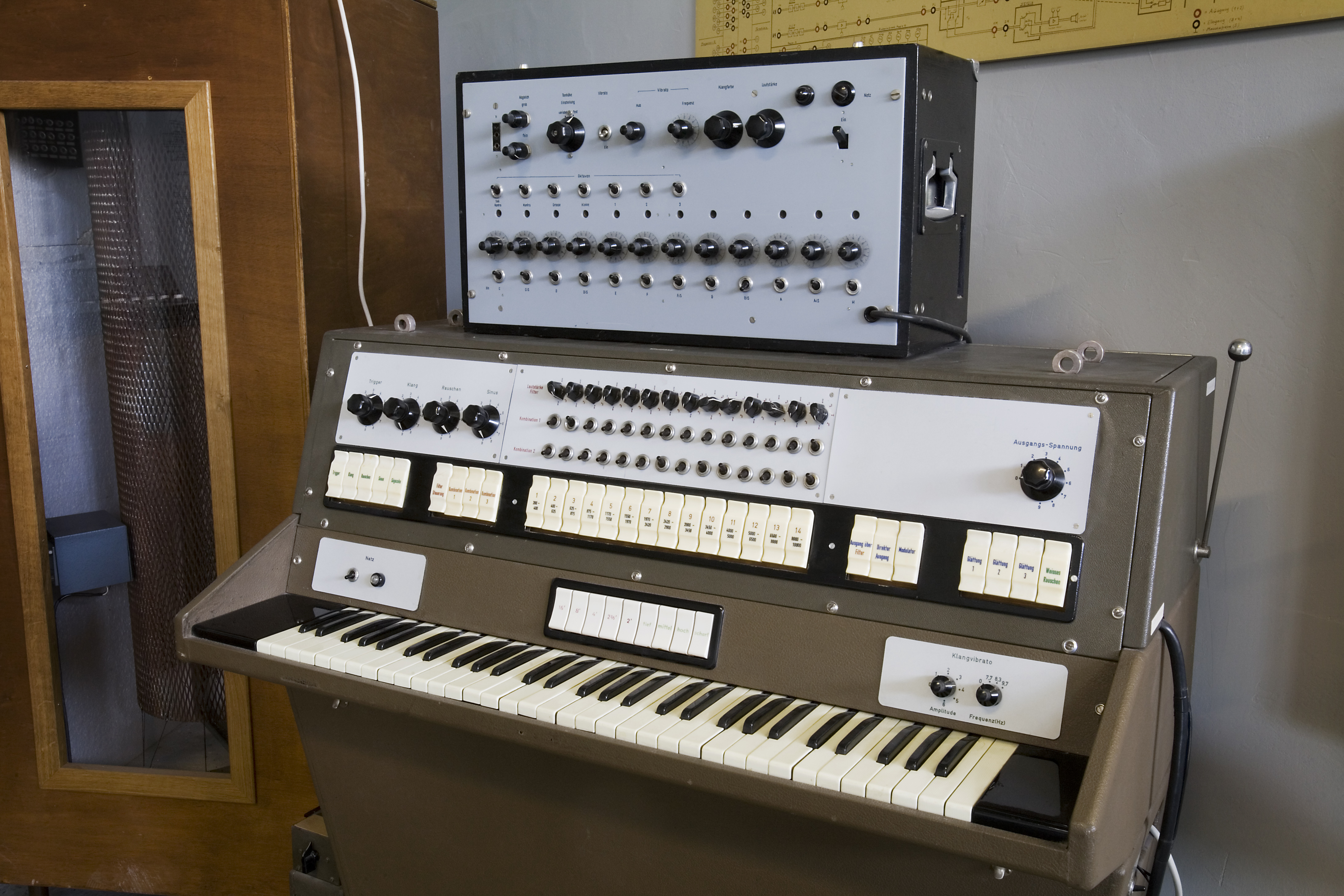
Hohnerola

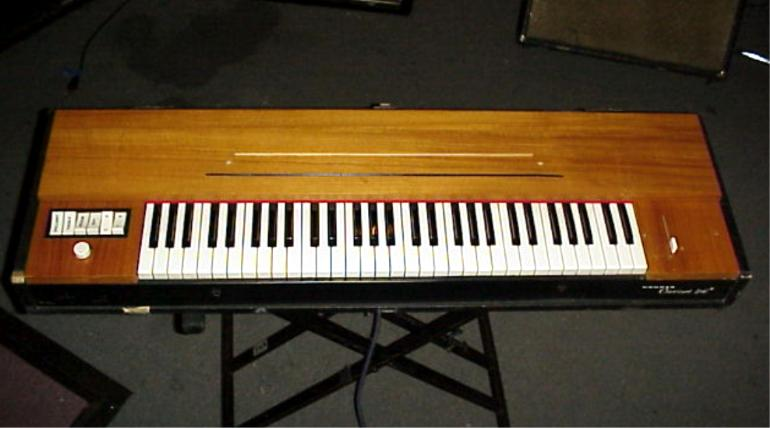
Clavinet D6

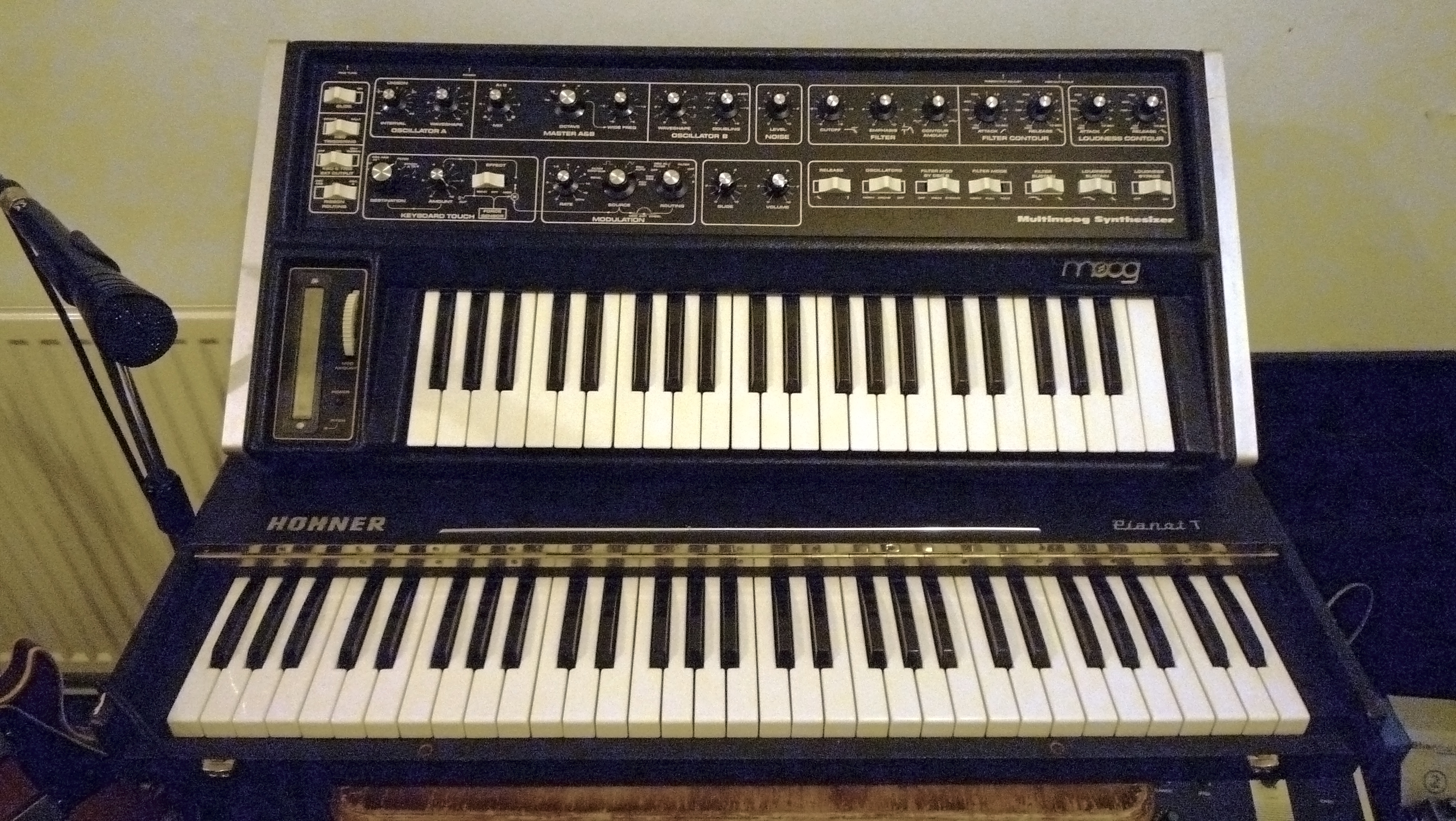
Pianet

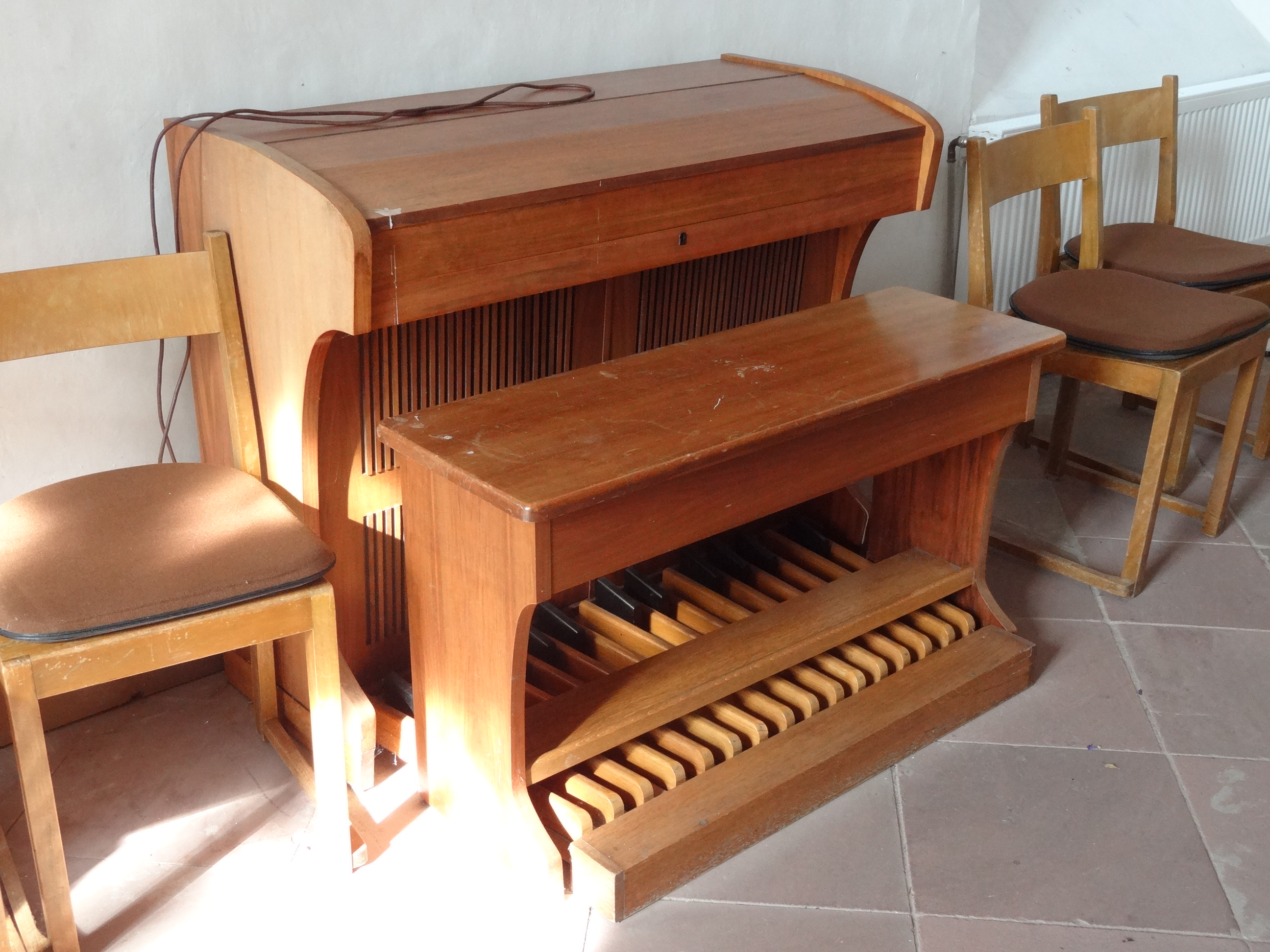
Electronic organ

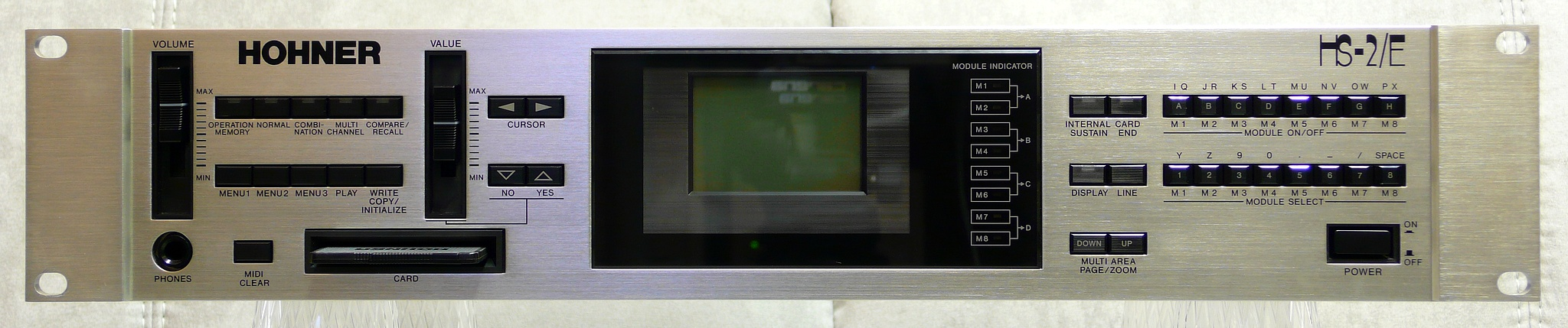
Synthesizer

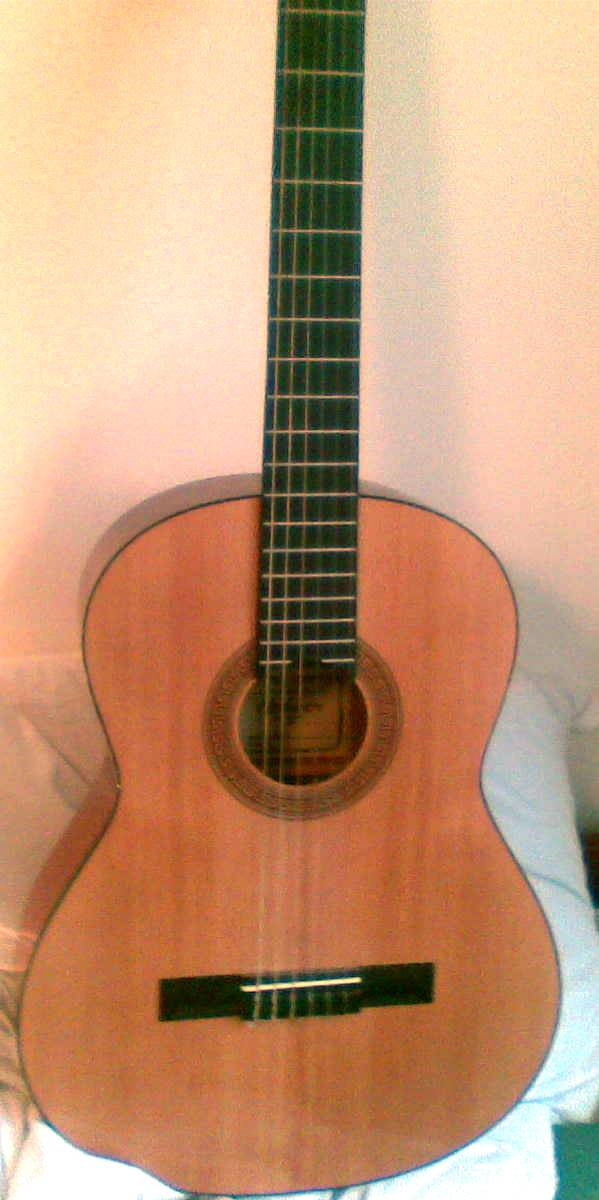
Guitar

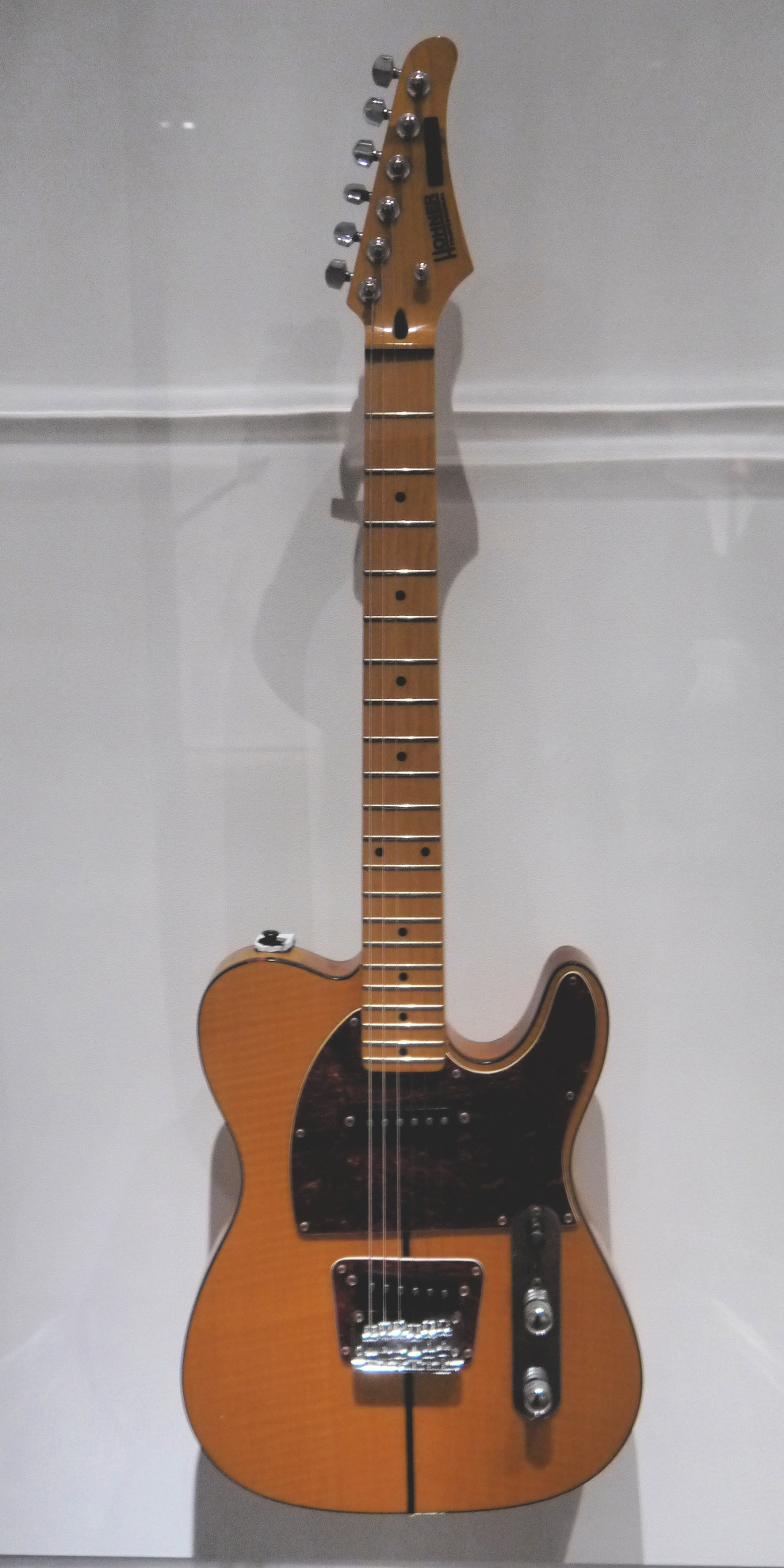

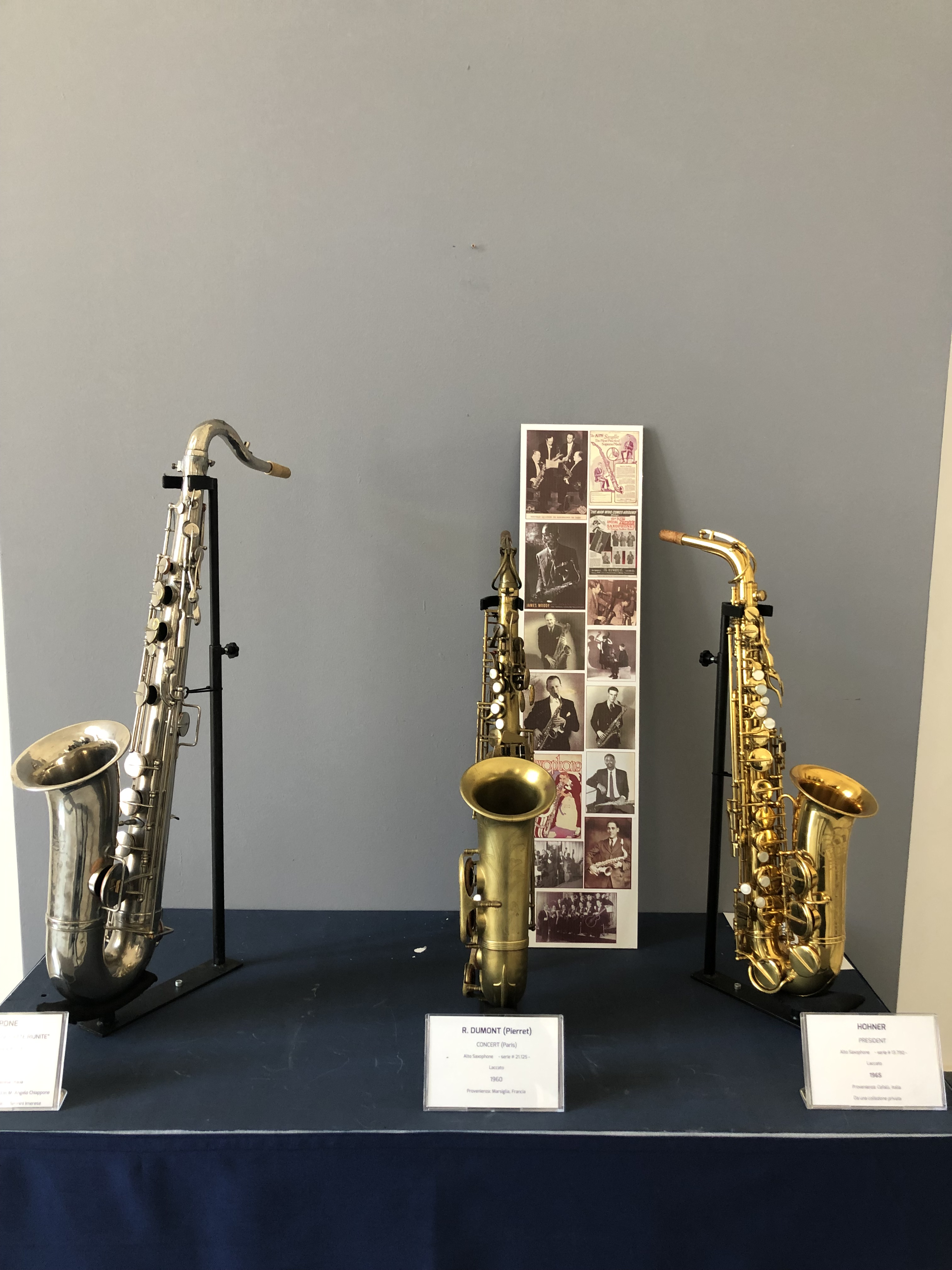
Sax

Clock maker Matthias Hohner began crafting diatonic harmonicas in 1857, assisted by his wife and a single employee. 650 were made in the first year. Hohner harmonicas quickly became popular, and in his lifetime Matthias built the largest harmonica factory in the world. During the American Civil War, Matthias Hohner distributed harmonicas to family members in the United States who in turn gave them to the soldiers.

In the 1920s, Hohner began manufacturing chromatic harmonicas, which unlike the "standard" diatonic form can be played in any key. Famous harmonicist Borrah Minevitch claimed he sold his design for the chromatic harmonica to Hohner.

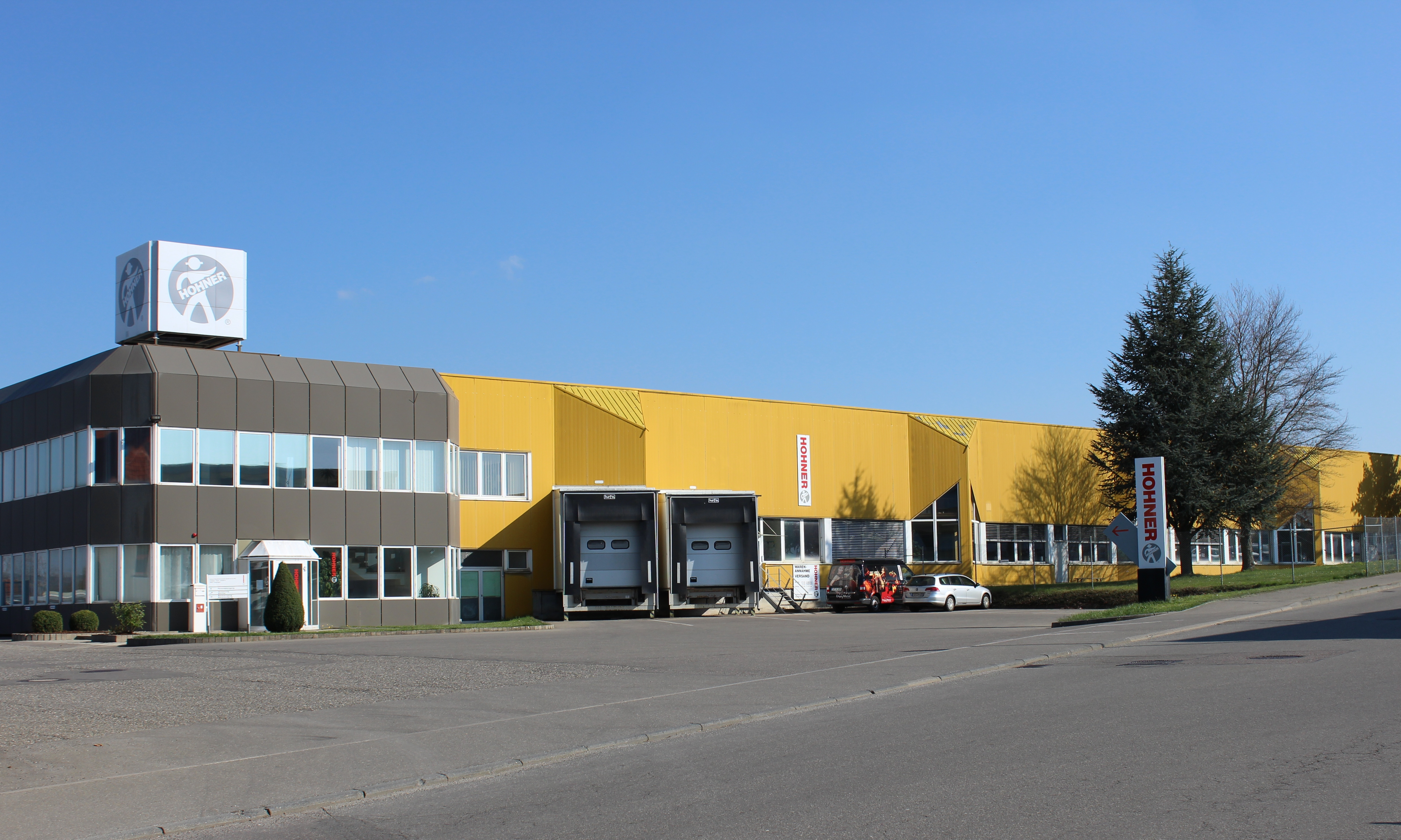
The company headquarters in Trossingen

In 1964 Hohner released "The Beatles Harmonica Kit" which was sold in a blister package, much like most Hohner harmonicas nowadays, retailed for $2.95, and helped what Hohner calls "bring about a new popularity upsurge of the Hohner harmonica on both sides of the Atlantic.".

Matthias Karl Eduard Hohner, son of Dipl.-Ing. Matthias Julius Hohner 21.12.1898 - 27.12.1977 and a direct descendant in fourth generation and name bearer of the founder Matthias Hohner, was one of the last members of the Hohner dynasty involved in managing the family business, he worked since 1968 at the company and in the 1980s he became the president till 1986 when he left the company. His son Matthias Francisco Hohner belonged to the first generation of direct descendants who did not enter into the family business. Many direct descendants of the founder are still active as members of the "Deutsches Harmonika Museum" and the "Hohner'sche Familienverein".

In 1989, a controlling interest in Hohner was acquired by Kunz-Holding GmbH & Co., a German wood products manufacturer. Kunz obtained 67 percent of the public firm, with the Hohner family retaining an 8 percent stake.

In 1997, the Taiwanese company KHS Musical Instruments bought a majority holding in Hohner from Kunz via the Tortola based HS Investments Group. The company returned to profitability in 2001, after more than 20 years of losses. By 2012, HS Investments Group held a 75% stake in Hohner.

== Diatonic harmonicas ==
=== Marine Band ===
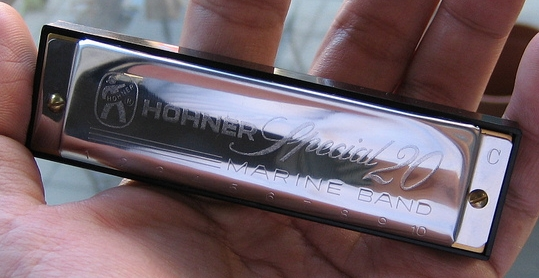
Special 20 Marine Band

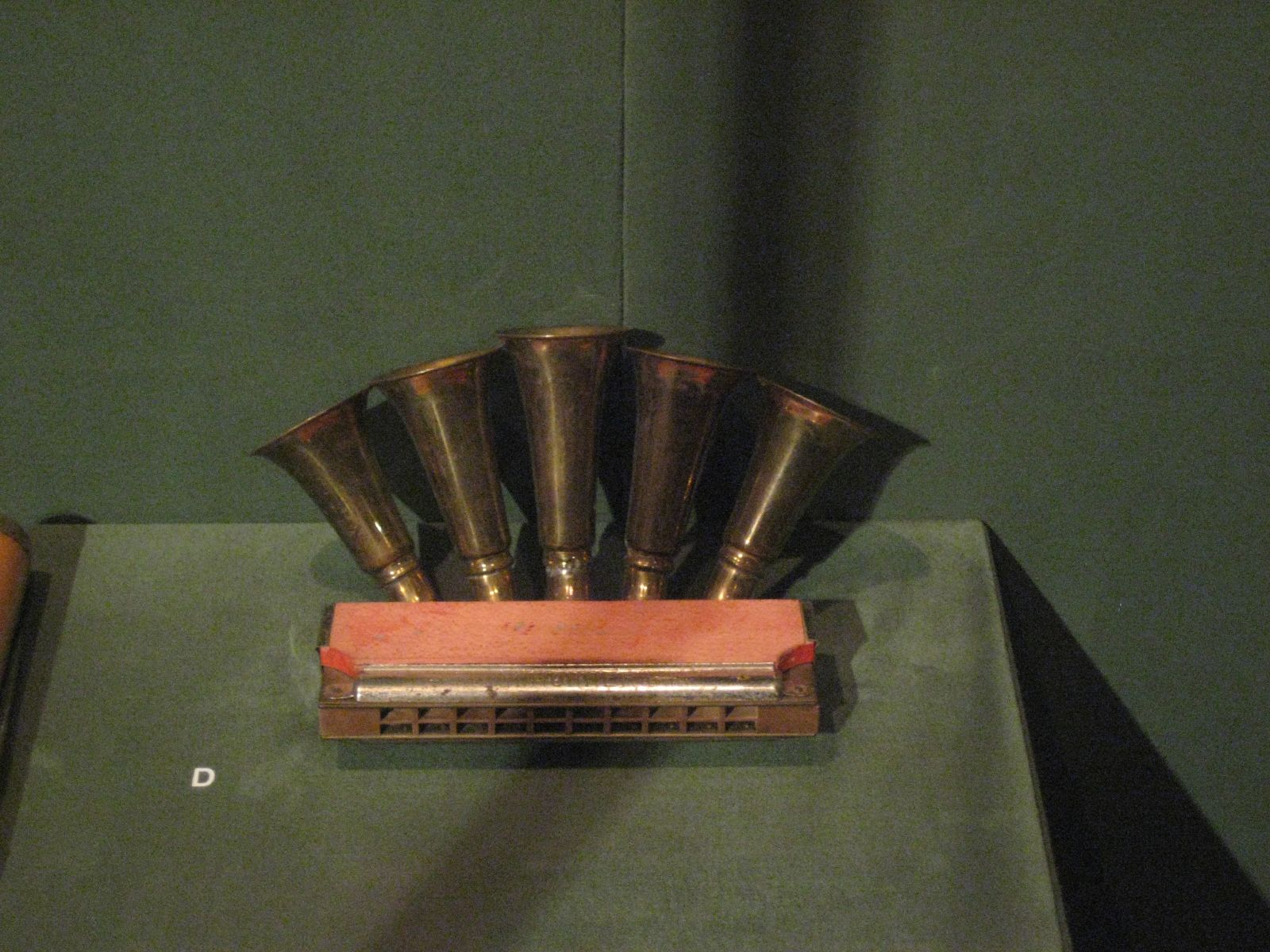
M. Hohner Trumpet Call Harmonica (1906)

"The Marine Band" is the base model of the line. Technically named the Marine Band 1896/20 for the year it was introduced and the twenty reeds it possesses, it has been the basis of a number of Hohner's harmonicas over the years. It also has some tuning variations like the 1896N (natural minor key) and the 1896H (harmonic minor key).

The Marine Band has been Hohner's most popular model of harmonica for generations. Made in Germany on a wood comb, most blues and rock artists play a Marine Band. Several noted users are Bob Dylan, Brian Jones, John Lennon, Bruce Springsteen, Little Walter and Neil Young. There are various subdivisions of the Marine Band.

The Special 20 (#560) was introduced in the mid-1970s. It has the same reeds as a Marine Band, but it has a plastic comb instead of a wooden comb, and rounded edges. It was the first Hohner harmonica to have a plastic comb, which not only made the instrument more airtight, but also eliminated the swelling wood combs go through as they moisten from use. Made in Germany, this model quickly became the preferred choice of many rock and blues players. Now, most harmonicas being manufactured from all companies are based upon the Special 20. Its most noted user is John Popper, who appears on the blister. Like the 1896, the Special 20 also has tuning variations available, like the #560C in country styled tuning, and the #560N in natural minor.

The Marine Band Deluxe has all the features of the original Marine Band with tighter construction and a new cover design which creates a greater volume.

The Marine Band Crossover also features the same reeds, but is made on a bamboo comb that is water repellent.

The Marine Band Thunderbird is a model of low and super-low pitched 10-hole diatonic harmonica that was introduced in 2011. It possesses a bamboo comb like the Crossover, and a conical shaped lower cover plate. Designed by noted harmonica player and customizer Joe Filisko, this plate helps reduce any rattle caused by the low frequency tone produced by the reeds. It is available in low major keys A through F, as well as low B-flat and E-flat, and double-low F.

The Marine Band 364 has twelve holes and is available is the natural keys of C, G, and D only.

The Marine Band 365 has fourteen holes and is available in keys C and G only.

The Marine Band Soloist (364s) is the same as a twelve-hole chromatic harmonica without a button. Available in key of C.

The Marine Band 365 Steve Baker Special (365/28 SBS) possesses the same construction as the original 365, but with low pitched tuning to their natural major keys, available in C, D, G, A, and F. It is named for, and was developed in part by noted harmonicist Steve Baker, who resides in Germany and has contributed to the design of several other Hohner harmonica models, including the Marine Bands Deluxe and Crossover.

The Marine Band Octave has two rows of reeds tuned an octave apart. Available in the keys of C and G.

=== Modular harmonica system ===
In the mid-1990s, responding to the competing new Lee Oskar Harmonica System by Tombo, Hohner introduced an interchangeably parted series known as the Modular System, usually abbreviated MS. Over the years, several harps have been added to this system.

The Blues Harp has been around since the early 1970s. Until the 1990s, it was functionally identical to the Marine Band, the only differences being the cover plates and the varnish on the front of the wood comb, and the Blues Harp's profile was thinner as well. At one point, Johnny Cash promoted the Blues Harp. In the 1990s, Hohner made the Blues Harp part of its Modular System (MS) line. This new Blues Harp lost its uniqueness, and is interchangeable with the other models in the MS line, but it currently remains the standby of many players who use MS harps.

The Pro Harp features lacquer-coated cover plates with a glossy black finish and a plastic comb. Since its inception, it has become a very popular model among rock and roll players. The Pro Harp was another model that was in Hohner's handmade line of harmonicas, and was later adapted to the modular system.

The Cross Harp was a nearly identical model to the Pro Harp with the exception of a wood comb and slightly thicker original reed plates. The black coverplate coating was greblon. It was discontinued in 2011.

The Big River Harp was introduced as a less expensive alternative to the Blues Harp. It is favored among beginner harmonicists, although many experienced players also prefer the Big River for its higher natural volume. It features a plastic comb and bare metal cover plates.

The Blue Midnight was released in 2011 with a limit to the key of C, also on the less expensive side of the market. It features stainless steel cover plates with a wider back gap for enhanced volume while playing. The unique feature of this harp is the comb, which is made out of translucent blue plastic. The comb allows for brighter tone than the black combed models. It also has a special just intonation (JI) "Chicago tuning". It is also now available in other keys.

The 225 - Deuce and a Quarter was a limited edition harmonica on the modular system that was put out in 2007 and 2008. It was made on a black plastic comb, with chrome-plated reedplates, and black powder-coated coverplates with art resembling a vintage car's hood-emblem. It was available only in the key of A.

The Meisterklasse is a high-end harmonica featuring chrome-plated cover plates, an anodized aluminium comb, and extra thick 1.05mm nickel-plated reeds. Originally issued as a more compact, unique model, the revised version (still carrying the same 580 model number) is now on the modular system, made in Germany. One other feature that sets the Meisterklasse apart from most other Hohner harmonicas are its full-length cover plates, which extend all the way to the ends of the harmonica's comb rather than sharply angling down before the ends to form an adjoining surface parallel to the reedplates and comb. The only other Hohner harmonica possessing this quality is the curve-framed Golden Melody.

=== Other diatonic harmonica models ===
The Old Standby is another model beloved by generations of harmonica players. Up until the 1990s, this model was a quality instrument made in Germany on a wood comb. Where the Marine Band was the choice of blues players, many country music players such as Charlie McCoy preferred the Old Standby. In the 1990s, Hohner began manufacturing this model in China on a plastic comb with a significant decrease in quality. Among harmonica fans the downgrade remains unpopular.

Golden Melody, designed by Frank and Cham-Ber Huang, has a curved shape. This German-made, plastic-comb model has a slightly different tuning (equal temperament) than other diatonic harmonicas, making the Golden Melody better suited for playing single-note melodies and solos.

The XB-40, (short for Extreme bending-40 reeds), is unlike any other diatonic made. Released in 2003, it was specifically designed by harmonica specialist Rick Epping to simplify proficient bending of the notes. To make this possible, the XB-40 uses forty reeds as opposed to the usual twenty found in most ten-hole diatonics. With these bending capabilities, the XB-40 gives access to all the notes on the chromatic scale through bending the natural tones of each hole. This model was discontinued in 2013. Shortly before production officially ceased, Suzuki Music released a similar model the SUB-30.

The American Ace has been a popular choice as a beginner's harmonica for decades. Originally made in Ireland on a wood comb, this model is currently being made in China on a plastic comb.

The Pocket Pal is a recent addition to the Hohner standard line of harmonicas. It is somewhat unusual because it is slightly shorter in length than most harmonicas, leading to its namesake of being pocket handy. It is Chinese made, which is unfavorable to most harmonica players, but the Pocket Pal has caught on as an inexpensive, yet quality harp. Like the Old Standby, the Pocket Pal is designed for use in country music.

38C, also known as the Mini Harp, is Hohner's least expensive model. With four holes, the 38C plays a single octave in the key of C. Like other budget harmonicas, the 38C is manufactured in China with a plastic comb.

The Little Lady is very similar to the 38C, but on a pearwood comb and with different cover plate art. It is technically a playable harmonica, but it is generally regarded as a knick-knack piece that can be used as personal jewelry. It is also available as a keychain. The Little Lady holds the distinction of being the first musical instrument to be played in outer space.

== Other harmonica types ==
In addition to diatonic harmonicas Hohner also produces other types such as chromatic and tremolo harmonicas.

=== Chromatic ===
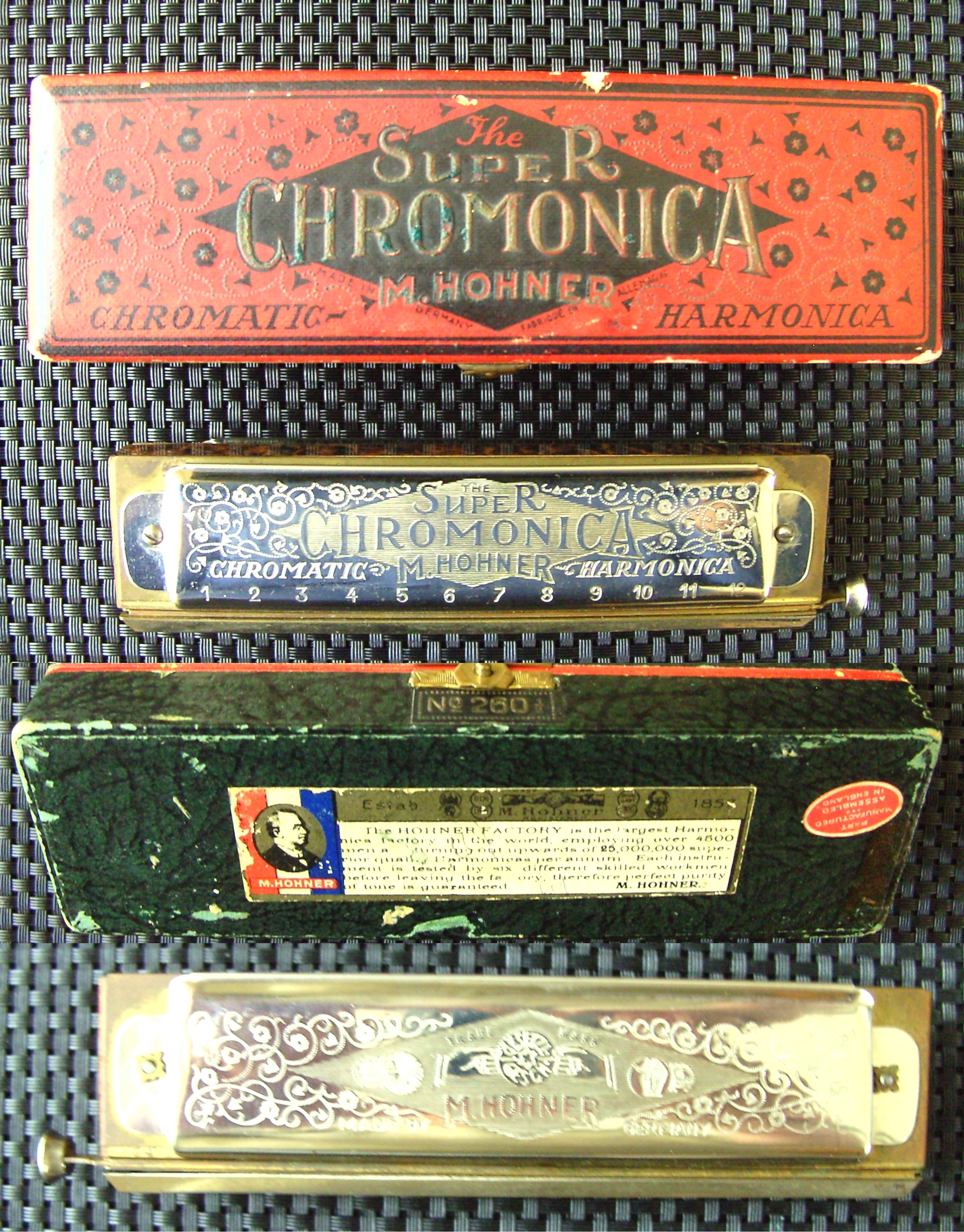
Hohner "Super Chromonica"; case marked "No.260 1/2" (model); images top-to-bottom show the case top, harmonica top, case bottom, and harmonica bottom/obverse

The Chromonica, no longer in production, contained forty reeds and played 2½ full chromatic octaves. This was the original Hohner chromatic model, available until recently in C or G.

The Discovery 48 an entry level chromatic harmonica, aimed at beginners. Contains forty-eight reeds featuring full length cover plates, the same 1.2mm reeds found in the deluxe and a reversible mouth piece.

There is also a Super Chromonica 270 which contains forty-eight reeds and spans three octaves.

The Super Chromonica 270 Deluxe is an updated improvement on the Super Chromonica, featuring tighter reedplate fixtures, thicker reedplates, round holes in its chrome-plated mouthpiece, a smoother slide mechanism which can be remounted for left-handed use, and a round-edged comb for more comfortable holding. The Deluxe is also available with a gold-plated mouthpiece and coverplates, known as the Super Chromonica Gold.

The Educator 10 is a 10-hole, 40-reed chromatic harmonica built on a plastic comb. It is designed without the valve or windsaver technology found in many other chromatics, and because of its ten holes, it is smaller than most chromatics. This makes it a simple and inexpensive chromatic, ideal both for novices and for experienced diatonic players making the transition from the smaller 10-hole harmonicas. Like the Chromonica, it plays 2 1/2 full octaves.

The Koch Chromatic and Slide Harp are both designed in the same fashion as chromatic harmonicas, but possess the Richter tuning found in typical 10-hole diatonic harmonicas. Like the Educator 10, both are also 10-hole and built on a pearwood comb. The Slide Harp has been discontinued.

The 64 Chromonica is a four-full-octave harmonica in the key of C. With 64 reeds on a plastic comb, it boasts an extra octave below the middle-C note, giving it an accentuated versatility.

The CX-12 is a 12-hole, 48-reed chromatic, uniquely designed with a one-piece plastic housing and a more ergonomic slide button. It is available in several keys including a tenor-C. The standard model is charcoal black in color, but a gold colored one is available in the key of C only. A variant of the CX-12, the CX-12 Jazz, has slightly different outer body features for better ergonomics, a red and gold colored housing, and higher reed offsets which aid in better tone for jazz harmonica players.

The Meisterklasse chromatic is a very high-end model (7565). It is Hohner's premium 14-hole chromatic (56 notes). Like its diatonic sibling, it features an anodized aluminum comb, and chrome-plated brass cover plates and mouthpiece. The cover plates extend the length of the comb. Essentially, it looks like a bigger version of the original diatonic Meisterklasse introduced in the 1980s (but which was later revised for the MS series reed plates).

=== Tremolo ===
On tremolo harmonicas each channel has two reeds for each note, i.e. one pair for blown notes and another pair for drawn ones, each pair tuned slightly apart from one another to produce a tremolo sound.

The most popular models are either single-sided or double-sided Echo harps, but the single-sided ones can be combined into quadruple or sextuple 'corncob' setups, with a different key on each row.

=== Chord ===
The Chord Harmonica consists of two harmonicas hinged together. Together, they are capable of playing 48 chords. They are 23 inches long, and each chord takes up 4 holes. The chord harmonica is used to provide chordal and rhythmic backing in an ensemble, much as rhythm guitar might do. Jerry Murad's Harmonicat's 1947 "Peg O' My Heart" was played on a Chord, with a cleverly arranged sequence of chords that produced the impression of a melody. Hohner's main Chord is known as the Hohner 48, because it plays 48 chords. Hohner from the 1930s to the late 1960s also produced the Polyphonia No. 8, which played 36 blow-only chords, in three rows. The concept failed and is often frowned upon by professional 48 chord players.

=== 150th anniversary and beyond ===
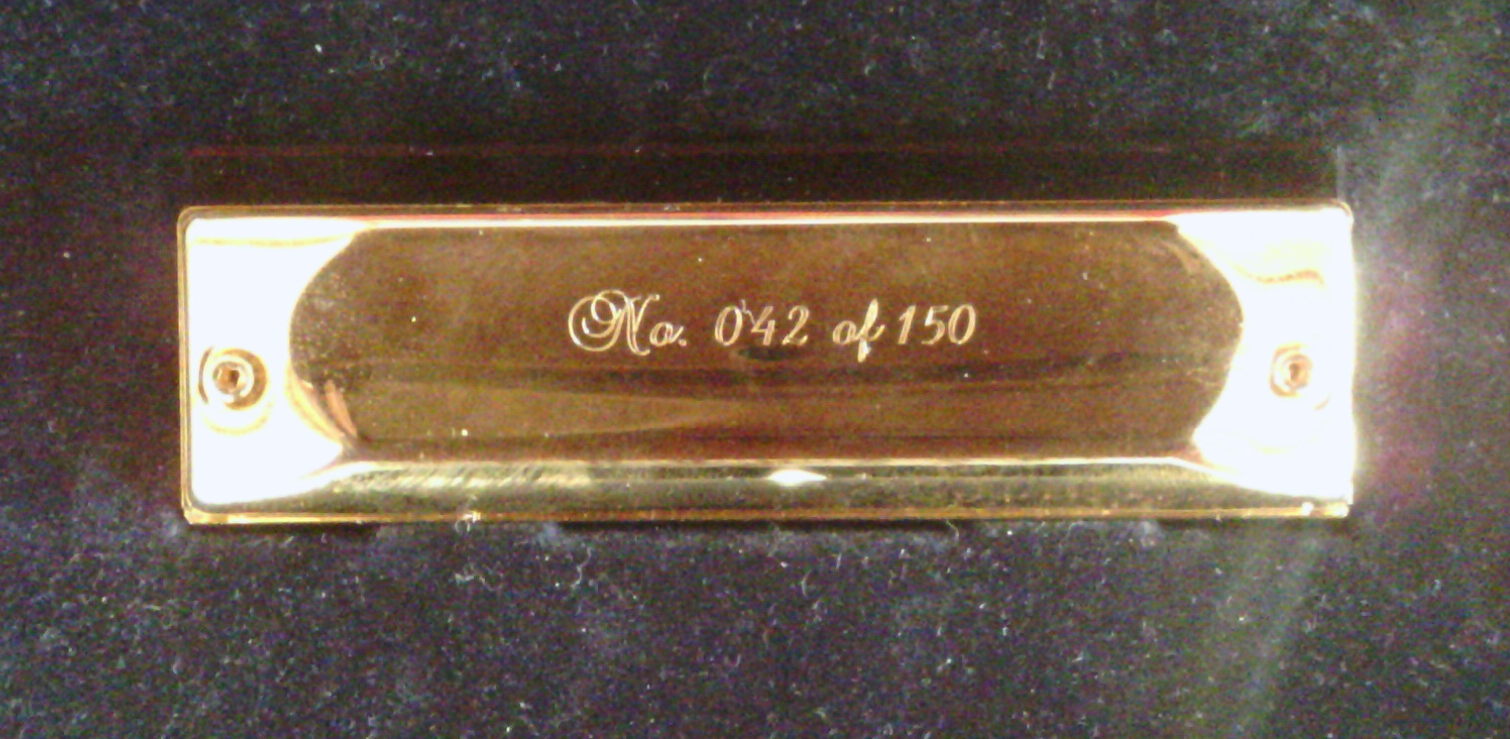
150 Anniversary Gold 42 of 150

For Hohner's 150th anniversary in 2007, the company began manufacturing Limited Edition Diatonic harmonicas all tuned to the key of C major only.

- Gold limited to 150 pieces.
- Chrome limited to 1,857 pieces.
- Standard Edition

The "Gold Edition" harmonica is based upon the MS reed plates. It features a crystal glass comb and engraved gold-plated cover plates. The bottom cover plate has the serial numbers from 1 to 150. It is packaged in a leather case with an anniversary booklet.

The "Chrome Edition" harmonica is also based upon the MS reed plates. Featuring a crystal glass comb and specially engraved chrome-plated anniversary cover plates. The bottom cover plate has the serial numbers from 1 to 1857. It is also packaged with an anniversary booklet. The "Standard Edition" model features a clear acrylic comb and the top cover plate is specially engraved.

The "Standard Edition" model is presented in 12 piece wooden anniversary boxes.

== Artist series harmonicas ==
Hohner has several harmonicas designed by several famous harmonica players.

=== Larry Adler ===
Classical harmonica player Larry Adler had his own harmonica series, still produced by the company, which were chromatic with either 12 or 16 holes.

=== Toots Thielemans ===
Jazz player Toots Thielemans also has a chromatic harmonica line with two types being Mellow Tone (for classical material) and Hard Bopper (for contemporary material).

=== Stevie Wonder ===
Stevie Wonder, plays both Hohner the 64 Chromonica and Super 64 with four-octave range on all his records since the 1960s.

=== Steven Tyler ===
Aerosmith's front man Steven Tyler has two types of diatonic harmonicas. An Artist Series and a Signature Series with the latter being more expensive.

=== Bob Dylan ===
Folk musician Bob Dylan also has a Signature Series diatonic harmonica as well as a Collection which features seven harmonicas.

== Guitars ==
Hohner guitars

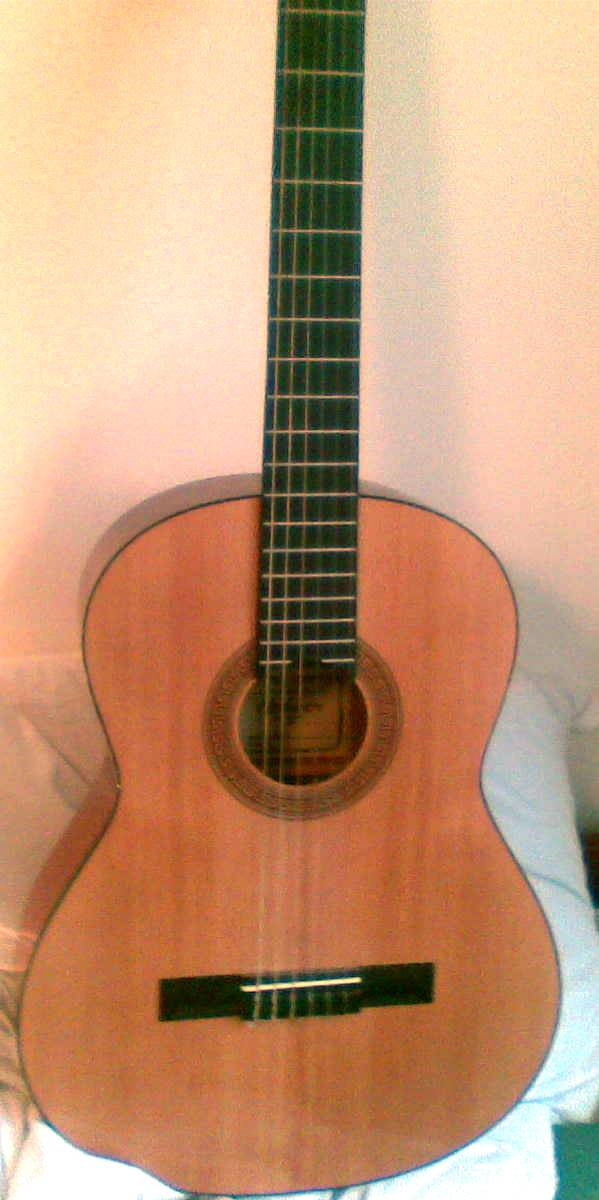
Classical guitar

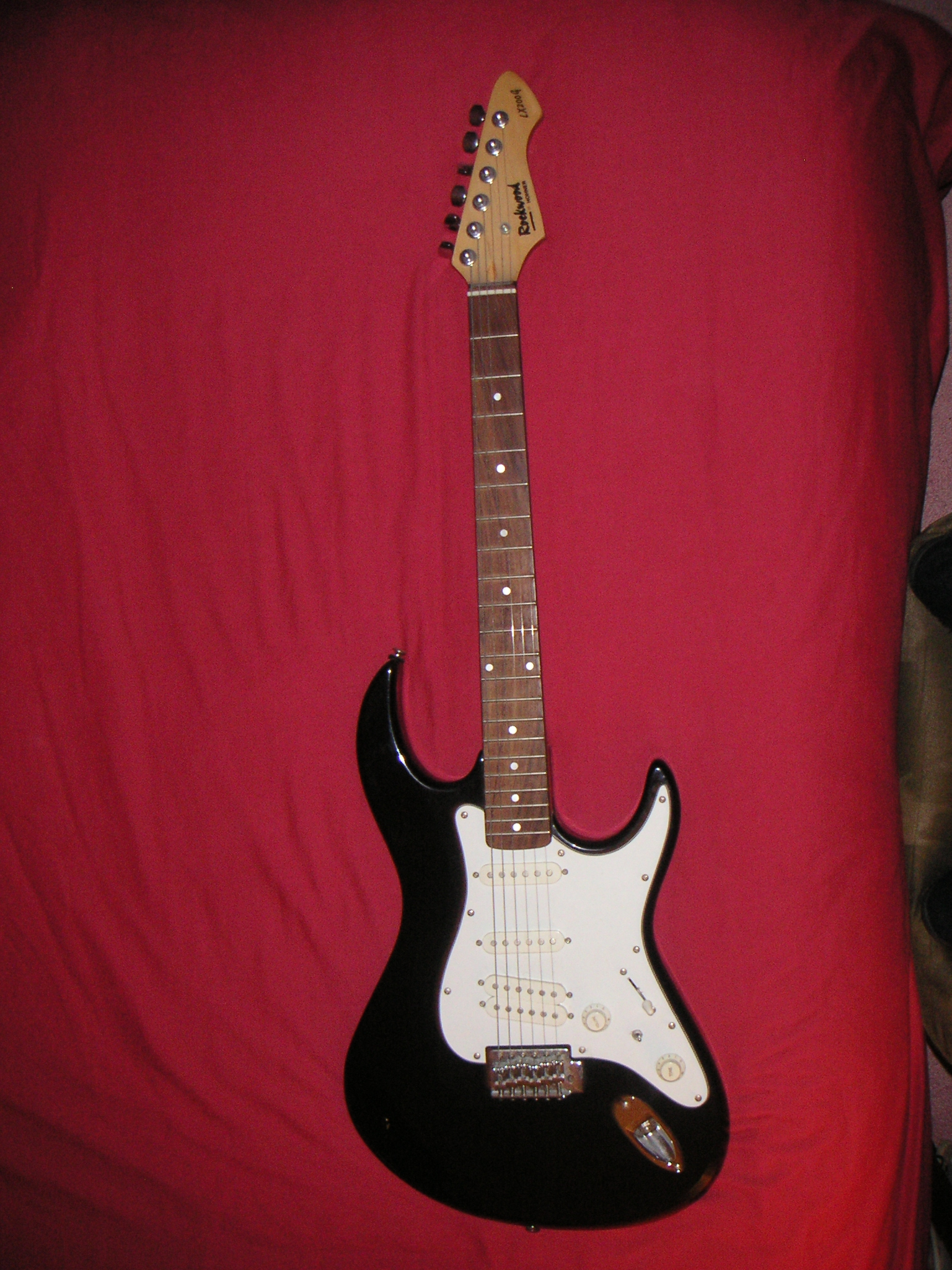
Hohner Rockwood electric guitar

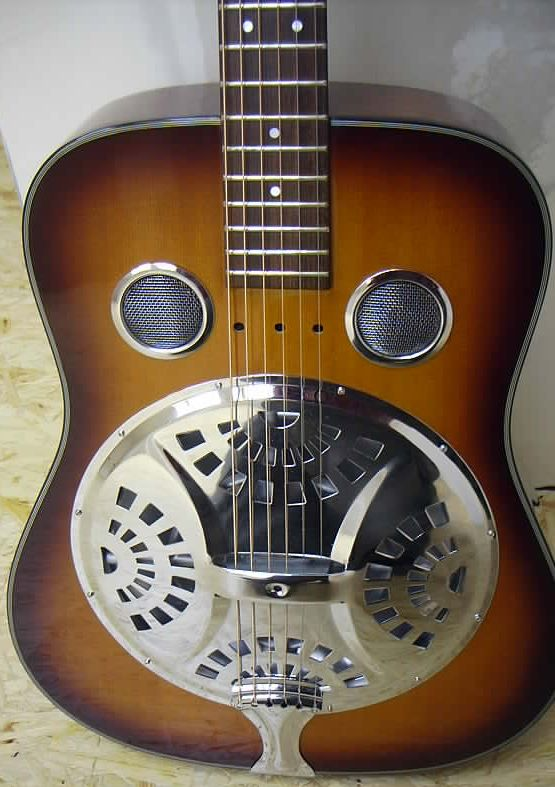
Resonator guitar

Guitars were produced under the Hohner name from the late 1950s until around 2015 when the company withdrew from the guitar market. During that period, guitars were commissioned or designed by several of the Hohner companies including those in Germany, USA, United Kingdom and France.

=== History of guitar production ===
The earliest documented Hohner guitars were made for Hohner London (the trading name of the UK subsidiary M. Hohner Ltd.) around 1960. The first guitars were named after London districts (Kingsway, Farringdon) with a second run of guitars having more exotic names (Amazon, Zambezi). By 1962, Hohner London focussed on distributing Kay guitars and production of their own guitars petered out.

The US subsidiary M. Hohner Inc had an existing relationship with the Sano Corporation of New Jersey to make accordion amplifiers under the brand name Contessa. In the 1960s, Sano also imported Zerosette guitars from Italy and they started to be badged as Contessa for sale by Hohner. By the late 1960s, a range of solid body, semi-acoustic and acoustic Contessa guitars were being offered in the US and Europe. Guitars were sourced or commissioned from manufacturers including Eko, Framus and others. Steve Vai's first guitar was a Contessa HG-200.

During the early 1970s, production of especially classical and folk guitars continued under the Contessa, Contessa By Hohner and Hohner Contessa names. By 1974 (and probably much earlier) at least some guitars were being sourced from Japan. In 1974, M. Hohner Inc. registered Hohner International as a trademark for use on musical instruments. The Contessa name was dropped with the exception of a small number of classical guitars. From 1975, most guitars had the Hohner name on the headstock and Hohner International branding on the soundhole label of acoustic guitars. Guitars were then produced under the Hohner brand from around 1975 to 2015, when Hohner withdrew completely from the guitar market.

By 1975, guitar production was entirely in Japan. Around 1976, the 300 Limited Edition series and the 700 series acoustic guitars were added to an expanded range of classical, folk, concert and dreadnought guitars. In 1977, a range of electric guitars was introduced consisting mainly of replicas of popular Fender and Gibson guitar and bass models. Some electric guitars were made at the Moridaira factory in Matsumoto, some acoustic guitars were made at the Terada factory, with the remainder made by unidentified factories.

Some acoustic guitar production started to move to Korea as early as 1978 although electric guitar production remained in Japan until at least 1983. By 1985, new ranges of Korean made electric guitars were introduced - the budget SE range (known as the Arbor Series in the United Kingdom) consisting mostly of Fender and Gibson copies; and the Professional range which included headless basses and guitars based on technology licensed from Ned Steinberger as well as the ST (Stratocaster and Superstrat style guitars), TE (Telecaster style guitars, including reissues of the Prince guitar), and L (Les Paul style guitars) models which would form the core of the Professional range for years to come. These guitars were made at the Cor-Tek factory in South Korea, more commonly referred to by their in-house brand Cort Guitars.

In 1990, the English guitar maker Alan Entwistle joined Hohner UK bringing his ATN tone shaping circuitry. In 1991, this was incorporated into the existing ST59 model as the ST59-ATN and into a new model, the JT60-ATN. The popularity of these models allowed Hohner UK to influence guitar production for the next few years, introducing the Revelation series of guitars which were designed in the UK and made at the Delicia factory near Prague and in 1994 setting up a Hohner Custom Shop in Bedwas to produce made to order variations of guitars. To differentiate budget models from the Professional Series and other higher end guitars, the brand Rockwood by Hohner was introduced in the mid-1990s.

=== Notable guitar models ===
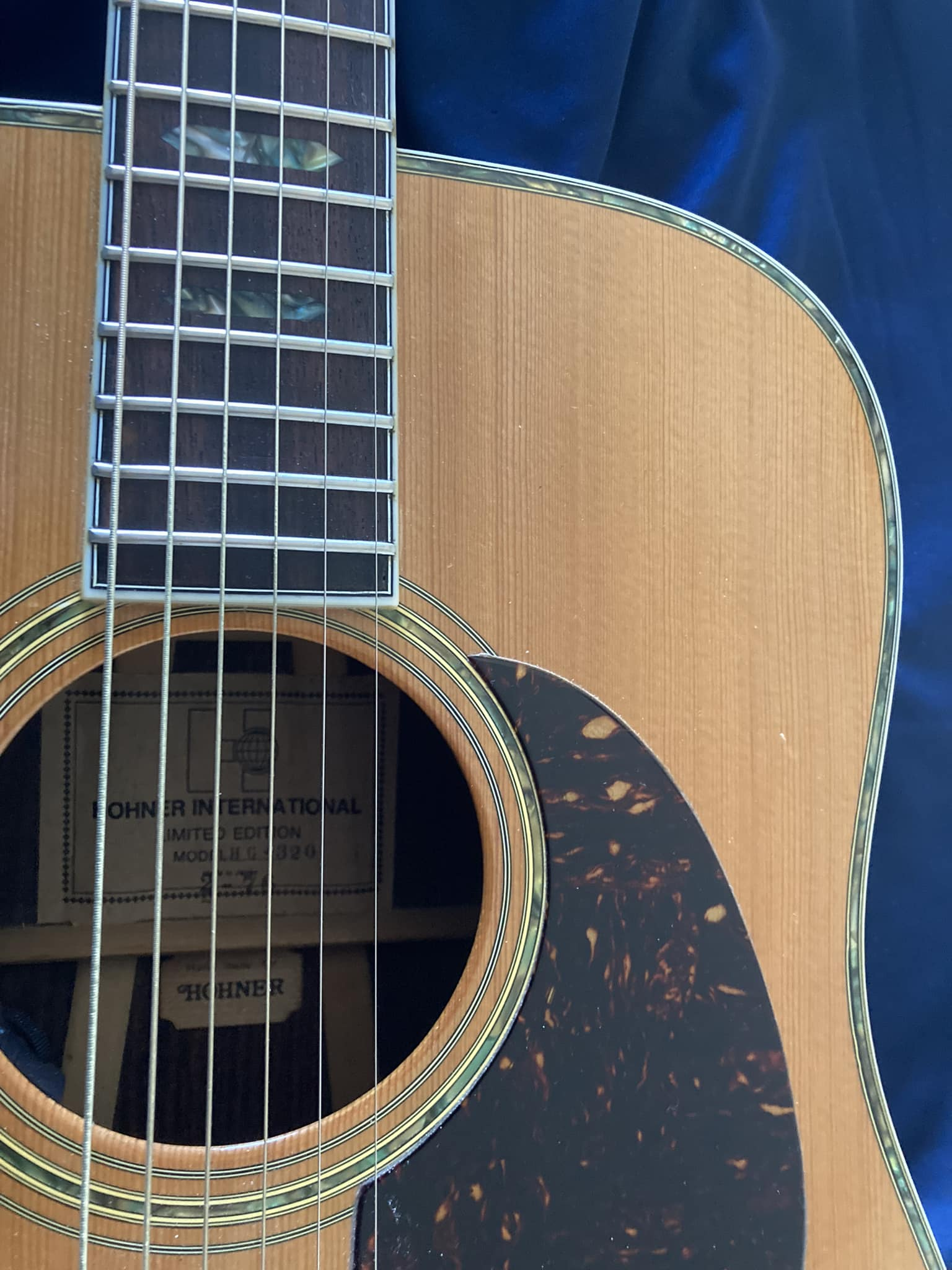
Hohner HG-320

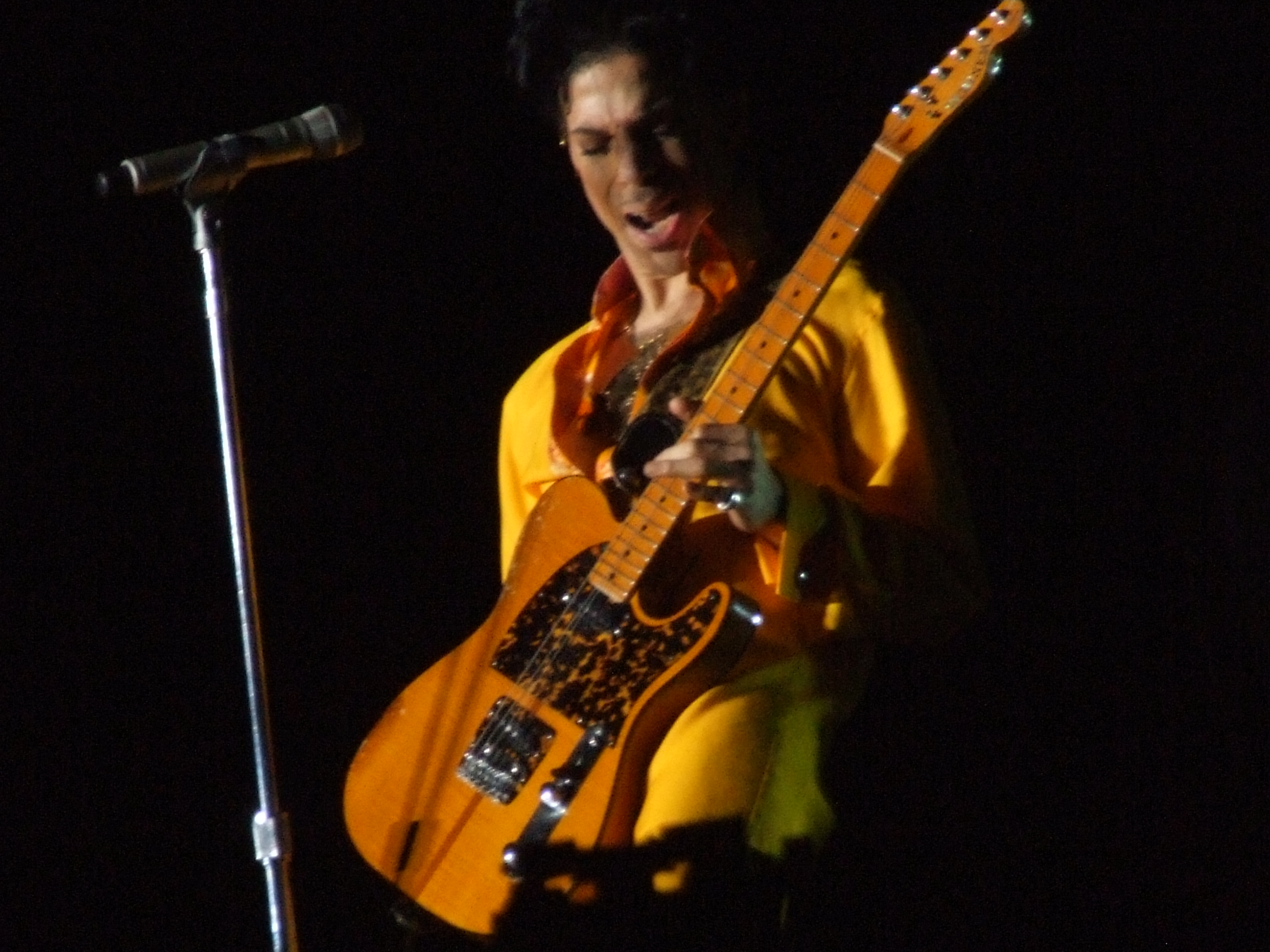
Prince with HG-490 Mad Cat

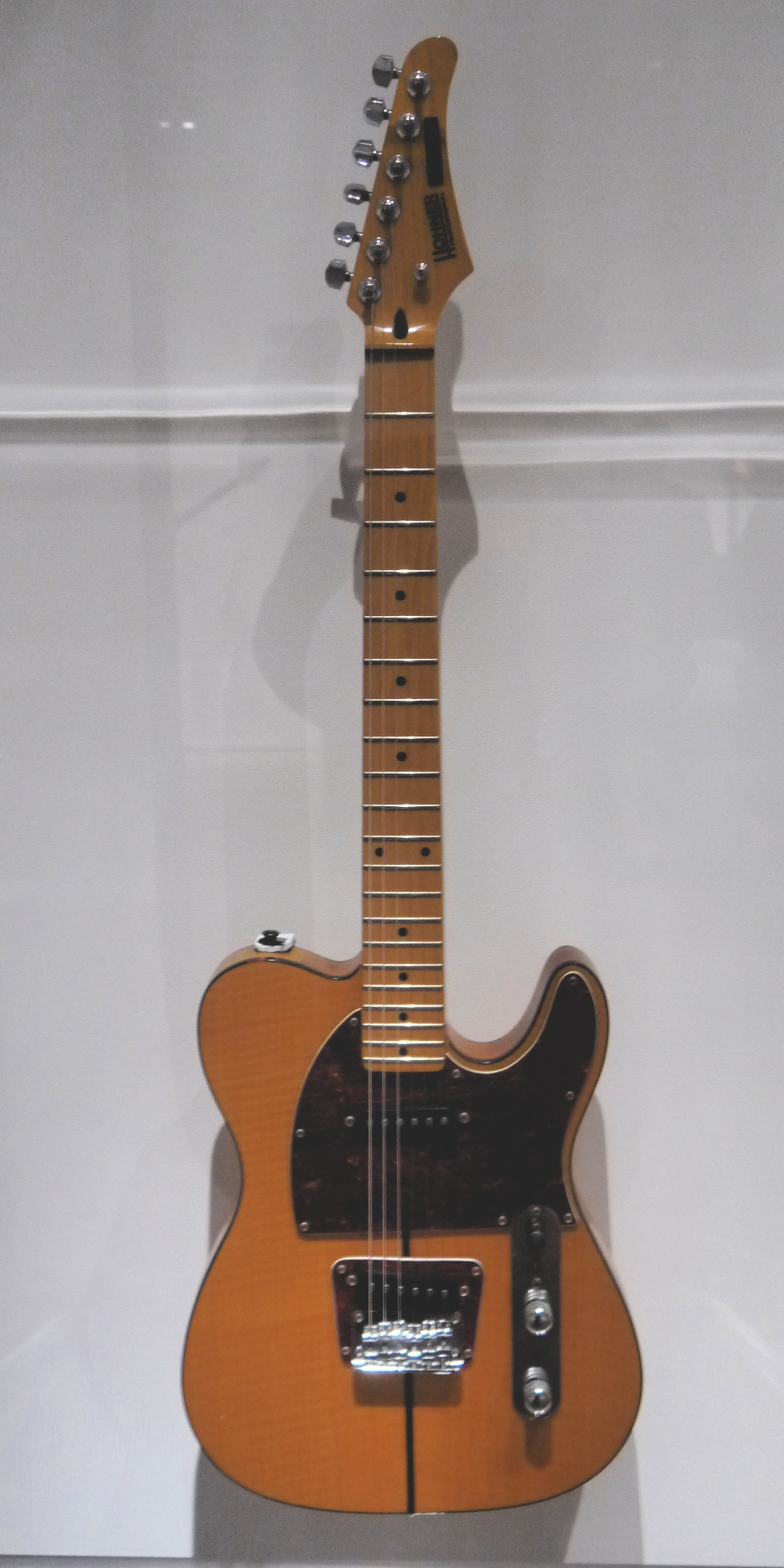
The Prinz

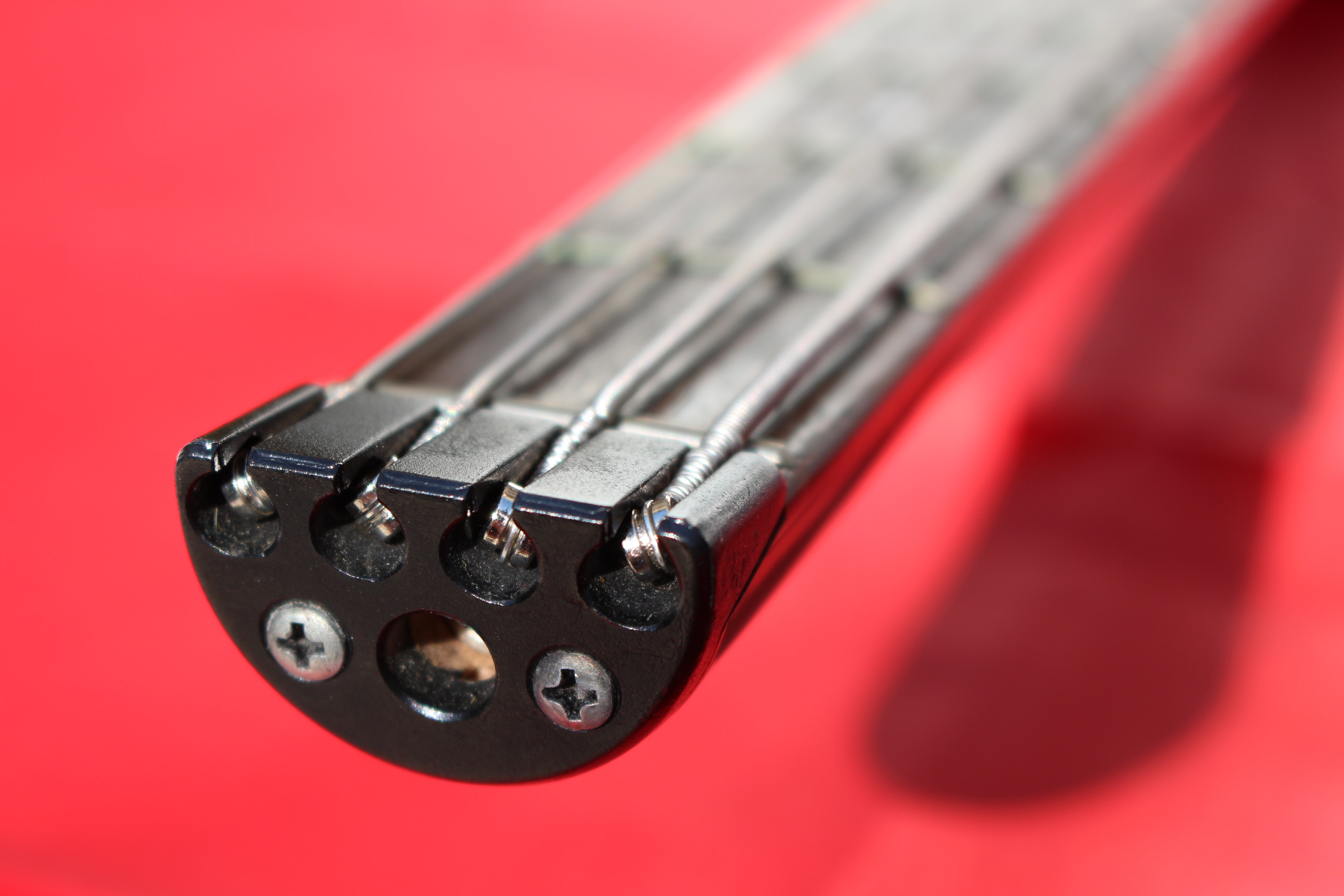
B2A head

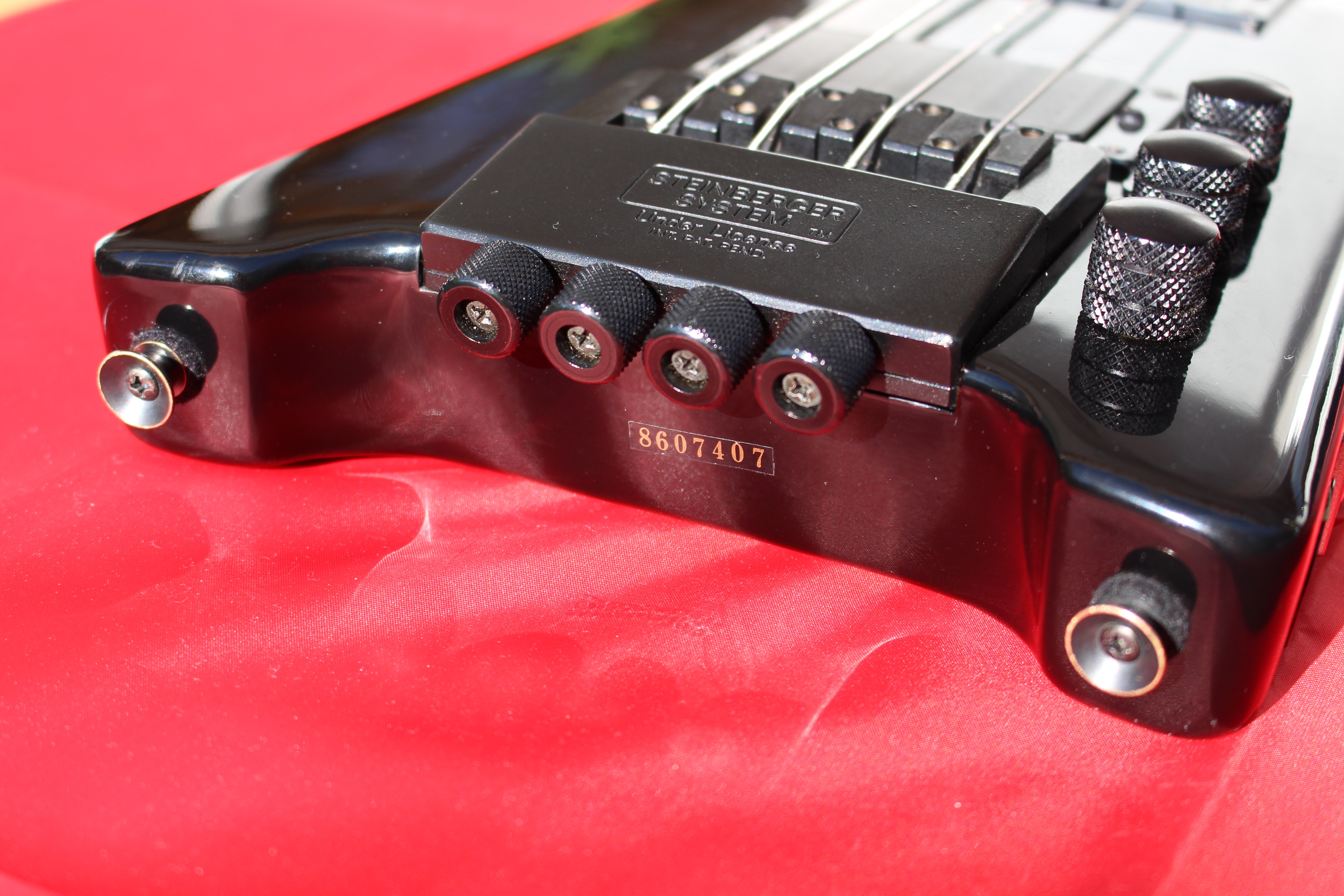
B2A bridge

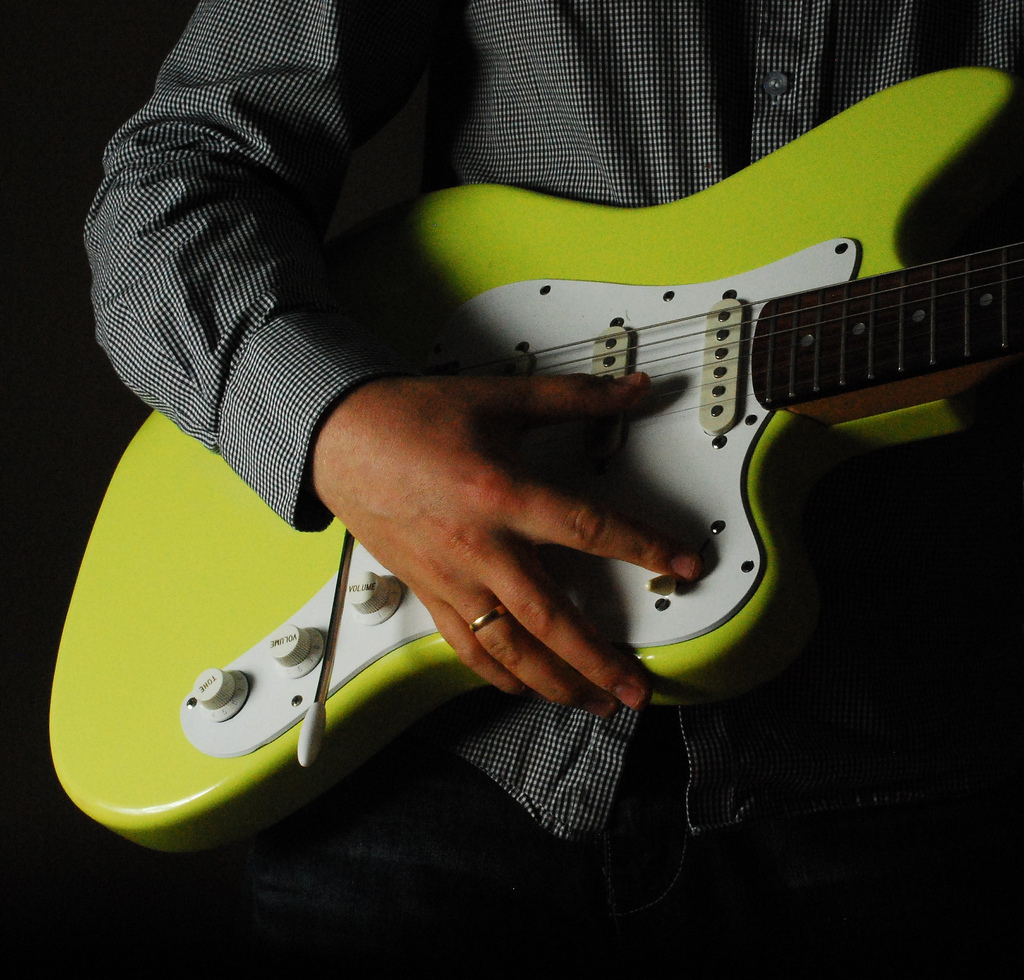
Hohner JT60

==== Hohner London Kingsway (1960) ====
This is probably the earliest Hohner guitar, dating to the second half of 1960. It features a hollow construction, a birch neck and a single pickup. The pickups and electrics were made by the Weill company who had previously worked with Burns London and assembly was probably by Stuart Darkins, a furniture manufacturing company.

==== HG-320 Limited Edition (1975) ====
The HG-320 was part of the Limited Edition Series of acoustic guitars introduced in 1975 and produced till the early 1980s. It is a dreadnought guitar and the design closely resembles that of a Martin D-41. The guitars were made in Japan and all featured solid spruce tops, rosewood or maple backs, and highly decorative inlays and marquetry. Later models were probably made at the Terada factory but the earliest guitars show some differences and could have been made by smaller luthier shops.

==== HG-490 (1977) ====
The HG-490 was a version of the HS Anderson HS-1 Mad Cat made for Hohner by the Moridaira/Morris factory in Japan around 1977. They were largely a copy of a Fender Telecaster in configuration, but the body is an unusual construction using a Birds' eye maple cap either side of a walnut strip and the guitar has decorative binding and leopard print pickguards. They sold for around 80,000 yen or $800.

Musician Prince bought a Hohner HG-490 guitar in the late 1970s and it was said to have been his favourite guitar. Although very few original models were made, Hohner and others have since made many other versions starting in the early 1980s. Hohner reissues include Hohner THE Prinz, Hohner TE Prinz and Hohner The Artist HTA490.

Prince himself had multiple luthier copies of the guitar made, some of them indistinguishable from the original. As such, it's difficult to be definitive about when he was using an actual Hohner guitar.

==== B2 (1985) ====
The Hohner Professional B2 was a headless bass introduced in 1985. It used a bridge licensed from Steinberger and was available with passive or active pickups, the latter designated B2A, as well as a five-string active version designated B2AV. The B2 proved a popular alternative to the much more expensive Steinberger headless basses and remained in production until at least 2012.

==== JT60 "Hollywood" (1991) ====
The JT60 was designed in the UK but produced in Korea from 1991 to around 1996 and was an offset guitar similar to a Fender Jaguar but with a Fender Stratocaster pickup and control layout. It was designed by Alan Entwistle, who had recently joined Hohner UK, and features Entwistle's own ATN tone circuitry to emulate different guitar types. The first production models were displayed at the British Music Fair in June 1991 where orders for it greatly outstripped those of the more conventionally Stratocaster-shaped ST59 ATN model which had been produced because of fears that the JT60 was too unconventionally shaped.

== Accordions ==
Hohner accordions

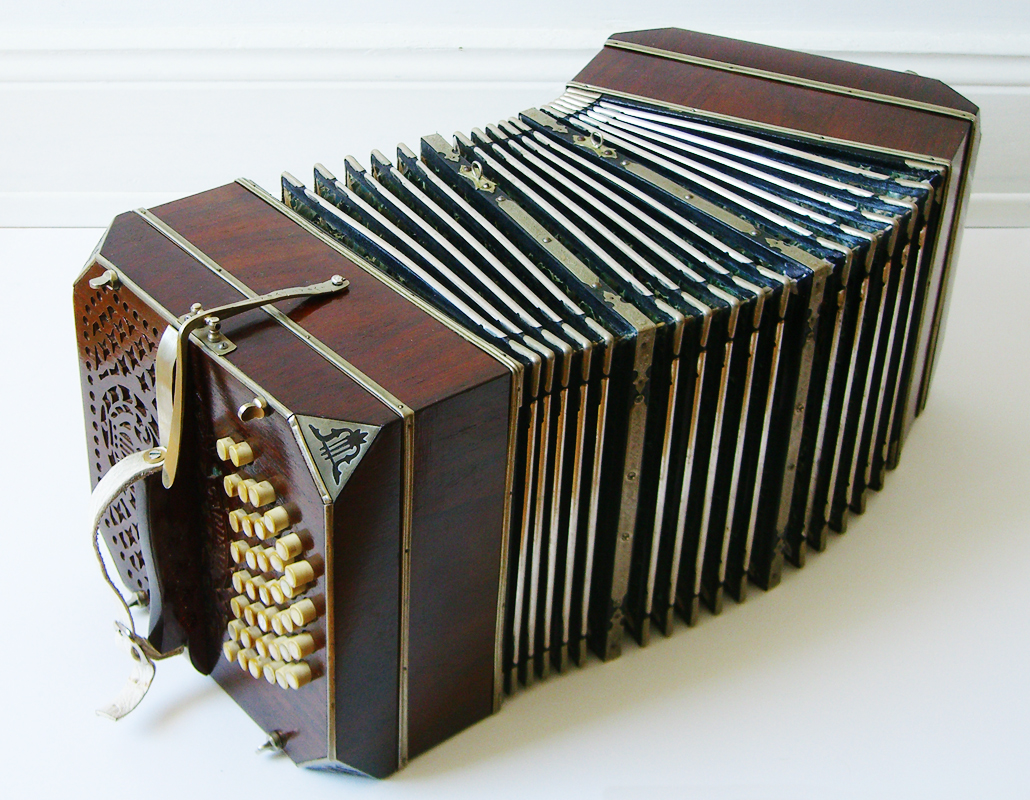
Bandoneon

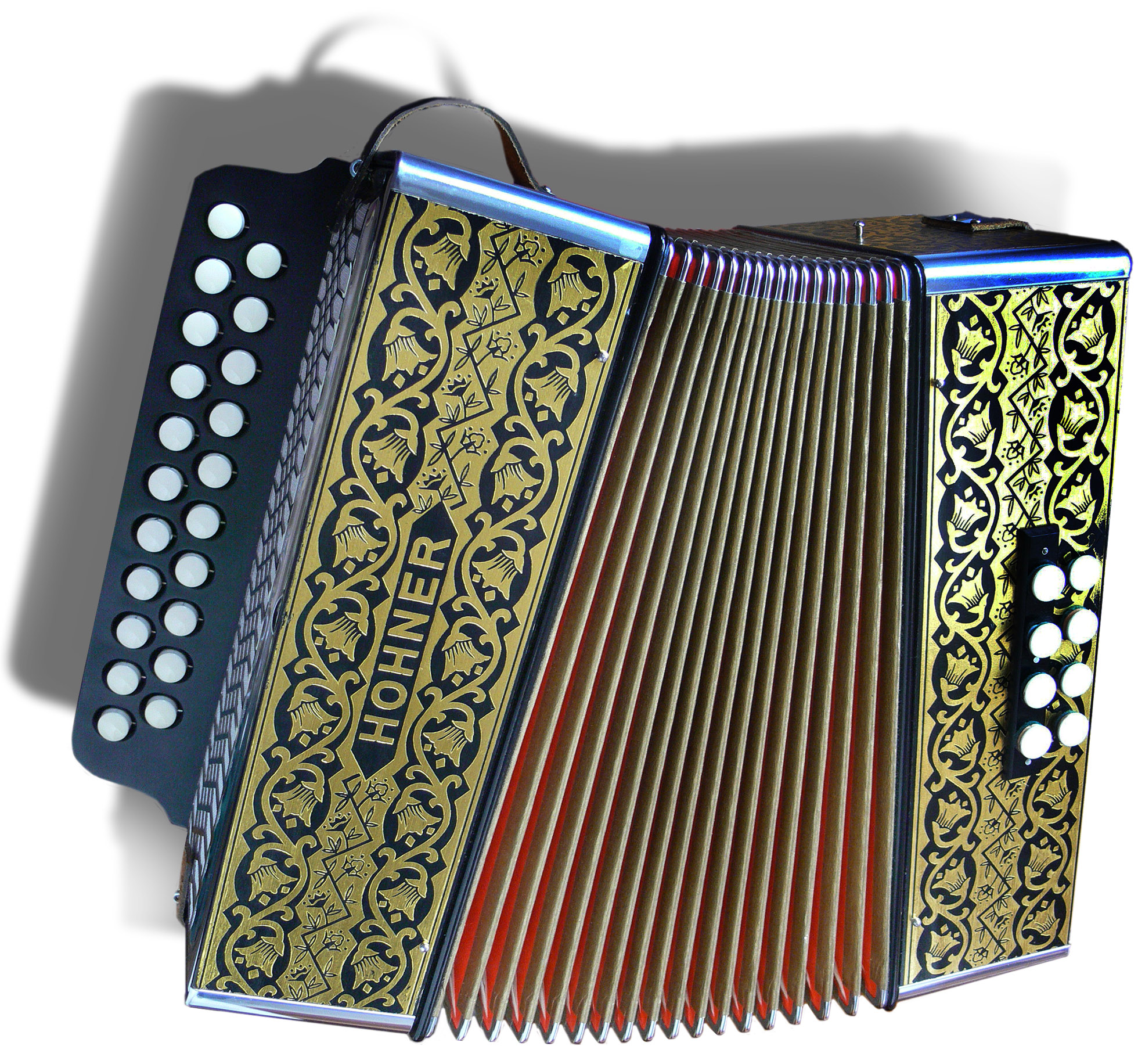
Melodeon

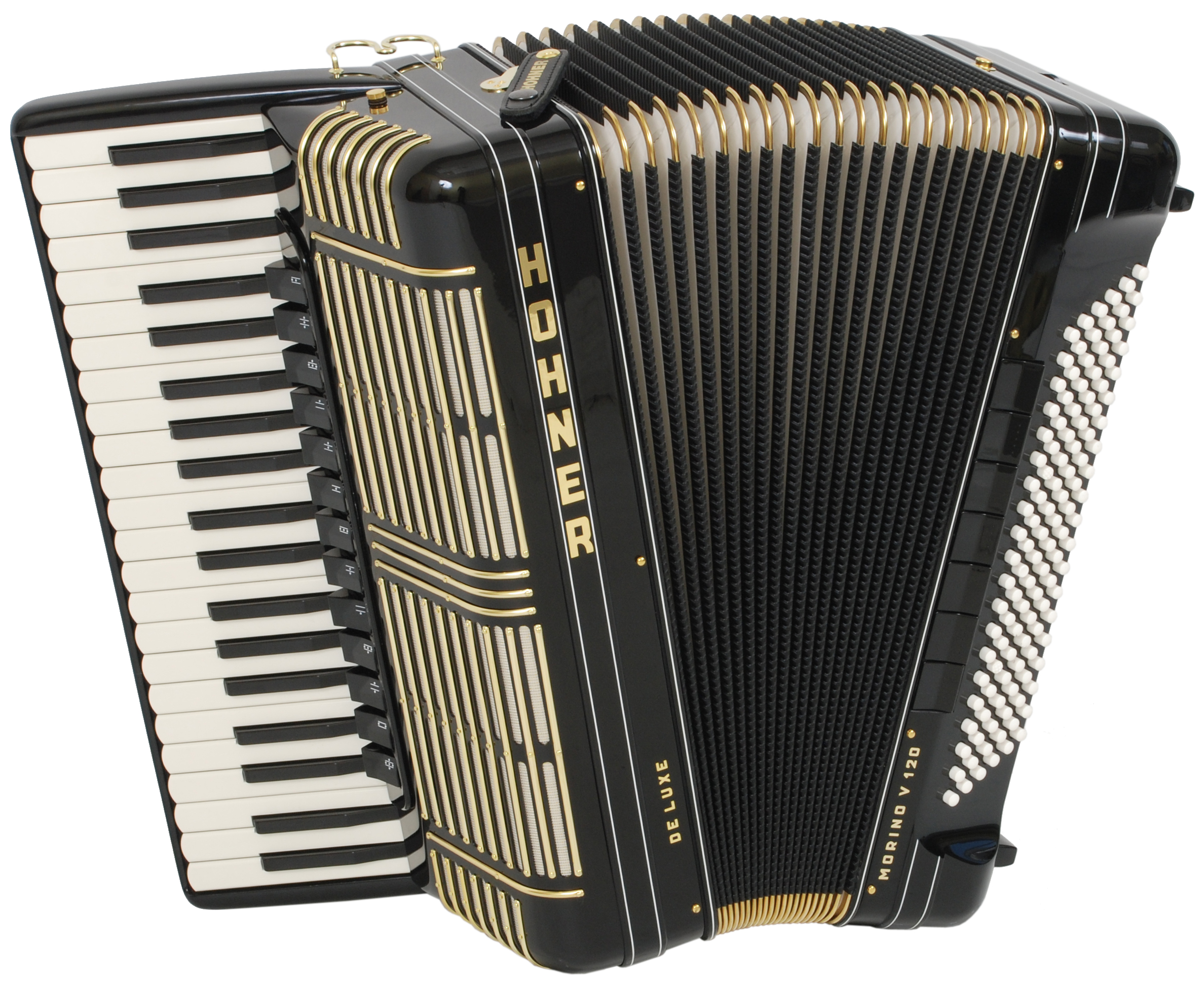
Accordion

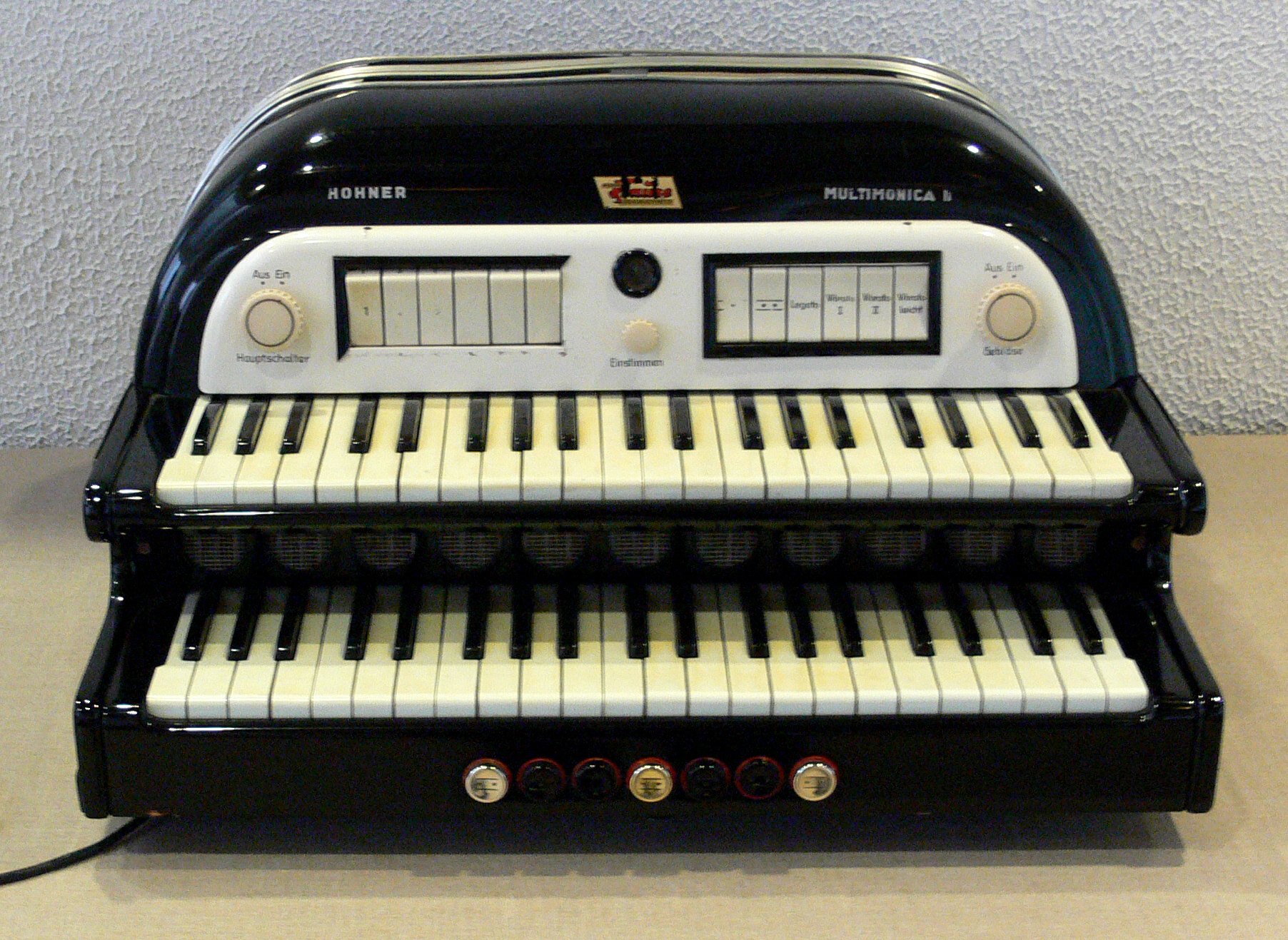
Multimonica

The Hohner Electravox is an electronic accordion made in the late 1960s and early 1970s, which has one channel (combined left hand and right hand) or two channel (separate left hand and right hand channels, which enables independent volume changes), 92 bass/chord buttons, keyboard percussion effect for the bass buttons and keyboard, a vibrato effect (with slow/fast options), and a separate power supply unit, which sits on the floor. The Electravox had 16', 8', 5 1/3', and 4' registers. The tuning for the Electravox could be changed to match another instrument, such as a piano or organ, but this required changing all 12 master tone generators with a special tool.

== Notable Hohner players ==
A number of early blues harmonica players throughout the 20th century have been known for using Hohner Marine Band harmonicas because they were the most available at the time. However, as other harmonica companies began to expand and Hohner produced different types of harmonicas, harmonica players started to develop preferences.

- Carlos del Junco – The blues harmonica player is noted for playing a Golden Melody like his mentor Howard Levy.
- Howard Levy – The multigenre harmonica player is noted for playing several different brands but says the Golden Melody is his favorite.
- Jerry Portnoy – The blues harmonica player is primarily a Hohner Marine Band Crossover player since it came out and has given it much praise. He has played with artists such as Bonnie Raitt, Eric Clapton, Muddy Waters, as well as others.
- John Popper – The lead singer of the jam band Blues Traveler is noted for playing a Special 20.
- Brandon Santini – The blues, roots-rock harmonica player and vocalist is endorsed by Hohner and plays Hohner Special 20 and Hohner Rocket harmonicas.
- John Sebastian, Sr. – The late classical harmonica virtuoso was noted for playing a 64 Chromonica. He also worked on improvements to its lower register as a consultant for Hohner.
- John Sebastian – The folk, rock and blues harmonica player has primarily played both Hohner Meisterklasse and Marine Band harmonicas, sometimes with customizations.
- Neil Young – The rock, country and folk harmonica player is known to play a Hohner Marine Band in the key of G.
- Bobby Darin – The multi-faceted artist released the Blues album "Commitment" in 1969. Several of the album's songs (including "Me and Mr. Hohner") rely heavily on his use of harmonicas.
