= Jack DeJohnette discography =

The discography of Jack DeJohnette contains the official record releases by the American jazz drummer, pianist, composer, and bandleader Jack DeJohnette. His career spans over five decades and encompasses styles including hard bop, jazz fusion, avant-garde, and world music.

== As leader/co-leader ==
| Recording date | Album | Line-up | Label | Year released |
|---|---|---|---|---|
| 1968–12 | The DeJohnette Complex | sextet with Bennie Maupin, Stanley Cowell, Miroslav Vitous, Eddie Gómez, and Roy Haynes | Milestone | 1969 |
| 1970–04 | Have You Heard? | quartet with Bennie Maupin, Gary Peacock and pianist Hideo Ichikawa | Milestone | 1970 |
| 1971–05 | Ruta and Daitya | duo with Keith Jarrett | ECM | 1973 |
| 1972? | Compost - Take Off Your Body | Compost with Bob Moses, Harold Vick, Jack Gregg and Jumma Santos | Columbia | 1972 |
| 1973? | Life Is Round | Compost (as 1971 plus Roland Prince and Ed Finney on guitar, Jeanne Lee, vocals) | CBS | 1973 |
| 1973–06 | Time & Space | duo with Dave Holland (as "special guest"), JDJ on keyboards, vibes and percussion | Trio (Jp) | 1973 |
| 1973–08 | Jackeyboard | trio with JDJ on piano and melodica, Mitsuaki Furuno and George Ohtsuka, live recording | Trio (Jp) | 1973 |
| 1974–03, 1974–05 | Sorcery | quintet with Bennie Maupin, John Abercrombie, Mick Goodrick, Dave Holland and Michael Fellerman (on idiophone and trombone) | Prestige | 1974 |
| 1975–03 | Gateway | Gateway with John Abercrombie and Dave Holland | ECM | 1976 |
| 1975–04 | Cosmic Chicken | Directions with Alex Foster, John Abercrombie and Peter Warren (on electric bass) | Prestige | 1975 |
| 1976–02 | Untitled | Directions, as 1975 with Mike Richmond replacing Warren, and Warren Bernhardt | ECM | 1976 |
| 1976–02 | Pictures | duo with John Abercrombie | ECM | 1977 |
| 1976–05 | New Rags | Directions, as 1975 with Mike Richmond replacing Warren | ECM | 1977 |
| 1977–07 | Gateway 2 | Gateway | ECM | 1978 |
| 1978–06 | New Directions | New Directions with John Abercrombie, Lester Bowie and Eddie Gómez | ECM | 1978 |
| 1978–06 | Terje Rypdal / Miroslav Vitous / Jack DeJohnette | trio with Terje Rypdal and Miroslav Vitous | ECM | 1978 |
| 1979–03 | Special Edition | Special Edition with Arthur Blythe, David Murray and Peter Warren | ECM | 1980 |
| 1979–06 | In Europe (Jack DeJohnette album) | New Directions, live recording | ECM | 1980 |
| 1980–05 | Famous Ballroom – Baltimore '80 | Special Edition with Chico Freeman, Arthur Blythe and Peter Warren | WHP (Italy) | 1980 |
| 1980–09 | Tin Can Alley | Special Edition with Chico Freeman, John Purcell and Peter Warren | ECM | 1981 |
| 1982–09 | Inflation Blues | Special Edition, with Rufus Reid replacing Warren, plus Baikida Carroll as guest on most tracks | ECM | 1983 |
| 1984–06 | Album Album | Special Edition with David Murray, John Purcell, Howard Johnson and Rufus Reid | ECM | 1984 |
| 1985–01 | The Jack DeJohnette Piano Album | trio with JDJ on piano, Eddie Gómez and Freddie Waits | Landmark | 1985 |
| 1985–05 | Zebra | solos on synthesizer and duets with Lester Bowie | MCA | 1989 |
| 1986–09 | In Our Style | duo with David Murray (with Fred Hopkins on two tracks) | DIW (Jp) | 1986 |
| 1987–01 | Irresistible Forces | Special Edition with Greg Osby, Gary Thomas, Mick Goodrick, Lonnie Plaxico and Naná Vasconcelos | Impulse!/MCA | 1987 |
| 1988–02 | Audio-Visualscapes | Special Edition, as 1987 without Vasconcelos | Impulse!/MCA | 1988 |
| 1990 | Parallel Realities | trio with Pat Metheny and Herbie Hancock | MCA | 1990 |
| 1991–06 | Earthwalk | Special Edition, as 1988 with Michael Cain instead of Goodrick | Blue Note | 1991 |
| 1992–02 | Music for the Fifth World | with Vernon Reid, John Scofield, Michael Cain, percussion and vocals | Manhattan | 1993 |
| 1994 | Extra Special Edition | Special Edition as 1991 with Marvin Sewell and Paul Grassi, plus Bobby McFerrin as guest | Blue Note | 1994 |
| 1994–12 | Homecoming | Gateway | ECM | 1995 |
| 1994–12 | In the Moment | Gateway | ECM | 1996 |
| 1995–05 | Dancing with Nature Spirits | trio with Michael Cain and Steve Gorn | ECM | 1996 |
| 1997–01 | Oneness | quartet with Michael Cain, Jerome Harris and Don Alias | ECM | 1997 |
| 1999–11 | Invisible Nature | duo with John Surman | ECM | 2002 |
| 2001–10 | The Elephant Sleeps But Still Remembers | duo with Bill Frisell, live recording | Golden Beams | 2006 |
| 2002–01 | Music from the Hearts of the Masters | duo with Foday Musa Suso | Golden Beams | 2005 |
| 2003–08 | Music in the Key of Om | solo, nominated for a 2006 Grammy as "Best New Age Album" | Golden Beams | 2005 |
| 2004–11 | Saudades | Trio Beyond with John Scofield and Larry Goldings | ECM | 2006 |
| 2005–10 | Hybrids | As the Ripple Effect with John Surman, Ben Surman, Foday Musa Suso | Golden Beams | 2005 |
| 2006–10 | Peace Time | solo, Grammy 2009 as "Best New Age Album" | Golden Beams | 2007 |
| 2008–02 | Music We Are | trio with Danilo Perez and John Patitucci | Golden Beams | 2009 |
| 2011? | Sounds of New York | As The Super Premium Band with Kenny Barron and Ron Carter | Happinet (JP) | 2011 |
| 2011 | Sound Travels | solo, duo to quintet, with Esperanza Spalding, Tim Ries, Ambrose Akinmusire, Lionel Loueke a.o. | Golden Beams/eOne | 2012 |
| 2013–08 | Made in Chicago | quintet with Muhal Richard Abrams, Larry Gray, Roscoe Mitchell and Henry Threadgill, live recording | ECM | 2015 |
| 2015–10 | In Movement | trio with Ravi Coltrane and Matthew Garrison | ECM | 2016 |
| 2015? | Return | solo piano (vinyl LP only) | Newvelle (F) | 2016 |
| 2017–01 | Hudson | quartet with John Medeski, John Scofield and Larry Grenadier | Motéma | 2017 |

== As sideman ==
The table lists approximately all of the recordings Jack DeJohnette was part of, for the most part as drummer. The default of the sortable table is the "Date" that signifies the year and month (if possible) of the recording session(s). Names of musicians, bands and labels are only linked by first appearance.

| Recording date | Album | Leader | Line-up | Label | Year released |
|---|---|---|---|---|---|
| 1965–09, 1966–04 | Jacknife | Jackie McLean | quintet with Charles Tolliver or Lee Morgan, Larry Willis and Larry Ridley, quartet with Willis and Don Moore | Blue Note | 1975 |
| 1966–03 | Dream Weaver | Charles Lloyd Quartet | quartet with Keith Jarrett and Cecil McBee | Atlantic | 1966 |
| 1966–07, 1966–10 | The Flowering | Charles Lloyd Quartet | quartet as 1966.03 | Atlantic | 1971 |
| 1966–09 | Forest Flower | Charles Lloyd Quartet | quartet as 1966.03 | Atlantic | 1967 |
| 1966.10 | Charles Lloyd in Europe | Charles Lloyd Quartet | quartet as 1966.03 | Atlantic | 1968 |
| 1966–10 or later | Blow-Up | Herbie Hancock | with Freddie Hubbard, Joe Henderson, Ron Carter a.o. | MGM | 1967 |
| 1967–01 | Love-In | Charles Lloyd Quartet | quartet as 1966.03, Ron McClure replacing McBee | Atlantic | 1967 |
| 1967–01 | Journey Within | Charles Lloyd Quartet | quartet as 1967.01 | Atlantic | 1967 |
| 1967–05 | Charles Lloyd in the Soviet Union | Charles Lloyd Quartet | quartet as 1967.01 | Atlantic | 1970 |
| 1967–09, 1968–05 | Tetragon | Joe Henderson | quartet with Don Friedman and Ron Carter on four of seven tracks | Milestone | 1968 |
| 1967–12 | Demon's Dance | Jackie McLean | quintet with Woody Shaw | Blue Note | 1970 |
| 1968–05 | Spectrum | Cedar Walton | quintet with Blue Mitchell, Clifford Jordan and Richard Davis | Prestige | 1968 |
| 1968–06 | Bill Evans at the Montreux Jazz Festival | Bill Evans | trio with Eddie Gómez, live recording; JDJ's sole album with Evans | Verve | 1968 |
| 1968–08 | Sky Shadows | Eric Kloss | quintet with Jaki Byard, Pat Martino and Bob Cranshaw | Prestige | 1968 |
| 1968–11 | Soundtrack | Charles Lloyd | quartet as 1967.01 | Atlantic | 1969 |
| 1968–11 | Do You Know the Way? | Bobby Timmons | trio with Bob Cranshaw plus Joe Beck on half the tracks | Milestone | 1968 |
| 1969–02 | The Song Is You | Stan Getz | quartet with Stanley Cowell and Miroslav Vitouš | Laserlight | 1996 |
| 1969–03 | Peacemeal | Lee Konitz | quintet with Marshall Brown, Dick Katz and Eddie Gómez | Milestone | 1970 |
| 1969–05 | Is | Chick Corea | septet with Woody Shaw, Bennie Maupin, Hubert Laws, Dave Holland and second drummer Horace Arnold | Solid State | 1969 |
| 1969–05 | Sundance | Chick Corea | septet, same sessions as Is | Groove Merchant | 1972 |
| 1969–05 | Power to the People | Joe Henderson | quartet with Herbie Hancock, Ron Carter plus trumpeter Mike Lawrence on two tracks | Milestone | 1969 |
| 1969–07 | Miles Davis at Newport 1955-1975: The Bootleg Series Vol. 4 | Miles Davis | quartet with Chick Corea and Dave Holland (three tracks), live recording; compilation | Columbia/Legacy | 2015 |
| 1969–07 | To Hear Is to See! | Eric Kloss | quartet with Chick Corea and Dave Holland | Prestige | 1970 |
| 1969–07, 1969–11 | Live in Europe 1969: The Bootleg Series Vol. 2 | Miles Davis | quintet with Wayne Shorter, Chick Corea and Dave Holland, live recording; compilation | Columbia/Legacy | 2013 |
| 1969–08, 1970–01 | Bitches Brew | Miles Davis | large ensemble with Wayne Shorter, Bennie Maupin, Joe Zawinul, Chick Corea, John McLaughlin, Dave Holland, Lenny White a.o.; JDJ on all tracks | Columbia | 1970 |
| 1969–08, 1970–01 | Double Image // Rare Miles From The Complete Bitches Brew Sessions | Miles Davis | large ensemble with Wayne Shorter, Bennie Maupin, Joe Zawinul, Chick Corea, John McLaughlin, Dave Holland, Ron Carter, Billy Cobham, Jack DeJohnette, Herbie Hancock, Steve Grossman, Airto Moreira, Harvey Brooks, Larry Young Lenny White a.o.; JDJ on all tracks | Columbia/Legacy | 2020 |
| 1969–08, 1970–01 | The Complete Bitches Brew Sessions | Miles Davis | large ensemble with Wayne Shorter, Bennie Maupin, Joe Zawinul, Chick Corea, Don Alias, Khalil Balakrishna, Bihari Sharma, Juma SantosJohn McLaughlin, Dave Holland, Ron Carter, Billy Cobham, Jack DeJohnette, Herbie Hancock, Steve Grossman, Airto Moreira, Harvey Brooks, Larry Young Lenny White a.o.; JDJ on all tracks | Columbia/Legacy | 1998 |
| 1969–08, 1969–09 | Super Nova | Wayne Shorter | septet with Sonny Sharrock, John McLaughlin, Miroslav Vitouš, Airto Moreira, Chick Corea as second drummer | Blue Note | 1969 |
| 1969–10 | Infinite Search | Miroslav Vitouš | quintet with Joe Henderson, John McLaughlin and Herbie Hancock | Embryo, Atlantic | 1970 |
| 1970–01 | Circle in the Round | Miles Davis | large ensemble on the one track with JDJ as on Bitches Brew and Big Fun; compilation | Columbia | 1979 |
| 1970–01 | Consciousness! | Eric Kloss | quintet with Chick Corea, Pat Martino and Dave Holland | Prestige | 1970 |
| 1970–02 | Jack Johnson | Miles Davis | septet with Bennie Maupin, John McLaughlin, Sonny Sharrock, Chick Corea and Dave Holland, on ten of the over fifty minutes total, but uncredited on the original LP | Columbia | 1971 |
| 1968–11, 1970–02 | Directions, later on The Complete In a Silent Way Sessions resp. The Complete Jack Johnson Sessions | Miles Davis | octet with Wayne Shorter, Herbie Hancock, Chick Corea, Joe Zawinul and Dave Holland; 1970 date: quintet with Steve Grossman, John McLaughlin and Holland; compilation | Columbia, Columbia/Legacy | 1981 |
| 1969–11, 1970–01, 1970–02, 1970-03 | Big Fun | Miles Davis | large ensembles with Wayne Shorter, Steve Grossman, Bennie Maupin, Joe Zawinul, Chick Corea, John McLaughlin, Dave Holland, Billy Cobham a.o.; quintet with Grossman, McLaughlin and Holland; JDJ on half the tracks; compilation | Columbia | 1974 |
| 1970–03 | Live at the Fillmore East, March 7, 1970 | Miles Davis | sextet with Wayne Shorter, Chick Corea, Dave Holland and Airto Moreira, live recording | Columbia/Legacy | 2001 |
| 1970–04 | Black Beauty: Live at the Fillmore West | Miles Davis | sextet with Steve Grossman, Chick Corea, Dave Holland and Airto Moreira, live recording | CBS/Sony (Jp) | 1973 |
| 1970–06 | Miles Davis at Fillmore, Miles Davis 1970: The Bootleg Series Vol. 3 | Miles Davis | septet with Steve Grossman, Chick Corea, Keith Jarrett, Dave Holland and Airto Moreira, live recording, 2014 compilation includes the 1970.04 date | Columbia, Columbia/Legacy | 1970 |
| 1970–07 | Joe Farrell Quartet | Joe Farrell Quartet | quartet with Chick Corea and Dave Holland plus John McLaughlin on two tracks | CTI | 1970 |
| 1970–07 | Round Trip | Sadao Watanabe | quartet with Chick Corea and Miroslav Vitouš | CBS/Sony (Jp) | 1970 |
| 1970–09 | The Sun | Chick Corea | quintet with Steve Grossman, Dave Holland and multi-instrumentalist Steve Jackson | Express (Jp) | 1971 |
| 1970–11 | Straight Life | Freddie Hubbard | octet with Joe Henderson, Herbie Hancock, George Benson, Ron Carter, Weldon Irvine and Richard Landrum | CTI | 1971 |
| 1970–02, 1970–06, 1970–12 | Live-Evil | Miles Davis | septet with Gary Bartz, John McLaughlin, Keith Jarrett, Michael Henderson and Airto Moreira, live recording | Columbia | 1971 |
| 1971–02 | Beyond the Blue Horizon | George Benson | sextet with Clarence Palmer, Ron Carter and percussion | CTI | 1971 |
| 1971–06 | The Rite of Spring | Hubert Laws | octet with Bob James, Ron Carter, Airto Moreira a.o., arranged by Don Sebesky | CTI | 1971 |
| 1970–08, 1970–10 | Zawinul | Joe Zawinul | tentet with Woody Shaw, Wayne Shorter, Hubert Laws, Herbie Hancock a.o.; JDJ on two tracks, melodica resp. percussion | Atlantic | 1971 |
| 1971–09 | First Light | Freddie Hubbard | septet with Herbie Hancock, George Benson, Ron Carter, Airto Moreira a.o. plus horn section and strings arranged by Don Sebesky | CTI | 1971 |
| 1971–09 | Polar AC | Freddie Hubbard | sextet with Junior Cook, Hubert Laws, George Benson and Ron Carter on the one track with JDJ | CTI | 1975 |
| 1972–03 or 1972–04 | Black Is the Color | Joe Henderson | quintet to octet with George Cables, Dave Holland a.o.; JDJ also on electric piano | Milestone | 1972 |
| 1972–06, 1972–07 | On the Corner | Miles Davis | large ensemble with alternating constellations | Columbia | 1972 |
| 1972–07 | Next Album | Sonny Rollins | quintet with George Cables, Bob Cranshaw and Arthur Jenkins; JDJ on two of five tracks | Milestone | 1972 |
| 1972–11 | Moon Germs | Joe Farrell | quartet with Herbie Hancock and Stanley Clarke | CTI | 1973 |
| 1972–12 | Mizrab | Gábor Szabó | quintet with Bob James, Ron Carter and Ralph MacDonald plus horn and string section | CTI | 1973 |
| 1973–03 | In Concert Volume One | Freddie Hubbard & Stanley Turrentine | sextet with Herbie Hancock, Eric Gale and Ron Carter, live recording | CTI | 1973 |
| 1973–03 | In Concert Volume Two | Freddie Hubbard & Stanley Turrentine | sextet, same concerts | CTI | 1973 |
| 1973–01, 1973–02, 1973–04 | Multiple | Joe Henderson | quintet with Larry Willis, Dave Holland and Arthur Jenkins plus James Ulmer on one track | Milestone | 1973 |
| 1973–04, 1973–05 | Giant Box | Don Sebesky | big band with most of the CTI musicians plus strings | CTI | 1973 |
| 1973–06 | First Visit | Dave Liebman | quartet with Richie Beirach and Dave Holland | Philips | 1973 |
| 1973–07 | Body Talk | George Benson | big band with Harold Mabern, Ron Carter a.o. arranged and condaucted by Pee Wee Ellis | CTI | 1973 |
| 1973–10, 1973–11 | Higher Ground | Johnny Hammond | big band with JDJ on one track | Kudu | 1974 |
| 1973–11, 1973–12 | Skylark | Paul Desmond | octet with Bob James, Gábor Szabó, Ron Carter a.o. arranged by Don Sebesky | CTI | 1974 |
| 1974? | Illuminations | Alice Coltrane and Carlos Santana | septet and tentet on the two tracks with JDJ and Dave Holland, plus strings | Columbia | 1974 |
| 1974–06 | Timeless | John Abercrombie | trio with Jan Hammer | ECM | 1975 |
| 1974–07, 1974–10, 1974–11 | She Was Too Good to Me | Chet Baker | octet with Hubert Laws, Bob James, Ron Carter a.o., arranged by Don Sebesky; JDJ on three of eight tracks | CTI | 1974 |
| 1974–09 | Satori | Lee Konitz | quartet with Martial Solal and Dave Holland plus Dick Katz on one track | Milestone | 1975 |
| 1974–11 | Trance | Steve Kuhn | quartet with Steve Swallow and Sue Evans | ECM | 1975 |
| 1975–06 | Gnu High | Kenny Wheeler | quartet with Keith Jarrett and Dave Holland | ECM | 1976 |
| 1975–07 | Have You Ever Seen the Rain | Stanley Turrentine | tentet with Freddie Hubbard, Patrice Rushen, Ron Carter a.o. plus vocals arranged and cond. by Gene Page | Fantasy | 1975 |
| 1975–06, 1975–10 | Lovers | Cannonball Adderley | tentet with Nat Adderley Sr. & Jr., Alvin Batiste, George Duke, Alphonso Johnson, Ron Carter, Airto Moreira and Flora Purim | Fantasy | 1976 |
| 1975–07 – 1976–01 | The Hapless Child (and Other Inscrutable Stories) | Michael Mantler | quartet with Carla Bley, Terje Rypdal and Steve Swallow plus vocals by Robert Wyatt a.o. | ECM/WATT | 1976 |
| 1976–03 | Cloud Dance | Collin Walcott | quartet with John Abercrombie and Dave Holland | ECM | 1976 |
| 1976 | Magical Shepard | Miroslav Vitouš | quartet with Herbie Hancock and Airto Moreira (plus vocals) on the two tracks with JDJ | Warner | 1976 |
| 1977–02 | Tales of Another | Gary Peacock | trio with Keith Jarrett | ECM | 1977 |
| 1977–04 | Supertrios | McCoy Tyner | trio with Ron Carter on half of the twelve tracks | Milestone | 1977 |
| 1977–07 | Deer Wan | Kenny Wheeler | quintet with Jan Garbarek, John Abercrombie and Dave Holland | ECM | 1978 |
| 1977–02, 1977–10 | Merge | Jack Wilkins Quartet | quartet with Randy Brecker and Eddie Gómez | Chiaroscuro | 1977 |
| 1977–12 | Of Mist and Melting | Bill Connors | quartet with Jan Garbarek and Gary Peacock | ECM | 1978 |
| 1977–12 | Places | Jan Garbarek | quartet with John Taylor and Bill Connors | ECM | 1978 |
| 1977–12 | The Boyé Multi-National Crusade for Harmony /Disc 7 | Julius Hemphill | seven-disc box set | New World | 2021 |
| 1978–01 | Batik | Ralph Towner | trio with Eddie Gómez | ECM | 1978 |
| 1978–01, 1978–-02 | Electric Guitarist | John McLaughlin | quartet with Chick Corea and Stanley Clarke on the one track with JDJ | Columbia | 1978 |
| 1978–03, 1978–04 | Super Blue | Freddie Hubbard | sextet with Hubert Laws, Joe Henderson, Kenny Barron and Ron Carter | Columbia | 1978 |
| 1978–06 | A Song for You | Ron Carter | quartet with Kenny Barron and Ralph MacDonald plus cello section and Jay Berliner on half of the tracks | Milestone | 1978 |
| 1978 | The Outside Within | Chico Freeman | quartet with John Hicks and Cecil McBee | India Navigation | 1981 |
| 1978–08, 1978–09 | Together | McCoy Tyner | octet with Freddie Hubbard, Hubert Laws, Benny Maupin, Bobby Hutcherson, Stanley Clarke and Bill Summers | Milestone | 1979 |
| 1978–11 | In Pas(s)ing | Mick Goodrick | quartet with John Surman and Eddie Gómez | ECM | 1979 |
| 1979–05 | Sound Suggestions | George Adams | sextet with Kenny Wheeler, Heinz Sauer, Richard Beirach and Dave Holland | ECM | 1979 |
| 1979–05 | Elm | Richard Beirach | trio with George Mraz | ECM | 1979 |
| 1979 | Keyed In | Joanne Brackeen | trio with Eddie Gómez | Tappan Zee | 1979 |
| 1979 | Ancient Dynasty | Joanne Brackeen | quartet with Joe Henderson and Eddie Gómez | Tappan Zee | 1980 |
| 1980–02, 1980–03 | Rain Forest | Jeremy Steig and Eddie Gómez | quartet and sextet with Mike Nock and Eddie Gómez, plus percussion, on the two tracks with JDJ | CMP | 1980 |
| 1980–05 | Super Strings | Ron Carter | quartet with Chet Baker and Kenny Barron on the three (of five) tracks with JDJ | Milestone | 1981 |
| 1980–05 | Patrão | Ron Carter | quartet, same date as Super Strings | Milestone | 1981 |
| 1980–05 | 80/81 | Pat Metheny | quintet with Michael Brecker, Dewey Redman and Charlie Haden | ECM | 1980 |
| 1980–10 | 13th House | McCoy Tyner | big band with Slide Hampton, Bob Stewart, Hubert Laws, Frank Foster, Ron Carter a.o. | Milestone | 1981 |
| 1981–01 | To Be Continued | Terje Rypdal | trio with Mirolav Vitouš | ECM | 1981 |
| 1981–01 | The Amazing Adventures of Simon Simon | John Surman | duo | ECM | 1981 |
| 1981–04 | Freeman & Freeman | Chico Freeman / Von Freeman | quintet with Kenny Barron or Muhal Richard Abrams and Cecil McBee, live recording | India Navigation | 1989 |
| 1981–05 | Solidarity | Peter Warren | quintet with Ray Anderson, John Purcell and John Scofield | JAPO | 1982 |
| 1981–08 | Voice from the Past – Paradigm | Gary Peacock | quartet with Jan Garbarek and Tomasz Stanko | ECM | 1982 |
| 1981–12 | Special Identity | Joanne Brackeen | trio with Eddie Gómez | Antilles | 1982 |
| 1982? | Tradition in Transition | Chico Freeman | quartet and quintet with Wallace Roney and Cecil McBee; JDJ on four tracks, replacing pianist Clyde Criner on one | Elektra/Musician | 1982 |
| 1982–08 | Reel Life | Sonny Rollins | quintet with Bobby Broom, Yoshiaki Masuo and Bob Cranshaw | Milestone | 1982 |
| 1983-01 | Standards, Vol. 1 | Keith Jarrett | with Gary Peacock & Jack DeJohnette | ECM | 1983 |
| 1983-01 | Changes | Keith Jarrett | with Gary Peacock, Jack DeJohnette | ECM | 1984 |
| 1983-01 | Standards, Vol. 2 | Keith Jarrett | with Gary Peacock, Jack DeJohnette | ECM | 1985 |
| 1983–05 | Double, Double You | Kenny Wheeler | quintet with Michael Brecker, John Taylor and Dave Holland | ECM | 1984 |
| 1983–10 | Picture in Three Colours | Eero Koivistoinen | sextet with Tom Harrell, John Scofield, Jim McNeely and Ron McClure | Pro | 1984 |
| 1983–12 | This Is for You, John | Benny Golson | quintet with Pharoah Sanders, Cedar Walton and Ron Carter | Baystate | 1984 |
| 1983–12 | The All American Trio | Cedar Walton | trio with Ron Carter | Baystate | 1984 |
| 1984–04 | Togethering | Kenny Burrell and Grover Washington Jr. | quartet with Ron Carter plus Ralph MacDonald on two tracks | Blue Note | 1985 |
| 1984–04 | Night | John Abercrombie | quartet with Michael Brecker and Jan Hammer | ECM | 1984 |
| 1985-07 | Standards Live | Keith Jarrett | with Gary Peacock, Jack DeJohnette | ECM | 1986 |
| 1985? | Twilight Time | Bennie Wallace | sextet with Ray Anderson, Dr. John, John Scofield, Eddie Gómez on the three tracks with JDJ | Blue Note | 1985 |
| 1985–12 | Song X | Pat Metheny | quintet with Ornette Coleman, Charlie Haden and Denardo Coleman as second drummer | Geffen | 1986 |
| 1986-07 | Still Live | Keith Jarrett | with Gary Peacock, Jack DeJohnette | ECM | |
| 1987–02, 1987–03 | The Village | Henry Butler | sextet with John Purcell, Alvin Batiste, Bob Stewart and Ron Carter | Impulse!/MCA | 1987 |
| 1987–03 | Cross Currents | Eliane Elias | quartet with Barry Finnerty and Eddie Gómez | Denon/Blue Note | 1987 |
| 1987? | Michael Brecker | Michael Brecker | quintet with Pat Metheny, Kenny Kirkland and Charlie Haden | Impulse!/MCA | 1987 |
| 1987–07 | Tribute to John Coltrane: Live Under the Sky | Wayne Shorter, David Liebman, Richie Beirach, Eddie Gómez and JDJ | quintet, live recording | Paddle Wheel | 1987 |
| 1988–03 | Triplicate | Dave Holland Trio | trio with Steve Coleman | ECM | 1988 |
| 1988–05 | Trio + One | Dave Liebman | trio with Dave Holland plus oboist Caris Visentin | OWL | 1988 |
| 1988? | Don't Try This at Home | Michael Brecker | quartet to septet with Mike Stern, Don Grolnick, Herbie Hancock, Charlie Haden a.o. on the four (of eight) tracks on CD with JDJ | Impulse! | 1988 |
| 1988–09 | Step by Step | Tommy Smith | quintet with Mitchel Forman, John Scofield and Eddie Gómez | Blue Note | 1989 |
| 1989–08, 1989–09 | Falling in Love with Jazz | Sonny Rollins | sextet with Clifton Anderson, Mark Soskin, Jerome Harris, Bob Cranshaw and JDJ on most tracks | Milestone | 1989 |
| 1989-10 | Standards in Norway | Keith Jarrett | with Gary Peacock, Jack DeJohnette | ECM | 1995 |
| 1989-10 | Tribute | Keith Jarrett | with Gary Peacock, Jack DeJohnette | ECM | 1990 |
| 1989–11 | Time on My Hands | John Scofield | quartet with Joe Lovano and Charlie Haden | Blue Note | 1990 |
| 1989–12 | Eliane Elias Plays Jobim | Eliane Elias | quartet with Eddie Gómez and Nana Vasconcelos | Blue Note | 1990 |
| 1989–12 | Straight Street | Harold Mabern Trio | trio with Ron Carter | DIW | 1991 |
| 1990-04 | The Cure | Keith Jarrett | with Gary Peacock, Jack DeJohnette | ECM | 1991 |
| 1991–08 | Here's to the People | Sonny Rollins | sextet with Clifton Anderson, Mark Soskin, Jerome Harris and Bob Cranshaw, JDJ on half of the tracks | Milestone | 1991 |
| 1991–09 | Where Legends Dwell | Joanne Brackeen | trio with Eddie Gómez | Ken Music | 1992 |
| 1991–09 | Altered Things | Eero Koivistoinen | septet with Randy Brecker, Conrad Herwig, John Scofield, David Kikoski and Ron McClure, plus Bugge Wesseltoft on some tracks | Timeless | 1992 |
| 1991-10 | Bye Bye Blackbird | Keith Jarrett | with Gary Peacock, Jack DeJohnette | ECM | 1993 |
| 1992–03 | Fantasia | Eliane Elias | trio with Eddie Gómez on the four tracks with JDJ | Blue Note | 1992 |
| 1991–10, 1992–04 | Six Pack | Gary Burton & Friends | septets mostly with Bob Berg, Mulgrew Miller, Larry Goldings, Steve Swallow and alternating guitarist "friends" | GRP | 1992 |
| 1992–06 | Universal Language | Joe Lovano | septet with Tim Hagans, Kenny Werner, Charlie Haden, Steve Swallow and Judi Silvano | Blue Note | 1993 |
| 1992–04, 1992–12 | Fictionary | Lyle Mays | trio with Marc Johnson | Geffen | 1992 |
| 1993–02 | Trust | Richard Beirach Trio | trio with Dave Holland | Evidence | 1996 |
| 1993–02, 1993–03 | Lookin' on the Bright Side | Harold Mabern Trio | trio with Christian McBride | DIW | 1993 |
| 1992–11, 1993–04 | The Leading Man | Harold Mabern | septet with Bill Mobley, Bill Easley, Kevin Eubanks, Ron Carter and vocalist Pamela Baskin-Watson | DIW | 1993 |
| 1993–05 | Exile's Gate | Gary Thomas | quartet with Paul Bollenback and Charles Covington on the three (of seven tracks) with JDJ | JMT | 1993 |
| 1993–07, 1993–08 | Old Flames | Sonny Rollins | quintet with Clifton Anderson, Tommy Flanagan and Bob Cranshaw, plus horn section on three tracks | Milestone | 1993 |
| 1993–10 | Feed the Fire | Betty Carter | quartet with Geri Allen and Dave Holland, live recording | Verve | 1994 |
| 1993–12 | Real Book | Steve Swallow | quintet with Tom Harrell, Joe Lovano and Mulgrew Miller | Xtra Watt | 1994 |
| 1994 | Keith Jarrett at the Blue Note | Keith Jarrett | with Gary Peacock, Jack DeJohnette | ECM | 1995 |
| 1994? | Reaching Up | Ernie Watts | quartet with Mulgrew Miller and Charles Fambrough, plus Arturo Sandoval on two tracks | JVC | 1994 |
| 1994–09, 1994–11 | Double Rainbow: The Music of Antonio Carlos Jobim | Joe Henderson | quartet with Herbie Hancock and Christian McBride on the four of eleven tracks with JDJ | Verve | 1995 |
| 1994–12 | Unity | Ernie Watts | quartet with Geri Allen, Eddie Gómez and Steve Swallow | JVC | 1995 |
| 1995 | The New Standard | Herbie Hancock | sextet with Michael Brecker, John Scofield, Dave Holland and Don Alias | Verve | 1996 |
| 1995 | Music from Man of La Mancha | Eliane Elias | trio with Eddie Gómez on the five tracks with JDJ | Concord Jazz | 2018 |
| 1995–08, 1995–10 | Sonny Rollins + 3 | Sonny Rollins | quartet with Stephen Scott and Bob Cranshaw | Milestone | 1996 |
| 1996 | Tales from the Hudson | Michael Brecker | quintet with Pat Metheny, Joey Calderazzo and Dave Holland, sextet on two tracks with McCoy Tyner and Don Alias | Impulse! | 1996 |
| 1996-03 | Tokyo '96 | Keith Jarrett | with Gary Peacock, Jack DeJohnette | ECM | 1998 |
| 1996–09 | Got My Mental | Steve Khan | sextet with John Patitucci, Don Alias, Café, Bobby Allende and Marc Quiñones | Evidence | 1997 |
| 1997 | Give and Take | Mike Stern | trio with John Patitucci, plus Michael Brecker, David Sanborn, Gil Goldstein and Don Alias on different tracks | Atlantic | 1997 |
| 1997–03 | As We Are Now | Renee Rosnes | quartet with Chris Potter and Christian McBride | Blue Note | 1997 |
| 1997–05 | Unspoken | Chris Potter | quartet with John Scofield and Dave Holland | Concord Jazz | 1997 |
| 1997–06 | A Delicate Balance | Kenny Werner Trio | trio with Dave Holland | BMG (F)/RCA Victor | 1997 |
| 1998–03 | Selim Sivad: A Tribute to Miles Davis | World Saxophone Quartet | WSQ are John Purcell, Oliver Lake, David Murray and Hamiet Bluiett, plus percussion; JDJ also on piano | Justin Time | 1998 |
| 1998-11 | After the Fall | Keith Jarrett | with Gary Peacock, Jack DeJohnette | ECM | 2018 |
| 1999-07 | Whisper Not | Keith Jarrett | with Gary Peacock, Jack DeJohnette | ECM | 2000 |
| 1999–08 | Anthem | D. D. Jackson | quintet with Christian Howes, Richard Bona and Mino Cinelu, plus James Carter on some tracks | RCA Victor | 2000 |
| 1999–05, 1999–06 | Everything I Love | Eliane Elias | quartet with Rodney Jones and Marc Johnson | Blue Note | 2000 |
| 2000–01 | Golden Quartet | Wadada Leo Smith | quartet with Anthony Davis and Malachi Favors | Tzadik | 2000 |
| 2000? | Thorn | Antonio Faraò | trio with and Drew Gress, plus Chris Potter on four tracks | Enja | 2000 |
| 2000–05, 2000–07 | This Is What I Do | Sonny Rollins | quintet with Clifton Anderson, Stephen Scott and Bob Cranshaw | Milestone | 2000 |
| 2000-07 | Inside Out | Keith Jarrett | with Gary Peacock, Jack DeJohnette | ECM | 2001 |
| 2000–12 | Reunion | Jack Wilkins | quintet with Randy Brecker, Michael Brecker and Eddie Gómez | Chiaroscuro | 2001 |
| 2000–12 | Nearness of You: The Ballad Book | Michael Brecker | quintet with Pat Metheny, Herbie Hancock and Charlie Haden | Verve | 2001 |
| 2001-04 | Yesterdays | Keith Jarrett | with Gary Peacock, Jack DeJohnette | ECM | 2009 |
| 2001-04 | Always Let Me Go | Keith Jarrett | with Gary Peacock, Jack DeJohnette | ECM | 2002 |
| 2001–06 | Free and Equal | John Surman | duo plus London Brass, live recording | ECM | 2003 |
| 2001-07 | My Foolish Heart | Keith Jarrett | with Gary Peacock, Jack DeJohnette | ECM | 2007 |
| 2001-07 | The Out-of-Towners | Keith Jarrett | with Gary Peacock, Jack DeJohnette | ECM | 2004 |
| 2002–04 | The Year of the Elephant | Wadada Leo Smith's Golden Quartet | quartet with Anthony Davis and Malachi Favors | Pi | 2002 |
| 2002-07 | Up for It | Keith Jarrett | with Gary Peacock, Jack DeJohnette | ECM | 2003 |
| 2002 | Universal Syncopations | Miroslav Vitouš | quintet with Jan Garbarek, Chick Corea and John McLaughlin, plus brass on three tracks | ECM | 2003 |
| 2003 | 8 Trios for 4 Pianists | Szakcsi Generation | trios with Kálmán Oláh, Szakcsi Lakatos Róbert, Béla Szakcsi Lakatos or his junior and John Patitucci | Budapest Music Center | 2003 |
| 2004–01 | The Life of a Song | Geri Allen | trio with Dave Holland, plus horns on one track | Telarc | 2004 |
| 2004–01, 2004–02 | Always | Kálmán Oláh Trio | trio with Ron McClure | Memphis Int. | 2006 |
| 2004–06 | 'S Wonderful | Hank Jones, The Great Jazz Trio | trio with John Patitucci | Eighty-Eight's | 2004 |
| 2005–06 | Speak Low | Hank Jones, The Great Jazz Trio | trio with John Patitucci | Eighty-Eight's | 2005 |
| 2006–08 | Pilgrimage | Michael Brecker | quintet with Pat Metheny, Herbie Hancock or Brad Mehldau and John Patitucci | Heads Up | 2007 |
| 2006–09 | Guitars | McCoy Tyner | quartet with Ron Carter featuring Bill Frisell, Marc Ribot, John Scofield, Derek Trucks and Béla Fleck | McCoy Tyner Music | 2008 |
| 2007–09 | Brewster's Rooster | John Surman | quartet with John Abercrombie and Drew Gress | ECM | 2009 |
| 2008–10 | America | Wadada Leo Smith | duo | Tzadik | 2009 |
| 2009-07 | Somewhere | Keith Jarrett | with Gary Peacock, Jack DeJohnette | ECM | 2013 |
| 2010–04 | Apex | Rudresh Mahanthappa & Bunky Green | quintet with Jason Moran and François Moutin; JDJ on four of ten tracks | Pi | 2010 |
| 2012–12 | The Endless Mysteries | George Colligan | trio with Larry Grenadier | Origin | 2013 |
| 2012–12 | The Great Lakes Suites | Wadada Leo Smith | quartet with Henry Threadgill and John Lindberg | TUM | 2014 |
| 2013–03 | Evan | Antonio Faraò American Quartet | quartet with Joe Lovano and Ira Coleman | Cristal (F) | 2013 |
| 2016–04 | Fire | Dave Liebman | quartet with Kenny Werner and Dave Holland | Jazzline | 2018 |
| 2017? | Mikrojazz! | Philipp Gerschlauer & David Fiuczynski | quintet with Giorgi Mikadze and Matthew Garrison | RareNoise | 2017 |
| 2017–05 | Blue Maqams | Anouar Brahem | quartet with Django Bates and Dave Holland | ECM | 2017 |
| 2018–10 | Skyline | Gonzalo Rubalcaba | trio with Ron Carter | 5Passion | 2021 |
| 2021? | Every Note Is True | Ethan Iverson | trio with Larry Grenadier | Blue Note | 2021 |
