= Tadayuki Naitoh =

Japanese photographer (born 1941)

Tadayuki Naitoh (内藤 忠行, Naitō Tadayuki; born 30 May 1941) is a Japanese photographer known for his photographs of jazz musicians and of Africa.

Naitoh was born in Asakusa, Tokyo in 1941. He graduated from a photography course at Tōkyō Dezaināzu Gakuin (東京デザイナーズ学院) in 1964. In 1970 he set up his own company, Photohouse OM.

From an early age he became interested in jazz and photography, and he began photographing jazz musicians in performance in his early 20s. In 1970, he published a photo book on the trumpet player Terumasa Hino. He travelled widely in Africa, Asia and America, leading to a number of unusual and arresting images: Zebra, a collection of his photographs of zebras, was published in 1988, and other works have used design themes from zebras, often in collages. More recently he has moved into photographing lotuses.

Outside Japan, Naitoh is perhaps best known for his photographs of Miles Davis, which include those used on the sleeves of the 1976 albums Pangaea and Agharta, and a limited edition CD release of Black Beauty: Live at the Fillmore West. Naitoh has also produced recordings.

Naitoh's works are held in the permanent collections of the Tokyo Metropolitan Museum of Photography and Kawasaki City Museum.

== Exhibits/Shows ==
- "Portrait of New Orleans", Seibu Department Stores, Ikebukuro, 1972.
- Exhibit in Gallery Min, Tokyo, May 18 - June 13, 1991. Catalogue: Tadayuki Naito: Sakura (Tokyo, 1991).
- In 2002-2003, The Japan Foundation and The New York Foundation for the Arts financed Mother/Child, a multi-media performance featuring choreography, video, photography and stage art. Naitō was one of the artists featured.
- From May to July 2007 there was a retrospective of his work in the Canon Open Gallery in Shinagawa, Tokyo.

== Book publications ==
- Hino Terumasa no sekai (日野皓正の世界) / Alone alone alone. Tokyo: Sankei Shinbunsha, 1970. (Japanese title means "The world of Terumasa Hino".)
- Nabesan: Tokyo-Dar es Salaam-New York. Tokyo: Tairyūsha, 1977. (Title is in roman letters.)
- (in Japanese) Afurika no tabi (アフリカの旅, African Journey). Tokyo: Photohouse OM, 1980. Black and white photographs of Africa: landscapes, animals, people. Minimal text.
- Chikyū fūzoku mandara (地球風俗曼陀羅). Kobe: Kobe Shinbun Sōgō Shuppan Sentā, 1981.
- Afurika no uta (アフリカの歌) / The Song of Africa. Tokyo: Shōbunsha, 1982. ISBN 4-7949-7007-2. Photographs, mostly in color, of Africa. Despite the English title, the text is in Japanese only.
- Zebra. Tokyo: Jōhō Sentā, 1988. ISBN 4-7958-0293-9. (Title in roman letters.) Photographs of zebras, zebra motifs, collages of zebra motifs, etc. Text in Japanese and English.
- Sakura-Cosm. Tokyo: Switch Shoseki Shuppanbu, 1990. ISBN 4-594-00566-7. (Title is in roman letters.) Text in Japanese and English.
- Shinkuro baibusu (シンクロ・バイブス) / Synchro Vibes. Tokyo: JICC Shuppankyoku, 1991. ISBN 4-7966-0056-6. Essays on photography.
- Waga kokoro no Afurika (わが心のアフリカ). With Lyall Watson. Tokyo: Chikuma Shobō, 1992.
- Uchū no katachi, Nihon no niwa (宇宙のかたち 日本の庭). Tokyo: Sekai Bunkasha, 1998. ISBN 4-7966-0056-6. (Title means "Japanese gardens in the presence of the cosmos".)
- Iro wa koto no ha (色はことのは) / Feel the Colors. Tokyo: Kentōsha, 2003. ISBN 4-344-00407-8.
- Burū rōtasu (ブルー・ロータス). Tokyo: Hyōgensha, 2005. ISBN 4-8282-0506-3. (Title means "Blue lotus".)

== Compact discs ==
- Masailand (1981)
- Dry and Wet (1981)
- Night Trip (1981)
- Timeless (1981)
- Zebra (Jack DeJohnette) (1989)

Directstep (Herbie Hancock) (1979)

== Video/multimedia productions ==
- Nō no shima (脳の縞, 1993)
- Zebra Fantasy (1996)
- The Song of Africa (1997)
- Kyō no niwa (京の庭, 1998)
- Mandala Cosmology (2000)
- Zebra (2001)
