= Zebra (Jack DeJohnette album) =

1989 soundtrack album by Jack DeJohnette

Soundtrack album by Jack DeJohnette
- Released: 1989
- Recorded: May 8–10, 1985
- Genre: Jazz
- Length: 40:43
- Label: MCA
- Producer: Kenny Inaoka & Jack DeJohnette

Jack DeJohnette chronology
Audio-Visualscapes (1988)	Zebra (1989)	Parallel Realities (1990)

Professional ratings
Review scores
Source	Rating
AllMusic	2/5 stars
The Penguin Guide to Jazz	2.5/4 stars

Zebra is an album by Jack DeJohnette featuring trumpeter Lester Bowie recorded in 1985 for the video program titled "Tadayuki Naito/Zebra" and released on the MCA label in 1989.

The AllMusic review of Zebra by Scott Yanow states: "The performances are moody and has its colorful moments... Superior background music, recommended mostly to Jack DeJohnette completists". The Penguin Guide to Jazz wrote that it was "Not really a jazz album at all, but well worth having for some striking atmospheric music."

== Track listing ==
All tracks are written by Jack DeJohnette.

No.	Title	Length
1.	"Ntoro I"	8:40
2.	"Jongo"	4:53
3.	"Aho"	9:42
4.	"Kpledzo"	7:58
5.	"Ntoro II"	9:17

- Recorded at Grog Kill Studio, Woodstock, NY, on May 8–10, 1985

== Personnel ==
- Jack DeJohnette – synthesizer
- Lester Bowie – trumpet (tracks 1, 3 & 5)
