= Return (Jack DeJohnette album) =

Studio album by Jack DeJohnette
- Released: April 2016
- Studio: Eastside (NYC)
- Genre: Jazz
- Length: 38:19
- Label: Newvelle NV002LP
- Producers: Elan Mehler, Jean-Christophe Morisseau

Jack DeJohnette chronology
Made in Chicago (2015)	Return (2016)	In Movement (2016)

Professional ratings
Review scores
Source	Rating
All About Jazz	4.5/5 stars

Return is a studio album by American jazz musician Jack DeJohnette. It was released in France via Newvelle Records label. Return is the label's second release and available in vinyl only by subscription only.

== Background ==
Return is his first solo piano record in some 30 years (preceded by The Jack DeJohnette Piano Album), hence the album title “Return”. The album contains 10 solo piano pieces, nine of them DeJohnette originals. "Ode to Satie" pays tribute to the short, atmospheric Gymnopedies composed by French pianist Erik Satie in the late 1800s. "Dervish Trance" takes its cue from the whirling dances of the Sufi tradition. "Lidya" is dedicated to DeJohnette's wife. The cover photo is from the portfolio of French travel photographer Bernard Plossu. The inner sleeve reproduces a poem by Pulitzer Prize-winner American poet and educator Tracy K. Smith. To record the album, DeJohnette used a handmade Italian 9' Fazioli Pianoforti piano that produces a gorgeous sound with dynamics rarely found on piano recordings. The tracks were digitally recorded at 24 bits/88.2 kHz by Marc Urselli at Eastside Sound Recording Studios in New York City and mixed to vinyl with an analog console. The album was pressed on clear 180-gram vinyl in France.

== Reception ==
Jeff Wilson of The Absolute Sound stated "Return is his first solo album on the ivories: it’s just him and a nine-foot Fazioli grand piano... The sound is close-up and immediate, allowing DeJohnette to play with a subtlety that would be lost with more remote miking and letting the listener feel the full weight of the lower notes of the piano. Return is a lovely album that reveals yet another side to Jack DeJohnette". Karl Ackermann of All About Jazz commented "The compositions, while translated in an unpretentious way, often sound simpler than they are. In DeJohnette's album notes, he acknowledges that he did not overthink the process of recording the album, saying that he wanted the flow to be natural; the title referring to a return to uncomplicated beauty. He has achieved just that". Nate Chinen of The New York Times added that "it’s an album of careful contemplation and obvious personal stake. The piano goes even farther back than the drums for Mr. DeJohnette, whose style on “Return” is austere but sonorous, with viscosity in his touch and use of pedal sustain". Jeff Krow of Audiophile Audition wrote "The crystalline acoustics feature crisp pedal sustain, and the high register notes are almost piercing in their clarity. This is contemplative music, highly percussive, rhythmic, with deeply felt emotion. Jack expresses his musical talents with vibrant colors and sonorous tone".

== Track listing ==
All tracks are written by Jack DeJohnette except for "Ponte De Areia" written by Fernando Brant and Milton Nascimento.

No.	Title	Length
1.	"Ode to Satie"	4:53
2.	"Ebony"	4:00
3.	"Silver Hollow"	5:11
4.	"Lydia"	3:34
5.	"Blue"	2:01
6.	"The Dervish Trance"	4:16
7.	"Indigo Dreamscapes"	2:40
8.	"Song for World Forgiveness"	4:22
9.	"Exotic Isles"	3:56
10.	"Ponte De Areia"	3:26
Total length:		38:19

== Personnel ==
- Jack DeJohnette – piano

Production

- Elan Mehler – producer
- Jean-Christophe Morisseau – producer
- Marc Urselli – engineer (recording)
- Alex DeTurk – engineer (mastering)
- Andrew Burke – art direction
