= Yucco Miller =

Japanese musician and YouTuber

Yucco Miller ユッコ・ミラー
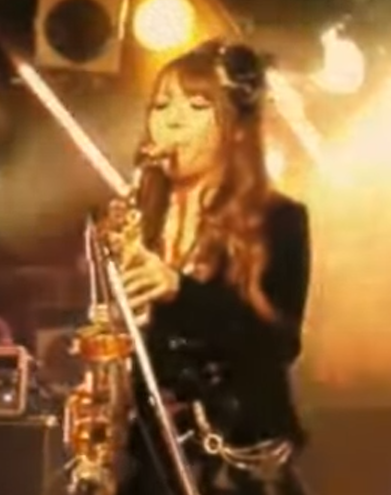
- Yucco Miller in 2012

Background information
- Also known as: Yucco (ユッコ)
- Born: Yukiko Onishi (大西由希子); December 25, 1990 (age 35); Ise, Mie, Japan
- Genres: Jazz; jazz fusion
- Occupations: Saxophonist; composer; orchestrator; singer; YouTuber
- Instruments: Alto saxophone; tenor saxophone; soprano saxophone; baritone saxophone; EWI; Recorder
- Label: King Records (2016–present)

YouTube information
- Channel: Yucco Miller
- Years active: 2018–present
- Genres: Music; gaming
- Subscribers: 221 thousand
- Views: 49.4 million
- Last updated: October 22, 2025

Yukiko Onishi (大西 由希子, Ōnishi Yukiko; born December 25, 1990), known as Yucco Miller (ユッコ・ミラー, Yukko Mirā) is a Japanese jazz and jazz fusion saxophonist, composer and YouTuber. She is known for her pink-dyed hair and being a popular saxophone player, appearing in overseas jazz festivals in South Korea and Malaysia while also appearing on many television programs.

== Early life and education ==
Miller was born in Ise, Mie, Japan. At the recommendation of her mother, she started learning the piano when she was 3 years old. She disliked the classes so much that she would purposely disappear from the class. In her first year at Kogakkan Junior and Senior High School, her friend wanted to try to join the brass band club and Miller decided that she would try as well. She started playing the saxophone in the club.

During her second year, she would do live performances on a pedestrian bridge after school, and received her first tip from a man in work clothes. That same year, she went to see a performance of the Glenn Miller Orchestra, and after their performance she waited for them afterwards to play the saxophone, which impressed the members. The members asked if she could join them, but she refused citing her school. She would later collaborate with them multiple times later in her career.

She studied under Eric Marienthal, Tetsuro Kawashima, and Ken Kawada, and made her professional debut at the age of 19.

== Career ==
On September 7, 2016, she released her first album, Yucco Miller from King Records. It was produced in New York by Lonnie Plaxico and has been featured in many media outlets, becoming a bestseller.

On March 14, 2018, her second album Saxonic was released. A collaboration song composed by Daimaou Kosaka, was also included and attracted attention from the media. The album would later win the Album of the Year award in the "new star" category in the 2018 Jazz Japan Awards.

In September 2019, her third album Kind of Pink was released, with Grammy-winning musician David Matthews participating in the arrangement and accompanying her on piano. Her official fan club "Miller Crew" was formed in 2020.

She has appeared in the official promotion video of the Akai speaker built-in wind synthesizer Ewi Solo and for the Yamaha Digital Saxophone.

On October 13, 2021, her 4th album Colorful Drops was released, where she also sang on the last track, "Fly Me To The Moon".
