= Michael Cain (musician) =

American pianist and composer (born 1966)

- Born: April 2, 1966 (age 60); Los Angeles, California
- Genres: Classical, jazz, pop
- Occupation: Musician
- Instrument: Piano

Michael Cain (born April 2, 1966) is a pianist and composer.

== Biography ==
Cain attended several universities starting with the University of North Texas. Although initially a jazz major, he found that classical music was occupying more of his time and switched to that major. From there he moved to Los Angeles and continued to study classical piano at the University of Southern California, and finally ended up at the California Institute of the Arts in Valencia, CA., where he did both undergraduate and graduate work. Cain received a Bachelor's degree in jazz piano in 1988, and a Master's degree in fine arts in 1990.

Cain moved to New York in 1990 and began performing with many members of M-Base, a Brooklyn-based collective of musicians, initially with Greg Osby and later with Robin Eubanks and Lonnie Plaxico among others. That same year he recorded his first CD as a leader, Strange Omen, for the Candid label, a trio recording that features Glen Velez on hand percussion and Bruce Saunders on guitar. Later that year Cain started playing with Jack DeJohnette and joined his group Special Edition.

In 1991, Cain also began playing with the Anthony Cox quartet which featured Dewey Redman on saxophone and Billy Higgins on drums. That group did several European tours and recorded the albums Dark Metals (Antilles Records), and Factor of Faces (Minor Music), which also featured Ralph Peterson on drums.

From 1995 to 1997, Cain was an assistant professor in the Jazz and Contemporary Media Department at the Eastman School of Music in Rochester, New York State.

In 1997, Cain joined the faculty at the New England Conservatory of Music in Boston where he directed several ensembles, taught classes on rhythm analysis, and taught private piano. During the 1997-98 school year Cain served as the school's Diversity Coordinator, an administrative position that focused on issues of diversity in all its implications at the university level. From 1999 to the present, Cain has been the director of the "Digital Playground", a music education and recording program at the Hoboken Charter School in Hoboken, New Jersey. This program teaches music to students from grades 3-12 by helping enable them to create, record, and distribute their own music.

Cain was musical director for the Jose Limón Dance Company's New York premiere of Crossroads (2001), a collaboration between composer James Newton and choreographer Donald McKayle.

During his professional career as a pianist, he has played with and for musicians such as Ravi Coltrane, Billy Higgins, Marlena Shaw, Gerald Wilson, James Newton, Billy Hart, Anthony Cox, Greg Osby, Robin Eubanks, Lonnie Plaxico, Jack DeJohnette, Ralph Peterson, Dave Holland, Bobby McFerrin, Meshell Ndegeocello, Carlos Ward, Ray Anderson, Charles Neville, Hassan Hakmoun, Oliver Lake, Reggie Workman, Mýa, Kip Hanrahan, Noreaga, Cindy Blackman, Joshua Redman, Victor Bailey, Bobby Previte, Frank Lacy, Bennie Maupin, Pheeroan Aklaff, Eric Person, Gary Thomas, Vernon Reid, Marty Ehrlich, Gene Jackson, James Genus, Steve Swallow, Andrew Cyrille, Steve Coleman, John Scofield, Jeff "Tain" Watts, Stanley Turrentine, Don Alias, and many others.

In 2008, Cain joined the Faculty of Music at Brandon University in Brandon, Manitoba, Canada, where he leads several ensembles, and teaches jazz curriculum and piano.

The 2015 album Sola was well reviewed. JazzdaGama said "Michael Cain feels music passionately and colourfully and the expert musicianship and loving care that he puts into his work is obvious." The Huffington Post's review noted that "...Cain's most recent work has had a distinctively electronic bent to it with colors and textures that seem to borrow from elements of jazz, hip hop and Electronic Dance Music."

Cain's most recent release is Hoo Doo, featuring Cain – keyboards, Eric Platz and Angelo Stokes – drums, Scott Brown and Matthew Fricke – guitar, Aren Teerhuis – saxophone, Stormy Allen – trombone and Tondrae Kemp – vocals

== Discography ==
=== As leader/co-leader ===
Year recorded	Title	Label	Notes
1990	Strange Omen	Candid	Trio, with Bruce Saunders (guitar), Glen Velez (percussion)
1991	What Means This?	Candid	Quartet, with Anthony Cox (bass), Marvin "Smitty" Smith (drums), Paul Hannah (percussion)
1994	Evidence of Things Unseen	MA	Solo piano
1996	Circa	ECM	Trio, with Ralph Alessi (trumpet, flugelhorn), Peter Epstein (soprano sax, tenor sax)
2000	Pfhew	MA	Trio, with Ralph Alessi (trumpet, flugelhorn), Peter Epstein (soprano sax, tenor sax)
	Brooklyn Waters	Telepathy	Duo, co-led with Pheeroan akLaff (drums, percussion)
2008?	The Green Eyed Keeper	Native Drum Music	
	Indira	Muzak/ENJA	
2011	Solo	Native Drum Music	Solo piano, synthesizer, electronics
2015	Sola	Native Drum Music	Keys/programming
2018	Hoo Doo	Native Drum Music	Keys

=== As sideman ===
With Ravi Coltrane

- Moving Pictures (RCA/BMG)

With Jack DeJohnette

- Earthwalk (Blue Note, 1991)
- Music for the Fifth World (Manhattan, 1992)
- Extra Special Edition (Blue Note, 1994)
- Dancing with Nature Spirits (ECM, 1995)
- Oneness (ECM, 1997)

With Robin Eubanks

- Mental Images (JMT, 1994)

With Gary Thomas

- The Kold Kage (JMT, 1991)

With Gerald Wilson

- Jenna (Discovery, 1989)
