= Extra Special Edition =

Studio album by Jack DeJohnette
- Released: 1994
- Recorded: 1994
- Genre: Jazz
- Length: 70:07
- Label: Blue Note
- Producer: Jack DeJohnette

Jack DeJohnette chronology
| Music for the Fifth World (1993) | Extra Special Edition (1994) | Homecoming (1995) |

Professional ratings
Review scores
| Source | Rating |
|---|---|
| Allmusic | 2/5 stars |

Extra Special is an album by drummer Jack DeJohnette's Special Edition, featuring saxophonist Gary Thomas, pianist Michael Cain and bassist Lonnie Plaxico, with vocalist Bobby McFerrin, percussionist Paul Grassi and guitarist Marvin Sewell also appearing. Recorded in 1994 and released on the Blue Note label. The Allmusic review by Scott Yanow states, "the mostly-original program not only lacks more than one or two strong melodies but any real development as well, particularly on the selections that have McFerrin. Performances often start in what could just as well be the middle and end inconclusively with many of the pieces being little more than funky riffs for the rhythm section".

== Track listing ==
All compositions by Jack DeJohnette except as indicated

1. "Numoessence" – 5:24
2. "Elmer Wudd?" – 8:36
3. "Then There Was Light" (Michael Cain, Bobby McFerrin) – 4:57
4. "You Can Get There" – 4:44
5. "Inside the Kaleidoscope" – 3:25
6. "Ha Chik Kah" – 5:19
7. "Seventh D" – 8:19
8. "Rituals of Spring" – 5:56
9. "Liquid Over Tones" – 1:40
10. "Speaking in Tongues" – 6:08
11. "Summertime" (George Gershwin, Ira Gershwin, DuBose Heyward) – 10:00
12. "Memories of Sedona" – 5:39

== Personnel ==
- Jack DeJohnette – drums, percussion, triangle, ocarina
- Michael Cain – piano, keyboards (tracks 2–4, 6–8 & 10–12)
- Gary Thomas – tenor saxophone, soprano saxophone, flute (tracks 1, 4–8, 10 & 11)
- Lonnie Plaxico – electric bass, acoustic bass (tracks 1, 4–8 & 10–12)
- Bobby McFerrin – vocals (tracks 1–6 & 10)
- Paul Grassi – percussion (tracks 1, 4–6, 8 & 10)
- Marvin Sewell – guitar (tracks 1, 4–8, 10 & 11)
