= Invisible Nature =

2002 live album by John Surman & Jack DeJohnette

Live album by John Surman & Jack DeJohnette
- Released: 2002
- Recorded: November 1999
- Venue: Tampere Jazz Happening; JazzFest Berlin
- Genre: Jazz
- Length: 75:10
- Label: ECM; ECM 1796
- Producer: Manfred Eicher

John Surman chronology
Coruscating (1999)	Invisible Nature (2002)	Free and Equal (2001)

Jack DeJohnette chronology
Oneness (1997)	Invisible Nature (2002)	Music from the Hearts of the Masters (2005)

Invisible Nature is a live album by English jazz saxophonist John Surman and American jazz drummer Jack DeJohnette, recorded at Tampere Jazz Happening and JazzFest Berlin in November 1999 and released on ECM Records in 2002.

== Reception ==
The AllMusic review by Scott Yanow stated: "The performances are atmospheric, with both players utilizing electronics in spots while retaining their own musical personalities. Surman has long been a very flexible and mostly laid-back player, while DeJohnette also has the ability to fit in almost anywhere. Rather than individual melodies or solos, this CD is most notable for its overall feel and the blend between these two unique musicians."

Professional ratings
Review scores
Source	Rating
AllMusic	4/5 stars
The Penguin Guide to Jazz Recordings	3.5/4 stars

== Track listing ==
All compositions by John Surman and Jack DeJohnette.

1. "Mysterium" – 15:57
2. "Rising Tide" – 9:32
3. "Outback Spirits" – 12:30
4. "Underground Movement" – 9:45
5. "Ganges Groove" – 6:36
6. "Fair Trade" – 11:21
7. "Song for World Forgiveness" – 9:29

== Personnel ==
- John Surman – soprano and baritone saxophones, bass clarinet, synthesizer
- Jack DeJohnette – drums, electronic percussion, piano
