= Tin Can Alley (album) =

Studio album by Jack DeJohnette's Special Edition
- Released: 1981
- Recorded: September 1980
- Studios: Tonstudio Bauer; Ludwigsburg, West Germany
- Genre: Jazz
- Label: ECM 1189
- Producer: Manfred Eicher

Jack DeJohnette chronology
In Europe (1980)	Tin Can Alley (1981)	Inflation Blues (1983)

Tin Can Alley is a studio album by Jack DeJohnette's Special Edition, recorded in September 1980 and released on ECM Records the following year. The quartet features saxophonists Chico Freeman and John Purcell and bassist Peter Warren.

== Reception ==
Professional ratings
Review scores
Source	Rating
AllMusic	4/5 stars
The Penguin Guide to Jazz Recordings	3.5/4 stars
The Rolling Stone Jazz Record Guide	3/5 stars

The AllMusic review by Scott Yanow states: "The wide-ranging music on this fine set ranges from African rhythms and colors reminiscent of Duke Ellington to some boppish moments and a bit of light funk. Although not the most powerful version of Special Edition, this set is recommended."

== Track listing ==
All compositions by Jack DeJohnette except as indicated

1. "Tin Can Alley" - 10:46
2. "Pastel Rhapsody" - 13:29
3. "Riff Raff" (Peter Warren) - 6:54
4. "The Gri Gri Man" - 4:44
5. "I Know" - 10:19

== Personnel ==
Jack DeJohnette's Special Edition

- Jack DeJohnette – drums, piano, organ, conga, timpani, vocal
- Chico Freeman – tenor saxophone, flute, bass clarinet
- John Purcell – baritone saxophone, alto saxophone, flute
- Peter Warren – bass, cello
