= Peace Time =

Studio album by Jack DeJohnette
- Released: 2007
- Recorded: October 2006
- Genre: Jazz, new age
- Length: 62:07
- Label: Golden Beams

Jack DeJohnette chronology
| Saudades (2006) | Peace Time (2007) | Music We Are (2009) |

Peace Time is an album by Jack DeJohnette, recorded in 2006 and released on Golden Beams Records in 2007.

== Reception ==
Professional ratings
Review scores
| Source | Rating |
|---|---|
| AllMusic | 3.5/5 stars |
| The Penguin Guide to Jazz Recordings | 2/4 stars |

The AllMusic review by Michael G. Nastos states, "Jack DeJohnette's follow-up recording to Music in the Key of Om is a similarly meditative effort where he plays all the instruments, assumedly overdubbed, creating a wash of ambient ritual sound texts in a single continuous piece running over 60 minutes... This music demonstrates a fascinating aspect of DeJohnette's musical life, liberating for him for sure, and a statement that is meaningful. Be patient; breathe deeply of clean air, and drink of this truly reflective listening experience that deserves its own audience".

== Awards ==
The album was awarded the Grammy Award for Best New Age Album in 2008.

== Track listing ==
1. "Peace Time" (Jack DeJohnette) - 62:07

== Personnel ==
- Jack DeJohnette – synthesizer, percussion
