= Circa (Michael Cain album) =

Studio album by Michael Cain/Ralph Alessi/Peter Epstein
- Released: 1997
- Recorded: August 1996
- Genre: Jazz
- Length: 53:31
- Label: ECM; ECM 1622
- Producer: Manfred Eicher

Michael Cain chronology
Indira (1995)	Circa (1997)	The Evidence of Things Unseen (1997)

Circa is an album by the American jazz pianist and composer Michael Cain recorded in August 1996 and released on ECM the following year. The trio features trumpeter Ralph Alessi and saxophonist Peter Epstein.

== Reception ==
The AllMusic review by Scott Yanow states: "Ranging from what sounds like chamber music (it is often difficult to determine when the musicians are improvising) to stretched-out long tones and heated sections, this episodic and continually intriguing music is never predictable and rewards repeated listenings."

Professional ratings
Review scores
Source	Rating
AllMusic	4/5 stars
The Penguin Guide to Jazz Recordings	4/4 stars

== Track listing ==
All compositions are by Michael Cain, except where indicated.

1. "Siegfried and Roy" – 1:26
2. "Social Drones" (Ralph Alessi) – 2:46
3. "Ped Cruc" – 3:27
4. "Miss M." (Alessi) – 6:22
5. "Circa" – 4:20
6. "Egg" – 6:08
7. "Top o' the Dunes" – 7:19
8. "And Their White Tigers" – 4:32
9. "Red Rock Rain" – 4:55
10. "The Suchness of Dory Philpott" (Alessi, Cain) – 4:09
11. "Marche" (Alessi) – 8:20

== Personnel ==
- Michael Cain – piano
- Ralph Alessi – trumpet, flugelhorn
- Peter Epstein – soprano and tenor saxophones
