= Music for the Fifth World =

Studio album by Jack DeJohnette
- Released: 1993
- Recorded: February 1992
- Genre: Jazz
- Length: 60:09
- Label: Manhattan
- Producer: Jack DeJohnette

Jack DeJohnette chronology
Earthwalk (1991)	Music for the Fifth World (1993)	Extra Special Edition (1995)

Professional ratings
Review scores
Source	Rating
AllMusic	4/5 stars

Music for the Fifth World is an album by Jack DeJohnette, featuring performances with Will Calhoun, Michael Cain, Vernon Reid, Lonnie Plaxico and John Scofield plus vocalists, recorded in 1992 and released on the Manhattan label in 1993.

== Reception ==
The AllMusic review by Scott Yanow states, "The music is stimulating if not as essential as DeJohnette's earlier work with Special Edition". A JazzTimes reviewer selected it in 2012 as one of DeJohnette's key albums and described it as an "ambitious homage to Native American culture".

== Track listing ==
All compositions by Jack DeJohnette except as indicated

1. "Fifth World Anthem" – 9:27
2. "Dohiyi Circle No. 1" (Joan Henry) – 2:56
3. "Miles" – 8:15
4. "Two Guitar Chant/Dohiyi (DeJohnette, Henry) – 5:16
5. "Deception Blues" – 4:55
6. "Witchi-Tai-To" (Jim Pepper additional lyrics by Henry) – 6:11
7. "Darkness to Light" – 12:34
8. "Dohiyi Circle No. 2" (Henry) – 2:25
9. "Aboriginal Dream Time" – 8:10

- Recorded at Clinton Studios, N.Y in February, 1992

== Personnel ==
- Jack DeJohnette – drums, vocals, ceremonial drum, keyboards, keyboard bass, synthesizer, percussion
- Vernon Reid – guitar, vocals
- John Scofield – guitar
- Will Calhoun – drums, vocals, ceremonial drum
- Lonnie Plaxico – bass
- Michael Cain – piano, synthesizer
- Robert Rosario – vocals, ceremonial drum
- Denis Yerry – ceremonial drum
- Joan Henry – percussion, vocals
- Farah DeJohnette, Ethel Calhoun – vocals
