= Sound Travels =

Studio album by Jack DeJohnette
- Released: January 17, 2012
- Recorded: 2011
- Studios: Avatar (New York, New York); The Clubhouse (Rheinbeck, New York); Bass Hit (New York, New York); Hornsby Studio
- Genres: Jazz, world music
- Length: 46:14
- Labels: eOne/Golden Beams; EOM-CD-2403
- Producer: Robert Sadin

Jack DeJohnette chronology
Music We Are (2009)	Sound Travels (2012)	Made in Chicago (2015)

Sound Travels is an album by drummer and composer Jack DeJohnette, recorded in 2011 and released on the eOne Music/Golden Beams label. A re-recorded version of the song "Dirty Ground" would be included on the 2017 album Hudson.

== Reception ==
Professional ratings
Review scores
Source	Rating
AllMusic	4/5 stars
All About Jazz	4.5/5 stars
PopMatters	7/10 stars

The AllMusic review by Thom Jurek states, "Sound Travels is a current, understated, well-disciplined glimpse into DeJohnette's current musical world view, which is worth celebrating for its own sake". All About Jazz reviewer John Kelman said, "As he heads into his eighth decade on the planet and approaches his sixth in music, DeJohnette is clearly healthy, happy and on a creative roll. Sound Travels is a powerful celebration, culmination and affirmation of an artist who may be paying it forward to his younger players, but remains the humble and appreciative reciprocal recipient on a collaborative date where there's little to prove but plenty to say". PopMatters' John Garratt said, "Sound Travels may not contribute new and radical ideas to Jack DeJohnette’s overall canon of works, but it is a fun, catchy by-product of his “me-time," relaxed and competing for nothing".

== Track listing ==
All compositions by Jack DeJohnette except where noted.

1. "Enter Here" – 2:14
2. "Salsa for Luisoto" (DeJohnette, Bruce Hornsby) – 6:56
3. "Dirty Ground" – 4:49
4. "New Muse" – 6:02
5. "Sonny Light" – 5:41
6. "Sound Travels" – 1:42
7. "Oneness" – 5:57
8. "Indigo Dreamscapes" – 8:02
9. "Home" – 4:34

== Personnel ==
- Jack DeJohnette – drums, piano, resonating bells
- Ambrose Akinmusire – trumpet (tracks 2, 4 & 5)
- Tim Ries – soprano saxophone, tenor saxophone (tracks 3–5 & 8)
- Lionel Loueke – electric guitar (tracks 2, 3 & 6)
- Esperanza Spalding – bass, electric bass, vocals (tracks 2–6 & 8)
- Luisito Quintero – percussion, vocals (tracks 2, 3 & 5–8)
- Jason Moran – piano (track 8)
- Bruce Hornsby – vocals (track 3)
- Bobby McFerrin – vocals, percussion (track 7)
