= Sorcery (Jack DeJohnette album) =

Studio album by Jack DeJohnette
- Released: 1974
- Recorded: March & May, 1974
- Studio: Willow, New York & Bearsville, Bearsville, NY
- Genre: Jazz-funk
- Length: 41:04
- Label: Prestige
- Producer: Jack DeJohnette

Jack DeJohnette chronology
Jackeyboard (1973)	Sorcery (1974)	Cosmic Chicken (1975)

Professional ratings
Review scores
Source	Rating
AllMusic	1.5/5 stars
The Penguin Guide to Jazz Recordings	3/4 stars
The Rolling Stone Jazz Record Guide	3/5 stars

Sorcery is an album by Jack DeJohnette, featuring Bennie Maupin, John Abercrombie, Mick Goodrick, Dave Holland and Michael Fellerman, recorded in 1974 and released on the Prestige label. The AllMusic review by Scott Yanow states, "A lot of rambling takes place on this interesting but erratic CD reissue... While one admires DeJohnette's willingness to take chances, this music has not dated well".

== Track listing ==
All compositions by Jack DeJohnette except as indicated

1. "Sorcery, No. 1" - 13:50
2. "The Right Time" - 2:21
3. "The Rock Thing" - 4:14
4. "The Reverend King Suite: Reverend King/Obstructions/The Fatal Shot/Mourning/Unrest/New Spirits on the Horizon" (John Coltrane/DeJohnette) - 14:19
5. "Four Levels of Joy" - 3:09
6. "Epilog" (DeJohnette, Dave Holland) - 3:11

- Recorded at Willow, NY, in March 1974 and at Bearsville Studios, NY, in May 1974

== Personnel ==
- Jack DeJohnette: drums, keyboards, C-melody saxophone
- Bennie Maupin: bass clarinet
- John Abercrombie, Mick Goodrick: guitars
- Dave Holland: bass
- Michael Fellerman: metaphone 1, trombone
