= Peter Warren (American musician) =

American jazz musician

Peter Warren (born November 21, 1935, Hempstead, New York) is an American double-bassist and cellist.

Warren learned cello as a child and studied the instrument formally, giving a recital at Carnegie Hall in 1953 and studying at Juilliard School. He also played with the Atlanta Symphony Orchestra before switching to double-bass and studying jazz under Chuck Israels. He was Dionne Warwick's touring bassist from 1965 to 1967; following this he played with David Izenzon in the New York Bass Revolution. He worked in Belgium in the early 1970s, playing with Chick Corea, John Surman, Rolf Kuhn, Joachim Kuhn, Jean-Luc Ponty, Don Cherry, Terumasa Hino, Masahiko Sato, Albert Mangelsdorff, John Tchicai, Anthony Braxton, and Tomasz Stańko. In 1974 he settled once again in the US, playing with Jack DeJohnette and Carla Bley, and in 1976 he received a National Endowment for the Arts grant in cello composition. Later, he worked with Mike Stern and Jack DeJohnette (early 1980s).

== Discography ==
- Bass Is (Enja Records, 1970)
- Solidarity (JAPO Records, 1981)
