= Made in Chicago (Jack DeJohnette album) =

2015 live jazz album by Jack DeJohnette and others

Live album by Jack DeJohnette
- Released: March 10, 2015
- Recorded: August 29, 2013
- Venues: Chicago Jazz Festival; Jay Pritzker Pavilion; Millennium Park, Chicago
- Genre: Jazz
- Label: ECM 2392
- Producers: Jack DeJohnette, Dave Love

Jack DeJohnette chronology
Sound Travels (2012)	Made in Chicago (2015)	In Movement (2016)

Made in Chicago is a live album by drummer and composer Jack DeJohnette, recorded at the 35th Chicago Jazz Festival on August 29, 2013, and released on ECM Records in March 2015. The quintet features fellow Chicagoan musicians pianist Muhal Richard Abrams, bassist Larry Gray and saxophonists Roscoe Mitchell and Henry Threadgill—a reunion of DeJohnette with colleagues from Chicago's Association for the Advancement of Creative Musicians.

== Reception ==
Professional ratings
Review scores
Source	Rating
All About Jazz	5/5 stars
AllMusic	3.5/5 stars
The Daily Telegraph	4/5 stars
The Guardian	3/5 stars
PopMatters	8/10 stars

The AllMusic review by Thom Jurek states, "This document is important not only for the historic nature of the reunion of vanguard jazz luminaries, but as the spark for further exploration."

The Guardian's John Fordham said, "It’s not always comfortable listening, but it’s an intriguing reunion of jazz pioneers."

All About Jazz reviewer Karl Ackermann said, "DeJohnette, was given free rein to assemble a band and create a program and with the fiftieth anniversary of the AACM at hand he could not have paid a more fitting tribute to an organization that fosters imaginative thinking. More to the point of the music, to hear these veterans express the love of their work in a powerful, forward looking set that's not likely to be repeated."

The Daily Telegraph's Ivan Hewitt noted, "the range of expression these five players draw from their instruments is astonishing... This album may not be an easy listen, but it’s certainly a rewarding one."

PopMatters' John Garratt said, "All things considered, Made in Chicago is an aggressively great album, both crazy and tender in its art... It’s an electrifying concert, a rare reunion (a word that sounds too trite at the moment) and a far out aggregate."

Listing it among his ten favorite albums of the 2010s, Rob Shepherd of PostGenre noted, "[Made in Chicago] is already a lasting tribute to not just the AACM and its enduring legacy but the city of Chicago itself which has fostered such music."

== Track listing ==
1. "Chant" (Roscoe Mitchell) – 16:56
2. "Jack 5" (Muhal Richard Abrams) – 14:53
3. "This" (Mitchell) – 12:13
4. "Museum of Time" (Jack DeJohnette) – 13:37
5. "Leave Don't Go Away" (Henry Threadgill) – 10:19
6. Announcement – 3:29
7. "Ten Minutes" (Abrams, DeJohnette, Larry Gray, Mitchell, Threadgill) – 6:09

== Personnel ==
- Jack DeJohnette – drums, percussion
- Muhal Richard Abrams – piano
- Larry Gray – double bass, cello
- Roscoe Mitchell – sopranino saxophone, soprano saxophone, alto saxophone, flute, recorder
- Henry Threadgill – alto saxophone, bass flute
