= Earthwalk =

1991 album by Jack DeJohnette's Special Edition

Studio album by Jack DeJohnette
- Released: 1991
- Recorded: June 1991
- Studio: Dreamland (Hurley, New York)
- Genre: Jazz
- Length: 72:53
- Label: Blue Note
- Producer: Jack DeJohnette

Jack DeJohnette chronology
Parallel Realities (1990)	Earthwalk (1991)	Music for the Fifth World (1992)

Professional ratings
Review scores
Source	Rating
AllMusic	4/5 stars

Earthwalk is an album by drummer Jack DeJohnette's Special Edition, featuring alto saxophonist Greg Osby, tenor saxophonist Gary Thomas, pianist Michael Cain and bassist Lonnie Plaxico, recorded in 1991 and released on the Blue Note label.

== Track listing ==
All compositions by Jack DeJohnette

1. "It's Time to Wake Up and Dream" – 5:30
2. "Blue" – 6:18
3. "Where or Wayne" – 9:44
4. "Priestesses of the Mist" – 7:44
5. "Earth Walk" – 13:05
6. "On Golden Beams" – 5:16
7. "One on One" – 11:18
8. "Lydia" – 2:24
9. "Monk's Plumb" – 12:08
10. "It's Time to Wake Up and Dream" [Alternate Version] – 0:50
  - Recorded at Dreamland Recording Studios, West Hurley, NY, in June 1991

== Personnel ==
- Jack DeJohnette – drums
- Michael Cain – midi piano, korg keyboards
- Gary Thomas – tenor saxophone, flute
- Greg Osby – alto saxophone, soprano saxophone
- Lonnie Plaxico – electric bass, acoustic bass
- Joan Henry – animal sound on "Earth Walk"
