= In Movement =

Studio album by Jack DeJohnette with Ravi Coltrane and Matthew Garrison
- Released: May 6, 2016
- Recorded: October 2015
- Studio: Avatar, New York City
- Genre: Jazz
- Length: 54:21
- Label: ECM; ECM 2392
- Producer: Manfred Eicher

Jack DeJohnette chronology
Returns (2016)	In Movement (2016)	Hudson (2017)

In Movement is a studio album by American jazz drummer and composer Jack DeJohnette with saxophonist Ravi Coltrane and bassist Matthew Garrison recorded in 2015 and released on the ECM label.

== Reception ==
Professional ratings
Review scores
Source	Rating
All About Jazz	4/5 stars
AllMusic	3.5/5 stars
Elmore Magazine	96/100
Financial Times	5/5 stars
The Guardian	4/5 stars
The Irish Times	4/5 stars
Pitchfork	8.3
PopMatters	8/10 stars
RTÉ.ie	3.5/5 stars
The Times	3/5 stars

The AllMusic review by Thom Jurek states, "In Movement is a compelling first statement from a band who, despite generational differences, is connected through deep listening and harmonic intelligence. This group's future is rife with possibility". They also selected it as one of their Favorite Jazz Albums of 2016. The Guardian's John Fordham said, "this is a thoroughly contemporary set in its fusion of Ravi Coltrane’s lyricism (often on the piercing, silvery-toned sopranino sax), Garrison’s rockish bass sound and electronics, and DeJohnette’s dramatic punctuation ... It’s a partnership that gets the best out of its powerful participants". All About Jazz reviewer Karl Ackermann said, "As a drummer he runs the gamut from refined, light touches to visceral spontaneity. He finds perfect band mates in the always erudite and appealing playing of Ravi Coltrane and the refined musicality of Garrison. In Movement begs for a follow-up". Pitchfork's Seth Colter Walls noted, "Despite the grand shadows cast by their forbears, In Movement shows how both Ravi and Matthew have emerged as distinct instrumentalists on the contemporary jazz scene. And they have skills that match up with DeJohnette's own. No one in this group has to run from history, or overly fetishize it, in order to sound like an individual—a shared skill that makes In Movement a frequently spellbinding experience". PopMatters' Marshall Gu said, "DeJohnette isn’t the first name on the billing because of his seniority; he’s simultaneously solid power and liquid flexibility while Coltrane Jr. and Garrison Jr. ride on his unpredictable and buoyant rhythms (except for the two times Mr. DeJohnette plays keys, of course) ... All in all, this is excellent—one of the best releases of the year, jazz or otherwise".

== Track listing ==
All compositions by Ravi Coltrane, Jack DeJohnette and Matthew Garrison except where noted.

1. "Alabama" (John Coltrane) – 6:51
2. "In Movement" – 9:21
3. "Two Jimmys" – 8:14
4. "Blue in Green" (Miles Davis, Bill Evans) – 5:57
5. "Serpentine Fire" (Reginald Burke, Maurice White, Verdine White) – 9:02
6. "Lydia" (DeJohnette) – 4:46
7. "Rashied" (Ravi Coltrane, DeJohnette) – 5:48
8. "Soulful Ballad" (DeJohnette) – 4:22

== Personnel ==
- Jack DeJohnette – drums, piano, electronic percussion
- Ravi Coltrane – sopranino saxophone, soprano saxophone, tenor saxophone
- Matthew Garrison – electric bass, electronics
