= Music We Are =

Studio album by Jack DeJohnette, John Patitucci and Danilo Pérez
- Released: April 7, 2009
- Recorded: February 22–24, 2008
- Studio: NRS Recording Studios, Catskill, NY
- Genre: Jazz
- Length: 62:28
- Label: Golden Beams; KRM-CD-1150
- Producer: Jack DeJohnette

Jack DeJohnette chronology
Peace Time (2007)	Music We Are (2009)	Sound Travels (2012)

Music We Are is an album by Jack DeJohnette, recorded in 2008 and released on his Golden Beams label.

== Reception ==
Professional ratings
Review scores
Source	Rating
All About Jazz	4.5/5 stars
AllMusic	4/5 stars
The Guardian	3/5 stars
Jazzwise	4/5 stars
PopMatters	8/10 stars

The AllMusic review by Thom Jurek states, "This is a solidly enjoyable yet very expansive take on the piano trio format. It was obviously a blast to record it as well". All About Jazz reviewer John Kelman said, "A combination of original music and one relatively obscure Latin cover, Music We Are brings three friends together for a recording that, hopefully, signifies the beginning of a longer-term partnership". PopMatters' Will Layman said, "This is not really a classic jazz trio record. It’s much better than that. This new band, let us fervently hope, has much great music ahead of it. It is a more-than-worthy successor to the great Jack DeJohnette bands of the ‘80s and ‘90s, and Music We Are stands as the most complete and powerful compositional statement from the great drummer in over a decade. Which is say: wow". In Jazzwise, Stuart Nicholson wrote, "DeJohnette, Patitucci and Perez each possess an impressive CV that speaks of years of music making at the highest level of their profession and perhaps the most refreshing thing about this collection is that nobody feels the need to prove anything – that they are the fastest, the quickest, the most technically gifted, the most harmonically clever. They could do, but they don’t. Instead, they get inside the music, teasing it this way and that without feeling the inner necessity to flaunt their “supergroup” credentials". The Guardian's John Fordham stated, "DeJohnette is setting himself ever more fascinating rhythmic puzzles without compromising his awesome powers to push and swing – and this set on his own label couples those resources to a free improv, world music and at times semi-classical agenda that might surprise a few of his regular admirers. ... at its best, Music We Are sounds intriguingly like 21st-century Thelonious Monk music, a jazzy Gamelan band, or the work of a free-improvising Herbie Hancock. Its downsides are one or two colourless themes and occasional indecision about how long to free-fall before searching for a groove".

== Track listing ==
1. "Tango African" (Jack DeJohnette) – 5:31
2. "Earth Prayer" (DeJohnette, John Patitucci, Danilo Pérez) – 7:12
3. "Seventh D, 1st Movement" (DeJohnette) – 5:36
4. "Seventh D, 2nd Movement" (DeJohnette) – 4:37
5. "Soulful Ballad" (DeJohnette) – 3:53
6. "Earth Speaks" (DeJohnette, Patitucci, Pérez) – 5:02
7. "Cobilla" (Pérez) – 6:22
8. "Panama Viejo" (Ricardo Fabrega) – 5:03
9. "White" (Pérez) – 5:45
10. "Ode to MJQ" (DeJohnette, Patitucci, Pérez) – 9:37
11. "Michael" (Patitucci) – 3:50

== Personnel ==
- Jack DeJohnette – drums, melodica
- John Patitucci – upright bass, electric bass
- Danilo Pérez – piano, keyboard
