= In Europe (Jack DeJohnette album) =

Live album by Jack DeJohnette & New Directions
- Released: September 1980
- Recorded: June 9, 1979
- Venue: Mohren; Willisau, Switzerland
- Genre: Jazz, post-bop
- Length: 56:31
- Label: ECM 1157
- Producer: Manfred Eicher

Jack DeJohnette & New Directions chronology
| Special Edition (1980) | In Europe (1980) | Tin Can Alley (1981) |

In Europe is a live album by Jack DeJohnette and New Directions, recorded in June 1979 and released on ECM Records in September 1980. The quartet features trumpeter Lester Bowie, guitarist John Abercrombie, and bassist Eddie Gómez.

== Reception ==
Professional ratings
Review scores
| Source | Rating |
|---|---|
| AllMusic | 3.5/5 stars |
| Tom Hull | B+ |
| The Penguin Guide to Jazz Recordings | 3/4 stars |
| The Rolling Stone Jazz Record Guide | 3/5 stars |

"This group demonstrates what an extraordinary and exciting player DeJohnette can be," wrote Richard Cook and Brian Morton in their Penguin Guide to Jazz Recordings. "He never sounded as convincing in the studio—or at least under his own name ... though Abercrombie sounds oddly out of condition."

The AllMusic review by Scott Yanow states, "There are some colorful moments but overall the music is not all that memorable."

== Track listing ==
All compositions by Jack DeJohnette except as indicated

1. "Salsa for Eddie G." - 16:05
2. "Where or Wayne" - 12:33
3. "Bayou Fever" - 18:24
4. "Multo spiliagio" (Abercrombie, Bowie, DeJohnette, Gomez) - 9:33

== Personnel ==
New Directions

- Jack DeJohnette – drums, piano
- Lester Bowie – trumpet
- John Abercrombie – guitar, mandolin guitar
- Eddie Gómez – bass
