= Irresistible Forces =

Studio album by Jack DeJohnette's Special Edition
- Released: 1987
- Recorded: January 1987
- Studio: Master Sound Astoria Recording Studios and Kaufman Astoria Studios, Astoria, NY
- Genre: Jazz
- Length: 61:17
- Label: MCA/Impulse!
- Producer: Jack DeJohnette

Jack DeJohnette's Special Edition chronology
| In Our Style (1986) | Irresistible Forces (1987) | Audio-Visualscapes (1988) |

Professional ratings
Review scores
| Source | Rating |
|---|---|
| AllMusic | 4/5 stars |

Irresistible Forces is an album by Jack DeJohnette's Special Edition, with Greg Osby, Gary Thomas, Mick Goodrick, Lonnie Plaxico and Naná Vasconcelos as special guest. It was recorded in January 1987 and released the same year on the Impulse! label, at the time owned by MCA.

AllMusic's Scott Yanow wrote that "the somewhat unique music gives all of the musicians opportunities to express themselves and inspire each other."

== Track listing ==
All compositions by Jack DeJohnette except as indicated

1. "Introduction" - 0:41
2. "Irresistible Forces" - 7:48
3. "Prelúdio pra Nana" - 4:02
4. "Herbie's Hand Cocked" - 5:19
5. "Osthetics" (Greg Osby) - 7:32
6. "47th Groove" - 5:43
7. "Silver Hollow" - 6:56
8. "Interlude/Ponta de Areia" (Milton Nascimento) - 1:21
9. "Milton" - 7:56
10. "3rd World Anthem" [CD bonus track] - 13:02
11. "Conclusion" - 1:03

== Personnel ==
- Jack DeJohnette – drums, piano, drum machine, electronic keyboards
- Gary Thomas – tenor saxophone, flute, clarinet
- Greg Osby – alto saxophone, soprano saxophone
- Lonnie Plaxico – electric bass, double bass
- Mick Goodrick – electric guitar
- Naná Vasconcelos – percussion, vocals
