= Special Edition (Jack DeJohnette album) =

1980 studio album by Jack DeJohnette

Studio album by Jack DeJohnette
- Released: 1980
- Recorded: March 1979
- Studios: Generation Sound; New York City
- Genre: Jazz
- Length: 39:06
- Label: ECM 1152
- Producer: Jack DeJohnette

Jack DeJohnette chronology
Terje Rypdal / Miroslav Vitous / Jack DeJohnette (1978)	Special Edition (1980)	In Europe (1980)

Special Edition is an album by American jazz drummer Jack DeJohnette, recorded in March 1979 and released on ECM Records the following year. The quartet features reed players David Murray and Arthur Blythe and bassist and cellist Slip Warren.

== Critical reception ==
Professional ratings
Review scores
Source	Rating
AllMusic	5/5 stars
Tom Hull	B+
The Penguin Guide to Jazz Recordings	3.5/4 stars
The Rolling Stone Jazz Record Guide	4/5 stars
DownBeat	5/5 stars

The AllMusic review by Scott Yanow states: "The first (and mightiest) of Jack DeJohnette's Special Edition ensembles offered a sound that in many ways was revolutionary in modern contemporary and creative improvised music circa 1980... This CD deserves a definitive five-star rating for the lofty place it commands in the evolution of jazz headed toward new heights and horizons".

A JazzTimes reviewer selected it in 2012 as one of DeJohnette's key albums.

== Track listing ==
All compositions by Jack DeJohnette except as indicated

1. "One for Eric" - 9:52
2. "Zoot Suite" - 11:29
3. "Central Park West" (John Coltrane) - 3:16
4. "India" (Coltrane) - 6:02
5. "Journey to the Twin Planet" - 8:42

== Personnel ==
- Jack DeJohnette – drums, piano, melodica
- David Murray – tenor saxophone, bass clarinet
- Arthur Blythe – alto saxophone
- Peter "Slip" Warren – bass, cello
