= Inflation Blues =

Studio album by Jack DeJohnette's Special Edition
- Released: 1983
- Recorded: September 1982
- Studios: Power Station, New York City
- Genre: Jazz
- Label: ECM 1244
- Producer: Manfred Eicher

Jack DeJohnette chronology
Tin Can Alley (1981)	Inflation Blues (1983)	Album Album (1984)

Inflation Blues is an album by Jack DeJohnette's Special Edition, recorded in September 1982 and released on ECM Records the following year. The ensemble features reed players Chico Freeman and John Purcell, trumpeter Baikida Carroll, and bassist Rufus Reid.

== Reception ==
Professional ratings
Review scores
Source	Rating
AllMusic	4.5/5 stars
The Rolling Stone Jazz Record Guide	3/5 stars

The AllMusic review by Scott Yanow states that "this is a particularly strong outing by the 1982 edition of the group... it is not surprising that the music is adventurous yet quite coherent, with the solo and group statements being both spontaneous and logical. Recommended."

== Track listing ==
All compositions by Jack DeJohnette

1. "Starburst" - 9:11
2. "Ebony" - 8:42
3. "The Islands" - 8:36
4. "Inflation Blues" - 6:43
5. "Slowdown" - 6:24

== Personnel ==
Jack DeJohnette's Special Edition

- Baikida Carroll – trumpet (except "Ebony")
- Chico Freeman – tenor saxophone, soprano saxophone, bass clarinet
- John Purcell – baritone saxophone, alto saxophone, flute, clarinet
- Rufus Reid – bass
- Jack DeJohnette – drums, piano, clavinet, vocal
