= The Elephant Sleeps But Still Remembers =

Live album by Jack DeJohnette
- Released: February 8, 2006
- Recorded: October 31, 2001
- Venue: Earshot Jazz Festival, Seattle, WA.
- Genre: Jazz
- Length: 1:01:22
- Label: Golden Beam GBP-CD-1116
- Producer: Ben Surman

Jack DeJohnette chronology
Hybrids (2005)	The Elephant Sleeps But Still Remembers (2006)	Saudades (2006)

Professional ratings
Review scores
Source	Rating
All About Jazz	3/5 stars
AllMusic	4/5 stars
The Guardian	3/5 stars
PopMatters	7/10

The Elephant Sleeps But Still Remembers is a live album by American jazz musician Jack DeJohnette, recorded together with Bill Frisell.

== Personnel ==
- Jack DeJohnette – drums, percussion, vocals, piano, producer
- Bill Frisell – guitar, banjo
