= The DeJohnette Complex =

Studio album by Jack DeJohnette
- Released: 1969
- Recorded: December 26–27, 1968
- Genre: Avant-garde jazz
- Length: 39:13
- Label: Milestone
- Producers: Orrin Keepnews, Dick Katz

Jack DeJohnette chronology
The DeJohnette Complex (1969)	Have You Heard? (1970)

The DeJohnette Complex is the debut album by Jack DeJohnette, featuring Bennie Maupin, Stanley Cowell, Miroslav Vitous, Eddie Gómez, and Roy Haynes. It was recorded in 1968 and released on the Milestone label in 1969.

== Reception ==
Professional ratings
Review scores
Source	Rating
AllMusic	3.5/5 stars
Tom Hull	B
The Penguin Guide to Jazz Recordings	3/4 stars
The Rolling Stone Jazz Record Guide	2/5 stars

The AllMusic review by Scott Yanow states, "The music ranges from advanced swinging to brief free improvisations and some avant-funk... Intriguing and generally successful music". A JazzTimes reviewer selected it in 2012 as one of DeJohnette's key albums.

== Track listing ==
All compositions by Jack DeJohnette except as indicated

1. "Equipoise" (Stanley Cowell) - 3:58
2. "The Major General" - 6:34
3. "Miles' Mode" (John Coltrane) - 6:36
4. "Requiem Number 1" - 2:21
5. "Mirror Image" (Miroslav Vitous) - 5:08
6. "Papa, Daddy and Me" - 7:53
7. "Brown, Warm and Wintry" - 5:02
8. "Requiem Number 2" - 1:41

- Recorded at Dandon Productions, New York, on December 26 and 27, 1968

== Personnel ==
- Jack DeJohnette: drums (tracks 2, 5, 7), melodica (tracks 1, 3, 4, 6, 8)
- Bennie Maupin: tenor saxophone, wood flute, flute
- Stanley Cowell: electric piano, piano
- Miroslav Vitous: bass (tracks 1, 2, 4, 5, 8)
- Eddie Gómez: bass (tracks 3–8)
- Roy Haynes: drums (tracks 1, 3, 6, 8), percussion (track 4)
