= Hudson (album) =

Studio album by Jack DeJohnette, John Medeski, John Scofield, Larry Grenadier
- Released: June 9, 2017
- Recorded: January 2017
- Studio: NRS (Catskill, New York)
- Genre: Jazz
- Length: 71:54
- Label: Motéma
- Producers: Jack DeJohnette; John Medeski; John Scofield; Larry Grenadier

Jack DeJohnette chronology
Return (2017)	Hudson (2017)	Skyline (2021)

John Scofield chronology
Country for Old Men (2016)	Hudson (2017)	Combo 66 (2018)

Hudson is a jazz album by drummer Jack DeJohnette, bassist Larry Grenadier, keyboardist John Medeski and guitarist John Scofield. The album was released on June 9, 2017, by Motéma.

== Background ==
Hudson is the name of the quartet; it is inspired by the beauty and history of the Hudson River from which Woodstock is a few miles away. According to Jim Hynes of Elmore Magazine all four musicians are residents of the Hudson Valley. What is more, DeJohnette appeared on 1996 Michael Brecker's album Tales from the Hudson, "which has similar instrumentation except for Brecker’s sax".

The quartet initially played a concert together at the 2014 Woodstock Jazz Festival; that experience encouraged the band to pursue the project, culminating in the present record. Hudson is the band's debut, eponymous album consisting of not only originals by bandmembers but also new renditions of famous songs by such musicians as Bob Dylan, Joni Mitchell, The Band, and Jimi Hendrix, all of which are associated with the legend of Woodstock. Another relevant touchstone, unstated but clearly implied, is Miles Davis. The album also includes a new version of "Dirty Ground" (from DeJohnette's 2011 album Sound Travels) recorded there with lyrics and vocals by Bruce Hornsby. The album clearly celebrates the music from the late 1960s and early 1970s. Hudson was recorded directly to Pro Tools at 24-bit/96 kHz at Scott Petito's NRG Recording Studios, in Catskill, New York. Petito has been DeJohnette's recording engineer for some 20 years. With the release the musicians and the label are also celebrating Jack DeJonnette's 75th birthday.

== Reception ==
Professional ratings
Review scores
Source	Rating
All About Jazz	4.5/5 stars
AllMusic	3.5/5 stars
DownBeat	4/5 stars
Elmore	93/100
The Guardian	4/5 stars
Jazz Trail	B
Pitchfork	7.5/10
PopMatters	6/10
Stereophile	4.5/5 stars
The Times	4/5 stars

Paul de Barros of DownBeat wrote, "It would be easy to dismiss the supergroup Hudson as mere boomer nostalgia, but that would overlook just how vigorous, original, engaged and downright pleasurable this welcome debut sounds.... The band jumps deep into free territory on the title-track opener, an archeo-futuristic jam that spins raunchy, fuzzed guitar and skronky keyboard clanks around a throbbing, ceremonial beat". Seth Colter Walls of Pitchfork stated, "This is not the most fiery music DeJohnette has collaborated on, in his eighth decade. But the peaceable mastery that moves through Hudson does have the distinction of feeling comfortable without being too predictable". John Fordham in his review for The Guardian added, "The group's slightly clunky Native American chanting might have been better replaced by sampled field-recordings with instrumental decoration, but this is an elite jazz outfit collectively telling a compelling new story". Nate Chinen of JazzTimes commented "What they're creating is a top-to-bottom group improvisation—a jam, if we're being plainspoken about it—with the morphing shape of an amoeba. But over the course of a discursive and open-ended 23 minutes, a kind of structural integrity emerges, rooted in the loopy clarity of DeJohnette's groove". Writing for Elmore, Jim Hynes stated, "The album is a showcase for all four of them... Given the mostly electric fare, particularly on the rock numbers, it’s tempting to call this jazz fusion but it feels different. It’s lighter."

== Track listing ==
No.	Title	Writer(s)	Length
1.	"Hudson"	DeJohnette, Medeski, Scofield, Grenadier	10:56
2.	"El Swing"	Scofield	5:29
3.	"Lay Lady Lay"	Bob Dylan	8:16
4.	"Woodstock"	Joni Mitchell	6:00
5.	"A Hard Rain's A-Gonna Fall"	Bob Dylan	9:14
6.	"Wait Until Tomorrow"	Jimi Hendrix	5:29
7.	"Song for World Forgiveness"	DeJohnette	8:36
8.	"Dirty Ground"	Bruce Hornsby, DeJohnette	3:58
9.	"Tony Then Jack"	Scofield	5:03
10.	"Up on Cripple Creek"	Robbie Robertson	5:35
11.	"Great Spirit Peace Chant"	DeJohnette	3:16
Total length:			71:54

== Personnel ==
- John Medeski – acoustic piano, Rhodes electric piano, Hammond B3 organ, wooden flute, vocals
- John Scofield – guitars, wooden flute
- Larry Grenadier – double bass, vocals
- Jack DeJohnette – drums, tom tom, wooden flute, vocals

Production

- Jana Herzen – executive producer
- Dave Love – executive producer
- Hudson – producers
- Scott Petito – recording, mixing, mastering
- Beth Reineke – assistant engineer
- Robin Tomchin – project manager
- Rebecca Meek – package design
- Bill Douthart – photography
- Peter Occhiogrosso – liner notes
