= Oneness (Jack DeJohnette album) =

Studio album by Jack DeJohnette
- Released: 1997
- Recorded: January 1997
- Studio: Right Track, New York City
- Genre: Jazz
- Length: 63:20
- Label: ECM; ECM 1637
- Producer: Manfred Eicher

Jack DeJohnette chronology
Dancing with Nature Spirits (1996)	Oneness (1997)	Invisible Nature (2002)

Oneness is an album by Jack DeJohnette, recorded in January 1997 and released on ECM Records later that year. The quartet features bassist and guitarist Jerome Harris, percussionist Don Alias, and pianist Michael Cain.

== Reception ==
Professional ratings
Review scores
Source	Rating
AllMusic	4/5 stars
The Penguin Guide to Jazz Recordings	4/4 stars

The AllMusic review by Stephen Thomas Erlewine states, "Oneness stands as a welcome, minimalist and challenging effort from DeJohnette."

== Track listing ==
All compositions by Jack DeJohnette except where noted.

1. "Welcome Blessing" (Don Alias, Jack DeJohnette) – 2:05
2. "Free Above Sea" (Alias, Michael Cain, DeJohnette, Jerome Harris) – 5:54
3. "Priestesses of the Mist" – 15:13
4. "Jack In" – 12:36
5. "From the Heart/C.M.A." (Alias, Cain, DeJohnette, Harris) – 27:32

== Personnel ==
- Jack DeJohnette – drums, percussion
- Jerome Harris – bass guitar, guitar
- Don Alias – percussion
- Michael Cain – piano
