= New Directions (Jack DeJohnette album) =

Studio album by Jack DeJohnette
- Released: 1978
- Recorded: June 1978
- Studio: Talent, Oslo, Norway
- Genre: Jazz; avant-garde jazz; jazz fusion
- Length: 46:13
- Label: ECM 1128
- Producer: Manfred Eicher

Jack DeJohnette chronology
Gateway 2 (1978)	New Directions (1978)	Terje Rypdal / Miroslav Vitous / Jack DeJohnette (1978)

New Directions is an album by Jack DeJohnette, recorded in June 1978 and released on ECM later that year. The quartet features trumpeter Lester Bowie, guitarist John Abercrombie, and bassist Eddie Gomez.

== Reception ==
Professional ratings
Review scores
Source	Rating
AllMusic	3.5/5 stars
Christgau's Record Guide	B+
DownBeat	4.5/5 stars
Tom Hull	B+
The Penguin Guide to Jazz Recordings	3/4 stars
The Rolling Stone Jazz Record Guide	4/5 stars

In his DownBeat review, Michael Zipkin called the album a "deeply satisfying offering ... swing it does in its own rambling, yet razor sharp manner".

The AllMusic review by Scott Yanow noted that "the music is a bit dull, making too much use of space and featuring less of Bowie's trumpet and wit than one would hope... There are some strong moments (particularly from Abercrombie and DeJohnette) but this band (to use a cliché) was less than the sum of its parts."

== Track listing ==
All compositions by Jack DeJohnette except as indicated.

1. "Bayou Fever" – 8:40
2. "Where or Wayne" – 12:25
3. "Dream Stalker" (Abercrombie, Bowie, DeJohnette, Gomez) – 5:55
4. "One Handed Woman" (Abercrombie, Bowie, DeJohnette, Gomez) – 10:49
5. "Silver Hollow" – 8:24

== Personnel ==
- Jack DeJohnette – drums, piano
- John Abercrombie – guitar, electric mandolin
- Lester Bowie – trumpet
- Eddie Gómez – double bass

Production

- Manfred Eicher – producer
- Jan Erik Kongshaug – engineer
- Dieter Bonhorst – layout design
- Roberto Masotti – cover photo
