= Have You Heard? (Jack DeJohnette album) =

Live album by Jack DeJohnette
- Released: July 4, 1970
- Recorded: April 7, 1970
- Genre: Jazz
- Length: 60:07
- Label: Milestone

Jack DeJohnette chronology
The DeJohnette Complex (1969)	Have You Heard? (1970)	Take Off Your Body (1972)

Professional ratings
Review scores
Source	Rating
AllMusic	3/5 stars
The Rolling Stone Jazz Record Guide	3/5 stars

Have You Heard? is an album by Jack DeJohnette featuring Bennie Maupin, Gary Peacock and Hideo Ichikawa, recorded in Tokyo in April 1970 and released on the Milestone label.

== Track listing ==
All compositions by Jack DeJohnette except as indicated

1. "Neophilia (Love of the New) (Bennie Maupin) - 9:52
2. "Papa-Daddy" - 19:53
3. "Have You Heard?" - 21:26
4. "For Jane" - 7:56

- Recorded live at Toshi Center Hall, Akasaka, Tokyo, April 7, 1970

== Personnel ==
- Jack DeJohnette – drums, electric piano, voice
- Bennie Maupin – tenor saxophone, bass clarinet, flute
- Hideo Ichikawa – piano
- Gary Peacock – bass
