= Cosmic Chicken =

Studio album by Jack DeJohnette
- Released: 1975
- Recorded: April 24–26, 1975
- Studio: Fantasy, Berkeley, CA
- Genre: Jazz
- Label: Prestige
- Producer: Jack DeJohnette, Orrin Keepnews

Jack DeJohnette chronology
Sorcery (1974)	Cosmic Chicken (1975)	Gateway (1976)

Professional ratings
Review scores
Source	Rating
AllMusic	3/5 stars
The Rolling Stone Jazz Record Guide	4/5 stars

Cosmic Chicken is an album by Jack DeJohnette, featuring Alex Foster, John Abercrombie, and Peter Warren, recorded in 1975 and released on the Prestige label.

== Track listing ==
All compositions by Jack DeJohnette except where noted.

1. "Cosmic Chicken" – 4:53
2. "One for Devadip and the Professor" – 3:35
3. "Memories" – 5:58
4. "Stratocruiser" – 7:28
5. "Shades of the Phantom" – 6:13
6. "Eiderdown" (Steve Swallow) – 5:35
7. "Sweet and Pungent" – 3:32
8. "Last Chance Stomp" – 7:07

== Personnel ==
- Jack DeJohnette – drums, piano, keyboards
- Alex Foster – alto saxophone, tenor saxophone
- John Abercrombie – electric guitar
- Peter Warren – acoustic bass
