= Music from the Hearts of the Masters =

Studio album by Jack De Johnette and Foday Musa Suso
- Released: 2005
- Recorded: January 2002
- Studio: New York City
- Genre: Jazz, World music
- Length: 1:01:56
- Label: Golden Beams Productions; GBP1112

Jack De Johnette chronology
Invisible Nature (2002)	Music from the Hearts of the Masters (2005)	Music in the Key of Om (2005)

Music from the Hearts of the Masters is an album by American drummer Jack De Johnette and Gambian kora player Foday Musa Suso. It was recorded in January 2002 in New York City, and was released in 2005 by Golden Beams Productions.

== Reception ==
Professional ratings
Review scores
Source	Rating
All About Jazz	3.5/5 stars
All About Jazz	5/5 stars
AllMusic	3.5/5 stars
The Penguin Guide to Jazz	3/4 stars
PopMatters	5/10 stars

In a review for AllMusic, Michael G. Nastos wrote: "Suso and... DeJohnette team up in duets that do not juxtapose, but complement the rhythmic strengths of the different instruments, creating a language of their own... It is a consistent and playful dialogue between two incredible musicians who need no definitions, restrictions, or guidance to make their spare, soulful, diverse, and heartfelt original music happen."

John Kelman of All About Jazz stated: "while both artists look for a nexus point, neither is prepared to completely give up his own disposition, making Music from the Hearts of the Masters a unique experience. Suso's kora is so richly textured that it's hard not to be drawn in, while DeJohnette's groove-laden kit work creates an equally inviting space." AAJ's Franz A. Matzner commented: "A work of rare spiritual and musical clarity, Music from the Hearts of the Masters possesses a quiet strength which grounds Suso's often abstract, sometimes esoteric excursions to create a uniquely contemplative—almost meditative—experience."

Writing for PopMatters, Will Layman noted that the album "is essentially meditative and calming in tone. Unlike both jazz and European music, it does not tell a story with a set-up, development and a climax. Like a constantly moving spiral it draws us down to its essence rather than out to its conclusion." He concluded: "DeJohnette has more than earned the right to play with whomever and however he likes. It's great that he's getting to call his own shots."

== Track listing ==
1. "Ocean Wave" (DeJohnette/Suso) – 6:25
2. "Ancient Techno" (DeJohnette/Suso) – 6:32
3. "Rose Garden" (DeJohnette/Suso) – 5:10
4. "Worldwide Funk" (DeJohnette/Suso) – 6:45
5. "Kaira" (Traditional) – 6:45
6. "Mountain Love Dance" (DeJohnette/Suso) – 7:58
7. "Party" (DeJohnette/Suso) – 4:37
8. "Voice Of The Kudrus" (DeJohnette/Suso) – 9:31
9. "Sunjatta Keita" (Traditional) – 5:43
- The album also includes a short video documentary on the studio recording.

== Personnel ==
- Jack DeJohnette – drums
- Foday Musa Suso – kora
