= Album Album =

Studio album by Jack DeJohnette
- Released: 1984
- Recorded: June 1984
- Genre: Post bop, avant-garde jazz, free funk
- Length: 42:09
- Label: ECM
- Producer: Jack DeJohnette

Jack DeJohnette chronology
Inflation Blues (1983)	Album Album (1984)	The Jack DeJohnette Piano Album (1985)

Professional ratings
Review scores
Source	Rating
AllMusic	4.5/5 stars
The Penguin Guide to Jazz Recordings	3/4 stars
The Rolling Stone Jazz Record Guide	4/5 stars

Album Album is a 1984 jazz album by Jack DeJohnette’s Special Edition, featuring five compositions by DeJohnette and a cover of Thelonious Monk's "Monk's Mood". A JazzTimes reviewer selected it in 2012 as one of DeJohnette's key albums.

== Track listing ==
All compositions by Jack DeJohnette except where noted.

Side one

1. "Ahmad the Terrible" – 6:08
2. "Monk's Mood" (Thelonious Monk) – 7:41
3. "Festival" – 6:08

Side two

1. "New Orleans Strut" – 6:49
2. "Third World Anthem" – 10:51
3. "Zoot Suite" – 5:02

== Personnel ==
- Jack DeJohnette – synthesizer, guitar, drums, keyboards
- Howard Johnson – tuba, baritone saxophone
- David Murray – tenor saxophone
- John Purcell – alto saxophone and soprano saxophone
- Rufus Reid – bass guitar and double bass
- Dave Baker – recording engineer
