= Saudades (Trio Beyond album) =

2006 live album by Jack DeJohnette's Trio Beyond

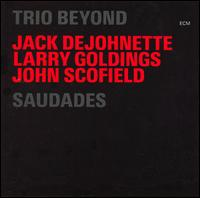

Live album by Trio Beyond
- Released: June 6, 2006
- Recorded: November 21, 2004
- Venues: Queen Elizabeth Hall (London, England)
- Genres: Jazz fusion; jazz funk; free funk
- Labels: ECM; ECM 1972/73

Jack DeJohnette chronology
The Elephant Sleeps But Still Remembers (2006)	Saudades (2006)	Peace Time (2007)

Saudades (Portuguese: "The Blues") is a live double-album by Jack DeJohnette's Trio Beyond, recorded at the Queen Elizabeth Hall in London, England, on November 21, 2004, and released on ECM June 2006, marking their debut recording. Saudade is a Portuguese word meaning sadness or longing for times past, or in a musical context, blues.

== Reception ==
Professional ratings
Review scores
Source	Rating
AllMusic	4.5/5 stars
The Penguin Guide to Jazz Recordings	3/4 stars

A JazzTimes reviewer selected Saudades in 2012 as one of DeJohnette's key albums, and wrote that it "might be his most incendiary showcase of sheer drumming prowess."

The AllMusic review by Thom Jurek stated: "Jack DeJohnette initiated a project to pay tribute to the late Tony Williams' Lifetime... The results on this double-disc album, Saudades, are explosive, dynamic, and utterly compelling... This is one of the finer moments in recent ECM history, and a fitting tribute to Williams and his contribution to a music that sharply divided "purists' (who still are a pain in the ass in trying to preserve jazz as a museum piece), and those more progressive thinking fans who were—and are still—looking for a music that could breathe, engage the culture, and continue to grow."

== Track listing ==
Disc one
No.	Title	Writer(s)	Length
1.	"If"	Joe Henderson	10:07
2.	"As One"	Larry Goldings	4:36
3.	"Allah Be Praised"	Larry Young	0:43
4.	"Saudades"	Jack DeJohnette; Larry Goldings; John Scofield	10:46
5.	"Pee Wee"	Tony Williams	12:13
6.	"Spectrum"	John McLaughlin	16:11

Disc two
No.	Title	Writer(s)	Length
1.	"Seven Steps to Heaven"	Miles Davis; Victor Feldman	12:54
2.	"I Fall in Love Too Easily"	Jule Styne; Sammy Cahn	10:13
3.	"Love in Blues"	DeJohnette; Goldings; Scofield	4:45
4.	"Big Nick"	John Coltrane	17:08
5.	"Emergency"	Tony Williams	11:19

== Personnel ==
Trio Beyond

- Jack DeJohnette – drums
- Larry Goldings – electric piano, Hammond B3 organ, sampler
- John Scofield – guitars

Production

- Patrick Murray – engineer
- Manfred Eicher – mixing, mastering
- Jan Erik Kongshaug – mixing, mastering
  - mixed and mastered at Rainbow Studio, Oslo, Norway
- Sascha Kleis – design
- Lydia DeJohnette – liner photography
- Roberto Masoti – liner photography
