= The Jack DeJohnette Piano Album =

Studio album by Jack DeJohnette
- Released: 1985
- Recorded: January 14–15, 1985
- Studio: Woodstock Recording Studio, Woodstock, New York
- Genre: Jazz
- Length: 43:41
- Label: Landmark; LLP-1504
- Producer: Orrin Keepnews, Jack DeJohnette

Jack DeJohnette chronology
| Album Album (1984) | The Jack DeJohnette Piano Album (1985) | In Our Style (1986) |

The Jack DeJohnette Piano Album is an album by Jack DeJohnette with Eddie Gómez and Freddie Waits recorded in 1985 and released on the Landmark label. This is DeJohnette's first album playing piano exclusively, rather than his more familiar drums.

== Reception ==
Professional ratings
Review scores
| Source | Rating |
|---|---|
| Allmusic | 4/5 stars |

The Allmusic review by Scott Yanow states "This album was a surprise when it was released for it features drummer Jack DeJohnette exclusively on piano and synthesizer in a trio... DeJohnette on a couple of the tunes was among the very first pianists to really capture the sound of Thelonious Monk. Other selections are more in his own style and he displays a strong technique that does not sound like the work of a drummer who is moonlighting... Worth checking out.".

== Track listing ==
All compositions by Jack DeJohnette except where noted

1. "Minority" (Gigi Gryce) - 8:32
2. "Lydia" - 3:46
3. "Countdown" (John Coltrane) - 2:38
4. "Spiral" (Coltrane) - 7:03
5. "Time After Time (Cyndi Lauper, Rob Hyman) - 4:00
6. "Milton" - 5:05
7. "Ahmad The Terrible" - 6:45
8. "Quiet Now" (Denny Zeitlin) - 5:52

== Personnel ==
- Jack DeJohnette - piano, synthesizer
- Eddie Gómez - bass (tracks 1–7)
- Freddie Waits - drums (tracks 1–7)
