= Music in the Key of Om =

Studio album by Jack DeJohnette
- Released: 2005
- Recorded: August 2003
- Studio: Magic Moments, New York
- Genre: ambient
- Length: 60:51
- Label: Golden Beams

Jack DeJohnette chronology
Music from the Hearts of the Masters (2005)	Music in the Key of Om (2005)	Hybrids (2005)

Music in the Key of Om is an album by Jack DeJohnette. It was recorded in 2003 and issued in 2005 by DeJohnette's Golden Beams Productions as the label's inaugural release. The album features DeJohnette on synthesizer, bells, and a new line of instruments developed in conjunction with the Sabian cymbal company, and consists of a single, hour-long track of ambient music intended for meditation and relaxation, a departure from DeJohnette's typical work in the jazz style.

In an interview, DeJohnette noted that the album came about as a result of working with his wife, Lydia, a "vibrational healer." He reflected: "these are stressful times, and I thought there was a need for some music for people to relax... People who did yoga and meditated and also just wanted to chill-out really liked the music. So I think that's a musical contribution that I can give, that gives me joy doing it, and helps people in their lives."

== Reception ==
Professional ratings
Review scores
Source	Rating
All About Jazz	3/5 stars
AllMusic	1/5 stars
The Penguin Guide to Jazz Recordings	1/4 stars

The album earned DeJohnette a nomination for "Best New Age Album" at the 48th Annual Grammy Awards.

The AllMusic review by Scott Yanow states, "One waits in vain for something — anything — interesting to occur, but it never does. To be fair, this is meant to be background music for one's deep thoughts. But after listening to this monotonous recital straight through, one will need a different form of "healing" music to recover from the mood that it casts! Even for new-age music, this is incredibly dull".

The authors of The Penguin Guide to Jazz Recordings wrote: "Intended as an aid to meditation, but more likely to prompt an anxiety attack."

John Kelman of All About Jazz commented: "People looking for more conventionally focused music will likely find Music in the Key of OM a disappointment; but for those who view music as a transporter and emotional healer, DeJohnette's record should be an album of significance and meaning."

Writing for PopMatters, Will Layman remarked: "It is both less and more than... New Age hoo-hah. It is dead-to-rights healing music. Breathe in. Breathe out. There you go."

The Sydney Morning Herald's John Shand wrote: "The weird part is that it works. The bells are deep-pitched and have extraordinary sustain. Something about their sound makes you sigh out the day's tension and unwind."

== Track listing ==
1. "Music in the Key of Om" (Jack DeJohnette) - 60:51

- Recorded at Magic Moments Studio, New York in August 2003

== Personnel ==
- Jack DeJohnette – synthesizer, percussion
