= Parallel Realities =

1990 studio album by Jack DeJohnette

Studio album by Jack DeJohnette
- Released: 1990
- Recorded: 1990
- Studio: Dreamland (Hurley, New York)
- Genre: Jazz, jazz fusion
- Length: 53:59
- Label: MCA
- Producer: Jack DeJohnette, Pat Metheny

Jack DeJohnette chronology
Audio-Visualscapes (1988)	Parallel Realities (1990)	Earthwalk (1991)

Professional ratings
Review scores
Source	Rating
Allmusic	3/5 stars

Parallel Realities is an album by drummer Jack DeJohnette with guitarist Pat Metheny and pianist Herbie Hancock recorded in 1990 and released on the MCA label. The AllMusic review by Ron Wynn states: "An overlooked session with Pat Metheny in definite jazz phase. Herbie Hancock shows his steadfast piano form."

== Track listing ==
All compositions by Jack DeJohnette except as indicated

Side one:
No.	Title	Length
1.	"Jack In"	6:23
2.	"Exotic Isles"	6:21
3.	"Dancing" (Pat Metheny)	7:40
4.	"Nine over Reggae" (Pat Metheny/Jack DeJohnette)	7:27

Side two:
No.	Title	Length
1.	"John McKee" (Pat Metheny)	8:12
2.	"Indigo Dreamscapes"	6:46
3.	"Parallel Realities" (Pat Metheny)	11:10

== Personnel ==
- Jack DeJohnette – drums, keyboard bass
- Pat Metheny – acoustic and electric guitar, synclavier, keyboards
- Herbie Hancock – piano, keyboards

== Note ==
- Recorded 1990 at Dreamland Recording Studios, West Hurley, NY
