= Audio-Visualscapes =

1988 album by Jack DeJohnette's Special Edition

Studio album by Jack DeJohnette
- Released: 1988
- Recorded: February 1–3, 1988
- Studio: Grog Kill, Woodstock, NY
- Genre: Jazz, jazz fusion
- Length: 74:05
- Label: MCA/Impulse!
- Producer: Jack DeJohnette

Jack DeJohnette chronology
Irresistible Forces (1987)	Audio-Visualscapes (1988)	Parallel Realities (1990)

Audio-Visualscapes is an album by Jack DeJohnette's Special Edition, featuring Greg Osby, Gary Thomas, Mick Goodrick, and Lonnie Plaxico, recorded in 1988 and released on the MCA/Impulse! label.

== Critical reception ==
Professional ratings
Review scores
Source	Rating
AllMusic	3/5 stars

The New York Times called the album "raw and tumultuous, hardly the work of someone settling into an easy middle age of refinement." The Boston Globe and The San Diego Union-Tribune considered it one of the best jazz albums of 1988.

The AllMusic review by Scott Yanow states: "This single-CD (formerly a double-LP) from Jack DeJohnette's Special Edition contains music that mixes together advanced hard bop, fusion, M-Base funk and avant-garde jazz... The results are sometimes unsettling but rarely dull, well worth several listens."

== Track listing ==
All compositions by Jack DeJohnette except as indicated

Side one

1. "PM's AM" - 5:50
2. "Donjo" (Greg Osby) - 6:20
3. "Master Mind" (Osby) - 8:07

Side two

1. "Slam Tango" - 6:06
2. "The Sphinx" (Ornette Coleman) - 15:22

Side three

1. "One for Eric" - 12:10
2. "Brown, Warm & Wintery" - 5:45

Side four

1. "Audio-Visualscapes" (DeJohnette, Lonnie Plaxico, Osby, Mick Goodrick, Gary Thomas) - 14:25

== Personnel ==
- Jack DeJohnette – drums, synthesizer (sampled grand piano, expander, drum machine)
- Gary Thomas – tenor saxophone, flute, bass clarinet (through voice processor and Vocoder)
- Greg Osby – alto saxophone, soprano saxophone (through Pitch Rider)
- Lonnie Plaxico – electric bass, upright bass
- Mick Goodrick – electric guitar
