= Lonnie Plaxico =

American jazz double bassist

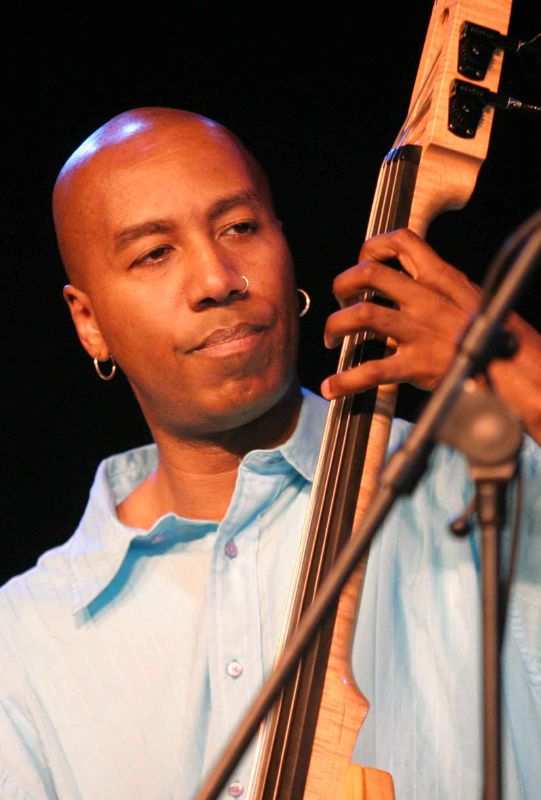

Background information
- Born: Lonnie Luvell Plaxico; September 4, 1960 (age 66); Chicago, U.S.
- Genres: Jazz
- Occupation: Musician
- Instrument: Double bass
- Years active: 1982–present
- Label: Muse
- Website: LonniePlaxico.com

Lonnie Plaxico (born September 4, 1960) is an American jazz double bassist.

== Biography ==
Plaxico was born in Chicago, into a musical family, and started playing the bass at the age of twelve, turning professional at fourteen (playing both double bass and bass guitar). His first recording was with his family's band, and by the time he was twenty he had moved to New York City, where he had stints playing with Chet Baker, Dexter Gordon, Sonny Stitt, Junior Cook, and Hank Jones. He won the Louis Armstrong Jazz Award in 1978.

Plaxico first came to public attention through his work with the Wynton Marsalis group in 1982, though his first regular attachment was with Art Blakey's Jazz Messengers (1983–86), with whom he recorded twelve albums.

In the mid-1980s Plaxico joined the M-Base collective and played on the debut-releases of Steve Coleman (Motherland Pulse, 1985), Cassandra Wilson (Point of View, 1986) and Greg Osby (Sound Theatre, 1987). On Wilson's recordings he appeared regularly ever since and is the musical director and first bassist of her tour band for more than 15 years.

In 1986 Jack DeJohnette reformed his Special Edition and engaged beside guitarist Mick Goodrick the M-Base saxophonists Greg Osby and Gary Thomas and Plaxico on bass. The band existed until 1993, after three albums with pianist Michael Cain replacing Goodrick on the last.

Plaxico has also performed and recorded with a wide range of artists, including Dizzy Gillespie, David Murray, Alice Coltrane, Stanley Turrentine, Andrew Hill, Joe Sample, Abbey Lincoln, Bill Cosby, Lonnie Liston Smith, Ravi Coltrane, Scott Tixier, Barbara Dennerlein, Helen Sung and Nina Vidal.

== Discography ==
=== As leader ===
- 1989: Plaxico (Muse)
- 1990: Iridescence (Muse)
- 1992: Short Takes (Muse)
- 1993: With All Your Heart (Muse)
- 2000: Emergence (Savant)
- 2001: Mélange (Blue Note)
- 2002: Live at the 5:01 Jazz Bar (Orchard, Plaxmusic)
- 2003: Rhythm and Soul (Sirocco Jazz)
- 2004: Live at Jazz Standard (Village, Japan)
- 2006: So Alive (Eighty-Eight's)
- 2006: West Side Stories (Plaxmusic)
- 2007: Live at the Zinc Bar NYC (Plaxmusic)
- 2009: Ancestral Devotion (Plaxmusic)

=== As sideman ===
With Art Blakey and the Jazz Messengers

- Aurex Jazz Festival (Eastworld, 1983)
- New York Scene (Concord, 1984)
- Blue Night (Timeless, 1985)
- Live at Sweet Basil (Paddle Wheel, 1985)
- Live at Kimball's (Concord, 1985)
- Live at Ronnie Scott's (Wadham, 1985)
- Hard Champion (Paddle Wheel, 1985)
- Farewell (Paddle Wheel, 1985)
- New Year's Eve at Sweet Basil (King/ProJazz, 1985)
- Dr. Jeckyle - Live at Sweet Basil Vol. 2 (ProJazz, 1985)

With Cecil Brooks III

- The Collective (Muse, 1989)
- Smokin' Jazz (Muse, 1996)

With Steve Coleman

- Motherland Pulse (JMT, 1985)
- Five Elements, Sine Die (Pangaea, 1988)

With Cassandra Wilson

- Point of View (JMT, 1986)
- Blue Skies (JMT, 1988)
- Jumpworld (JMT, 1990)
- Blue Light 'til Dawn (Blue Note, 1993)
- New Moon Daughter (Blue Note, 1995)
- Rendezvous (Blue Note, 1997) also with Jacky Terrasson
- Traveling Miles (Blue Note, 1999)
- Loverly (Blue Note, 2008)
- Coming Forth by Day (Legacy, 2015)
- 5 Original Albums (Blute Note, 2018)

With Greg Osby

- Greg Osby and Sound Theatre (JMT, 1987)
- Mindgames (JMT, 1988)
- Season of Renewal (JMT, 1990)
- Zero (Blue Note, 1998)

With Jack DeJohnette's Special Edition

- Irresistible Forces (Impulse!/MCA, 1987)
- Audio-Visualscapes (Impulse!/MCA, 1988)
- Earthwalk (Blue Note, 1991)

With Ron Jackson

- A Guitar Thing You (Muse, 1991)
- Thinking of You (Muse, 1993)

With Don Byron

- Tuskegee Experiments (Nonesuch, 1992)
- Ivey-Divey (Blue Note, 2004)

With others

- Cindy Blackman, Code Red (Muse, 1992) – rec. 1990
- Ravi Coltrane, Moving Pictures (RCA/BMG, 1998)
- Robin Eubanks, Karma (JMT, 1991)
- Dizzy Gillespie, New Faces (GRP, 1985)
- Bunky Green, Another Place (Label Bleu, 2006) – rec. 2004
- Bud Shank, I Told You So (Candid, 1992)
- Carola Grey, Noisy Mama (Jazzline, 1992)
- Lafayette Harris, Lafayette Is Here (Muse, 1993)
- Hannibal Marvin Peterson, One with the Wind (Muse, 1993)
- Gust Tsilis, Wood Music (Enja, 1993)
- Regina Carter, Regina Carter (Atlantic, 1995)
- Talib Kibwe, Introducing Talib Kibwe (Evidence, 1996)
- Barbara Dennerlein, Take Off! (Verve, 1995)
- Jean-Paul Bourelly, Harry Sokal, and Ronnie Burrage, Mag Five (PAO, 1998)
- LaMont Johnson, 241 East 3rd St. (Orchard, 1998)
- Ray Anderson, Lapis Lazuli Band, Funkorific (Enja, 1998)
- Mark Ledford, Miles to Go (Verve Forecast, 1998)
- Jason Moran, Soundtrack to Human Motion (Blue Note, 1999)
- Teri Thornton, I'll Be Easy to Find (Verve, 1999)
- Bunky Green, Another Place (Label Bleu, 2006)
- Brian Landrus, Traverse (BlueLand, 2012)
- Yukiko Onishi aka Yucco Miller, Yucco Miller (King, 2016)
