= Jack DeJohnette =

American jazz drummer, pianist and composer (1942–2025)

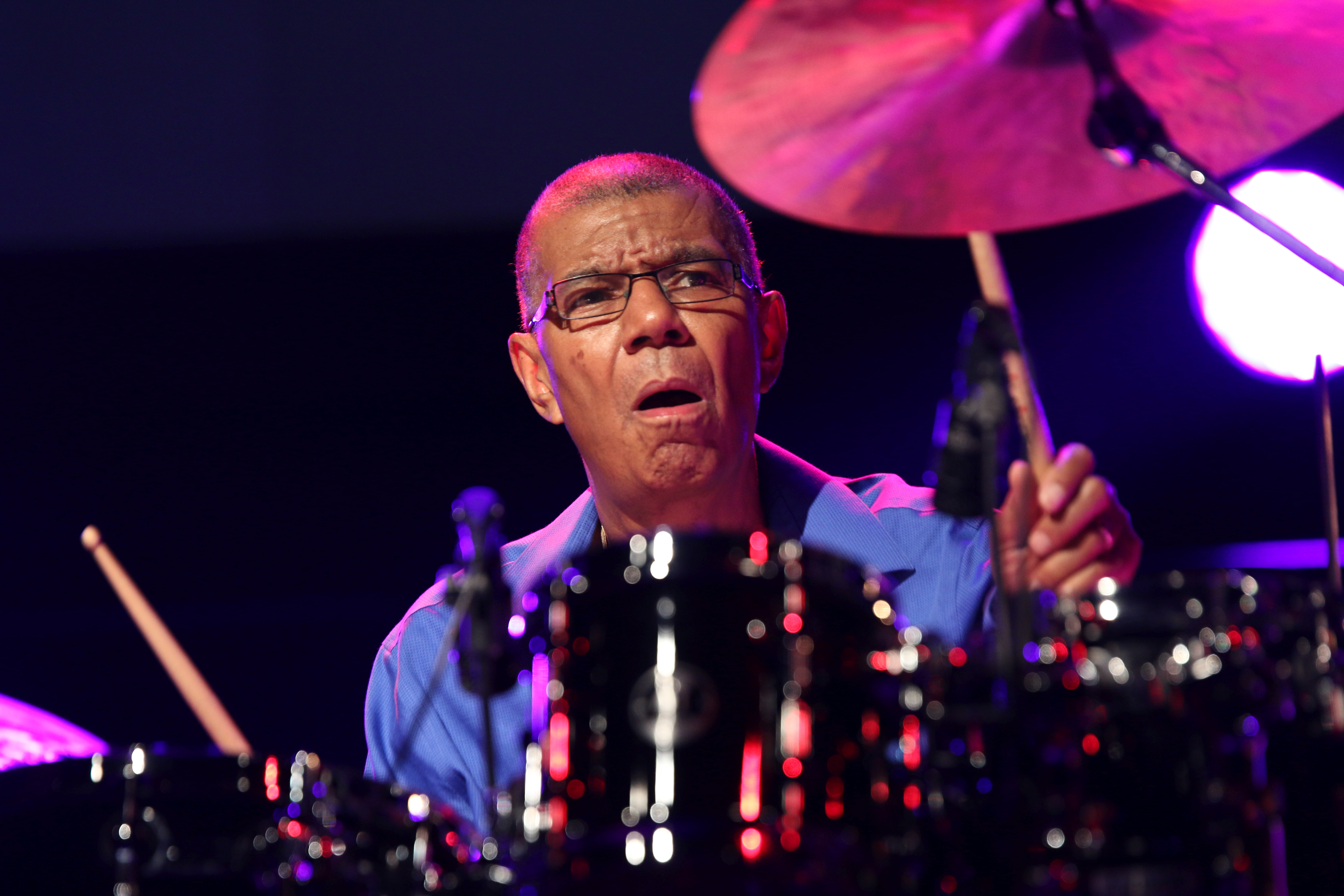
- DeJohnette in 2015

Background information
- Born: August 9, 1942; Chicago, Illinois, US
- Died: October 26, 2025 (aged 83) Kingston, New York, US
- Education: Chicago Conservatory of Music
- Genres: Jazz; jazz fusion; new-age
- Occupations: Musician; composer
- Instruments: Drums; percussion; piano; melodica
- Years active: 1961–2025
- Labels: Milestone; Prestige; ECM; MCA; Blue Note; Columbia
- Website: www.jackdejohnette.com

Signature
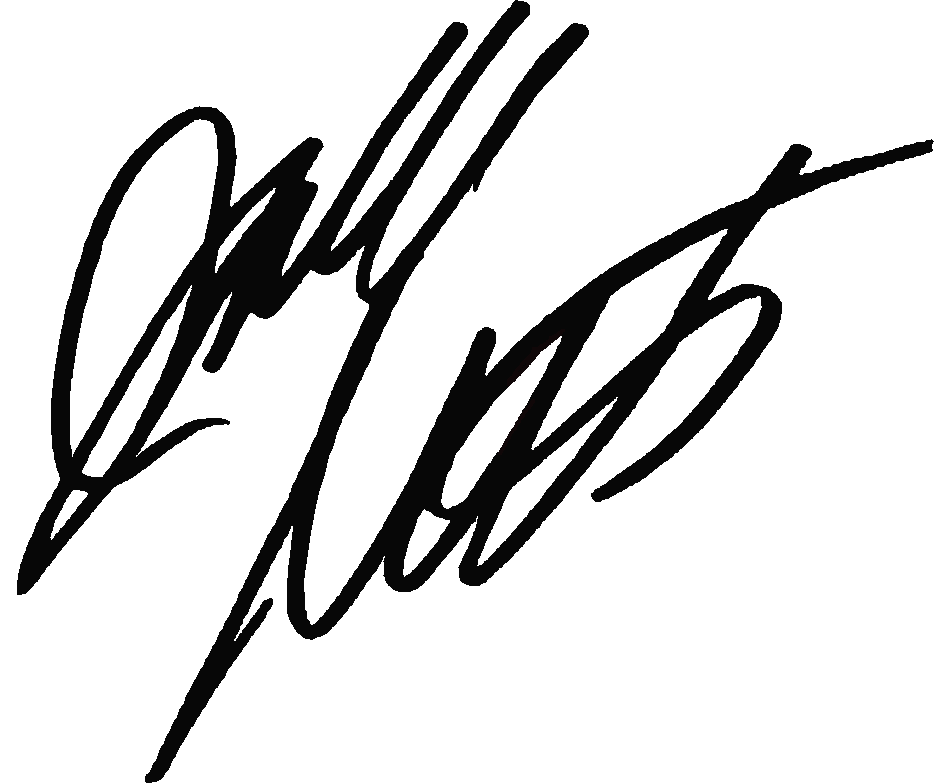

Jack DeJohnette (August 9, 1942 – October 26, 2025) was an American jazz drummer, pianist and composer. Known for his extensive work as leader and sideman for musicians including Charles Lloyd, Freddie Hubbard, Keith Jarrett, Bill Evans, John Abercrombie, Ralph Towner, Alice Coltrane, Sonny Rollins, Miles Davis, Joe Henderson, Michael Brecker, Pat Metheny, Herbie Hancock, and John Scofield, DeJohnette was inducted into the Modern Drummer Hall of Fame in 2007. He won two Grammy Awards and was nominated for six others. The Times said that as a drummer "few could rival his virtuosity or his dynamism". He recorded more than 35 albums under his own name as a band leader.

== Life and career ==
=== Early life and musical beginnings ===
DeJohnette was born in Chicago, Illinois, on August 9, 1942, to Jack DeJohnette (1911–2011), a labourer, and Eva Jeanette DeJohnette (née Wood, 1918–1984). Although of predominantly African-American heritage, DeJohnette stated that he had some Native American ancestry, specifically Seminole and Crow. His parents moved to California to find work and he was raised by his grandmother Rosalie Ann Wood. His childhood was spent in a musical environment and his mother, who returned to Chicago without his father, was said to have composed the jazz standard 'Stormy Monday' and sold it for 50 dollars.

He was found to have perfect pitch and began his musical career as a pianist, studying from the age of four with Antoinette Rich, the leader of an all-female symphony orchestra in Chicago, and first playing professionally when he was 14 years old. At school he sang lead tenor in a doo-wop quartet and played acoustic bass in a dance band. When Jack was 13 he switched to drums, although he still saw piano as his first instrument and played in the clubs of Chicago. He was taught drumming techniques by a local jazz drummer, Bobby Miller Jr, who lived in the same neighborhood, and practised three hours on drums and three hours on piano each day. DeJohnette credited his uncle, Roy Wood Sr. (1915–1995), a Chicago jazz disc jockey and vice president/co-founder of the National Black Network, as his inspiration to play music, introducing him to jazz and taking him to clubs.

DeJohnette played R&B, hard bop, and avant-garde music in Chicago. He led his own groups in addition to playing with Richard Abrams, Roscoe Mitchell and other eventual core members of the Association for the Advancement of Creative Musicians (founded in 1965). DeJohnette also occasionally played drums for the Sun Ra Arkestra, and later in New York. He graduated from Chicago Vocational School in 1961, by which time he was well-known in the city's jazz clubs. One night when John Coltrane and his quintet were playing a residency at a club, Elvin Jones was late back for the final set and DeJohnette sat in for three numbers to cover for him.

In 1966, DeJohnette moved to New York City, where he became a member of the Charles Lloyd Quartet, a band that recognized the influence of rock and roll on jazz. In Lloyd's group DeJohnette first encountered pianist Keith Jarrett, who would work extensively with him throughout his career. He collaborated with Jarrett for almost 40 years.

DeJohnette left the group in early 1968, citing Lloyd's deteriorating "flat" playing as his reason for leaving. Lloyd's band was where DeJohnette received international recognition for the first time, but during his early years in New York he also worked with other groups, including Jackie McLean, Abbey Lincoln, Betty Carter, and Bill Evans. He joined Evans' trio in 1968, the same year the group headlined the Montreux Jazz Festival and produced the album Bill Evans at the Montreux Jazz Festival. In November 1968, DeJohnette worked briefly with Stan Getz and his quartet, which led to his first recordings with Miles Davis.

=== The Miles Davis years ===
In 1969, DeJohnette left the Evans trio and replaced Tony Williams in Miles Davis's live band. Davis had seen DeJohnette play many times, once during a stint with Evans at Ronnie Scott's Jazz Club in London in 1968, where he also first heard bassist Dave Holland, and Davis recognized DeJohnette's ability to combine the driving grooves associated with rock and roll with improvisational aspects associated with jazz.

DeJohnette was the primary drummer on the album Bitches Brew, recorded in 1969 and released the following year. DeJohnette and the other musicians saw the Bitches Brew sessions as unstructured and fragmentary, but also innovative. "As the music was being played, as it was developing, Miles would get new ideas ... He'd do a take, and stop, and then get an idea from what had just gone on before, and elaborate on it ... The recording of Bitches Brew was a stream of creative musical energy. One thing was flowing into the next, and we were stopping and starting all the time." DeJohnette was not the only drummer involved in the project, as Davis had also enlisted Billy Cobham, Don Alias, and Lenny White, but he was considered to be the leader of the rhythm section. He played on the live albums that followed the release of Bitches Brew, assembled from recordings of concerts at the Fillmore East in New York and Fillmore West in San Francisco. These ventures were undertaken at the suggestion of Clive Davis, then president of Columbia Records.

DeJohnette continued to work with Davis for the next three years, which led to collaborations with Davis band members John McLaughlin, Chick Corea, and Holland. DeJohnette also drew Keith Jarrett into the band. He contributed to Davis albums such as Live-Evil (1971), Jack Johnson (1971), and On the Corner (1972), and in sessions later released on the 1981 compilation album Directions. DeJohnette left the Davis group in mid-1971, although he returned for several concerts through the rest of the year. The Times said the recordings he had made with Miles Davis "helped to change the direction of modern jazz and launched a new style of funk-inflected jazz-rock."

=== Solo and bandleader in the 1970s and 1980s ===
DeJohnette's first record as leader, heading a sextet, The DeJohnette Complex, was released in 1968; on the album, he played melodica as well as drums, often allowing his mentor, Roy Haynes, to sit behind the set. DeJohnette also recorded, in the early 1970s, the albums Have You Heard, Sorcery, and Cosmic Chicken. He released these first four albums on either the Milestone or Prestige labels, and then switched to ECM for his next endeavors; ECM gave him a "fertile platform" for his "atmospheric drumming and challenging compositions". He was also featured on First Light, an album by trumpeter Freddie Hubbard, released by CTI in 1971.

The musical freedom he had while recording for ECM offered DeJohnette many dates as a sideman and opportunities to start his own groups. He formed the group Compost in 1972, but this was a short-lived endeavor, and DeJohnette cited the music as being far too experimental to achieve commercial success. During this period, he continued his career as a sideman as well, rejoining Stan Getz's quartet from 1973 to October 1974, and also enticing Dave Holland to join Getz's rhythm section. This stint briefly preceded the formation of the Gateway Trio, a group that DeJohnette helped form but did not lead. This group came directly out of DeJohnette's time with Getz, as Holland joined him in this group along with guitarist John Abercrombie, both of whom would become associated with DeJohnette throughout his career. His next group effort was Directions, a group formed in 1976 featuring saxophonist Alex Foster, bassist Mike Richmond, and Abercrombie, showing the links between the members of the Gateway trio. This was another short-lived group, yet it led directly to the formation of DeJohnette's next group, New Directions, which featured Abercrombie again on guitar along with Lester Bowie on trumpet and Eddie Gómez on bass. This group coexisted with another DeJohnette group, Special Edition, which was the first DeJohnette-led group to receive critical acclaim. This group also helped the careers of many lesser-known young horn players, as it had a rotating front line that included David Murray, Arthur Blythe, Chico Freeman, and John Purcell, among others. DeJohnette recorded more than 35 albums under his own name as a band leader with musicians including Jarrett, Herbie Hancock, Bill Frisell, Pat Metheny and Ravi Coltrane.

During this period, especially with Special Edition, DeJohnette offered "the necessary gravity to keep the horns in a tight orbit" in his compositions while also treating his listeners to "the expanded vocabulary of the avant-garde plus the discipline of traditional jazz compositions." DeJohnette's work with Special Edition was interrupted regularly by other projects, the most significant of which were his recordings in 1983 and tours from 1985 as a member of Keith Jarrett's trio, which was totally devoted to playing jazz standards. The trio included his long-time compatriot Jarrett and bassist Gary Peacock, and all three were members of the group for over 25 years.

At the start of the 1980s, DeJohnette played on the album 80/81 with Pat Metheny, Charlie Haden, Dewey Redman and Michael Brecker. In 1981, DeJohnette performed at the Woodstock Jazz Festival, held in celebration of the 10th anniversary of the Creative Music Studio.

=== 1990s onwards ===
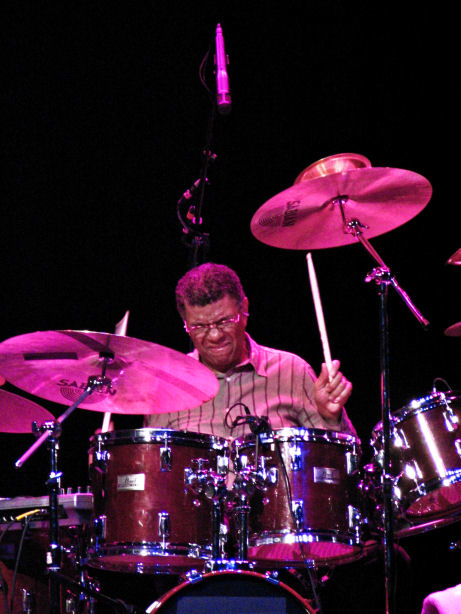
DeJohnette in 2006

DeJohnette continued to work with Special Edition into the 1990s, but did not limit himself to that. In 1990, he toured in a quartet consisting of himself, Herbie Hancock, Pat Metheny, and his long-time collaborator Holland, and released Parallel Realities with this group the same year. In 1992, he released a major collaborative record, Music for the Fifth World, which was inspired by studies with a Native American elder and brought him together musically with players like Vernon Reid and John Scofield. He had also, during the 1980s, resumed playing piano, which led to his 1994 tour as an unaccompanied pianist. He also began working again with Abercrombie and Holland, reviving the Gateway trio. In 1990, DeJohnette was awarded an Honorary Doctorate of Music from Berklee College of Music.

In 2004, he was nominated for a Grammy award for his work on Keith Jarrett's live album The Out-of-Towners, and continued to work with that group into 2005. In the next few years, DeJohnette would begin and lead three new projects, the first of which was the Latin Project, consisting of percussionists Giovanni Hidalgo and Luisito Quintero, reedman Don Byron, pianist Edsel Gomez, and bassist Jerome Harris. The other two new projects were the Jack DeJohnette Quartet, featuring Harris again alongside Danilo Perez and John Patitucci, and the Trio Beyond, a tribute to DeJohnette's friend Tony Williams and his trio Lifetime (consisting of Williams, Larry Young and John McLaughlin), featuring John Scofield and Larry Goldings. DeJohnette also founded his own label, Golden Beams Productions, in 2005. That same year, he released Music in the Key of Om on his new label, an electronic album that he created for relaxing and meditative purposes, on which he played synthesizer and resonating bells, and which was nominated for a Grammy Award in the Best New Age Album category.

DeJohnette continued to make albums as a leader and sideman throughout this period as well, one of which was The Elephant Sleeps But Still Remembers, a collaboration that documents the first meeting of DeJohnette and guitarist Bill Frisell in 2001 and led to another tour, with Frisell and Jerome Harris. The next year Trio Beyond released Saudades, a live recording of a concert commemorating Tony Williams in London in 2004. In 2008, DeJohnette toured with Bobby McFerrin, Chick Corea, and the Jarrett trio, and the next year won the Grammy Award for Best New Age Album with Peace Time. In 2010, he founded the Jack DeJohnette Group, featuring Rudresh Mahanthappa on alto saxophone, David Fiuczynski on double-neck guitar, George Colligan on keyboards and piano, and long-time associate Jerome Harris on electric and acoustic bass guitars.

In 2012, DeJohnette released the album Sound Travels, which included appearances by McFerrin, Quintero, Bruce Hornsby, Esperanza Spalding, Lionel Loueke, and Jason Moran. The same year, he was awarded an NEA Jazz Masters Fellowship for his "significant lifetime contributions [which] have helped to enrich jazz and further the growth of the art form." In 2016 he released a solo piano album titled 'Return'.

== Style ==
DeJohnette's style, incorporating elements of jazz, free jazz, world music, and R&B, made him one of the most highly regarded and in-demand drummers. Initially a traditional grip player, he later switched to matched grip because of a problem with tendinitis.

His drumming style has been called unique. One critic wrote that he was not merely a drummer but a "percussionist, colourist and epigrammatic commentator mediating the shifting ensemble densities" and that his drumming was "always part of the music's internal construction." In a 2004 interview with DeJohnette, Modern Drummer magazine characterised his drumming as being "beyond technique". The Times said that "few could rival his virtuosity or his dynamism".

DeJohnette called himself an "abstract thinker" when it came to soloing, saying that he put "more weight on the abstract than, 'What were you thinking in bar 33?' I don't like to think that way. I can do it, but I like to be more in the flow." He said that when he was playing, he went "into an altered state, a different headspace. I plug into my higher self, into the cosmic library of ideas." He remarked that he had to use a lot of restraint when playing in Keith Jarrett's trio, in order "to play with the subtlety that the music requires."

While DeJohnette was best known and was mostly active as a drummer, he was also a schooled pianist. He began studying piano at the age of four and later took piano lessons at the Chicago Conservatory of Music, and he played both as a pianist and as a drummer in his early career. Later he returned to the piano, releasing solo piano albums in 1985 (The Jack DeJohnette Piano Album) and 2016 (Return). He also played piano, organ and synthesizer keyboard instruments on albums on which he played as a drummer, such as Pictures (1977) and New Directions In Europe (live in concert in 1979, released 1980).

DeJohnette cited Max Roach, Art Blakey, Roy Haynes, Elvin Jones, Philly Joe Jones, Art Taylor, Rashied Ali, Paul Motian, Tony Williams, and Andrew Cyrille as influences on his drumming. Nevertheless he did not appreciate being pigeonholed as a drummer, unhesitatingly stating when interviewed in 2000 that he was "a complete musician."

== Private life and death ==
An early marriage to Deatra Davenport ended in divorce. DeJohnette married secondly Lydia Herman, his wife of 57 years, who acted as his manager. They had two daughters.

DeJohnette died of congestive heart failure in Kingston, New York, on October 26, 2025, at the age of 83.

== Discography ==
- The DeJohnette Complex (Milestone, 1968 [1969]), OCLC 695471526
- Have You Heard (Milestone, 1970), OCLC 899986713
- Jackeyboard (Trio, 1973), OCLC 1264878857
- Time & Space (Trio, 1973), OCLC 900004803
- Sorcery (Prestige, 1974), OCLC 1397013325
- Cosmic Chicken (Prestige, 1975), OCLC 994876148
- Untitled (ECM, 1976), OCLC 5624122
- Pictures (ECM, 1976 [1977]), OCLC 1401614594
- New Rags (ECM, 1977), OCLC 5996399
- New Directions (ECM, 1978), OCLC 1139878802
- Special Edition (ECM, 1979 [1980]), OCLC 781402519
- New Directions in Europe (ECM, 1979 [1980]), OCLC 1183498649
- Tin Can Alley (ECM, 1980 [1981]), OCLC 658890878
- Inflation Blues (ECM, 1982 [1983]), OCLC 724821396
- Album Album (ECM, 1984), OCLC 611505424
- The Jack DeJohnette Piano Album (Landmark, 1985), OCLC 416584656
- Zebra (MCA, 1989), OCLC 1397320182
- In Our Style (DIW, 1986), OCLC 658379989
- Irresistible Forces (MCA/Impulse!, 1987), OCLC 868332820
- Audio-Visualscapes (MCA/Impulse!, 1988), OCLC 25345840
- Parallel Realities (MCA, 1990), OCLC 780947178
- Earthwalk (Blue Note, 1991), OCLC 25764546
- Music for the Fifth World (Manhattan, 1992), OCLC 872153658
- Extra Special Edition (Blue Note, 1994), OCLC 1102125798
- Dancing with Nature Spirits (ECM, 1995), OCLC 1112954133
- Oneness (ECM, 1997), OCLC 931313308
- The Elephant Sleeps But Still Remembers (Golden Beams, 2001), with Bill Frisell, OCLC 873591541
- Music from the Hearts of the Masters (Golden Beams, 2005), OCLC 421832059
- Music in the Key of Om (Golden Beams, 2005), OCLC 1450758036
- Hybrids (Golden Beams, 2005), The Ripple Effect, OCLC 718104283
- Saudades (ECM, 2006), Trio Beyond, OCLC 717311647
- Peace Time (Golden Beams, 2006 [2007]), OCLC 871489760
- Music We Are (Golden Beams, 2009), OCLC 939200089
- Sound Travels (eOne/Golden Beams, 2012), OCLC 939748170
- Made in Chicago (ECM, 2013 [2015]), with Muhal Richard Abrams, Larry Gray, Roscoe Mitchell, Henry Threadgill, OCLC 1246184187
- In Movement (ECM, 2016), OCLC 953880493
- Hudson (Motema, 2017), OCLC 986498160

== As a guest ==
- If on a Winter's Night... – Sting (2009) – drums on one song "The Burning Babe", OCLC 762597394

== Awards ==
- Fellow of United States Artists (2012)
- NEA Jazz Master (2012)
- Grammy Award for Best Jazz Instrumental Album, Skyline, 64th Annual GRAMMY Awards
- Grammy Award for Best New Age Album, Peace Time, 51st Annual Grammy Awards
- Six additional Grammy Award nominations
