= Dave Liebman discography =

This is the discography for American jazz musician Dave Liebman.

== Discography ==
=== As leader ===
- 1970: Night Scapes with Carvel Six (CBS/Sony, 1975)
- 1973: First Visit (Philips, 1973)
- 1974: Lookout Farm (ECM, 1974)
- 1974: Drum Ode (ECM, 1975)
- 1975: Sweet Hands (Horizon, 1975)
- 1976: Light'n Up, Please! (Horizon, 1977)
- 1976-1977: The Last Call (EGO, 1979)
- 1978: Pendulum (Artists House, 1979) – live
- 1978?: 8 Originals from the Seventies (JA, 1979) – education primer not playing
- 1979: The Opal Heart featuring Mike Nock (44, 1979)
- 1979: Dedications (CMP, 1980)
- 1979: "Lieb": Close-Up (Contempo Vibrato, 1983)
- 1979: What It Is (CBS/Sony, 1980)
- 1980: If They Only Knew (Timeless, 1981)
- 1981-1982: Solo: Memories, Dreams and Reflections (PM, 1983)
- 1982: Spirit Renewed with Bob Moses, Eddie Gómez (Owl, 1991)
- 1984: Picture Show (PM, 1985)
- 1985: Guided Dream with the Tolvan Big Band (Dragon, 1986)
- 1985: The Loneliness of a Long Distance Runner (CMP, 1986)
- 1987?: Homage to John Coltrane (Owl, 1987)
- 1988: David Liebman Trio + One (Owl, 1988)
- 1989: Time Line (Owl, 1990)
- 1989: The Blessing of The Old, Long Sound (Innowo, 1990)
- 1990-1991: Classic Ballads (Candid, 1991)
- 1992?: Looking For The Light (A Tribute To Chet Baker) (CCB, 1992)
- 1992: Joy: The Music of John Coltrane (Candid, 1993)
- 1995: Voyage (Evidence, 1996)
- 1995: John Coltrane's Meditations (Arkadia Jazz, 1997)
- 1995: Live at MCG (MCG, 2009) – live
- 1996?: Return of the Tenor: Standards (Double-Time, 1996)
- 1996: New Vista (Arkadia Jazz, 1997)
- 1997?: The Elements: Water with Billy Hart, Cecil McBee & Pat Metheny (Arkadia Jazz, 1997)
- 1999?: Monk's Mood (Double-Time 1999)
- 2001: In a Mellow Tone (Zoho, 2004)
- 2001?: The Unknown Jobim (Global Music Network, 2001)
- 2001?: Liebman Plays Puccini: A Walk in the Clouds (Arkadia Jazz, 2001)
- 2003?: Conversation (Sunnyside, 2003)
- 2003?: Beyond the Line (OmniTone, 2003)
- 2003: Lieb Plays Wilder (Daybreak, 2005)
- 2004: The Distance Runner (hatOLOGY, 2005) – live at Jazzfestival Willisau
- 2006?: Back on the Corner (Tone Center, 2006)
- 2005, 2007: Live, As Always (Mama, 2010) – live compilation
- 2007?: Blues All Ways (OmniTone, 2007)
- 2008?: Further Conversations (True Azul, 2008)
- 2008?: Negative Space (EmArcy, 2008)
- 2008: Lieb Plays Weill with Jesse Van Ruller (Daybreak, 2009)
- 2013?: Lieb Plays The Beatles (Daybreak, 2013)
- 2013: Ceremony (Chesky, 2014)
- 2013: Samsara (Whaling City Sound, 2014)
- 2015: The Puzzle (Whaling City Sound, 2015)
- 2014-16: Expansions Live (Whaling City Sound, 2016)[2CD] – live compilation
- 2016: Fire (Jazzline, 2018)
- 2018?: To My Masters (Vaju, 2018)[CDR]

=== As co-leader ===
- 1975: Father Time with Frank Tusa et al. (Enja, 1975)
- 1975: Forgotten Fantasies with Richie Beirach (Horizon/A&M, 1976)
- 1978: Mosaic Select: Pendulum - Live At The Village Vanguard with Randy et al. (Mosaic, 2008)[3CD] – live
- 1978: Omerta with Richie Beirach (Trio, 1978)
- 1982: Earth Jones with Elvin Jones (Palo Alto, 1982)
- 1985: Double Edge with Richie Beirach (Storyville, 1987)
- 1985: The Duo: Live with Richie Beirach (Advance music, 1991) – live
- 1988?: The Energy of the Chance with Dave Love (Heads Up, 1988)
- 1998: Suite for Soprano Sax and String Orchestra with Florian Ross (Naxos, 1999)
- 2001: Cosmos with Abbey Rader (Cadence, 2003) – live
- 2004: Manhattan Dialogues with Phil Markowitz (Zoho, 2005)
- 2004: Duologue with Mike Nock (Birdland, 2007) – live
- 2004: Different But The Same with Ellery Eskelin, Tony Marino, Jim Black (hatOLOGY, 2005)
- 2005: Flashpoint with Anthony Jackson, Steve Smith, Aydin Esen (Mascot, 2005)
- 2006: Waters Ashore with Misha Feigin, LaDonna Smith (Trans Museq, 2006)
- 2009: Quest for Freedom with Richie Beirach (Sunnyside, 2010) – live
- 2010: Live at Nozart with Robert Landfermann, Pablo Held, Christian Lillinger (Klaeng, 2019) – live
- 2011: Sketches of Aranjuez with Saudades Jazz Orchestra (PAO, 2015)
- 2011: The Fallout of Dreams with Steve Dalachinsky (Rogueart, 2014)
- 2012: Blue Rose with John Stowell (Origin, 2014)
- 2012: Sound Desire with Romano Pratesi (Dodicilune, 2019)
- 2013?: Lineage with Michael Stephans (Whaling City Sound, 2013)
- 2012, 14: Media Luz with Jean-Marie Machado, Claus Stötter, Quatuor Psophos (La Buissonne, 2014) – live
- 2014?: The Miami Jazz Project with Arthur Barron, Abel Pabon (Zoho, 2014)
- 2015: Distant Song with Fred Farell (Whaling City Sound, 2018)
- 2016 Masters In Paris with Martial Solal (Sunnyside, 2020)
- 2016: The Unknowable with Tatsuya Nakatani, Adam Rudolph (RareNoise, 2018)
- 2017: Petite Fleur: The Music of Sidney Bechet with John Stowell (Origin, 2018)
- 2018: Chi with Adam Rudolph, Hamid Drake (RareNoise, 2019) – live
- 2019?: Four Visions with David Binney, Donny McCaslin, Samuel Blais (Sunnyside, 2019)
- 2019?: On The Corner Live! with Jeff Coffin, Victor Wooten, Chester Thompson, Chris Walters, James Dasilva (Ear Up, 2019) – live
- 2019: Journey Around The Truth with Andy Emler (Unknown, 2019)
- 2019: Mussorgsky Pictures Revisited with Kristjan Randalu (Budapest Music Center, 2020)
- 2019-20: The Rise Up with Mehmet Ali Sanlikol (Dunya, 2020)
- 2020: Quint5t with Randy Brecker, Marc Copland, Drew Gress, Joey Baron (InnerVoice Jazz, 2020)
- 2021: New Now with Tyshawn Sorey, Adam Rudolph (Meta, 2022) – live

=== As a member ===
Open Sky
(With Bob Moses and Frank Tusa)

- Open Sky (PM, 1973) – rec. 1972
- Spirit in the Sky (PM, 1975)

Zytron
(With James Zitro)

- New Moon In Zytron (Pacific Arts, 1978)

Quest
(With Al Foster, Billy Hart, George Mraz, Richard Beirach and Ron McClure)

- Quest (Trio, 1982) – rec. 1981
- Quest II (Storyville, 1986) - Live
- Midpoint: Quest III (Storyille, 1988)
- N.Y. Nites: Standards (PAN Music/NEC Avenue, 1988)
- Natural Selection (Pathfinder/NEC Avenue, 1988)
- Of One Mind (CMP, 1990)
- Redemption; Quest Live in Europe (Hatology, 2007) - live
- Re-Dial - Live In Hamburg (Outnote, 2007) - live
- Circular Dreaming (enja, 2012) - rec. 2011

Saxophone Summit
(With Joe Lovano, Michael Brecker and Ravi Coltrane)

- Gathering of Spirits (Telarc, 2004)
- Seraphic Light (Telarc, 2008) – rec. 2007
- Visitation (ArtistShare, 2014) – rec. 2011
- Street Talk (Enja, 2019) – rec. 2017

New Light
(With Gene Perla)

- Live in Oslo (PM, 2007) – live rec. 2006

The Generations Quartet
(As leader with Billy Test, Evan Gregor and Ian Froman)

- Invitation (Albert Murray/John Aveni, 2021) – rec. 2000

=== As sideman ===
With Elvin Jones

- Genesis (Blue Note, 1971)
- Merry Go Round (Blue Note, 1972) – rec. 1971
- Live at the Lighthouse (Blue Note, 1973)[2LP] – live rec. September 1972
- Mr. Jones (Blue Note, 1973) – rec. 1972
- The Main Force (Vanguard, 1976)
- Live at Carnegie Hall (PM, 2018) – live rec. 1972

With Miles Davis

- On the Corner (Columbia, 1972) – session of June 1, 1972 only
- Get Up with It (Columbia, 1974) – compilation. on 2 tracks.
- Dark Magus (CBS/Sony, 1977) – live rec. March 1974
- Berlin '73 (Jazz Masters, 1993) – unofficial
- Black Satin (Jazz Masters, 1994)[2CD] – unofficial
- Another Bitches Brew (Jazz Door, 1995)[2CD] – unofficial

With John McLaughlin

- My Goal's Beyond (Douglas, 1971)

With Terumasa Hino

- Journey to Air (Love, 1970)
- City Connection (Flying Disc, 1979)

With Vic Juris

- Music of Alec Wilder (Double-Time, 1996)
- A Second Look (Mel Bay, 2005)

With Michael Feinberg

- From Where We Came (Steeplechase Records, 2022)

With Michael Feinberg

- Blues Variant (Criss Cross Records, 2024)

With Tom Harrell

- Sail Away (Contemporary, 1989)
- Visions (Contemporary, 1991) – rec. 1987-90

With Teo Macero

- Impressions of Charles Mingus (Palo Alto, 1983)
- Acoustical Suspension (Doctor Jazz, 1985)

With Bob Moses

- Bittersuite in the Ozone (Mozown, 1975)
- Visit with the Great Spirit (Gramavision, 1984) – rec. 1983
- The Story of Moses (Gramavision, 1987)[2LP]

With others

- Rez Abbasi, Snake Charmer (Earth Sounds, 2005)
- Jeff Berlin, In Harmony's Way (M.A.J., 2001) – live rec. 2000
- Joanne Brackeen, Pink Elephant Magic (Arkadia Jazz, 1999)
- Randy Brecker, Peter Erskine, Tim Hagans, The Avatar Sessions (Fuzzy Music, 2009)
- Linc Chamberland, A Place Within (Muse, 1977)
- Jimmy Cobb, So Nobody Else Can Hear (Contempo Vibrato, 1983) – rec. 1981
- Aydin Esen, Anadolu (Columbia/Sony, 1992)
- Charles Evans, Subliminal Leaps (More Is More, 2013)
- Michael Franks, Tiger in the Rain (Warner Bros., 1979) – rec. 1978
- Al Foster, Mr. Foster (Better Days, 1979)
- Kip Hanrahan, Coup De Tete (American Clave, 1981)
- Billy Hart, Rah (Gramavision, 1988)
- Phil Haynes, No Fast Food (CornerStoreJazz, 2014)
- Conrad Herwig, New York Breed (Double-Time, 1996)
- John Hollenbeck, No Images (CRI/Blueshift, 2001)
- Nobuyoshi Ino, Mountain (Nippon Columbia, 1981)
- David Kane, Drew Gress, Tony Martucci, Machinery of the Night (Magellan, 2006)
- Ryo Kawasaki Group, Nature's Revenge (MPS, 1978)
- Masabumi Kikuchi, Susto (CBS/Sony, 1981) – rec. 1980-81
- Abbey Lincoln, People in Me (Philips, 1973)
- Steve Masakowski, Mars (Prescription, 1983)
- McGill Jazz Ensemble Day and Night (McGill, 1988)
- Jill McManus Symbols of Hopi (Concord Jazz, 1984) – rec. 1983
- Arnon Palty, Treasure Map (JazZone, 2012)
- Erin McDougald, Outside the Soiree (Miles High, 2017)
- Nellie McKay, Obligatory Villagers (Hungry Mouse, 2007)
- Jill McManus, Symbols of Hopi (Concord Jazz, 1984)
- Robert Musso, Innermedium (DIW, 1999)
- Esther Phillips, From a Whisper to a Scream (Kudu, 1971)
- Abbey Rader, Inner Voices (Abray, 1997)
- Pete La Roca, SwingTime, SwingTime (Blue Note, 1997)
- Badal Roy, Passing Dreams (Geetika, 2002)
- Masahiko Satoh, All-In All-Out (CBS/Sony, 1979)
- John Scofield, Who's Who? (Arista Novus, 1979)
- John Stowell, The Banff Sessions (Origin, 2002)
- Ten Wheel Drive, Brief Replies (Polydor, 1970)
- Fred Tompkins, Somesville (F.K.T., 1975)
- T-Square and Friends, Miss You in New York (Sony, 1995)
- Kazumi Watanabe, Dogatana (Denon, 1981)
