= Frank Tusa =

American jazz musician (1947–2026)

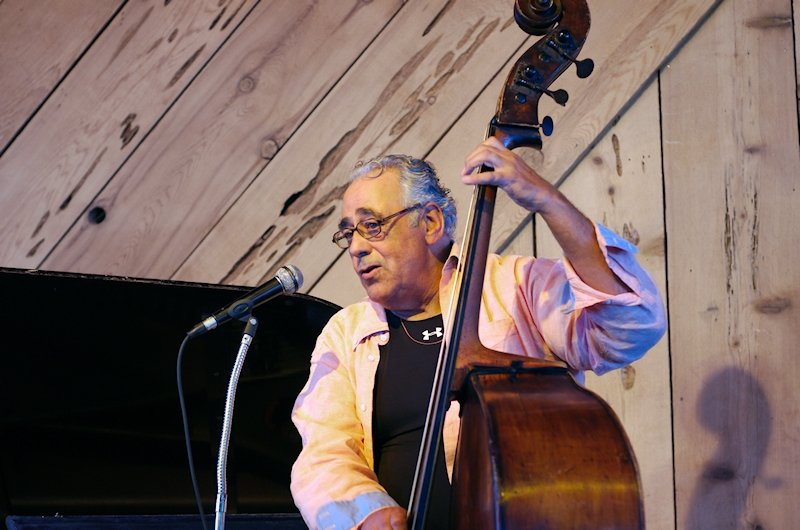
Frank Tusa in 2013

Frank Tusa (April 1, 1947 – July 26, 2026) was an American jazz double-bassist, composer, and educator.

== Life and career ==
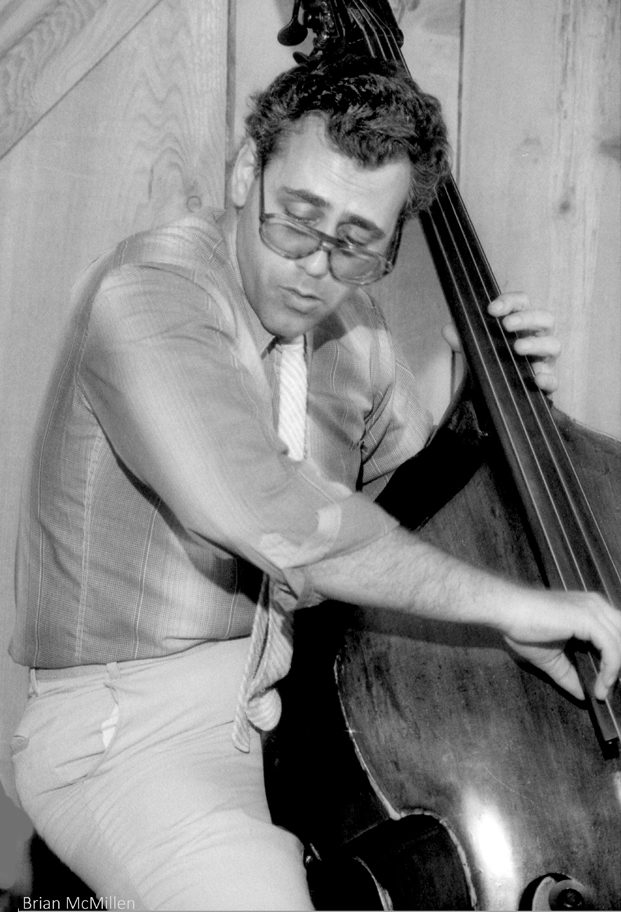
Frank Tusa at Bach Dancing & Dynamite Society, Half Moon Bay CA 4/84

Frank Tusa was born in New York City on April 1, 1947. He played guitar before switching to bass at age ten. Tusa worked in a Broadway pit orchestra and then played while serving in the Army. He worked with Paul Bley (1970–71), Horace Arnold (1971), and in the Open Sky trio with Dave Liebman and Rakalam Bob Moses in 1972–74. Early in the 1970s he also played with Dave Holland, Collin Walcott, and Dom Um Romão, the last on electric bass. In the middle of the decade he toured Europe in Dave Liebman's Lookout Farm ensemble with Richard Beirach, Jeff Williams, and Badal Roy. He recorded around this time with Barry Miles, Booker Ervin, Don Cherry, Freddie Hubbard, Lee Konitz, and Harold Mabern.Tusa has had a wide variety of recording, and performing experiences with such diverse artists as Art Blakey, Buddy Montgomery, Stan Getz, Chet Baker, Pepper Adams, Shelly Manne, Bobby Hutcherson, Johnny Griffin, Herb Ellis, Art Farmer, Randy Brecker, Freddie Hubbard, John Abercrombie, George Cables, and many other great jazz artists. Tusa's early recordings are with jazz legends Paul Bley, Don Cherry, and Dave Liebman. Frank was one of the original members of Dave Liebman's critically acclaimed group “Lookout Farm”.

In 1980 Frank relocated to San Francisco. After arriving in San Francisco he became well known for his skill in music. He has taught at San Jose State University and Stanford University.

His first album as a leader was released on Enja Records in 1975 which was remastered in 24 bit and re-released in 2006. 1977 saw him collaborating with Art Blakey, and working in the Eon trio with Richie Beirach. He played in San Francisco in the 1980s.

Frank Tusa died on July 26, 2026, at the age of 79.

== Discography ==
=== As leader ===
- Reunion of Old Spirits (Tuse Records, 1997)
- Father Time (Enja Records, 1975)

=== As sideman ===
- Paul Bley: The Paul Bley Synthesizer Show (Milestone, 1971)
- Richard Beirach: Eon (ECM, 1974)
- David Liebman: Lookout Farm (ECM, 1973)
- David Liebman: Sweet Hands (Horizon, 1975)
- David Liebman Quintet: Pendulum (Artists House, 1978)
- Chet Baker: Live & Rare (2011-Master Classics Records)
- John Handy & Mel Martin: Bebop and Beyond (1984-Concord Records)
- Chet Baker: Out of the Blue- Live at the Dutch Sesjun Radio Show-1980(Released in 2010)
- Chet Baker: Live at the Great American Music Hall, San Francisco (1982-GAMH )
- Bobbe Norris & Larry Dunlap: Hoisted Sails (1984-Palo Alto Records)
- Hi-Lo's: Live in Japan at Budakan Hall, Tokyo Japan
- Paul Bley: The Paul Bley Synthesizer Show (1970-Milestones)
- Richard Beirach: Methusalah (1975-Trio Records)
- Richard Beirach: Sunday Song (1975-Trio Records)
- Barry Miles: Scatbird (1972-Mainstream Records)
- Dom Um Romao: Spirit of the Times
- Badal Roy: Ashibad (1975-Trio Records)
- Badal Roy: Passing Dreams (1975- Adamo)
- Fred Tompkins: Cecile (1978-F.K.T. Records)
- Rimona Francis: (1977-MPS Records)
- Vibraphone Summit Tour with Karl Berger: (1978-MPS Records)
- Dave Liebman: Keeper of the Past
- Dave Liebman: Open Sky (1972-PM Records)
- Dave Liebman: Spirit in the Sky (1975-PM Records)
- Dave Liebman: Nightscapes (1970 CBS/Sony -Japan)

== Sources ==
- "Frank Tusa". Grove Jazz online.
