= Doin' It Again (Dave Liebman album) =

Studio album by David Liebman Quintet
- Released: 1980
- Recorded: 1979
- Studio: Platinum Studios, Brooklyn, N.Y.
- Genre: Jazz
- Length: 37:48
- Label: Timeless; SJP 140
- Producer: David Liebman and Arthur Barron

David Liebman chronology
The Opal Heart (1979)	Doin' It Again (1980)	Dedications (1979)

Doin' It Again is an album by saxophonist David Liebman which was recorded in Brooklyn in 1979 and released on the Dutch Timeless label.

== Reception ==
Professional ratings
Review scores
Source	Rating
AllMusic	3/5 stars

The AllMusic review by Steve Loewy stated, "Considering what Liebman's quintet was able to achieve on If They Only Knew this one is a bit of a disappointment ... While there are plenty of good moments throughout this recording, there are better examples of the saxophonist's work."

== Track listing ==
All compositions by David Liebman except where noted

1. "Doin' It Again" – 9:41
2. "Lady" (Ron McClure) – 9:36
3. "Stardust" (Hoagy Carmichael, Mitchell Parish) – 9:22
4. "Cliff's Vibes" – 8:54

== Personnel ==
- David Liebman – tenor saxophone, soprano saxophone
- Terumasa Hino – trumpet, flugelhorn, percussion
- John Scofield – guitar
- Ron McClure – bass, electric bass
- Adam Nussbaum – drums
