= Temple of Birth =

Studio album by Jeremy Steig
- Released: 1975
- Recorded: 1975
- Studio: Electric Lady Studios, New York City, NY
- Genre: Jazz
- Length: 46:00
- Label: Columbia; KC 33297
- Producer: Jeremy Steig

Jeremy Steig chronology
Monium (1974)	Temple of Birth (1975)	Leaving (1976)

Temple of Birth is an album by American jazz flautist Jeremy Steig released on the Columbia label in 1975.

Professional ratings
Review scores
Source	Rating
Allmusic	4.5/5 stars

== Track listing ==
All compositions by Jeremy Steig except where noted

1. "King Tut Strut" (Jeremy Steig, Richard Beirach, Alphonse Mouzon, Anthony Jackson, Ray Mantilla, Johnny Winter) − 8:38
2. "Gale" (Beirach) − 2:35
3. "Ouanga" (Steig, Beirach, Mouzon, Jackson, Mantilla, Winter) − 7:58
4. "Mountain Dew Dues" (Steig, Winter) − 3:53
5. "Goose Bumps" (Mouzon) − 3:56
6. "Belly Up" − 3:16
7. "Temple of Birth" − 2:14
8. "Shifte-Telle Mama" − 9:39
9. "Rupunzel" (Steig, Beirach) − 2:51

== Personnel ==
- Jeremy Steig – flute, Armstrong bass flute
- Johnny Winter − acoustic guitar, electric guitar (tracks 1, 3 & 4)
- Richie Beirach − acoustic piano, electric piano
- Anthony Jackson − bass guitar (tracks 1–6 & 8)
- Alphonse Mouzon – drums (tracks 1–6 & 8)
- Ray Mantilla − congas, percussion (tracks 1–4, 6 & 8)
