= Eon (album) =

Studio album by Richard Beirach
- Released: 1975
- Recorded: November 1974
- Studio: Generation Sound; New York City
- Genre: Jazz
- Length: 38:08
- Label: ECM 1054 ST
- Producer: Manfred Eicher

Richard Beirach chronology
Eon (1975)	Forgotten Fantasies (1975)

Eon is an album by American jazz pianist and composer Richard Beirach recorded in November 1974 and released on ECM the following year. The trio features rhythm section Frank Tusa and Jeff Williams.

== Reception ==
The AllMusic review by Chuck Berg awarded the album 2½ stars calling it a "well-programmed set".

Professional ratings
Review scores
Source	Rating
AllMusic	2.5/5 stars

== Track listing ==
All tracks are written by Richard Beirach except as indicated.

Side I
No.	Title	Writer(s)	Length
1.	"Nardis"	Miles Davis	11:56
2.	"Places"	Dave Liebman	4:04
3.	"Seeing You"	Frank Tusa; Richard Beirach	4:05
Total length:			20:05

Side II
No.	Title	Length
1.	"Eon"	8:13
2.	"Bones"	3:34
3.	"Mitsuku"	6:16
Total length:		18:03 38:08

== Personnel ==
- Richard Beirach – piano
- Frank Tusa – bass
- Jeff Williams – drums

=== Technical personnel ===
- Manfred Eicher – producer
- Carlos Albrecht – mixing engineer
- Tony May – recording engineer
- Eugene Gregan – cover design
- B & B Wojirsch – layout
- Shelley Rusten – cover photos
