= First Visit =

Studio album by David Liebman
- Released: 1973
- Recorded: June 20–21, 1973
- Studio: Aoyama Victor Studio, Tokyo, Japan
- Genre: Jazz
- Length: 45:35
- Label: Philips; RJ 5101
- Producer: Toshinari Koinuma

David Liebman chronology
Open Sky (1973)	First Visit (1973)	Lookout Farm (1973)

First Visit is an album by saxophonist David Liebman which was recorded in Tokyo in 1973 and originally released on the Japanese Philips label before being reissued by West 54 Records in 1980 and on CD by West Wind Records in 1991.

Professional ratings
Review scores
Source	Rating
AllMusic	3/5 stars

== Track listing ==
All compositions by David Liebman except where noted

1. "Man-Child" (Richie Beirach) – 12:11
2. "Vedana" (Dave Holland) – 10:07
3. "'Round About Midnight" (Thelonious Monk, Cootie Williams, Bernie Hanighen) – 7:49
4. "Rommy's Hut" – 3:29
5. "Lonnie's Song" – 3:04
6. "First Visit" – 8:55

== Personnel ==
- David Liebman – tenor saxophone, soprano saxophone, flute
- Richard Beirach – piano
- Dave Holland – bass
- Jack DeJohnette – drums
