= Light'n Up, Please! =

Studio album by David Liebman
- Released: 1977
- Recorded: May and September 1976
- Studio: Record Plant, Sausalito, CA and Electric Lady Studios, NYC
- Genre: Jazz
- Length: 38:24
- Label: Horizon; SP-721
- Producer: David Liebman, Pee Wee Ellis and John Snyder

David Liebman chronology
Forgotten Fantasies (1975)	Light'n Up, Please! (1977)	Pendulum (1978)

Light'n Up, Please! is an album by saxophonist David Liebman which was recorded in California and New York in 1976 and released on the Horizon label.

== Reception ==
Professional ratings
Review scores
Source	Rating
AllMusic	1.5/5 stars

The AllMusic review by Richard S. Ginell stated, "Dave Liebman plunges headlong into funk in the wake of Herbie Hancock's Head Hunters, but his heart doesn't seem to be in it. At times, he sounds bored playing R&B riffs that he seemed to have outgrown at the time, lapsing into free jazz flurries in an effort to stay interested, and the rhythm section is leaden."

== Track listing ==
All compositions by David Liebman except where noted

1. "Light'n Up, Please!" – 6.40
2. "Children Of The Ghetto" (Eleana Steinman, Leon Thomas (lyrics) David Liebman, Pee Wee Ellis, Leon Thomas (music)) – 3:45
3. "Tranquility Of The Protective Aura" (Harold Williams) – 5:55
4. "The Fonz's Strut" (David Liebman, Pee Wee Ellis) – 5:54
5. "Got To Work" (David Liebman (lyrics) David Liebman, Pee Wee Ellis, Leon Thomas (music)) – 3:15
6. "Chicken Soup" (David Liebman, Pee Wee Ellis) – 3:54
7. "Exquisite Torture" – 5:06
8. "Win Your Love" – 1:33
9. "Slow Dance On The Killing Ground" – 4:22

== Personnel ==
- David Liebman – tenor saxophone, soprano saxophone, C flute, alto flute, electric piano, talking drum, percussion, vocals
- Pee Wee Ellis – tenor saxophone, soprano saxophone, electric piano, percussion, vocals
- Harold Williams – electric piano, minimoog, vocals (tracks 3, 6, 7 & 9)
- Richie Beirach – acoustic piano (track 8)
- Link Chamberland (tracks 1, 3, 5–7 & 9), Chris Hayes (tracks 1, 2, 4 & 5) – electric guitar
- Jeff Berlin (tracks 3, 6, 7 & 9), Tony Saunders (tracks 1, 2, 4 & 5) – electric bass
- Jimmy Strassburg – drums, percussion
- Al Foster – drums (tracks 3, 6, 7 & 9)
- Juma Santos – congas, percussion (on 1, 3, 5–7 & 9)
- Sonny Brown – percussion (track 6)
- Leon Thomas – vocals, percussion (tracks 1, 5 & 6)
