= Richie Beirach at Maybeck =

Live album by Richie Beirach
- Recorded: January 5, 1992
- Venue: Maybeck Recital Hall, Berkeley, California
- Genre: Jazz
- Label: Concord

Richie Beirach at Maybeck: Maybeck Recital Hall Series Volume Nineteen is an album of solo performances by jazz pianist Richie Beirach.

== Music and recording ==
The album was recorded at the Maybeck Recital Hall in Berkeley, California on January 5, 1992. Most of the tracks are standards; the final one, "Elm", is the only original, and comes from Beirach's 1979 album Elm. The format "allows Beirach to exploit his romantic credentials with only a nominal interest in the usual bop formulas, and he throws in a few startling unorthodox glissandos here and there to shake everyone up. Very often, he works compellingly with repetitions in the left hand".

== Release and reception ==
Professional ratings
Review scores
Source	Rating
AllMusic	4.5/5 stars
The Penguin Guide to Jazz	3.5/4 stars
The Rolling Stone Jazz & Blues Album Guide	3/5 stars
The Virgin Encyclopedia of Jazz	4/5 stars

The AllMusic reviewer described it as "A most absorbing recital, cleanly recorded." The Penguin Guide to Jazz commented that his playing is less abstract than on other recordings, and that the standards are perhaps performed too elaborately. Pianist Liam Noble described Beirach's performance of "'Round Midnight": beginning "with some quiet colours, he quickly glissandos into expressionistic contrasts of texture: it feels very spontaneous, as if he's embellishing a classic fairytale with every device he can find, making it up as he goes along. The solo section steams along at a double tempo, but it's brought to a sudden halt with a return to softer textures".

== Track listing ==
1. "Introductory Announcement"
2. "All the Things You Are"
3. "On Green Dolphin Street"
4. "Some Other Time"
5. "You Don't Know What Love Is"
6. "Spring Is Here"
7. "All Blues"
8. "Over the Rainbow/Small World/In the Wee Small Hours of the Morning"
9. "'Round Midnight"
10. "Remember"
11. "Elm"

== Personnel ==
- Richie Beirach – piano
