= Drum Ode =

Studio album by Dave Liebman
- Released: 1975
- Recorded: May 1974
- Studio: Record Plant; New York City
- Genre: Jazz
- Length: 43:41
- Label: ECM 1046 ST
- Producer: Manfred Eicher

Dave Liebman chronology
Lookout Farm (1973)	Drum Ode (1975)	Sweet Hands (1975)

CD Reissue Cover

Professional ratings
Review scores
Source	Rating
Penguin Guide to Jazz	4/4 stars
AllMusic	3/5 stars
The Rolling Stone Jazz Record Guide	4/5 stars

Drum Ode is an album by American jazz saxophonist Dave Liebman recorded in May 1974 and released on ECM the following year. The ensemble, thirteen strong, consists guitarist John Abercrombie, pianist Richard Beirach, bassist Gene Perla, eight percussionists—Bob Moses, Jeff Williams, Patato Valdez, Barry Altschul, Steve Sattan, Badal Roy, Collin Walcott, and Ray Armandox—and singer Eleana Sternberg.

== Reception ==
The Penguin Guide to Jazz selected this album as part of its suggested "Core Collection".

The AllMusic review awarded the album 3 stars.

== Track listing ==
All compositions by Dave Liebman except as indicated

1. "Goli Dance" (Traditional) – 0:34
2. "Loft Dance" – 9:18
3. "Oasis" (Liebman, Eleana Steinberg) – 5:29
4. "The Call" – 4:47
5. "Your Lady" (John Coltrane) – 6:37
6. "The Iguana's Ritual" – 10:34
7. "Satya Dhawani (True Sound)" – 6:22

== Personnel ==
- Dave Liebman – soprano saxophone, tenor saxophone, alto flute
- John Abercrombie – electric and acoustic guitars
- Richard Beirach – electric piano
- Gene Perla – electric and acoustic basses
- Bob Moses, Jeff Williams – drums
- Patato Valdez – congas, electric congas
- Barry Altschul, Steve Sattan – percussion
- Badal Roy, Collin Walcott – tabla
- Ray Armando – bongos, percussion
- Eleana Steinberg – vocal
