= Gregor Huebner =

German musician (born 1967)

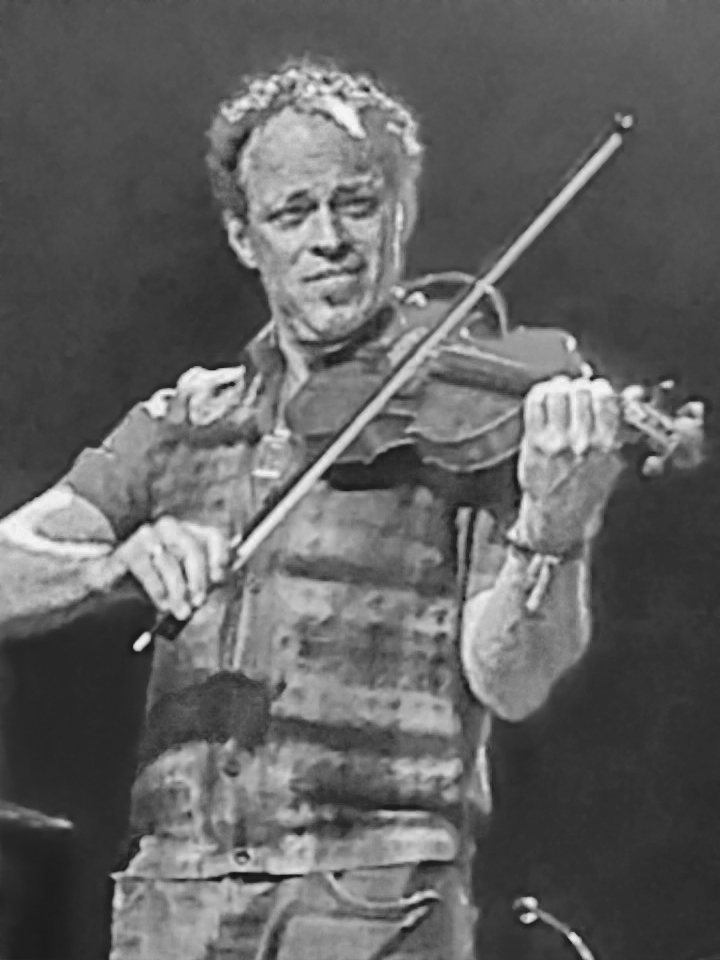
- Gregor Huebner

Background information
- Born: Gregor Hübner; 23 May 1967 (age 59)
- Origin: Stuttgart, Germany, E.U.
- Genre: Jazz
- Occupations: Musician, Composer
- Instruments: Violin, Piano
- Website: www.GregorHuebner.com

Gregor Huebner (born May 23, 1967) is a violinist, pianist and composer. He performs solo and with several ensembles including El Violin Latino, Sirius Quartet, Berta Epple and Salsafuerte. From 1985 to 2012 he was a member of Tango Five. He is a professor of composition at the University for Music and Theater in Munich, Germany. In 2017 he received the Grand Prize for New York Philharmonic's New World Initiative Composition Challenge for his composition “New World, Nov 9. 2016.”

== Life and work ==
Following his graduation from the Ravensburger Spohn school, Huebner studied classical violin, jazz piano and composition at the Conservatories of Vienna and Stuttgart with Florian Auer Two and Gerhard Voss.

In 1985, Huebner and his brother Veit Hübner began performing with Tango Five. The band performed both at the World Exhibition 1992 (Seville) and 2000 (Hanover) and at the 2004 Athens Olympics. They also appeared at the 1998 Tango Festival in Montevideo and Buenos Aires. Tango Five disbanded in 2012. Three members (Bobbi Fischer, Gregor Huebner and Veit Hübner) created a new group called Berta Epple in 2012.

In 1996, he began collaborating with pianist Richie Beirach. Their album Round About Frederik Mompou was nominated for the Latin Grammy 2002. Other recordings include Round About Bartok released in March 2000 (ACT company), Beirach/Huebner/Mraz Round about Monteverdi in 2003 and Duo Beirach/Huebner Duality (Niveau Records) in 2007.

In 1997, he began work with Johnny Almendra on three albums Los Jovenes del Barrio, Eye Contact and Son Radical. He played with Randy Brecker, John Patitucci, Billy Hart, Mark Feldman, Smokey Robinson, David Darling, Uri Caine, Tim Hagans and the Absolut Ensemble. He recorded with Joe Zawinul and Diane Reeves.

In 2009, he released Exercises, Etudes and Concert Pieces with Advanced Music and Eric Carle's Ich habe die Geige klingen sehen at the Gerstenberg Verlag. In the same year he published his orchestra compositions at Norsk Musikvorlag. In the same year he scored the movie Bergwehen for the German movie channel ZDF together with Gerd Baumann. The movie was nominated for the German TV Awards in 2011.

Huebner's critically acclaimed Latin Jazz album El Violin Latino was released in 2011. The Latin Jazz Network selected it as a Noteworthy Recording of 2011 and the album won Nr. 3 Best CD in 2011 on WBGO New York. He is currently recording a new album entitled El Violin Latino - Vol 2. The album features musicians—Johnny Almendra, Latin percussion, Klaus Mueller, piano, Ruben Rodriguez, bass, Louis Bauzo, Latin percussion, Jerome Goldschmidt, percussion, Marcos Napa, Afro-Peruvian percussion and Karen Joseph, flute—performing new arrangements of Cuban, Brazilian & Tango Music. It is expected to be released in the fall of 2015.

He is the uncle of Rikas drummer Ferdinand Hübner, the son of Veit Hübner.

== Musical style ==
Huebner's style as a composer is a mix of his musical heritage, the folk music of eastern Europe, his studies of contemporary music and "Neue Music" in Vienna and Stuttgart. While studying and living in New York City he focused on Jazz Improvisation and developed a keen interest in different kinds of world music particularly Latin American music styles. As a violinist and pianist he performs all of these styles with his groups, El Violin Latino, Sirius Quartet, Berta Epple, Richie Beirach Duo/Quartet, his own NY-NRG Quartet and his newly founded Munich Composers Collective.

== Prizes, awards, and commissions ==
Huebner has been lauded with awards in Europe and the United States including the Jazz award of the State Baden-Württemberg in 1998 and the "President’s Award" of the Manhattan School of Music in 1996. In 2017 he was awarded the Grand Prize for New York Philharmonic’s New World Initiative Composition Challenge for his composition “New World, Nov 9. 2016.”

He has written commission for Intentional Bachakademie in Stuttgart, Germany, Grand Theatre Luxemburg, Musikfest Stuttgart 2010, Tribeka New Music Festival 2012, a piano concerto for Musikfest Stuttgart in 2013. He 2014 he was commissioned to compose a lyrical setting of poems by William Blake written for Sirius Quartet and the Stuttgart Collegium Iuvenum Boys Choir and an orchestral composition for the Radio Symphonie Orchester and the SWR Big Band.

His works have been premiered by the Pittsburgh Symphony Orchestra, Landesakademie Ochsenhausen, and his string quartet “NYC” premiered at the Andy Warhol Museum in Pittsburgh.

Huebner has performed in Jazz festivals around the globe including Cork (Ireland), Tbilisi (Georgia), Montreux, New York (JVC, Bell Atlantic), Hollywood Bowl in Los Angeles, CA (Tango Festival), Stuttgart, Germany (Jazz Open) and Porto (Portugal). Sirius Quartet performed at the Taichung Jazz Festival, Taiwan's largest jazz event, in 2013 and 2014. The 2014 Festival opened with a performance by English Jazz Pianist John Escreet performing with Sirius Quartet.

He has performed at major concert halls around the globe including Carnegie Hall, Apollo Theater, Berlin Philharmonie, Frauenkirche in Dresden, Gewandhaus Leipzig. Each summer he participates in an International Summer Music Festival in Messinia, Greece.

== Discography ==
- Berta Epple: Egal was kommt (2014)
- SalsaFuerte: feat: Ymaria (Edel Content)
- Gregor Huebner: Racing Mind (Neuklang)
- Gregor Huebner: El Violin Latino (peregrino music)
- Sirius Quartet: Cityscapes (CD Baby)
- Musik in Deutschland 1950–2000 (Sony/BMG)
- Gregor Huebner: New York Lounge (Niveau Records)
- Salsafuerte: Fantasia (Peregrina Music)
- Gregor Huebner / New York NRG Quartet (Niveau Records)
- Sirius String Quartet: In between (Cimp Records)
- Huebner / Schwarz / Huebner / Württembergischer Kammerchor: FigureJazz (Niveau Records)
- Richie Beirach / Gregor Huebner: Duality (Niveau Records)
- Marino / Huebner / Beirach: Beauty (Intuition)
- Salsafuerte: No Limits (Peregrina Music)
- TANGO FIVE: Europique Music (Peregrina Music)
- TANGO FIVE: Amando à Buenos Aires (Peregrina Music)
- TANGO FIVE: Obcesion (Satin Doll + Tokuma Japan)
- TANGO FIVE: Symphonic Tango Night (Mediaphon)
- Beirach / Hübner / Mraz: Round About F. Mompou (ACT)
- Beirach / Hübner / Mraz: Round About Bartok (ACT/Tokuma)
- Beirach / Hübner / Mraz: Round About Monteverdi (ACT)
- Gregor Hübner Quintet: Panonien (Satin Doll, Jazzheads)
- Gregor Hübner Quintet: Januschke's time (Satin Doll)
- The Huebner Brothers: Memories (Satin Doll)
- Beirach / Hübner Duo: New York Rhapsody (Tokuma/Japan)
- Bernd Ruf / Gregor Hübner: New York Stories (Mediaphon)
- Paul Schwarz / Gregor Hübner: elegie (dml-records)
- Salsa Fuerte: Nuyorican Nights

== Compositions ==
- July 2014 - "Clockwork Interrupted" for Big Band and Symphonic Orchestra - World Premiere July 10, 2014
- June 2014 “Six Songs of Innocence,” a lyrical setting of poems by William Blake, performed by Sirius Quartet and the Collegium Iuvenum Stuttgart Boys Choir - World Premiere June 10, 2014
- May 2012 - CUBAN BLUES, the new CD by Salsafuerte released on Edel Records features compositions by G.Huebner a.o.
- April 2012 - Premier of "Colors of the East" for string quintet and accordion, commissioned by Tribeka New Music, New York for the TNM Festival 2012
- March 2012 - US premiere of Huebner's Violinkonzert Nr.2 and Ground Zero for violin and orchestra with the Nova Philharmonic Orchestra in der Good Shepherd Church New York
- January 2012 - ELLEGUA'S MIND, commissioned for a production of the SWR Radio BigBand for the 60-year anniversary of the state Baden Württemberg Jubilaeum
- January 2011 - EL VIOLIN LATINO released on the Peregrina label with compositions by Gregor Huebner next to well known Cuban, Brazilian and Argentinian compositions.
- 2010/11 - In the 2010/2011 concert season "Cuban Impressions" was played by the New York-based contemporary music group Face The Music including a performance at the ASCAP concert music awards
- September 2010 - Premiere of "De Profundis für Schumann" for choir, orchestra and 7 soloists, commissioned by the International Bachakademy in Stuttgart for the Musikfest 2010
- May 2010 - The CD RACING MIND released on Neuklang features Gregor Huebner's compositions: Cello Concerto, Violin Concerto Nr.2, Cuban Impressions und Capriccio. This compositions are published by Enja Musikverlag.
- March 2010 - Premiere of "Drums and Dance" commissioned by Grand Theater Luxemburg and Theater Esch
- November 2009 - Premiere of "Streichquintett Nr1 op35" with the Sirius String Quartet and Ken Filiano on bass in a concert at Salon Harlem in New York
- September 2009 - Score for the movie "Bergwehen" in cooperation with Gerd Baumann for the German ZDF Channel
- June 2009 - Book release "Ich habe die Geige klingen sehen" by Eric Carle including Gregor Hübner's Komposition "I see a song" on
- May 2009 - Latin Violin, African Portraits and Conga Concerto published by Norsk Music Vorlag in Norway
- February 2009 - Premiere: Sirius String Quartet meets Isabel Gotzkowski and Friends, performing Gregor Huebner's String Quartet #2 op8
- January 2009 - Concert at the Andy Warhol Museum in Pittsburgh: Sirius String Quartet playing the Strinquartet #3 op27 composed by Gregor Huebner
- November 2008 - Premiere of the “Double concerto for saxophon, violine and orchestra” a commission of the town Rutesheim
- October 2008 - Premiere of the “Cello concerto Nr.1” for violoncello and orchestra at the state Academie of music Ochsenhausn
- November 2007 - Premiere of “Buxtehude 21” at the Buxtehude festival in Lübeck and “Mayim” for 10 Musicians and 33 dancers at the Stadtheater Fürth
- October 2007 - Premiere of “New York, string quartet #3” and “Cuban Impressions” for string quartet and string orchestra
- March 2007 - Release of the CD “FigureJazz” on Niveau Records with works for choir by Poulenc and Huebner
- February 2006 - Premiere of “Trazzom” for 2 violins, 2 pianos, violoncello and doublebass
- December 2005 - Premiere of “African Visions” for string quintet and basson at the Lyric Chamber Music Society of New York
- October 2005 - USA Premiere “Verlorene Worte-Gefundener Klang” at the German Consulate in New York. Premiere of “I see a song” for violin solo commissioned by the state library of Baden Württemberg
- September 2005 - Premiere of “Bach 21” for Orchestra, 5singers, cello, violin and sopranosax at the European Musicfestival and Premiere of “Salve Regina” for choir and organ at the state academie of music Ochsenhausen
- July 2005 - 2007 - Composer in residence at the “state academie of music Ochsenhausen” for one year
- July 2004 - Ludwigsburger Schlossfestspiele “Le miroir d’un moment“ with the Chamber Choir of the state Baden-Württemberg, conducted by Dieter Kurz
- April 2004- Pittsburgh Premiere of "New York Stories“ with the Pittsburgh Symphony Orchestra conducted by Lucas Richman and Andrés Cárdenes
- February 2004 - Premiere of the composition “5 Latin pieces for piano” performed by Peter von Wienhardt as part of the concert series in the city of Kleve
- November 2003 - Premiere of “Le miroir d’un moment“ with the Chamber Choir of the state Baden-Württemberg, conducted by Dieter Kurz
- December 2002 - Premiere of “African Portraits", a commissioned work by the city Stuttgart, with the Stuttgart Chamber Orchestra conducted by Bernd Ruf
- September 2002 - Premiere of “Latin Suite" op. 12 for Marimba, Horn and Strings with Katarzyna Mycka (Marimba), Darius Mikulski (Horn)and the Lotus string quartet
- July 2002 - Premiere of "Concerto for Zbiggy" op. 10 for Solo violin and string orchestra with the Stuttgart Chamber Orchestra and Gregor Hübner (violin)
- November 2001 - Premiere of the string quartet "Verlorene Worte – Gefundener Klang" with the German American Chamber Ensemble
- June 2001- Premiere of the second version of "Russian Sketches" with the Heilbronn Chamber Orchestra
- March 2001 - Premiere of his composition "Concerto for Conga solo, Piano, Marimba, Timpani and String Orchestra" by the Stuttgart Chamber Orchestra at the Liederhalle Stuttgart
- June 2000 - USA Premiere of "In Memoriam Bela", "New York Stories" and "Russian Sketches" at the Bell Atlantic Jazz Festival in New York, featuring Joe Lovano and Richie Beirach
- March 2000 - Premiere of "Russian Sketches" a composition for the Stuttgart Chamber Orchestra
- 1997–1998 In 1997 and 1998 recording of two original compositions (New York Stories and In Memoriam Bela) and release on the CD "New York Stories" featuring Philharmonia Virtruosi. Premiere of this program in the Liederhalle Stuttgart with the Stuttgart Chamber Orchestra conducted by Bernd Ruf
- 1997 - Premiere of "Hymnus für Klavier" with Peter Winhardt played in the German consulate in New York
- 1996 - Premiere of the composition "New York Stories" in Ravensburg
- 1996/95 - Premiere of "Movement for piano, bass and string quartet" and “Thema und Variationen für Violine Solo" at the Manhattan School of Music

== Scholarships and awards ==
- 2017 - Grand Prize - New York Philharmonic’s New World Initiative Composition Challenge "New World, Nov 9. 2016"
- 2013 - Bayerischer Filmpreis - Bavarian Film Award "Brücke am Ibar / My Beautiful Country"
- 2012 - Arras Film Festival Audience Award
- 2011 - Best Latin Jazz CD #3 2011 WBGO for "El Violin Latino"
- 2011 - German TV Award Nomination for "Die Hebamme"
- 2010 - Festival(Igualada/Spanien) "Official Jury Awards“ for "Die Hebamme"
- 2008 - Cultural Award of the Sudeten Germans 2008
- 2002 - Latin-Grammy Nomination in the Category "Best Latin Jazz Album"
- 2002 - Scholarship of the Foundation for arts of the State Baden-Württemberg
- 1998 - Jazz award of the State Baden Württemberg
- 1996 - "President’s Award" of the Manhattan School of Music
- 1994 - Scholarship of the Foundation for Music of the State of Baden Württemberg
- 1993 - Award of the counties of Ravensburg and Weingarten
- 1992 - Culture award of the State Baden-Württemberg
- 1989 - Youth-Jazzaward 1989 with the group Bel Art Trio

== Education ==
- 1994–1996, Manhattan School of Music, Master of music in Jazz / Performance / Composition. Studied with Harold Danko, John Hicks, Richie Beirach and Ludmilla Uhlela (composition).
- 1990–1994, Hochschule für Music, Stuttgart. Studied classical violin with Prof. Voss (Melos Quartet) and Jazz piano with Paul Schwarz. Graduated in Performance and Education.
- 1988–1990, School of Music, Vienna. Studied classical violin with Prof. Zwiauer, first chair of the Vienna Symphonics.
