= Another Time (Jeff Williams album) =

Studio album by Jeff Willams
- Released: October 10, 2011
- Recorded: September 12, 2010
- Studio: Trout Studio, Brooklyn, New York
- Genre: Jazz
- Label: Whirlwind
- Producer: Jeff Williams

Jeff Willams chronology
Another Time (2011)	The Listener (2013)

Another Time is an album by jazz drummer Jeff Williams, an American expatriate living in England. The album was released on October 10, 2011 by Whirlwind Recordings.

== Track listing ==
1. Search Me
2. She Can't Be a Spy
3. Double Life
4. Purple, Blue and Red
5. Fez
6. Under the Radar
7. Go Where You're Watching
8. Another Time

== Personnel ==
- Jeff Willams – drums
- Duane Eubanks – trumpet
- John O'Gallagher – alto saxophone
- John Hébert – double bass
