= Omerta (Richie Beirach and Dave Liebman album) =

Studio album by Richard Beirach and David Liebman
- Released: 1978
- Recorded: June 9–10, 1978
- Studio: Onkio Haus, Tokyo, Japan
- Genre: Jazz
- Length: 48:47
- Label: Trio; PAP-9141
- Producer: Richard Beirach, David Leibma, Dave Baker

David Liebman chronology
Pendulum (1978)	Omerta (1978)	The Opal Heart (1979)

Richard Beirach chronology
Hubris (1977)	Omerta (1978)	Kahuna (1978)

Omerta is an album of duets by pianist Richard Beirach and saxophonist David Liebman and which was recorded in 1978 and originally released on the Japanese Trio label before being rereleased on the Danish Storyville label on CD in 1994.

== Reception ==
Professional ratings
Review scores
Source	Rating
AllMusic	4.5/5 stars

The AllMusic review by Scott Yanow stated, "a set of duets that are primarily introspective and thoughtful. However, the melodies (mixing together originals and standards) are strong, Liebman's reeds (tenor, soprano and alto flute) provide some variety, and the musical communication is very tight".

== Track listing ==
All compositions by Richard Beirach except where noted

1. "Omerta" – 7:55
2. "On Green Dolphin Street" (Bronisław Kaper, Ned Washington) – 6:36
3. "3rd Visit" (David Liebman) – 4:41
4. "Eden" – 6:41
5. "Spring Is Here" (Richard Rodgers, Lorenz Hart) – 7:12
6. "Cadaqués" – 5:54
7. "To a Spirit Once Known" (Liebman) – 5:50
8. "In a Sentimental Mood" (Duke Ellington, Manny Kurtz, Irving Mills) – 3:58

== Personnel ==
- David Liebman – tenor saxophone, soprano saxophone, alto flute
- Richard Beirach – acoustic piano (tracks 1–7)
