= Common Heart =

Recording by Richie Beirach
- Recorded: September 28–29, 1987
- Venue: Masonic Temple, New York City
- Genre: Jazz
- Label: Owl

Common Heart is a solo piano album by Richie Beirach. It was recorded in 1987 and released by Owl.

== Recording and music ==
The album of solo piano performances by Beirach was recorded at Masonic Temple, New York City, on September 28–29, 1987. The material is a mix of Beirach originals and compositions by other jazz musicians.

== Release and reception ==
Professional ratings
Review scores
Source	Rating
AllMusic	3/5 stars
The Penguin Guide to Jazz	2.5/4 stars

Common Heart was released by Owl. The AllMusic reviewer described it as "Alternately stunning and uneven solo piano work". The Penguin Guide to Jazz suggested that Beirach's style was not well suited to solo performance: "The logic is all there, but the lines are cluttered with grace-notes and over-ripe sustains." The Chicago Tribune reviewer wrote: "The solo piano is nice, but it never lifts, never cries out. Occasionally it seems to verge on a genuine sense of swing, then the dread seriousness comes back in to stifle it."

== Track listing ==
1. "Liquid Silver"
2. "For B.C."
3. "Places"
4. "Nocturne No. 2 Vignettes"
5. "Foolish Door"
6. "Midpoint"
7. "Vadanna"
8. "The Last Rhapsody"
9. "Essence"

== Personnel ==
- Richie Beirach – piano
