= Ant Trip Ceremony =

- Origin: Logan, Utah, United States
- Genres: Psychedelic rock; electronic rock
- Years active: 1967–1968
- Labels: Collectables; Lillith
- Past members: Steve Detray; George Galt; Roger Goodman; Gary Rosen; Jeff Williams; Mark Stein

The Ant Trip Ceremony was an American psychedelic rock band formed in Logan, Utah in 1967. There were two incarnations of the band; one in the summer of 1967, and another in autumn of the same year. The latter incarnation of the band was based in Oberlin College, and gained local recognition for their improvisational instrumentals. In 1968, the band released one album – before disbanding – that since then has garnered interest for its experimental electronic rock musical style. As a result, reissues of the album have been released.

== History ==
In 1967, Steve Detray, a college student in Oberlin College, visited his brother in Logan, Utah, and during that time Detray formed The Ant Trip Ceremony. The name was formulated by a college professor who read the term in a novel which described modern human society. The first version of the band briefly toured the region, but broke up when Detray returned to college for the 1967–1968 school year. Detray retained the name, and the more notable formation of the Ant Trip Ceremony was formed with other college students in the summer of 1967. The second band included Detray on lead guitar, multi instrumentalist George Galt, Roger Goodman as lead vocalist, Gary Rosen on bass guitar, Jeff Williams on drums, and Mark Stein on percussion, flute and acoustic guitar. Taking influence from west coast psychedelic rock bands, the band performed at local gigs playing mostly cover versions that they prolonged in complex instrumentals. Concerts usually lasted for hours, and the songs the band played were improvised so that no two selections were similar. The band's live material, and subsequent album, was one of the earliest examples of electronic rock mixed with eastern influences.

In February 1968, the band processed through their first of two studio sessions for their first album. The second session was in the spring of 1968, but Detray was not present for the proceedings. The band self-produced the album on campus with assistance from a student named David Crosby (not David Crosby of Byrds fame, contrary to the legend). On a low budget, the album was plagued by technical difficulties from their primitive machinery. The band used a KHL deck tape a two track Roberts reel to reel for recording. For the instances when the group wanted to multi track, they would record on one side of the track and then on the other one as well, and finally mix it into the KHL. The vocals sounded noticeably more distant than the band desired as a result of a faulty right speaker. The fault caused the speaker balance to lean heavily to the left which affected the final mix-down. The final mastering was complete in Cleveland Recordings Studio. The album, named 24 Hours, had 300 copies, highlighted by their cover version of "Hey Joe", released in 1968 and distributed by the college bookstore. The album cover featured psychedelic artwork by fellow student, artist Michael Kanarak.

By the end of 1968, the band disbanded when the members graduated from Oberlin College. Following numerous bootlegs of the band's album, an official re-release of the album was released by Collectables Records in 1999. A follow-up was released on December 2, 2010, featuring an essay on the group's recordings, a digitally remastered sound, and the original cover art.

== 24 Hours album ==
=== Side one ===
1. "Locomotive Lamp" (Rosen)
2. "What's the Matter Now" (Galt)
3. "Violets of Dawn" (Eric Anderson)
4. "Riverdawn" (Galt)
5. "Hey Joe" (Billy Roberts)
6. "Outskirts" (Neal Evans, Sandy Lyne)
7. "Little Baby" (Willie Dixon)

=== Side two ===
1. "Get Out of My Life" (Allen Toussaint)
2. "Four in the Morning" (Robin Remaily)
3. "Sometimes I Wonder" (Major Lance)
4. "Pale Shades of Gray" (Detray, Goodman)
5. "Elaborations" (Detray)
