= Jeff Williams (musician) =

American drummer

- Born: Jeffrey Lawrence Williams; July 6, 1950 (age 75); Mount Vernon, Ohio, U.S.
- Genres: Jazz, Psychedelic Rock
- Occupations: Musician, composer, educator
- Instrument: Drums
- Years active: 1960s–present
- Label: Whirlwind
- Website: willfulmusic.com

Jeffrey Lawrence Williams (born July 6, 1950) is an American jazz drummer, composer, and educator.

== Early life ==
Williams was born in Mount Vernon, Ohio, on July 6, 1950. He grew up in Oberlin, Ohio. His mother was a singer in the 1960s. Williams began playing the drums, self-taught, at the age of seven and played professionally from his mid-teens. He played drums in the Oberlin-based psychedelic rock band Ant Trip Ceremony. From 1968, "he studied arranging and composition at the Berklee School of Music".

== Later life and career ==
Williams played for a short time with various musicians in New York in 1971, joined pianist Marc Copland's band, and played for the first time with saxophonist Lee Konitz in 1972. He continued to work with Konitz on and off into the 2000s. Williams played with saxophonist Stan Getz at the end of 1972 and into early 1973, before joining the band Lookout Farm, led by Dave Liebman and Richie Beirach. Williams was also the drummer in pianist Beirach's trio for recordings in the mid-1970s.

Williams was part of the band Interplay, formed by bassist Anthony Cox and pianist Peter Madsen in the mid-1980s. This trio performed with Getz in 1987. Some of Williams's compositions were played on the albums Coalescence and Jazzblues. The former title was also the name of Williams's group from 1991 to 1996. The following year, "he formed the trio Circadian Rhythms with Tony Malaby and Michael Formanek. He also formed another trio, Left-handed Compliment, with the alto saxophonist John O'Gallagher and Madsen (on Hammond organ)".

Williams has taught at the Royal Academy of Music and the Birmingham Conservatoire.

== Personal life ==
He is married to the American author Lionel Shriver.

== Discography ==
=== As leader or co-leader ===
- Coalescence (SteepleChase, recorded in 1991, released in 1994)
- Another Time (Whirlwind, 2011)
- The Listener (Whirlwind, 2013)
- Outlier (Whirlwind, 2016)
- Lifelike (Whirlwind, 2018)
- Bloom (Whirlwind, 2019)

=== As sideman ===
With Richard Beirach

- Eon (ECM, 1974)
- Methuselah (Trio, 1975)

With Paul Bley

- Paul Plays Carla (SteepleChase, 1992)

With Ethan Iverson

- Live at Smalls (Fresh Sound, 2000)

With Lee Konitz

- Lunasea (Soul Note, 1992) with Peggy Stern
- Dig-It (SteepleChase, 1999) with Ted Brown
- First Meeting: Live in London, Volume 1 (Whirlwind, 2014)

With Dave Liebman

- Lookout Farm (ECM, 1973)
- Drum Ode (ECM, 1974)
- Sweet Hands (Horizon, 1975)

With Ant Trip Ceremony

- 24 Hours (Self-released, 1968)
