= Orquesta Akokán =

Cuban-American Latin jazz ensemble

Orquesta Akokán is a Latin jazz ensemble formed by musicians from Cuba and New York, United States. It takes inspiration from mid-twentieth century mambo musicians such as Perez Prado, Beny Moré, and Machito.

== History ==
The ensemble's name comes from the Yoruban word for "from the heart". It began as a collaboration between arranger Michael Eckroth, producer Jacob Plasse, and vocalist Jose "Pepito" Gomez. They took a trip to Cuba together to record in the style of mid-century Cuban band music, and put an ensemble together during a trip to Havana with the help of Cesar Lopez of the group Irakere. The group signed to Daptone Records in 2018, releasing a 7" single with the label and then a self-titled full-length that year. The album was nominated for a Grammy Award. In 2021, they recorded and released a second album, 16 Rayos.

== Discography ==
- Orquesta Akokán (Daptone Records, 2018)
- 16 Rayos (Daptone, 2021)
- Caracoles (Daptone, 2024)
- América! (Daptone, 2026)
