= Elm (album) =

Studio album by Richard Beirach
- Released: 1979
- Recorded: May 1979
- Studio: Tonstudio Bauer; Ludwigsburg, West Germany
- Genre: Jazz
- Length: 42:06
- Label: ECM 1142
- Producer: Manfred Eicher

Richard Beirach chronology
Hubris (1977)	Elm (1979)	Tribute to Bill Evans (1980)

Elm is an album by American jazz pianist and composer Richard Beirach recorded in May 1979 and released on ECM later that year. The trio features rhythm section George Mraz and Jack DeJohnette.

== Reception ==
The AllMusic review by David R. Adler awarded the album 4 stars stating "At the time of its release, Elm represented an emerging new standard for modern piano trio music, and it remains every bit as valid and vital".

Professional ratings
Review scores
Source	Rating
Allmusic	4/5 stars

== Track listing ==
All compositions by Richard Beirach

1. "Sea Priestess" - 11:32
2. "Pendulum" - 6:40
3. "Ki" - 5:14
4. "Snow Leopard" - 12:30
5. "Elm" - 6:10

== Personnel ==
- Richard Beirach – piano
- George Mraz – bass
- Jack DeJohnette – drums
