= Antarctica (Richie Beirach album) =

Studio album by Richie Beirach
- Recorded: September 12–14, 1985
- Studio: Mediasound, New York City
- Genre: Jazz
- Label: Pathfinder

Antarctica is a solo piano album by Richie Beirach. It was recorded in 1985 and released by Pathfinder.

== Recording and music ==
The album of solo piano performances by Beirach was recorded at Mediasound, New York City, on September 12–14, 1985. All of the compositions are Beirach originals.

== Release and reception ==
Professional ratings
Review scores
Source	Rating
AllMusic	4/5 stars
The Penguin Guide to Jazz	3/4 stars

Antarctica was released by Pathfinder. The AllMusic reviewer wrote that Beirach "hits sometimes and misses at other times, but it's certainly good to hear something besides standards and hard bop, even when it's more mood than substance."

== Track listing ==
1. "Antarctica Suite, Part One: The Ice Shelf"
2. "Antarctica Suite, Part One: Neptune's Bellows"
3. "Antarctica Suite, Part One: Penguins On Parade"
4. "Antarctica Suite, Part One: Deception Island"
5. "Antarctica Suite, Part Two: Mirage"
6. "Antarctica Suite, Part Two: Water Lilies (The Cloud)"
7. "Antarctica Suite, Part Two: The Empress"

== Personnel ==
- Richie Beirach – piano
