= Pendulum (Dave Liebman album) =

Live album by David Liebman Quintet
- Released: 1979
- Recorded: February 4 and 5, 1978
- Venues: Village Vanguard, NYC
- Genre: Jazz
- Length: 42:59
- Labels: Artists House; AH 8
- Producer: John Snyder

David Liebman chronology
Light'n Up, Please! (1976)	Pendulum (1979)	Omerta (1978)

Pendulum is a live album by saxophonist David Liebman which was recorded at the Village Vanguard in early 1978 and originally released on the Artists House label. In 2008 the album was rereleased by Mosaic Records as part of a 3 CD box set with eight additional unreleased recordings from the same performances.

== Reception ==
Professional ratings
Review scores
Source	Rating
AllMusic	4/5 stars
All About Jazz	4.5/5 stars
DownBeat	4.5/5 stars

The AllMusic review by David R. Adler stated, " this album is an obscure classic of hard-hitting, post-bop New York jazz ... A collector's item, and a terrific listen as well." John Kelman's review of the rereleased box set on All About Jazz noted "Mosaic Select 32: Pendulum Live at the Village Vanguard may be thirty years old, but it remains one of the most exciting releases of 2008".

== Track listing ==
Disc one

1. "Pendulum" (Richard Beirach) – 18:18
2. "Picadilly Lilly" (David Liebman) – 7:27
3. "Footprints" (Wayne Shorter) – 17:14

Disc two Additional tracks on 2008 box set

1. "There Is No Greater Love" (Isham Jones, Marty Symes) – 17:48
2. "Solar" (Miles Davis) – 20:23
3. "Picadilly Lilly" (Liebman) – 9:20
4. "Night and Day" (Cole Porter) – 22:10

Disc three Additional tracks on 2008 box set

1. "Blue Bossa" (Kenny Dorham) – 17:18
2. "Well, You Needn't" (Thelonious Monk) – 18:40
3. "Bonnie's Blue" (Liebman) – 17:29
4. "Impressions" (John Coltrane) – 22:49

== Personnel ==
- David Liebman – tenor saxophone, soprano saxophone
- Randy Brecker – trumpet
- Richie Beirach – piano
- Frank Tusa – bass
- Al Foster – drums
