= Lookout Farm (album) =

Studio album by Dave Liebman
- Released: 1974
- Recorded: October 10–11, 1973
- Studio: Generation Sound Studios; New York City
- Genre: Jazz fusion, post-bop
- Length: 46:53
- Label: ECM 1039
- Producer: Manfred Eicher

Dave Liebman chronology
First Visit (1973)	Lookout Farm (1974)	Drum Ode (1974)

Lookout Farm is an album by American jazz saxophonist Dave Liebman recorded over two days in October 1973 and released on ECM—his debut for the label. The eponymous quartet "Lookout Farm" features rhythm section Richard Beirach, Frank Tusa, and Jeff Williams, with guest appearances from guitarist John Abercrombie, singer Eleana Sternberg and percussionists Armen Halburian, Don Alias, Badal Roy, and Steve Sattan.

== Background ==
In the liner notes, Liebman said:

Lookout Farm is a new quartet. This is our first album; with the help of friends. The compositions are dedicated to people or experiences I've had. "Pablo's Story" for P. Picasso (with "Andalucia" for Mom); "Sam's Float" is for a water dance; "M.D." for Miles; "Lookout Farm" was where I met Eugene Gregan.

When asked about the album, Liebman noted that "the idea was that each of the four tunes had a different kind of vibe, with each representing an interest of mine at the time... The four tunes on Lookout Farm are the same things I’ve been playing throughout my life."

== Reception ==
The AllMusic review by Michael G. Nastos awarded the album 5 stars, stating, "For saxophonist/flutist David Liebman, the collective septet Lookout Farm earmarked him as an emergent band leader and conceptualist, not to mention top-of-the-heap unabashed improviser, especially on the soprano... Lookout Farm's sheer democracy in motion, for progressive modern jazz in a fusion era, defined how far artistically a group could go while retaining a distinct identity... This one-of-a-kind band and recording set a high-water mark for far too few bands, even unto itself, to follow. This is worth searching for and savoring."

Professional ratings
Review scores
Source	Rating
AllMusic	5/5 stars
The Rolling Stone Jazz Record Guide	5/5 stars

== Track listing ==
All compositions by Dave Liebman - Published by Lieb Stone Music

1. "Pablo's Story" – 14:09
2. "Sam's Float" – 8:50
3. "M.D./Lookout Farm" – 23:54

== Personnel ==
=== Lookout Farm ===
- Dave Liebman – soprano saxophone, tenor saxophone, alto flute
- Richard Beirach – piano, electric piano
- Frank Tusa – bass, electric bass
- Jeff Williams – drums

=== Guests ===
- John Abercrombie – guitar
- Armen Halburian – percussion
- Don Alias – conga, bongos
- Badal Roy – tabla
- Steve Sattan – cowbell, tambourine
- Eleana Sternberg – vocals
