= Lisa Sokolov =

American singer (born 1954)

- Born: September 24, 1954 (age 72); Manhasset, New York, U.S.
- Genres: Vocal jazz, avant-garde jazz
- Occupation: Singer
- Instruments: Vocals, piano
- Label: Laughing Horse
- Website: www.lisasokolov.com

Lisa Sokolov (born September 24, 1954) is an American jazz singer, known for her improvisational style and wide vocal range.

== Early life and education ==
Sokolov was born in Manhasset, New York in 1954 to Bernard and Helen Sokolov and was raised in nearby Roslyn. She was exposed to jazz from a young age through her father, who played stride piano and listened to Art Tatum, Mabel Mercer, and Stan Getz. She began singing from a young age and for many years studied piano.

In 1972 she attended Bennington College, where she studied with musicians Milford Graves, Bill Dixon, Jimmy Lyons, voice teacher Frank Baker, and composers Vivian Fine and Louis Calabro. While in college, she was exposed to vocalists Betty Carter and Meredith Monk, both of whom are considered influences for Sokolov's own style. She was a double major in music/black music and minored in philosophy. While at Bennington she became interested in avant-garde jazz, which she incorporated into her vocal style.

== Music career ==
After graduating from Bennington College in 1976, Sokolov moved to New York City and subsequently spent several months in Paris, France before returning to the U.S. to pursue graduate work in music therapy. She continued to sing, using her work in music therapy to supplement her performing career. In New York City, Sokolov met vocalist Jeanne Lee, through whom she met and began her decades long collaborations with bassist William Parker. She was part of the Studio Henry scene, a cooperative performance space, with musicians John Zorn, Wayne Horvitz, Robin Holcomb, Elliott Sharp, and Dave Sewelson. She continued to sing and compose while she worked as a music therapist and began teaching in NYU's graduate music department.

In 1993, she released her debut album, angel Rodeo, which featured notable Bangladeshi tabla player Badal Roy. The album, along with all albums by Sokolov, featured a mix of original compositions and re-interpreted standards from a variety of genres.

She appeared on the album Songs (2002) by percussionist Gerry Hemingway, with Ellery Eskelin, Herb Robertson, Kermit Driscoll, James Emery, John Butcher, Thomas Lehn, and Wolter Wierbos. In 2001, she was featured on William Parker's Song Cycle.

In 2004, she released her third album, Presence. With Presence, Sokolov included original compositions and songs by Don Covay, Cole Porter, and Rodgers and Hammerstein.

Sokolov's A Quiet Thing featured a range of material: original compositions, jazz standards, Jewish liturgy, and some of her poetry. On the song "Ol' Man River," Sokolov included a tribute to some of her influences, including Nina Simone and Laura Nyro.

Sokolov has worked with Cecil Taylor, Robin Holcomb, Rahn Burton, Rashid Ali, Badal Roy, Jeanne Lee, Jimmy Lyons, Wayne Horvitz, Hilton Ruiz, Irène Schweizer, Butch Morris, "Blue" Gene Tyranny, Jim McNeely, and Cameron Brown.

Notable venues at which she has performed include the Lincoln Center for the Performing Arts in New York City and the Opéra Nouvel in France.

== Teaching and music therapy ==
Since 1981, she has taught at the Experimental Theater Wing at the Tisch School of the Arts, which is part of New York University. Embodied VoiceWork is used in arts education and human potential work as well as music therapy and mind/body medical practice. She is recognized in the music therapy world as a contributor to the applications of the voice to human potential. In January 2020, Sokolov's book Embodied VoiceWork: Beyond Singingwas published by Barcelona Publishers.

== Critical reception ==
Angel Rodeo received praise in the Allmusic Guide and Cadence Magazine, the latter giving the album the Editor's Choice Best CD of 1993 and calling it "most adventurous" and "never less than excellent."

Lazy Afternoon received three out of four stars in a Los Angeles Times review, and the critic stated that Sokolov "stretches the envelope of jazz singing" and is "courageously adventurous."

Presence received a five-star "masterpiece" rating from Down Beat and was named best CD of 2004. The received a four-star rating from Scott Yanow of Allmusic. The Down Beat review stated: "as far removed stylistically from the reigning royalty of female jazz vocalists as John Coltrane is from Grover Washington, Lisa Sokolov fills every moment of Presence with just that." The review called the album "ecstatic", "compelling" "masterful," and "life affirming."

Donald Elfman of AllAboutJazz stated that Sokolov "delves into the magical possibilities of the voice and the beauty and mystery of words...A Quiet Thing extends the power of her earlier recordings, continuing her progression towards the majestic and ecstatic 'silence' of the universe."

== Discography ==
- Angel Rodeo (Laughing Horse, 1993)
- Lazy Afternoon (Laughing Horse, 1999)
- Presence (Laughing Horse, 2003)
- A Quiet Thing (Laughing Horse, 2008)

=== As guest ===
- Gerry Hemingway, Songs (Between the Lines, 2002)
- William Parker, Sunrise in the Tone World (Aum Fidelity, 1997)
- William Parker, Song Cycle (Boxholder, 2001)
- William Parker, Stan's Hat Flapping in the Wind (Centering, 2016)

== Bibliography ==
- “Giving Birth to Sound: Women in Creative Music” Buddy's Knife JazzEdition, Koln Germany 2015 Sokolov chapter “Music as Language of the Soul”
- “Embodied Voicework; The Movement towards Wholeness in the Musical Field of Play”, a chapter included in The Jungian Odyssey; Creativity and Chaos; Spring Journal Books
- Silent Solos, A poetry anthology published by Buddy's Knife Contributor
- “Music, the Breath and Health; Advances in Integrative Music Therapy” Chapter“ Opening to Breath” 2009 Satchnote Press
- Improvisational Models of Music Therapy Chapter 27 The Sokolov Model Ken Bruscia Editor Charles Thomas Publisher 1987
- Embodied VoiceWork: Beyond Singing Barcelona Publishers 2020
