= The Opal Heart =

Studio album by David Liebman Quartet featuring Mike Nock
- Released: 1979
- Recorded: February 21–22, 1979
- Studio: Earth Media, Sydney, Australia
- Genre: Jazz
- Length: 42:09
- Label: 44; 6357 726
- Producer: Horst Liepolt

David Liebman chronology
Omerta (1978)	The Opal Heart (1979)	Doin' It Again (1979)

The Opal Heart is an album by saxophonist David Liebman which was recorded in Australia in 1979 and originally released on the Australian label, 44 Records, before being rereleased in the US on Inner City then on CD by the German-based Enja label in 1996.

Professional ratings
Review scores
Source	Rating
AllMusic	3/5 stars

== Track listing ==
All compositions by David Liebman except where noted

1. "Sunburst" (Ron McClure) – 9:04
2. "Port Ligat" – 7:59
3. "The Opal Hearted Aborigine" – 6:07
4. "I Concentrate on You" (Cole Porter) – 7:47
5. "Star Crossed Lovers" (Duke Ellington, Billy Strayhorn) – 4:04
6. "Down Under" (McClure) – 7:08

== Personnel ==
- David Liebman – tenor saxophone, soprano saxophone
- Mike Nock – piano
- Ron McClure – bass
- Ed Soph – drums
