= The Listener (album) =

Live album by Jeff Willams
- Released: June 4, 2013
- Recorded: May 7, 2012
- Venue: Vortex Jazz Club
- Genre: Jazz
- Label: Whirlwind
- Producer: Jeff Williams

Jeff Willams chronology
Another Time (2011)	The Listener (2013)

The Listener is an album by jazz drummer Jeff Willams, an American expatriate in England. The album was released on 4 June 4, 2013 by Whirlwind Recordings.

== Track list ==
1. Beer and Water
2. Borderline
3. She Can't Be a Spy
4. Fez
5. Lament
6. Scrunge/Search Me
7. Slew Footed
8. Dedicated to You

== Personnel ==
- Jeff Willams – drums
- Duane Eubanks – trumpet
- John O' Gallagher – alto saxophone
- John Hébert – double bass
