= Michael Eckroth =

American jazz pianist, arranger, and composer

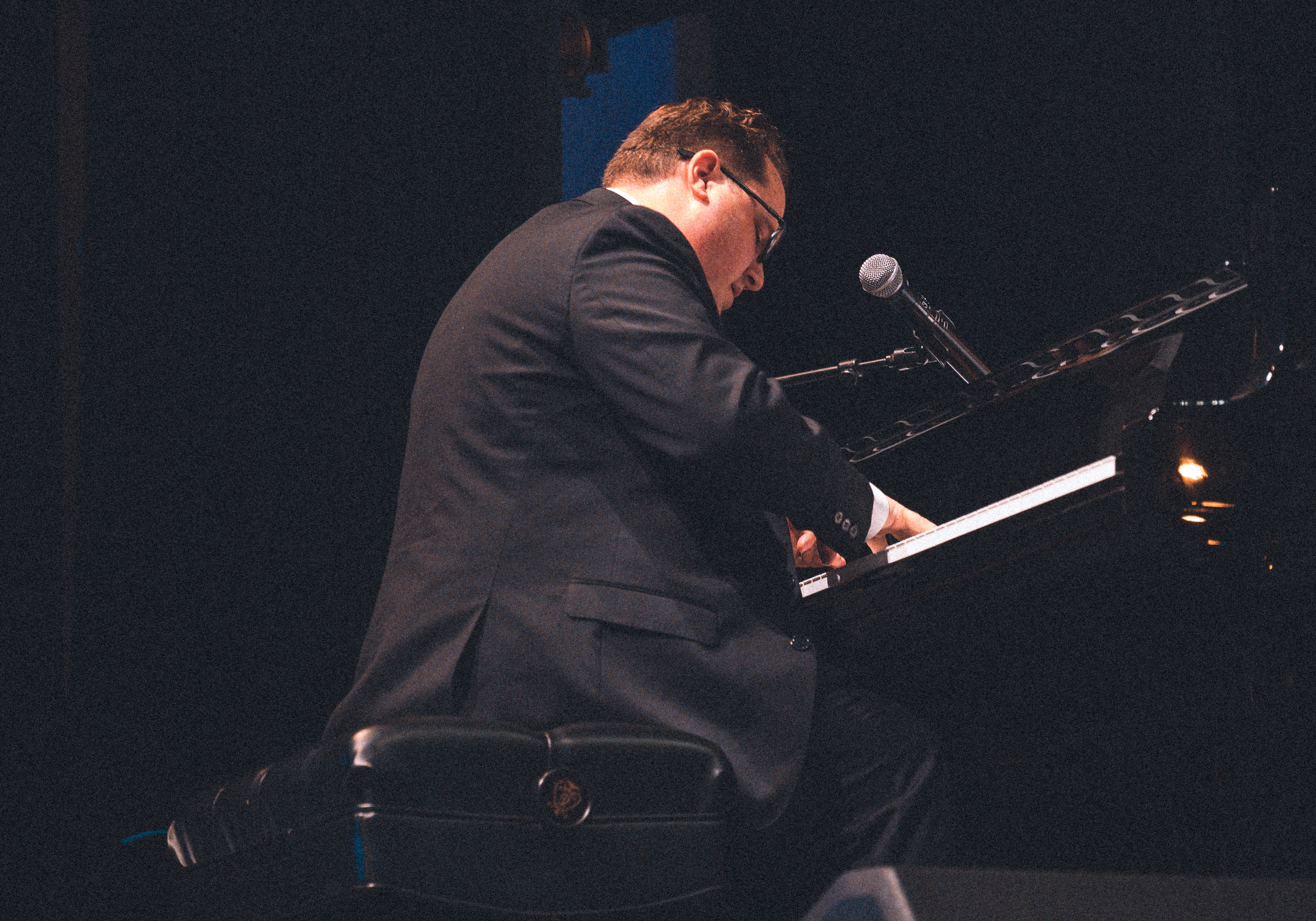
- Michael Eckroth performing in 2019

Background information
- Origin: Phoenix, Arizona, United States
- Genres: Jazz; Latin jazz
- Occupations: Musician, pianist, arranger
- Instruments: Piano, keyboards, vocals
- Years active: 1995–present
- Labels: Daptone Records, SteepleChase Records, Positone Records
- Member of: Orquesta Akokán
- Website: www.mikeeckroth.com

Michael Eckroth is an American jazz pianist, arranger, and composer from Phoenix, Arizona, particularly known for his work in Latin jazz. He was a member of jazz-rock guitarist John Scofield's New Quartet from 2010-2012. Currently, he is the co-writer, arranger, and pianist for Cuban and American mambo big band Orquesta Akokán, whose self-titled debut album from Daptone Records was nominated in the 61st Annual Grammy Awards.

== Early life and education ==
Michael Eckroth was raised in Phoenix, Arizona. He is from a musical family and is the brother of keyboardist Rachel Eckroth.

He formally studied jazz throughout his career, receiving his B.A. at the University of Arizona and receiving his M.A. at the University of Nevada, Las Vegas. He began pursuing his Ph.D. at New York University in 2006. During this time, he was the recipient of the Díaz-Ayala Library Travel Grant at Florida International University under a U.S. Department of Education Title VI grant in 2012 to conduct research on Cuban music. He later completed his Ph.D. in 2016, writing his dissertation on Cuban piano solos of the 1940s.

== Career ==
While studying at New York University, Eckroth became involved in a number of musical projects as a pianist. While Eckroth was a student in an ensemble class led by jazz-rock guitarist John Scofield, Scofield invited Eckroth to join his New Quartet with drummer Bill Stewart and bassist Ben Street from 2010-2012. Eckroth appears in the live concert DVD of the group's 2010 concert in Paris, France at jazz club New Morning.

Eckroth formed the Latin vocal trio La Voz de Tres with Chilean vocalist Natalia Bernal and guitarist Jason Ennis in 2008. The group released their self-titled debut album in 2010 and their second album Sueños y Delirios in 2015. Around this time, Eckroth also performed with jazz multi-instrumentalist Paul McCandless and Brazilian guitarist Aliéksey Vianna. The trio released a live concert DVD from Brazil in 2009 titled Ebano. Additionally, Eckroth appeared on Morrie Louden's album Time Piece, which featured singer Gretchen Parlato and guitarist Lionel Loueke.

In 2015, Eckroth released a solo album of Cuban music titled Piano and Rhythm. Later in 2016, Eckroth released a duo album with bassist Ron McClure titled Hello Stars. Eckroth appeared on Ron McClure's Trio album Hope and Knowledge as well. Eckroth also appeared on saxophonist Dan Pratt's Quartet album Hymn for the Happy Man with bassist Christian McBride and drummer Greg Hutchinson.

Starting in 2016, Eckroth formed the Cuban and American mambo big band Orquesta Akokán as its co-writer, arranger, and pianist with singer José "Pepito" Gómez and composer Jacob Plasse. The group is a collaboration of musicians from Cuba and the United States that formed after the normalization of relations between the two countries in 2014. The band recorded their debut album in Havana, Cuba at the historic EGREM state-run Areíto Studios, where notable musicians like Buena Vista Social Club, Celia Cruz, Benny Moré, and Frank Sinatra have recorded. The group's debut album was released by Daptone Records in 2018, and it was the record label's first all Spanish-language recording. The album was nominated for the 61st Annual Grammy Awards in the "Best Tropical Latin Album" category.

Eckroth also served as the arranger and pianist for Calle Mambo Project's 2018 album See The Light. He is currently part of the jazz faculty at Dartmouth College.

== Awards and honors ==
2019: Nominated in the 61st Annual Grammy Awards in the "Best Tropical Latin Album" category for the self-titled debut album by Orquesta Akokán.

== Selected discography ==
=== As leader/co-leader/arranger ===
==== Orquesta Akokán ====
- Orquesta Akokán (2018)
- 16 Rayos (2021)

==== Michael Eckroth ====
- Piano and Rhythm (2015)
- Sombrío (2010)

==== Ron McClure & Michael Eckroth ====
- Hello Stars (2016)

==== La Voz de Tres ====
- Sueños y Delirios (2015)
- La Voz de Tres (2010)

==== Calle Mambo Project ====
- See The Light (2018)

==== DEF Trio ====
- Bushwick'd (2014)

=== As a band member/session artist ===
- Ron McClure: Hope and Knowledge (2017)
- Dan Pratt Quartet (with Christian McBride and Greg Hutchinson): Hymn for the Happy Man (2016)
- Ron McClure: Crunch Time (2012)
- Ron McClure: Dedication (2011)
- John Scofield New Quartet: New Morning: The Paris Concert (DVD) (2010)
- Paul McCandless and Aliéksey Vianna: Ebano (DVD) (2009)
- Morrie Louden (with Gretchen Parlato and Lionel Loueke): Time Piece (2007)
