= Quest (band) =

American jazz band

- Genres: Jazz, Free jazz
- Years active: 1981–present
- Labels: Storyville, Palo Alto, HatOLOGY, Enja
- Members: Dave Liebman; Richie Beirach; Ron McClure; Billy Hart
- Past members: George Mraz; Al Foster

Quest is an American jazz band, which includes saxophonist Dave Liebman, pianist Richie Beirach, bassist Ron McClure, and drummer Billy Hart. The original band line-up included bassists George Mraz and drummer Al Foster. They were featured on the group's first album only; all subsequent recordings feature the Liebman/Beirach/McClure/Hart line-up.

== Discography ==
- 1981: Quest (Trio [Japan]; Palo Alto)
- 1987: Quest II (Storyville)
- 1987: Quest III: Midpoint – Live at Montmartre (Storyville)
- 1988: N.Y. Nites: Standards (Storyville)
- 1988: Natural Selection (Evidence)
- 1990: Of One Mind (CMP)
- 2007: Redemption: Quest Live in Europe (HatOLOGY)
- 2010: Re-Dial: Live in Hamburg (Outnote)
- 2010: Searching for the New Sound of Be-Bop (Storyville) (Compiles three complete previously released albums: Quest II, Quest III: Midpoint, and Double Edge, a Liebman/Beirach duo recording.)
- 2013: Live in Paris 2010 (Vaju Prod.) (download only; no CD release)
- 2013: Circular Dreaming: Quest Plays the Music of Miles' 60's (Enja)
