= Duofel =

Duofel was a Brazilian acoustic guitar duo considered one of the best in the country. Formed by Fernando Melo and Luiz Bueno, the duo emerged in São Paulo in 1977 and released several works. In 1994, the duo won the Sharp Award for Best Instrumental Music for the track "Do outro lado do oceano". Also in 1994, they collaborated with the tabla player Badal Roy and recorded the album Encontro das Águas together.

The group used classical guitar, steel-string acoustic guitar, and twelve-string guitar.

The duo announced their split on July 31, 2020, during a YouTube-streamed performance titled The End, following a hiatus of nearly six months due to the COVID-19 pandemic.
