= Leaving (album) =

Studio album by Richard Beirach and Jeremy Steig
- Released: 1976
- Recorded: August 17 & 18, 1976
- Studio: New York City, NY
- Genre: Jazz
- Length: 32:28
- Label: Trio/Storyville; PAP-9074/STCD 4149
- Producer: David Baker, Richard Beirach

Jeremy Steig chronology
Temple of Birth (1975)	Leaving (1976)	Outlaws (1976)

Richard Beirach chronology
Zal (1976)	Leaving (1976)	Hubris (1977)

Leaving is an album of duets by pianist Richard Beirach and flautist Jeremy Steig recorded in 1976 and originally released on the Japanese Trio label before being rereleased on the Danish Storyville label on CD in 1988.

== Reception ==
Professional ratings
Review scores
Source	Rating
AllMusic	3/5 stars

The AllMusic review by Scott Yanow stated, "In general the music is peaceful with some dissonances. Steig provides long tones while Beirach creates light rhythmic patterns and, although it does not entirely stay at the same emotional level, the music is generally quite dry and uneventful".

== Track listing ==
All compositions by Richard Bierach except where noted

1. "Angelo" − 3:11
2. "Waterlillies" (Richard Beirach, Jeremy Steig) − 2:46
3. "Liebsong" − 3:04
4. "The Unforeseen" (Beirach, Steig) − 3:28
5. "Mitsuku" − 5:03
6. "Within a Song" − 2:43
7. "Amethyst" − 3:32
8. "Orphan" (Beirach, Steig) − 2:25
9. "Splivy" (Beirach, Steig) − 1:20
10. "Leaving" − 4:56

== Personnel ==
- Richard Beirach − piano
- Jeremy Steig – alto flute, soprano flute, bass flute, piccolo
