= Sweet Hands =

Studio album by David Liebman
- Released: 1975
- Recorded: July 25, 27, 29 and 30, 1975
- Studio: Kendun Recorders, Burbank, CA
- Genre: Jazz
- Length: 44:43
- Label: A&M/Horizon; SP-702
- Producer: Ed Michel

David Liebman chronology
Drum Ode (1974)	Sweet Hands (1975)	Forgotten Fantasies (1975)

Sweet Hands is an album by saxophonist David Liebman which was recorded in California in 1975 and released on the Horizon label.

== Reception ==
Professional ratings
Review scores
Source	Rating
AllMusic	2.5/5 stars

The AllMusic review by Richard S. Ginell stated, "The influence of India upon jazz had not been spent entirely when Dave Liebman and Lookout Farm recorded the first of his Horizon albums, which pursues the East-meets-West direction of his former employer Miles Davis, but without the latter's dramatic thrust ... Fascinating music, if not always convincing."

== Track listing ==
All compositions by David Liebman except where noted

1. "Dr. Faustus" – 10:49
2. "Dark Lady" (Ritchie Bierach) – 7:45
3. "Sweet Hand Roy" (David Liebman, Badal Roy) – 4:10
4. "Ashirbad" (Roy) – 1:52
5. "Within You Without You" (George Harrison) – 10:21
6. "Napanoch" – 5:31
7. "Leane" – 4:15

== Personnel ==
- David Liebman – tenor saxophone, soprano saxophone, alto flute, wind chimes
- Richie Beirach – piano, electric piano, clavinet, bell tree, wind chimes (tracks 1–3, 5 & 6)
- John Abercrombie – electric guitar, acoustic guitar (tracks 1–3 & 7)
- Frank Tusa – bass, electric bass (tracks 1–6)
- Charlie Haden – bass (tracks 3–5)
- Jeff Williams – drums (tracks 1–3, 6 & 7)
- Don Alias – congas, tambourine, bells, shaker, finger cymbals
- Badal Roy – table, ektar, vocals (tracks 2–5)
- Gita Roy – tamboura (tracks 4 & 5)
- Arooj Lazewal – sitar (tracks 4 & 5)
