= Endorfun =

1995 video game

- Developer: Onesong Partners
- Publisher: Time Warner Interactive
- Designer: Michael Jai Feinberg
- Platforms: Windows, Macintosh, Super Famicom, PlayStation
- Release: October 17, 1995
- Genre: Puzzle
- Mode: Single player

Endorfun is a 1995 puzzle video game developed by Onesong Partners and published by Time Warner Interactive for Microsoft Windows and Macintosh. It was later released in Japan under the title Cu-On-Pa for the Super Famicom and PlayStation. A Nintendo 64 version was announced (again under the title Cu-On-Pa) but never released. The game achieved notoriety for the extensive use of spoken "positive affirmations" on its soundtrack.

== Gameplay ==
The player controls a small cube, referred to as a light body, by using the keyboard or mouse. The light body rolls along a grid (the unified field) collecting life force tiles (coloured tiles with a texture matching that of the cube) by rolling the cube over them such that the top face of the cube matches the colour of the tile. Coloured tiles of varying types appear randomly on the playing surface, but can be eliminated in the same manner as life force tiles.

Games are divided into multiple levels, each of which has a set time limit and a life force target. If a player collects the target amount of life force play proceeds to the next level. If the timer expires or the light body is unable to move (all adjacent grid spaces are blocked by coloured tiles) then the game is over.

There are three different modes of play in Endorfun, each with different goals:

1. Longevity: play for the longest possible time
2. Abundance: pass through a set number of levels before time runs out
3. Quickening: as Abundance, but levels become progressively faster and more difficult

== Soundtrack ==
Endorfun's soundtrack is composed of a large number of short, looped song segments. Each segment is approximately 5 seconds long, with different segments strung together to provide longer, varied soundtracks for each level.

Each level's soundtrack contains messages oriented towards peace, well-being, love, and happiness.

== Subliminal messages ==
Endorfun features phrases described by the press at the time of its release as "subliminal messages", which are audibly spoken through speakers or headphones to the player during gameplay. These messages, dubbed "positive affirmations" by the game's publisher, take the form of phrases intended to convey positive feelings and moods such as body positivity and optimism, such as "I am joyful", "I am powerful" and "I am at peace". They became immediately controversial due to their nature and were criticized by the press and a professor at the University of Michigan, who raised concerns that these messages, though ostensibly positive, could have certain unintended consequences.

Time Warner stated that all of the messages included in the game were only intended "to uplift the heart and mind of its users" and that an exhaustive list of all such phrases was printed on the game's retail box, so that consumers buying knew exactly what they would be exposed to. The "subliminal" phrases were also optional and can be disabled by the player through the game's sound menu, though doing so disables music (but not other sounds) as well. Instructions for doing so were included in the game's main help file.

== Reception ==
Reception

Review scores
Publication	Score
Next Generation	3/5
Computer Game Review	90/88/88
Dengeki PlayStation	60/100, 50/100

Reviewing the Macintosh version, a Next Generation critic lauded the gameplay, saying it "soon becomes a Zen sort of experience in the same way that Tetris sometimes does". He added that the "abstract symphony of mesmerising graphics, colorful motion, and swelling, jazzy background tunes soon puts the player in that autopilot gaming state where complex movement sequences and on-the-fly strategies becomes second nature and all is forgotten but the rhythm." Despite this, he gave it only three out of five stars. Computer Game Review praised Endorfun for "addictive game play, cool visual effects and some good music."

Game review site GameSpot described it as a "challenging, if repetitive game", though adding that the game's graphics and subliminal messages made it into a "far more interesting fare", summing it up as a "challenging, unique puzzle game that is pleasant to look at and listen to". The author opined that the phrases included within the game ranged from ones he found "harmonious" (such as "I love the world and the world loves me") to ones he found "scary" (such as "It's OK for me to have everything I want").
