= If They Only Knew (Dave Liebman album) =

Studio album by David Liebman Quintet
- Released: 1981
- Recorded: July 14, 1980
- Studio: Fendel Sound Studio, Loenen Aan De Vecht, Netherlands
- Genre: Jazz
- Length: 44:06
- Label: Timeless; SJP 151
- Producer: David Liebman

David Liebman chronology
Lieb: Close Up (1979)	If They Only Knew (1981)	Memories, Dreams and Reflections (1981-82)

If They Only Knew is an album by saxophonist David Liebman which was recorded in the Netherlands in 1980 and released on the Dutch Timeless label.

== Reception ==
Professional ratings
Review scores
Source	Rating
AllMusic	4/5 stars

The AllMusic review by Richard S. Ginell stated, "this is a thoughtful, often burning quintet session carooming off the bumpers of post-bop, jazz-rock, and the avant-garde."

== Track listing ==
All compositions by David Liebman except where noted

1. "If They Only Knew" – 8:47
2. "Capistrano" (John Scofield) – 8:28
3. "Moontide" – 5:37
4. "Reunion" (Ron McClure) – 7:14
5. "Autumn in New York" (Vernon Duke) – 5:07
6. "Move On Some" – 9:07

== Personnel ==
- David Liebman – tenor saxophone, soprano saxophone
- Terumasa Hino – trumpet, flugelhorn
- John Scofield – guitar
- Ron McClure – double bass
- Adam Nussbaum – drums
