= Ron McClure =

American jazz bassist (born 1941)

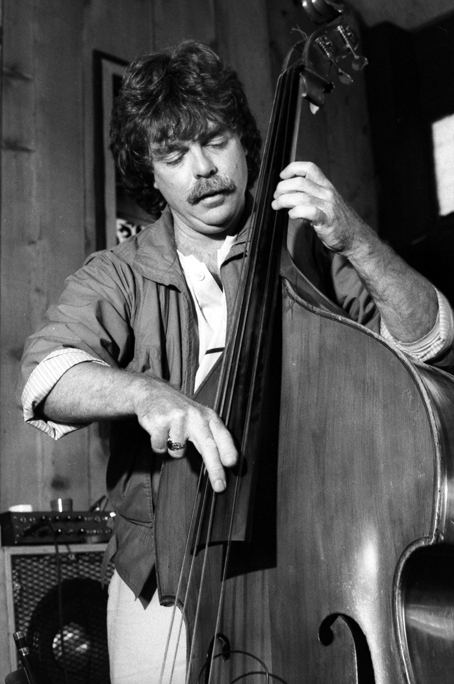
- McClure at the Bach Dancing & Dynamite Society, Half Moon Bay, California, in 1987

Background information
- Born: November 22, 1941 (age 84); New Haven, Connecticut, U.S.
- Genres: Jazz, jazz rock
- Occupations: Musician, composer, educator
- Instrument: Bass
- Years active: 1965–present
- Labels: Bellaphon, Ken, Steeplechase
- Website: www.ronmcclure.com

Ron McClure (born November 22, 1941) is an American jazz bassist.

== Early life ==
McClure was born in New Haven, Connecticut, United States. He started on piano at age five, and later played accordion and bass. McClure studied privately with Joseph Iadone and, later, with Hall Overton and Don Sebesky. McClure attended the Hartt School of Music, graduating in 1963.

== Later life and career ==
McClure worked in the Buddy Rich Sextet in 1963. He then joined Maynard Ferguson's big band and, afterwards, Herbie Mann in 1964; and then assumed the bass chair in the Wynton Kelly Trio vacated by Paul Chambers in 1965 (playing behind guitarist Wes Montgomery).

From 1966 to 1969, he was a member of Charles Lloyd's "classic quartet" with pianist Keith Jarrett and drummer Jack DeJohnette, which was voted "Group of the Year" in 1967 by Downbeat magazine.

In 1970, with pianist-composer Mike Nock, drummer Eddie Marshall and violinist Michael White, he co-founded the jazz-rock group, the Fourth Way. He also participated in Carla Bley's album, Escalator over the Hill, and worked with saxophonist Joe Henderson.

In April and May 1972, while McClure was teaching at Berklee College of Music, he worked three jobs lasting a total of four weeks as the bassist in the Thelonious Monk Quartet.

In October 1973, McClure recorded with Vince Guaraldi and drummer Mike Clark for recording sessions at Wally Heider Studios in San Francisco. Different takes of "Autumn Leaves" from the sessions were later issued on North Beach (2006) and It's a Mystery, Charlie Brown: Original Soundtrack Recording (2026).

In 1974, McClure joined Blood, Sweat & Tears, staying until 1975 and performing on three albums: Mirror Image, New City and In Concert. In 1976, McClure's composition “No Show” was nominated for a Grammy Award for Best Arrangement, Instrumental or A Cappella.

In the 1980s, he joined Quest, led by saxophonist Dave Liebman, which also included drummer Billy Hart and pianist Richie Beirach. He also recorded a duo album with pianist Michel Petrucciani. McClure's major engagements in the 1990s through the early 2000s were with Lee Konitz, and then with the reassembled Quest.

His solo output include the contributions of John Scofield, John Abercrombie, Vic Juris, Paul Bley, Michael Eckroth, Richie Beirach, and Randy Brecker.

== Discography ==
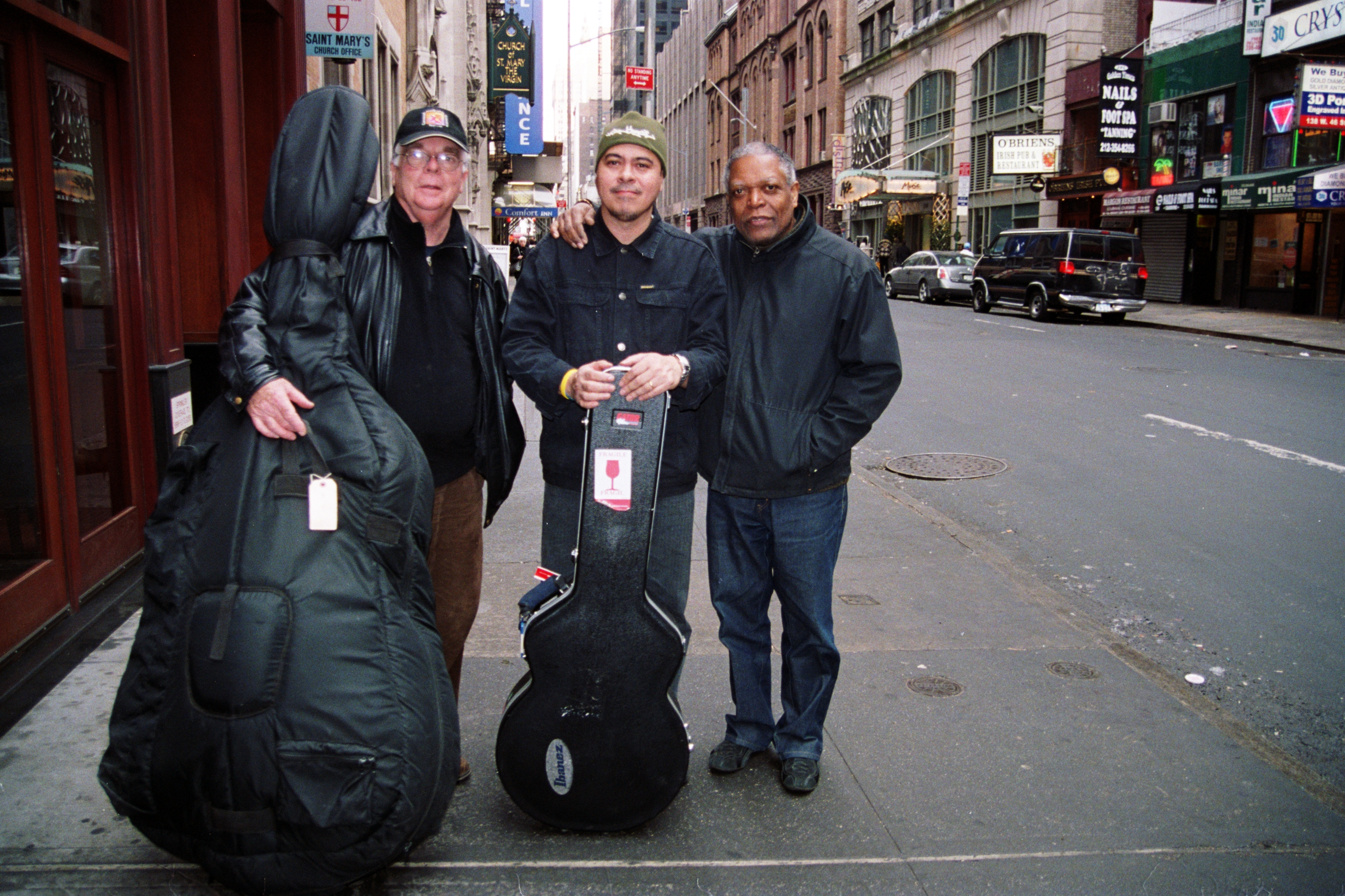
Ron McClure (left) with guitarist Johnny Alegre (center) and drummer Billy Hart (right) in Midtown, Manhattan, at 151 West 46th Street, between Sixth and Seventh Avenues. The photo was taken in 2009, when they recorded Johnny Alegre 3 for MCA.

=== As leader/co-leader ===
- Home Base (Ode [New Zealand], 1979)
- Descendants (Ken Music [Japan], 1980)
- Cold Blues (OWL, 1985) with Michel Petrucciani
- Yesterday's Tomorrow (EPC/European Music Productions, 1989) with John Abercrombie, Aldo Romano
- McJolt (SteepleChase, 1990) with John Abercrombie
- Never Forget (SteepleChase, 1990) with Eddie Henderson, Vincent Herring
- Inspiration (Ken Music [Japan], 1991)
- Tonite Only (SteepleChase, 1991) with John Abercrombie
- Sunburst (SteepleChase, 1992)
- Inner Account (SteepleChase, 1993)
- Never Always (SteepleChase, 1995)
- Concrete Canyon (SteepleChase, 1996)
- Pink Cloud (Naxos Jazz, 1997)
- Closer to Your Tears (SteepleChase, 1997)
- Dream Team (SteepleChase, 1998)
- Double Triangle (Naxos Jazz, 1999)
- Match Point (SteepleChase, 2002)
- Age of Peace (SteepleChase, 2003)
- Soft Hands (SteepleChase, 2007)
- Wonderland (SteepleChase, 2008) with Harold Danko
- New Moon (SteepleChase, 2009)
- Dedication (SteepleChase, 2011)
- Crunch Time (SteepleChase, 2012)
- Ready or Not (SteepleChase, 2013)
- Hello Stars (McJolt Records, 2016)
- Hope & Knowledge (McJolt Records, 2018)
- Lucky Sunday (SteepleChase, 2019)
- NightQuest (SteepleChase, 2022)

=== As sideman ===
With Joe Henderson

- If You're Not Part of the Solution, You're Part of the Problem (Milestone, 1970)
- In Pursuit of Blackness (Milestone, 1971)
- Jazz Patterns (Everest, 1982) – rec.1970

With Lee Konitz

- Zounds (Soul Note, 1990)
- It's You (SteepleChase, 1996)
- Dig-It (SteepleChase, 1999) with Ted Brown

With David Liebman

- The Opal Heart (44, 1979)
- Doin' It Again (Timeless, 1980) – rec.1979
- If They Only Knew (Timeless, 1981) – rec.1980

With Charles Lloyd

- Love-In (Atlantic, 1967)
- Journey Within (Atlantic, 1967)
- Charles Lloyd in the Soviet Union (Atlantic, 1970)
- Soundtrack (Atlantic, 1969)

With Karlheinz Miklin

- Next Page (SOS-Music [Austria], 1991)
- Decisions (SOS-Music, 1993)
- Last Waltz (Acoustic Music, 1997)
- From Here to There (TCB, 2002)
- In Between (Extraplatte, 2005) – rec.2002

With Jarmo Savolainen

- First Sight (Timeless, 1992)
- True Image (A-Records, 1995)

With others

- Johnny Alegre, Johnny Alegre 3 (MCA Music [Philippines], 2009)
- Burak Bedikyan, Leap of Faith (SteepleChase, 2015)
- Carla Bley, Escalator over the Hill (JCOA, 1971)
- Paul Bley, The Nearness of You (SteepleChase, 1989)
- George Cables, Quiet Fire (SteepleChase, 1994)
- Stanley Cowell, Sienna (SteepleChase, 1989)
- Don Friedman, Almost Everything (SteepleChase, 1995)
- Wynton Kelly Trio, Full View (Milestone, 1968)
- The Pointer Sisters, The Pointer Sisters (Blue Thumb, 1973)
- Julian Priester, Love, Love (ECM, 1973)
- George Russell, Live in an American Time Spiral (Soul Note, 1983)
- James Spaulding, The Smile of the Snake (HighNote, 1997)
- Dave Stryker, Strike Zone (SteepleChase, 1991)
