= Badal Roy =

Indian tabla player (1939–2022)

Badal Roy বাদল রায়
- Born: Amarendra Roy Chowdhury; 16 October 1939
- Origin: New York City
- Died: 18 January 2022 (aged 82) Wilmington, Delaware, U.S.
- Genres: Jazz fusion, world music
- Occupation: Tabla maestro
- Instrument: Tabla
- Years active: 1971–2016

Badal Roy (Bengali: বাদল রায়; born Amarendra Roy Chowdhury; 16 October 1939 – 18 January 2022) was an Indian tabla player, percussionist, and recording artist known for his work in jazz, world music, and experimental music.

== Biography ==
Roy was born Amarendra Roy Chowdhury on 16 October 1939, into a Hindu family in a predominantly Muslim eastern Bengal region in Comilla, British India (which later became East Pakistan, then Bangladesh). His mother, Sova Rani Roy Chowdhury, was a homemaker, while his father, Satyenda Nath Roy Chowdhury was a government official in Eastern Pakistan. The name Badal (meaning "rain," "cloud", or "thunder" in the Bengali language), was given to him by his grandfather after he began crying in the rain as a toddler. He spoke the Bengali, English, Hindi, and Urdu languages.

He was introduced to music, in particular the percussion instrument Tabla, by his uncle. An early inspiration for Roy was American popular music, and he particularly enjoyed the music of artists such as Elvis Presley, Pat Boone, and Nat King Cole. His first exposure to jazz came when he saw a concert by Duke Ellington in Karachi, West Pakistan in 1963.

Roy received a master's degree in statistics. He came to New York City in 1968 to work on a PhD with only eight dollars in his pocket, he began working as a busboy and waiter in various Indian restaurants in the New York area, including Pak Indian Curry House, Taste of India and Raga. He later settled in East Brunswick Township, New Jersey. He later received lessons from Alla Rakha, a tabla player who performed with the sitar player Ravi Shankar and was Zakir Hussain's father.

Roy married Geeta Vashi in 1974. The couple had a son and lived in Wilmington, Delaware. Roy died from COVID-19 in Wilmington, on 18 January 2022, at the age of 82.

== Career ==
When Roy moved to New York, he worked as a waiter in Indian restaurants in the region. At weekends, he performed as a tabla artist accompanying a sitar player at A Taste of India, an Indian restaurant in Greenwich Village in New York. Here, he was spotted by John McLaughlin who asked Roy to accompany him in jam sessions and later to contribute to the album My Goal's Beyond (1971). The album was considered a landmark one in Indian-themed jazz.

Steve Gorn spotted him in a Manhattan restaurant called Raga, eventually attracting the attention of Miles Davis. Davis invited Roy to join his group, and he recorded on Davis's albums On the Corner (1972), Big Fun (1969–72; released 1974), and Get Up with It (1970–74). Roy subsequently performed and recorded with many leading jazz musicians, including Davis, Dave Liebman, Pharoah Sanders, John McLaughlin, Herbie Hancock, Herbie Mann, Pat Metheny, Lester Bowie, Airto Moreira, Charlie Haden, Purna Das Baul, and Ornette Coleman (playing in Coleman's electric band Prime Time). In the 1990s Roy began performing with the Brazilian guitar duo Duofel. He has also collaborated with Ken Wessel and Stomu Takeishi in a fusion trio named Alankar. They currently have one album entitled Daybreak.

Roy has appeared and offered workshops at RhythmFest, the Starwood Festival, and at the SpiritDrum Festival, a special tribute to the late Babatunde Olatunji (co-sponsored by ACE and Musart) with Muruga Booker, Jim Donovan of Rusted Root, Halim El-Dabh, Richie "Shakin'" Nagan, Jeff Rosenbaum and Sikiru Adepoju, among others. He often played with Muruga Booker in the Global Village Ceremonial Band, and with Michael Wolff & Impure Thoughts. In 2004, Roy worked with Richie Havens on the album The Grace of the Sun. In the first half of 2006, Roy travelled to Japan to appear in a tribute for David Baker, his recently deceased recording engineer and friend.

In addition to tabla, Roy also played a variety of percussion instruments including shakers, bells, rain stick, and flexatone. His notable students include Geoffrey Gordon.

In 2008, the album Miles From India, a tribute to Miles Davis on which Roy appeared, received a Grammy nomination.

Helix, his final recording as a member of Michael Moss's Accidental Orchestra, was in 2016.

=== Musical style ===
Unlike many tabla players, Roy does not come from a family of professional musicians and is essentially self-taught, although he studied with his late maternal uncle Dwijendra Chandra Chakraborty as a child, and also studied briefly with Alla Rakha. Consequently, his playing is freer than that of many other tabla players, who adhere more strictly to the tala system of Indian rhythm. He often played a set of up to eight tabla (tuned to different pitches) and two baya at a time, which he played melodically as well as rhythmically.

== Discography ==
=== As leader ===
- 1975 – Ashirbad (Trio Records)
- 1976 – Passing Dreams (Adamo Records and Tapes)
- 1997 – One in the Pocket (Nomad Records)
- 1998 – Daybreak – Alankar
- 2002 – Kolkata Rose (with Geoff Warren)
- 2002 – Raga Roni (with Perry Robinson & Ed Schuller) Geeta

=== With Amit Chatterjee ===
- 1997 – Endless Radiance (Art of the Duo) (Tutu)

=== With Ornette Coleman ===
- 1988 – Jazzbühne Berlin '88 (Repertoire, 1990)
- 1995 – Tone Dialing (Harmelodic/Verve)

=== With Miles Davis ===
- 1974 – Big Fun (2xLP) Columbia Records, 2xCD Columbia (reissued 2000)
- 1974 – Get Up with It (2xLP) Columbia Records 1974 (2xCD Coline 1991, 2000)
- 1988 – Miles Davis: The Columbia Years 1955–1985 (Box set, also 4xCD) Columbia
- 1993 – On the Corner (CD, Album) Columbia Records, (Legacy reissued 2000)
- 1997 – Miles Davis In Concert: Live At Philharmonic Hall, Legacy
- 1998 – Panthalassa: The Music of Miles Davis 1969–1974

=== With Steve Gorn ===
- 1983 – Yantra: Flute and Tabla (reissued 1994) (Music of the World)
- 1982 – Asian Journal (with Nana Vasconcelos & Steve Gorn) (Nomad Records)

=== With Richie Havens ===
- 2004 – Grace of the Sun

=== With Bill Laswell ===
- 1998 – Sacred System: Nagual Site (CD) BMG
- 2000 – Lo. Def Pressure (LP & CD) Sub Rosa

=== With David Liebman ===
- 1974 – Lookout Farm (LP) ECM Records
- 1975 – Passing Dreams (reissued 1998, 2002)
- 1975 – Drum Ode (LP) ECM Records
- 1975 – Sweet Hands Horizon Records
- 1975 – Ashirbad (reissued 2002)
- 1976 – Father Time

=== With Herbie Mann ===
- Sun Belt (Atlantic)

=== With John McLaughlin ===
- 1970 – My Goal's Beyond Knit Classics (Ryko)

=== With Yoko Ono ===
- 1982 – It's Alright (I See Rainbows)
- 1992 – Onobox
- 1992 – Walking on Thin Ice

=== With Mike Richmond ===
- 1988 – Basic Tendencies (with Glen Velez) (Nomad Records)
- 1982 – Asian Journal (with Nana Vasconcelos & Steve Gorn) (Nomad Records)

=== With Perry Robinson ===
- 1978 – Kundalini

=== With Pharoah Sanders ===
- 1972 – Wisdom Through Music (Impulse! Records)
- 1974 – Love in Us All (CD) Universal Music (Japan)

=== With Lonnie Liston Smith ===
- 1973 – Astral Traveling (Flying Dutchman)

=== With Leni Stern ===
- 1991 – Ten Songs
- 1998 – Recollection

=== With Steve Turre ===
- 1992 – Sanctified Shells
- 2000 – In the Valley of Sacred Sound – Harold E. Smith

=== With Barney McAll & Rufus Cappadocia ===
- 2003 – Vivid Jazzhead

=== With Michael Wolff & Impure Thoughts ===
- 2000 – Impure Thoughts Indianola Music
- 2001 – Intoxicate Indianola Music
- 2004 – Dangerous Vision Artemis Records
- 2006 – Love & Destruction Rong Records

=== With other artists ===
- 1967 – Virgo Vibes – Roy Ayers Atlantic (reissued 2002)
- 1979 – Earthquake Island – Jon Hassell (Tomato Music)
- 1984 – Mood Swing – The Nails (LP) RCA
- 1989 – Dancing with the Lion – Andreas Vollenweider (CD) CBS (reissued with bonus tracks 2005)
- 1993 – Angel Rodeo – Lisa Sokolov Laughing Horse Records
- 1993 – Prophecy: The Whale & the Elephant Trade Notes on the State of the World – Zusaan Kali Fasteau (Flying Note)
- 1994 – Espelho das Águas – Duofel (CD)(Velas)
- 1997 – Rising Sun – D. K. Dyson (Ocean Records)
- 1998 – Wake Up And Dream – Ekstasis (CD) CyberOctave
- 2000 – Musica (with Luiz Bueno) MCD World Music
- 2001 - Little Torch - Album: Rocket House - Chris Whitley
- 2001 – Export Quality – Dum Dum Project (2xLP) X-Squared Records
- 2001 – Daughters of the Sun – Nana Simopoulos (Na. Records)
- 2001 – Branching Out – William Cepeda (Blue Jackel)
- 2001 – The Sea to the North – Garth Hudson Woodstock Records
- 2002 – Of Unicorns and Jasmine ...A Lover's Tale – Simirillion (with Cecil Wilson) Canned Air Records
- 2002 – Sacred Spaces – Lee Boice
- 2003 – Rebirth – Children on the Corner (Sonance Records)
- 2003 – Heavy Skies – Roman Kunsman (Downtown Jazz)
- 2005 – Free Funk (with Muruga Booker & members of the Global Village Ceremonial Band, Perry Robinson & Belita Woods) Qbico 2005
- 2006 – Vivid (with Barney Mcall & Rufus Cappadocia) Jazzhead Oz
- Songs For Sitar and Tabla (with Arooj Lazewai) Cassette (Music of the World)
- 2007 – Bonfire Dreams – Various Artists, ACE
- 2008 – OrthoFunkOlogy – Free Funk (with Muruga Booker & Perry Robinson) Musart
- 2008 – An die Musik – Nobu Stowe & Alan Munshower with Badal Roy (Soul Note)
- 2008 – Miles From India – Various Artists (4Q/Times Square Records)
