= Forgotten Fantasies =

Studio album by David Liebman and Richard Beirach
- Released: 1976
- Recorded: November 18–20, 1975
- Studio: Electric Lady Studios, NYC
- Genre: Jazz
- Length: 43:14
- Label: Horizon; SP-709
- Producer: John Snyder

David Liebman chronology
| Sweet Hands (1975) | Forgotten Fantasies (1976) | Light'n Up, Please! (1976) |

Richard Beirach chronology
| Methuselah (1975) | Forgotten Fantasies (1975) | Sunday Song (1975) |

Forgotten Fantasies is an album of duets by saxophonist David Liebman and pianist Richard Beirach which was recorded in New York in 1975 and released on the Horizon label.

== Reception ==
Professional ratings
Review scores
| Source | Rating |
|---|---|
| AllMusic | 4.5/5 stars |

The AllMusic review by David R. Adler stated, "Their stark and somewhat somber music, which would be perfectly at home on the ECM label, still sounds contemporary. Beirach's chords are lush and, at times, quite dissonant and opaque, providing a complex harmonic foundation for the lyrical post-Coltrane musings of Liebman".

== Track listing ==
All compositions by David Liebman except where noted

1. "October 10th" (Richard Beirach) – 4:30
2. "Repeat Performance" – 7:35
3. "Eugene" (Beirach) – 7:57
4. "Forgotten Fantasies" – 5:24
5. "Troubled Peace" – 4:50
6. "Obsidian Mirrors" (Beirach) – 13:16

== Personnel ==
- David Liebman – tenor saxophone, soprano saxophone, echoplex, phase shifter, alto flute
- Richard Beirach – acoustic piano
