= Hubris (Richard Beirach album) =

Studio album by Richard Beirach
- Released: 1978
- Recorded: June 1977
- Studio: Tonstudio Bauer; Ludwigsburg, W. Germany
- Genre: Jazz
- Length: 39:31
- Label: ECM 1104 ST
- Producer: Manfred Eicher

Richard Beirach chronology
Leaving (1976)	Hubris (1978)	Omerta (1978)

Hubris is a solo album by American jazz pianist and composer Richard Beirach recorded in June 1977 and released on ECM the following year.

== Reception ==
The AllMusic review by Stephen Cook awarded the album 3 stars stating "Beirach showed off his Bill Evans-tinged style and revealed his own brand of soft melancholy to the jazz audience. This solo date from 1977 proves the point with nine meditative pieces, all couched in ECM's patented spacious sound. While not on the same intensity level of Keith Jarrett's work or as subtle as Evans' prime recordings, Beirach's playing here still delivers its own dreamy rewards."

Professional ratings
Review scores
Source	Rating
AllMusic	3/5 stars

== Track listing ==
All compositions by Richard Beirach.

1. "Sunday Song" - 5:26
2. "Leaving" - 5:20
3. "Koan" - 1:14
4. "Osiris" - 3:37
5. "Future Memory" - 4:52
6. "Hubris" - 6:04
7. "Rectilinear" - 2:16
8. "The Pearl" - 5:26
9. "Invisible Corridor / Sunday Song - Monday" - 5:16

== Personnel ==
- Richard Beirach – piano
