= Michael Feinberg =

American photographer

Michael Jai Feinberg
- Occupations: Photographer; Software designer
- Known for: Endorfun; Ishido lightSource Sacred Geometry software Pypeline platform
- Notable work: Endorfun; Ishido

Michael Jai Feinberg is a photographer and software designer best known for creating the computer games Endorfun and Ishido. He is also the creator of lightSource Sacred Geometry software, and more recently Pypeline, a rich-media software platform.
