= Linc Chamberland =

- Born: Lionel Victor Chamberland; September 13, 1940; Norwalk, Connecticut
- Died: June 24, 1987 (aged 46) New York City
- Genres: Jazz, rock, jazz fusion, R&B
- Occupations: Musician, teacher
- Instrument: Guitar
- Years active: 1961–mid 1980s
- Labels: Muse, Roulette, Mainstream, A&M Horizon

Lionel Victor Chamberland (13 September 1940 – 24 June 1987) was an American jazz guitarist born and based in Norwalk, Connecticut. After playing with The Orchids in the 1960s, he stopped touring, became a private teacher, and performed regionally.

== Career ==
Beginning around 1962, Chamberland was the leader of an R&B band called The Orchids. Bad experiences discouraged him from touring again. In 1971 he joined the band Sawbuck. The band's members included Frank Vicari (who replaced Dave Liebman), Pee Wee Ellis, John Gatchell, John Eckert, Schuyler "Sky" I. Ford, Chris Qualles, and Jimmy Strassburg. A year later the band was renamed Gotham and recorded an album for Motown. Chamberland died from leukemia at age 46 on June 24, 1987, in New York City.

== Guitars ==
Chamberland played a 1953 Fender Telecaster. In his search to get exactly the sound he wanted from the guitar, Chamberland modified it. From the top down, the guitar had Grover heads, a 1957 Stratocaster neck, Humbucker pick-ups, and a Gibson bridge and tailpiece. The bottom portion of the body was milled out to fit these last two things. Chamberland also modified the internal wiring. He had his bridge set abnormally high, raising the strings far off the fingerboard. This gave him his very distinctive clean tone, an example of which can be heard in his playing on "The Cat's Meow" (1965, The Orchids). The raised bridge required additional finger strength, particularly on high notes. In its original version, the Telecaster had the stock Fender bridge and tailpiece. In order to get the height on the strings that he wanted, Chamberland stuck popsicle sticks under the bridge to raise it higher.

According to Tommy Mottola, other guitarists couldn't play Chamberland's Telecaster because of the way he modified it. He replaced the E-string, the bottom one, with a banjo A-string that he bent almost to the top of his Telecaster. Mottola said there was no way to bend a guitar string like that because of the tautness. But the banjo string was so thin that it allowed Chamberland to create his R&B style. Mottola said, "Nobody, nobody, nobody had a sound like Linc's." The Telecaster became the property of Bob Maclauglin, one of Chamberland's students.

In 1975 Chamberland purchased a 1960s Gibson L-5 from Arthur Betker and recorded two jazz albums for Muse. The L-5 became the property of guitarist Paul Sullivan, one of his students during the 1970s.

== Praise ==
Tommy Mottola, who in 1990 became the Chairman and CEO of Sony Music Entertainment, called Chamberland "one of the greatest guitarist of all time." In his 2013 book, Hit Maker, Mottola said, "You won't find any mention of Linc when Rolling Stone magazine does a cover story listing their top hundred guitarists. Take it from me. In 1966, you never heard anything like Linc." Billy Vera, in his 2017 autobiography, referred to Chamberland as "the Telecaster genius."

== Discography ==
=== As leader ===
- A Place Within (Muse, 1977)
- Yet to Come with David Friesen (Muse, 1983)

=== As sideman ===
- Dave Liebman, Light'n Up, Please (A&M/Horizon, 1977)
- The Orchids, Twisting at the Round Table with the Orchids (Roulette, 1962)
- The Rascals, Peaceful World (Columbia, 1971)
- Ernie Wilkins, Hard Mother Blues (Mainstream, 1970)
