= Richie Beirach =

American jazz pianist and composer (1947–2026)

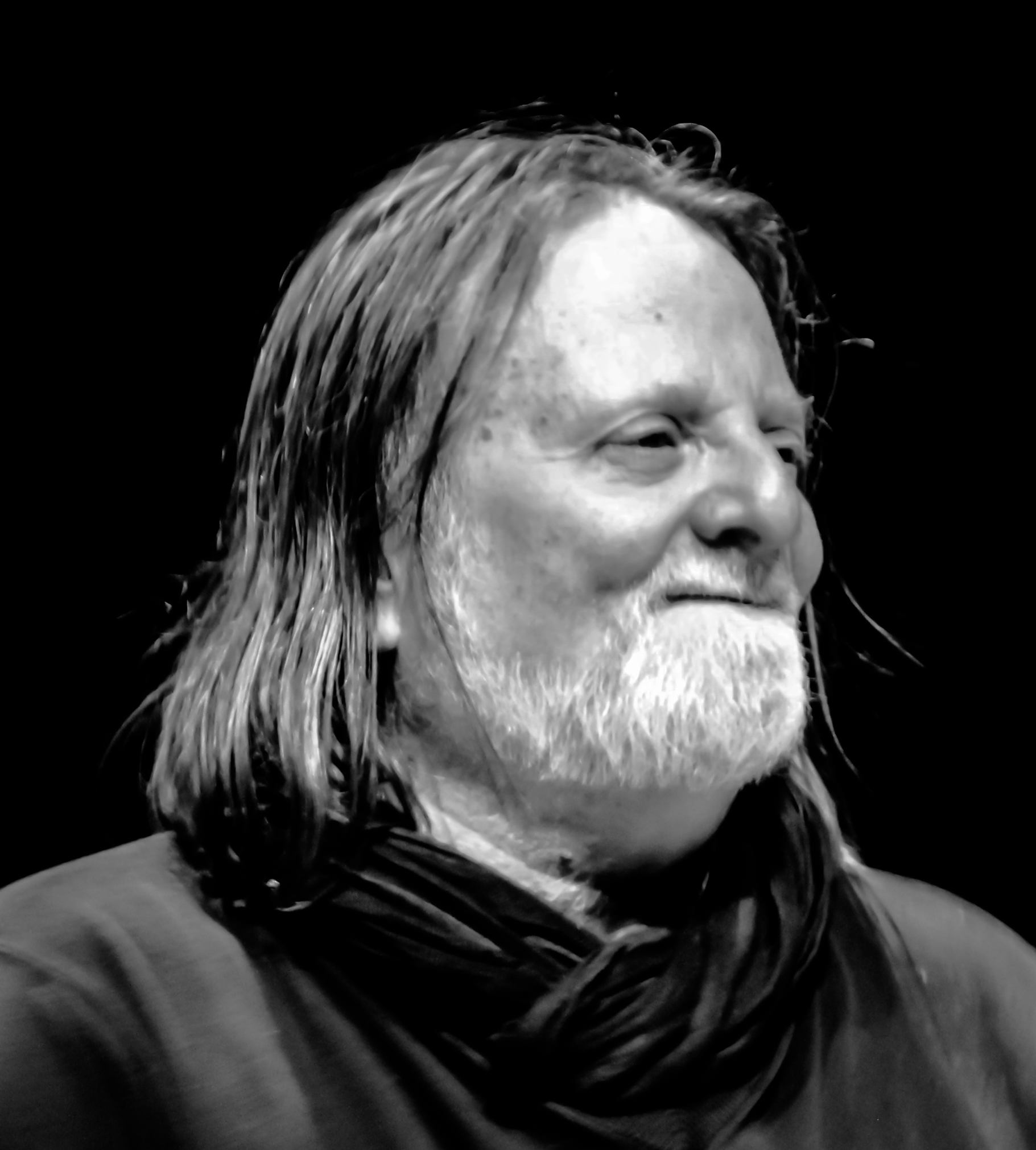
- Beirach in 2015

Background information
- Born: May 23, 1947; New York City, U.S.
- Died: January 26, 2026 (aged 78) Worms, Germany
- Genres: Jazz
- Occupations: Pianist; Composer; Academic teacher
- Instrument: Piano
- Years active: 1972–2026
- Label: ECM
- Website: richiebeirach.com

Richard Alan Beirach (/ˈbaɪræk/; May 23, 1947 – January 26, 2026) was an American jazz pianist and composer. He made hundreds of recordings, in the 1970s as an early artist of ECM playing albums including Eon, Leaving, and Hubris, in a duo with saxophone player David Liebman including Forgotten Fantasies, and in many other formations. He taught jazz piano at the University of Music and Theatre Leipzig from 2001 to 2014.

== Life and career ==
Beirach was born in New York City on May 23, 1947. As a child of six he began to study classical piano with James Palmieri, whom he would later credit with having made him "understand the deeper meaning of music". At age 13, he was introduced to jazz by hearing Red Garland's version of "Billy Boy" from Milestones, and was inspired by its improvisation which made him want to pursue a similar path. He contacted jazz musicians, while continuing Palmieri's training. While still attending high school, he took lessons from pianist and jazz theorist Lennie Tristano. He played in New York City clubs from the mid-1960s, playing with Freddie Hubbard and Lee Konitz, among others. He earned money by occasional work as a dockworker.

== Career ==
Beirach entered the Berklee College of Music in Boston to study jazz in 1967, where guitarist John Abercrombie, pianist Keith Jarrett and bassist Miroslav Vitous studied at the same time. After one year, he moved to the Manhattan School of Music, where he studied composition with Ludmila Ulehla. In 1972, he graduated with a master's degree in music theory and composition.

He began working with Stan Getz, alongside bassist Dave Holland and Jack DeJohnette on drums, making worldwide tours. He also worked with Chet Baker. Beirach maintained an ongoing musical partnership with saxophonist David Liebman, whom he met in a session in 1967. They frequently performed and recorded as a duo, including Forgotten Fantasies, Omerta and Chant. Beirach joined Liebman's band Lookout Farm in 1973, which became outstanding in the fusion movement until 1976. He made his breakthrough with the Lookout Farm album for ECM in 1974, which also featured guitarist John Abercrombie, drummers Jeff Williams and Don Alias, and bassist Frank Tusa. It was followed by Eon, his first album as leader, Leaving and Hubris, his first solo album in 1977.

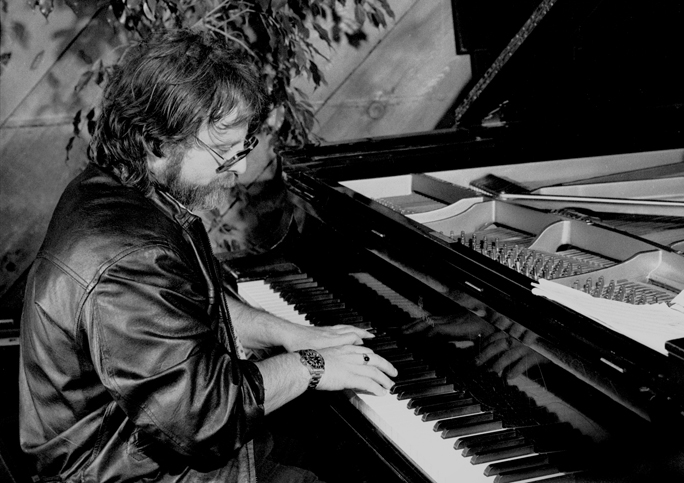
Beirach in the 1980's

In the 1980, Beirach focused on solo piano work, duos with Liebman and recordings with the band Quest that the two formed in 1981, working with drummers Al Forster and Billy Hart, and bassists George Mraz and Ron McClure. They recorded six albums, beginning with Quest and ending in 1991 with Of one mind, touring in Europe, Asia and the Americas. Beirach recorded solo albums inspired by non-musical inspiration, such as Waterlilies related to Monet's paintings and Breathing of Statues to texts by Rilke; he also recorded free improvised in albums such as Self Portraits.

Beirach mentioned Herbie Hancock as his mentor, for creating pieces in a new way each time. His style was also influenced, besides his earlier classical training, by Bill Evans and Chick Corea His playing has been described as lyrical and harmonically rich, with a "sense for group interplay".

From 2000, Richie Beirach lived in Leipzig (Germany) where he taught jazz piano at the University of Music and Theatre from 2001 to 2014, including two years past the legal age of 65. He then moved to a farm in Heßheim, invited by drummer Christian Scheuber and pianist Regina Litvinova who had studied with Beirach. They formed the New Richie Beirach Trio. He gave concerts as long as his health permitted.

Beirach died after a long illness in Worms on January 26, 2026, at the age of 78.

== Discography ==
=== As leader/co-leader ===
Year recorded	Title	Label	Personnel/Notes
1974	Eon	ECM	Trio, with Frank Tusa (bass), Jeff Williams (drums)
1975	Methuselah	Trio	Trio, with Frank Tusa (bass, electric bass), Jeff Williams (drums)
1975	Forgotten Fantasies	A&M Horizon	Duo, with Dave Liebman (tenor sax, soprano sax, echoplex, phase shifter, alto flute)
1975	Sunday Song	Trio	Duo, with Frank Tusa (bass)
1976	Zal'	Trio	One track solo piano; three tracks duo, with Yoshiaki Masuo (guitar); two tracks duo with Terumasa Hino (flugelhorn, trumpet)
1976	Leaving	Trio/Storyville	Duo, with Jeremy Steig (alto flute, soprano flute, bass flute, piccolo)
1977	Hubris	ECM	Solo piano
1978	Omerta	Trio/Storyville	Duo, with Dave Liebman (tenor sax, soprano sax, alto flute)
1978	Kahuna'	Trio	One track solo piano; one track duo, with Masahiko Togashi (percussion)
1979	Elm	ECM	Trio, with George Mraz (bass), Jack DeJohnette (drums)
1981	Elegy for Bill Evans	Palo Alto	Trio, with George Mraz (bass), Al Foster (drums)
1981	Rendezvous	IPI	Duo, with George Mraz (bass)
1981	Live in Tokyo: Solo Concert	Break Time	Solo piano; in concert; also released by PJL as Complete Solo Concert 1981 with two extra tracks
1982	Breathing of Statues	Magenta/CMP	Solo piano
1983	Continuum	Baybridge/Eastwind	Solo piano
1985	Ayers Rock	Polydor	Trio, with Terumasa Hino (trumpet), Masahiko Togashi (percussion)
1985	Antarctica	Pathfinder	Solo piano
1985	Double Edge	Storyville	Duo, with Dave Liebman
1985	The Duo: Live	Advance	Duo, with Dave Liebman
1986	Ballads	Sony Japan	Solo piano
1987	Ballads 2	Sony Japan	Solo piano
1987	Water Lilies: Richie Beirach Plays Musical Portraits of Claude Monet	Sony Japan	
1987	Emerald City	Pathfinder/Evidence	Duo, with John Abercrombie (guitar synth)
1987	Common Heart	Owl	Solo piano
1989	Some Other Time: A Tribute to Chet Baker	Triloka	With Randy Brecker (trumpet, flugelhorn), Michael Brecker (tenor sax), John Scofield (guitar), George Mraz (bass), Adam Nussbaum (drums)
1989	Chant	CMP	Duo, with Dave Liebman
1990	Convergence	Triloka	Duo, with George Coleman (tenor sax, soprano sax)
1990	Inamorata	EAU	Solo piano
1990	Self Portraits	CMP	Solo piano
1990–1991	Sunday Songs	Blue Note	Solo piano
1991	Themes and Impromptu Variations	EAU	Solo piano
1992	The Duo Session	Nabel	Duo, with Laurie Antonioli (vocals)
1992	Richie Beirach at Maybeck	Concord Jazz	Solo piano; in concert
1992	Too Grand	SteepleChase	Duo, with Andy LaVerne (piano)
1993	Universal Mind	SteepleChase	Duo, with Andy LaVerne (piano)
1993	Trust	Evidence	Trio, with Dave Holland (bass), Jack DeJohnette (drums)
1994	Solo Piano Recital: Live in Japan	Label Les Jungle	Solo piano; in concert
1996–1997	The Snow Leopard	Alfa/Evidence	Most tracks trio, with George Mraz (bass), Billy Hart (drums); some tracks quartet, with Gregor Huebner (violin) added
1997	Freedom Joy	Trial	Duo, with Masahiko Togashi (percussion)
1998	New York Rhapsody	Tokuma	Duo, with Gregor Huebner (violin)
1999	What Is This Thing Called Love?	Venus	Trio, with George Mraz, Billy Hart (drums)
1999	Round About Bartok	ACT	Trio, with George Mraz (bass), Gregor Huebner (violin)
2000	Romantic Rhapsody	Venus	Trio, with George Mraz, Billy Hart (drums)
2001	Round About Federico Mompou	ACT	Trio, with George Mraz (bass), Gregor Huebner (violin)
2002	Round About Monteverdi	ACT	Trio, with George Mraz (bass), Gregor Huebner (violin)
2002	No Borders	Venus	Most tracks trio, with George Mraz, Billy Hart (drums); some tracks quartet, with Gregor Huebner (violin) added
2006	Manhattan Reverie	Venus	Trio, with George Mraz, Billy Hart (drums)
2007	Duality: The First Ten Years	Niveau/Nuromusic	Duo, with Gregor Huebner (violin)
2007	Summer Night	Venus	Trio, with George Mraz, Billy Hart (drums)
2008	Crossing Over	Niveau	Solo piano
2008	Jazz Adagio	Venus	Solo piano
2009	Unspoken	Outnote	Duo, with Dave Liebman (tenor sax, soprano sax, flute)
2010	Quest for Freedom	Sunnyside	With Dave Liebman (soprano sax, flute), Frankfurt Radio Bigband
2010	Knowinglee	Outnote	Trio, with Lee Konitz (alto sax, soprano sax), Dave Liebman (tenor sax, soprano sax)
2010	Impressions of Tokyo: Ancient City of the Future	Outnote	Solo piano
2012	Live at Birdland New York	ACT	Quintet, with Gregor Huebner (violin), Randy Brecker (trumpet), George Mraz (bass), Billy Hart (drums); in concert
2017	Gaia, The New Richie Beirach Trio	Jazzsick	Trio, with Regina Litvinova (keyboards), Christian Scheuber (drums)
2019	Crossing Borders	Zoho	Duo, with Gregor Huebner (violin) with the WDR Big Band
2021	Empathy	Jazzline	Five-CD box set, recorded from 2016 to 2020; Empathy: Duo, with Dave Liebman (tenor sax, soprano sax); Lifelines: Trio, with Dave Liebman (tenor sax, soprano sax), Jack DeJohnette (drums); Aural Landscapes: Solo, Dave Liebman (saxophones, wooden flute, piano); Hearts of Darkness: Solo, Richie Beirach (piano); Aftermath: Quartet, with Dave Liebman (tenor sax, soprano sax, wooden flute, c-flute), Florian Van Volxem (buchla synthesizer), Leo Henrichs (modified tympani, gong)
2022	Leaving	Jazzline	Solo piano

=== As a member ===
Quest

- Quest (Trio, 1982) – recorded in 1981
- Quest II (Storyville, 1986) – Live
- Midpoint: : Live at the Montmartre (Quest III, Storyille, 1988)
- N.Y. Nites: Standards (PAN Music/NEC Avenue, 1988)
- Natural Selection (Pathfinder/NEC Avenue, 1988)
- Of One Mind (CMP, 1990)

=== As sideman ===
With John Abercrombie

- Arcade (ECM, 1978)
- Abercrombie Quartet (ECM, 1979)
- M (ECM, 1980)

With Chet Baker

- You Can't Go Home Again (Horizon, 1977)
- The Best Thing for You (A&M, 1989) – recorded in 1977

With Dave Liebman

- First Visit (Philips, 1973)
- Lookout Farm (ECM, 1973)
- Sweet Hands (Horizon, 1975)
- Light'n Up, Please! (Horizon, 1976)
- Pendulum (Artists House, 1978)

With John Scofield

- John Scofield Live (Enja, 1978) - recorded November 4, 1977

With George Mraz

- My Foolish Heart (Milestone, 1995)
