= Dave Liebman =

American saxophonist, flautist and jazz educator (born 1946)

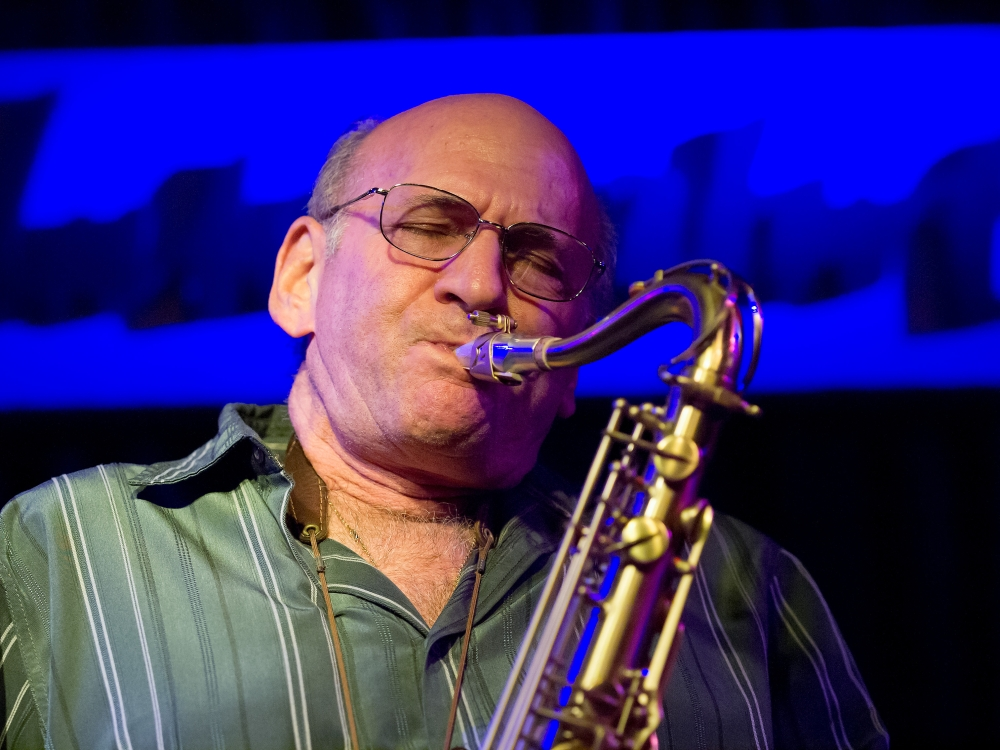
- Liebman performing on September 27, 2011

Background information
- Born: David Liebman; September 4, 1946 (age 80); Brooklyn, New York City, U.S.
- Genres: Jazz, avant-garde jazz, jazz fusion, bebop, hard bop, post-bop, modal jazz
- Occupations: Saxophonist, flautist, bandleader, educator, composer
- Instruments: Tenor saxophone, soprano saxophone, flute, alto flute
- Years active: 1960s–present
- Labels: ECM, Enja, Timeless, Sunnyside, HatHut, OWL
- Website: davidliebman.com

David Liebman (born September 4, 1946) is an American saxophonist, flautist, bandleader, composer, and jazz educator. Best known for his work on soprano saxophone, he toured and recorded with Miles Davis during the trumpeter's electric period, appearing on On The Corner. He has appeared on more than 500 recordings, including about 200 as a leader or co-leader, and was named a NEA Jazz Master in 2011. He founded and serves as artistic director of the International Association of Schools of Jazz (IASJ).

== Biography ==
=== Early life and career ===
Liebman was born in Brooklyn, New York, in 1946 to a Jewish family. He contracted polio in 1949. He studied classical piano from age nine and saxophone from twelve. Hearing John Coltrane at New York clubs including Birdland, the Village Vanguard, and the Half Note was formative. He studied with Joe Allard, Lennie Tristano, and Charles Lloyd, and earned a degree in American history from New York University.

In the early 1970s, after recording with Genya Ravan and Ten Wheel Drive, Liebman helped organize the musician-run collective Free Life Communication — a hub of New York's loft-jazz scene — with support from the New York State Council on the Arts. He then joined drummer Elvin Jones’s group. In 1973 he became a member of Miles Davis’s ensemble, appearing on the live Dark Magus and the studio double album Get Up with It.

=== Lookout Farm, Quest, and later groups ===
At the same time Liebman began leading his own projects, first the Open Sky Trio with Bob Moses, then Lookout Farm with pianist Richie Beirach. The group's self-titled debut appeared on ECM Records in 1974 and toured widely in North America, Europe, India, and Japan. He also recorded with Pee Wee Ellis.

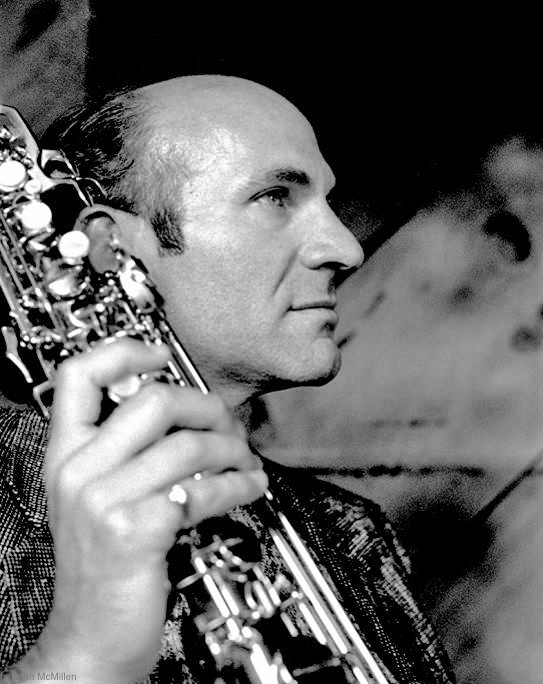
Liebman at Bach Dancing & Dynamite Society, June 1987

In 1977 Liebman toured with Chick Corea, and the next year formed a quintet featuring John Scofield, Kenny Kirkland, and Terumasa Hino. In 1981 he and Beirach co-founded Quest with Ron McClure and Billy Hart, recording seven albums and touring internationally through the early 1990s.

From the 1990s through 2013 Liebman led the Dave Liebman Group with guitarist Vic Juris, followed by Expansions (Tony Marino, Bobby Avey, Matt Vashlishan, Alex Ritz). He worked extensively with European musicians including Joachim Kühn, Daniel Humair, Paolo Fresu, Jon Christensen, and Bobo Stenson, and appeared with large ensembles such as the Brussels Jazz Orchestra, WDR Big Band, NDR Bigband, Metropole Orkest, Klangforum Wien, and the Ensemble InterContemporain. He also co-led Saxophone Summit with Michael Brecker, Joe Lovano, and later Ravi Coltrane, releasing Gathering of Spirits (2004) and Seraphic Light (2008).

=== 1990s to present ===
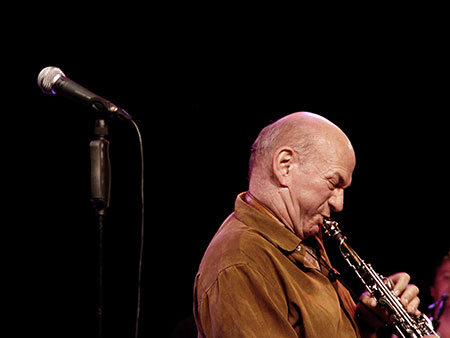
Liebman in Aarhus, Denmark, in 2014

Liebman's output ranges from straight-ahead jazz to fusion, avant-garde, and chamber music, with projects devoted to Thelonious Monk, John Coltrane, Kurt Weill, Alec Wilder, Cole Porter, Antônio Carlos Jobim, Giacomo Puccini, and The Beatles. He has regularly ranked among the top soprano saxophonists in DownBeat Critics and Readers Polls since the 1970s.

He has published instructional books including A Chromatic Approach to Jazz Harmony and Melody, Developing a Personal Saxophone Sound, Self Portrait of a Jazz Artist, and Jazz Connections: Miles Davis and David Liebman. With musicologist Lewis Porter he authored What It Is: The Life of a Jazz Artist (2012). With pianist Richie Beirach he co-wrote Ruminations and Reflections: The Musical Journey of Dave Liebman and Richie Beirach (2022).

In 1989 Liebman founded the International Association of Schools of Jazz, serving as artistic director. He has received grants from the NEA, the Canadian Arts Council, and European funding agencies; scored music for the JazzEx Ballet Company in the Netherlands; and composed Ocean of Light (2006). He is Artist-in-Residence at the Manhattan School of Music and was visiting artist at the University of Toronto in 2014–15.

In 2018 he donated his papers, recordings, and memorabilia — spanning 1955–2017 — to the Berklee College of Music Archives.

== Musical style and recognition ==
Liebman is noted for his soprano tone, motivic development, and chromatic approach. He was named an NEA Jazz Master in 2011, received Australia's ARIA Award for Best Jazz Album in 2007 with Mike Nock for Duologue, and was appointed Officier of the Ordre des Arts et des Lettres in 2009. He received a nomination for Best Jazz Instrumental Solo for “My Favorite Things” at the 41st Grammy Awards (1999, for 1998–99 eligibility). In 1988 the Académie du Jazz (France) named his album Homage to Coltrane its Record of the Year.

== Personal life ==
Liebman has been married since 1987 to oboist and composer Caris Visentin Liebman. Their daughter, Lydia Liebman, is a jazz publicist and media strategist. She founded Lydia Liebman Promotions, a New York–based PR and consulting firm launched while she was a student at Emerson College. The company has managed more than 700 album release campaigns, including several Grammy Award nominees. She was named to Forbes 30 Under 30 (Music) in 2021 and joined the faculty of the Roc Nation School of Music, Sports & Entertainment at Long Island University. She has also lectured at Berklee College of Music, USC, and the Royal Academy of Music.

== Selected discography ==
- Lookout Farm (ECM, 1974)
- Pendulum: Live at the Village Vanguard (Artists House, 1978; Mosaic reissue)
- Omerta (with Richie Beirach; Trio/Storyville, 1978)
- If They Only Knew (Timeless, 1980)
- Quest II (with Quest; Storyville, 1986)
- The Loneliness of a Long Distance Runner (CMP, 1986)
- Time Immemorial (HatART, 1991)
- Miles Away: A Tribute to Miles Davis (OWL, 1993)
- Gathering of Spirits (with Saxophone Summit; Telarc, 2004)
- Duologue (with Mike Nock; Birdland, 2007) — ARIA Best Jazz Album

== Awards and nominations ==
=== ARIA Music Awards ===
Year	Nominee / work	Award	Result	Ref.
2007	Duologue (with Mike Nock)	Best Jazz Album	Won	

=== French Jazz Academy ===
Year	Nominee / work	Award	Result	Ref.
1988	Homage to Coltrane	Record of the Year	Won	

=== Grammy Awards ===
Year	Nominee / work	Award	Result	Ref.
1999	"My Favorite Things" (track)	Best Jazz Instrumental Solo	Nominated	

=== International Association of Jazz Educators ===
Year	Nominee / work	Award	Result	Ref.
2000	Dave Liebman	Hall of Fame	inducted	
