= Dan Wall =

American jazz organist and pianist (1953–2026)

Daniel Lee Wall Jr. (September 7, 1953 – April 14, 2026) was an American jazz organist, pianist and university professor.

== Life and career ==
Wall was leading his own small group at Atlanta club the Carousel while still in high school. He attended the Berklee College of Music, then worked with Karl Ratzer from 1974 to 1977. Following this he played extensively with Jeremy Steig (1977–1982) and recorded with Ike Isaacs and Maxine Sullivan; he would also lead a trio with Isaacs and Steve Ellington during this time.

In the 1980s he worked with Steve Grossman, Jimmy Madison, Henry Mancini, David Earle Johnson, and Eddie Gomez, and in the 1990s with John Abercrombie, Adam Nussbaum, Christoph Schweitzer, and Jerry Bergonzi. In addition to his work in pop and jazz idioms, he also did studio work for film scores and the advertising industry. He married singer Carol Veto in the 1980s; she sang in a group he led from 1985 to 1988.

He taught at Oberlin College from 2001 until his retirement in 2025. Wall died on April 14, 2026, at the age of 72.

== Discography ==
=== As leader or co-leader ===
- Song for the Night (Landslide, 1980)
- Route Two (Landslide, 1981) with David Earle Johnson, John Abercrombie
- The Trio (Audiophile, 1982)
- While We're Young (ECM, 1993) with John Abercrombie, Adam Nussbaum
- Speak of the Devil (ECM, 1994) as John Abercrombie Trio with John Abercrombie, Adam Nussbaum
- Tactics (ECM, 1997) with John Abercrombie, Adam Nussbaum
- Golden Moments (Koch Jazz, 1997) with Ernie Krivda
- Off the Wall (Enja, 1997)
- On the Inside Looking In (Double-Time, 2000)

=== As sideman ===
With Jerry Bergonzi

- Just Within (Double-Time, 1997)
- Lost in the Shuffle (Double-Time, 1998) as Jerry Bergonzi Trio
- Wiggy (Double-Time, 2000)
- A Different Look (Double-Time, 2001)

With Karl Ratzer

- Street Talk (Vanguard, 1979)
- Finger Prints (CMP, 1979) as Karl Ratzer Group
- Saturn Returning (Enja, 1997)

With Maxine Sullivan and Ike Isaacs

- Maxine Sullivan with the Ike Isaacs Quartet (Audiophile, 1981) as Maxine Sullivan with the Ike Isaacs Quartet
- Enjoy Yourself! (Audiophile, 1986) as Maxine Sullivan, Bob Haggart, Ike Isaacs featuring Dardanelle, Sil Austin, Dan Wall

With others

- John Abercrombie – Open Land (ECM, 1999) with Kenny Wheeler, Joe Lovano, Mark Feldman, Adam Nussbaum
- Carl Verheyen, Karl Ratzer – Real to Reel (Dominant, 2000)

== Sources ==
- "Dan Wall". The New Grove Dictionary of Jazz. 2nd edition, ed. Barry Kernfeld.
