= New Rags =

Studio album by Jack DeJohnette's Directions
- Released: 1977
- Recorded: May 1977
- Studios: Tonstudio Bauer; Ludwigsburg, W. Germany
- Genres: Jazz, avant-garde jazz, jazz fusion
- Length: 40:48
- Label: ECM 1103 ST
- Producer: Manfred Eicher

Jack DeJohnette chronology
Pictures (1977)	New Rags (1977)	Gateway 2 (1978)

Jack DeJohnette's Directions chronology
Untitled (1976)	New Rags (1977)

Professional ratings
Review scores
Source	Rating
AllMusic	2.5/5 stars
The Rolling Stone Jazz Record Guide	4/5 stars

New Rags is an album by drummer Jack DeJohnette's band Directions, recorded in May 1977 and released by ECM Records later that year. Directions consists of saxophonist Alex Foster, guitarist John Abercrombie (with whom DeJohnette had worked with in Gateway), and bassist Mike Richmond.

== Track listing ==
All compositions by Jack DeJohnette except as indicated

1. "Minya's the Mooch" – 11:22
2. "Lydia" – 3:43
3. "Flys" (Alex Foster) – 6:05
4. "New Rags" – 9:08
5. "Steppin' Thru" (Alex Foster) – 10:30

== Personnel ==
Jack DeJohnette's Direction

- Alex Foster – tenor and soprano saxophones
- John Abercrombie – electric guitar, electric mandolin
- Mike Richmond – bass, electric bass
- Jack DeJohnette – drums, piano

Technical personnel

- Manfred Eicher – producer
- Martin Wieland – engineer
- Dieter Bonhorst – layout design
- Lajos Keresztes – cover photo
