= Cloud Dance =

Studio album by Collin Walcott
- Released: 1976
- Recorded: March 1975
- Studios: Tonstudio Bauer; Ludwigsburg, W. Germany
- Genres: World music, jazz
- Length: 39:30
- Label: ECM 1062 ST
- Producer: Manfred Eicher

Collin Walcott chronology
Cloud Dance (1976)	Grazing Dreams (1977)

Cloud Dance is the debut album by American sitarist and composer Collin Walcott, recorded in March 1975 and released on ECM the following year. The quartet features rhythm section John Abercrombie, Dave Holland and Jack DeJohnette, the three of whom recorded their self-titled debut, Gateway that same month.

== Background ==
Abercrombie had worked with Walcott the previous year on David Liebman's Drum Ode (1975), and would go on to play on Walcott's sophomore album Grazing Dreams (1977).

== Reception ==
Professional ratings
Review scores
Source	Rating
AllMusic	4.5/5 stars
The Rolling Stone Jazz Record Guide	2/5 stars
The Penguin Guide to Jazz	4/4 stars

The AllMusic review awarded the album 4½ stars.

The authors of the Penguin Guide to Jazz Recordings awarded the album 4 stars, praising its "freshness and originality," and stating: "'Prancing', for just tablas and double bass, is one of the most exciting performances in the ECM catalogue and convincing evidence of Walcott's desire to extend the idiom of the Garrison/Jones rhythm section... the album as a whole can quite reasonably be heard as a suite of related pieces that dance towards their thematic source in the closing title-piece."

Writing for Vinyl Vault, Geoff Anderson commented: "The musicians were all top-flight and leaders in their own right. They came together and mixed the eastern and western sounds to create something like acoustic jazz-fusion with an Indian twist. Abercrombie's ethereal electric guitar, floating above and around Walcott's sitar is particularly effective in creating a dreamy, cloud-like ambience on several tunes. On the cut 'Prancing,' Walcott on tabla and Holland on bass put the 'dance' in 'Cloud Dance' with a particularly energetic and, yes, danceable performance."

In a post for ECM blog Between Sound and Space, Tyran Grillo called the recording "one of [Walcott's] most powerful albums ever to grace ECM's vinyl ... grooves," and wrote: "The telephone wires on the cover are like the strings of some large instrument, with the sky as its sound box. Its clouds don't so much dance as perform, caressing endless waves of voices careening through the ether. The joy of Cloud Dance is that it makes those voices intelligible. Fans of Oregon, of which Walcott was of course an integral part, need look no further for likeminded contemplation."

== Track listing ==
All tracks are written by Collin Walcott, except as noted.

Side I
No.	Title	Length
1.	"Margueritte"	8:32
2.	"Prancing"	3:24
3.	"Night Glider"	6:40
Total length:		18:36

Side II
No.	Title	Writer(s)	Length
1.	"Scimitar"	John Abercrombie; Collin Walcott	2:46
2.	"Vadana"	Dave Holland	7:00
3.	"Eastern Song"		2:34
4.	"Padma"	Abercrombie; Walcott	2:47
5.	"Cloud Dance"		5:47
Total length:			20:54 39:30

== Personnel ==
- Collin Walcott – sitar, tabla
- John Abercrombie – guitar
- Dave Holland – bass
- Jack DeJohnette – drums
