= I'm Getting Sentimental over You =

Song by The Dorsey Brothers

"I'm Gettin' Sentimental over You" is a 1932 song first released by the Dorsey Brothers Orchestra. It was recorded by Tommy Dorsey and His Orchestra in 1935, becoming his theme song. The lyrics were written by Ned Washington and the music was by George Bassman. It was first released in 1932 by the Dorsey Brothers Orchestra with Jean Bowes on vocals on Brunswick Records. The orchestra re-recorded it in August 1934 with Bob Crosby on vocals for Decca Records. The original copyright is dated 1933 and issued to Lawrence Music Publishers, Inc. The copyright was assigned to Mills Music, Inc. in 1934. Noni Bernardi, a saxophonist with the Dorsey orchestra arranged this song.

Dorsey was the featured trombone soloist when his orchestra played it. It was first recorded in September 1935. A second recording on October 18, 1935 in New York is the arrangement that Tommy would henceforth feature. Cliff Weston was the vocalist and trumpet player. It was released in 1936 by RCA Victor. After Tommy Dorsey's death in 1956 Frank Sinatra sang it in the Dorsey Orchestra and also featured it in an album, I Remember Tommy.

This song was featured in an episode of The Twilight Zone called "Static", and in the films Carnal Knowledge, Bart Got a Room, Radio Days and the Oscar-winning The Garden of the Finzi-Continis.

The tempo is considered a fox trot or swing.

== Covers ==
- The Ink Spots featuring Bill Kenny (1939)
- Carol Bruce sang the song in the 1941 Universal comedy-musical Keep 'Em Flying starring Bud Abbott and Lou Costello
- Spike Jones and his City Slickers released a recording of the song on RCA Victor in 1948. They performed the song with Tommy Dorsey on a "Music America Loves Best" broadcast in June 1945. This version appears on the album, Spike Jones' Thank You Music Lovers.
- The Four Freshmen – The Freshmen Year
- Earl Bostic as the B-side of 1951 single "Flamingo".
- Patti Page on her 1956 album Music for Two in Love.
- The song was a staple of Thelonious Monk's live sets from the early 1950s, and he recorded it a number of times Thelonious Himself (1957).
- Mel Torme, 1958, in a version conducted and arranged by Marty Paich
- Herb Alpert & The Tijuana Brass covered the song on their 1965 album Going Places. Their rendition begins with a single horn, playing slowly, in the Big Band style, before breaking into a jazzy rendition by the full Brass.
- Ella Fitzgerald – Sings Songs from Let No Man Write My Epitaph, Verve Records, 1960.
- Bobby Vinton on his 1962 album Bobby Vinton Sings the Big Ones
- Harry James on his 1979 album One Night Stand With Harry James on Tour in '64 (Joyce LP 1074)
- The Glenn Miller Orchestra, conducted by Buddy DeFranco, covered the song in a stylized mix containing both elements of the Alpert/TJB arrangement and quotes from the original Glenn Miller band's upbeat hits. Released as a single, it reached #12 on Billboard's "Easy Listening" survey in 1966.
- Andy Cole on his 1970 album Sentimental Over You (EMI/Columbia, 1970).
- Bing Crosby recorded the song for his album Feels Good, Feels Right (1976).
- The band They Might Be Giants covered this song in the mid-1980s and released it on their 1997 compilation, Then: The Earlier Years.
- Maynard Ferguson on his live double album M.F. Horn 4&5: Live At Jimmy's.
- Urbie Green on The Persuasive Trombone.
- John Abercrombie and Don Thompson on 1991 album Witchcraft.
- Les Deux Love Orchestra on the 2009 album Ecstasy.
- Cabaret artist Maude Maggart covered the song on her 2005 album With Sweet Despair.
- Jazz saxophonist Sonny Stitt recorded a version of the song on his 1963 album Now!.
- Charles Mingus on Mingus Plays Piano.
- Brian Lynch on Keep Your Circle Small
- Gerry Mulligan on Gerry Mulligan Quartet with Bob Brookmeyer (1962) and on Walk on the Water, orchestrated, 1980

== Sources ==
- Printed sheet music of 1st trombone part
- Levinson, Peter J. (2005). Tommy Dorsey: Livin' in a Great Big Way: a Biography. Cambridge, MA: Da Capo Press. ISBN 978-0-306-81111-1.
- Robert L. Stockdale, Tommy Dorsey: On the Side (Metuchen, NJ: The Scarecrow Press, 1995) ISBN 978-0-8108-2951-0
