= Speak of the Devil (John Abercrombie album) =

Studio album by John Abercrombie
- Released: 1994
- Recorded: July 1993
- Studio: Rainbow, Oslo, Norway
- Genre: Jazz
- Length: 68:16
- Label: ECM
- Producer: Manfred Eicher

John Abercrombie chronology
November (1993)	Speak of the Devil (1994)	Tactics (1997)

Speak of the Devil is an album by jazz guitarist John Abercrombie with organist Dan Wall and drummer Adam Nussbaum, recorded in 1993 and released by ECM Records in 1994.

== Reception ==
Professional ratings
Review scores
Source	Rating
AllMusic	2.5/5 stars
The Penguin Guide to Jazz	3/4 stars

The AllMusic review by Michael G. Nastos stated, "Though While We're Young was a definitive recording for Abercrombie's vaunted trio, this CD simply offers a different slant. It's the sign of a group either in transition of evolution, and whatever the case, it's an intriguing step for these three uncanny sonic explorers". The Penguin Guide to Jazz gave the album 3 stars, stating, "It must have been fun to play, but there is too little for the listener to get a purchase on".

== Track listing ==
All compositions by John Abercrombie except were indicated

1. "Angel Food" (Wall) – 7:55
2. "Now and Again" (Abercrombie, Nussbaum, Wall) – 6:16
3. "Mahat" (Abercrombie, Nussbaum, Wall) – 8:27
4. "Chorale" – 8:21
5. "Farewell" – 6:16
6. "BT–U" (Nussbaum) – 6:22
7. "Early to Bed" – 8:20
8. "Dreamland" (Wall) – 9:12
9. "Hell's Gate" (Wall) – 7:07

== Personnel ==
- John Abercrombie – guitar
- Dan Wall – Hammond organ
- Adam Nussbaum – drums
