= Getting There =

Getting There may refer to:

- Getting There, a 1980 TV movie starring Jane Connell
- Getting There (album), a 1988 album by John Abercrombie
- Getting There (film), a 2002 film
- "Getting There (Interlude)", a song from Olivia Dean's 2023 album Messy
