= In the Moment (Gateway album) =

1996 studio album by jazz trio Gateway

Studio album by Gateway
- Released: 1996
- Recorded: December 1994
- Studio: Power Station, New York City
- Genre: Jazz
- Length: 45:56
- Label: ECM; ECM 1574
- Producer: Manfred Eicher

Gateway chronology
Homecoming (1995)	In the Moment (1996)

John Abercrombie chronology
Homecoming (1995)	In the Moment (1996)	Tactics (1997)

Dave Holland chronology
Dream of the Elders (1996)	In the Moment (1996)	Points of View (1998)

Jack DeJohnette chronology
Homecoming (1995)	In the Moment (1996)	Dancing with Nature Spirits (1996)

In the Moment is the fourth and final album by jazz trio Gateway, consisting of guitarist John Abercrombie, bassist Dave Holland and drummer Jack DeJohnette, recorded in December 1994 and released on ECM in 1996.

== Reception ==
Professional ratings
Review scores
Source	Rating
AllMusic	3/5 stars
The Penguin Guide to Jazz Recordings	3.5/4 stars

The authors of The Penguin Guide to Jazz Recordings wrote: "In the Moment is supergroup playing of a high order, three hugely experienced musicians interacting without anxiety and with dazzling ease."

The review at AllMusic states: "The collective trio Gateway has worked together on and off for three decades. They're sympathetically matched, with the five pieces on this album emerging from extended improvisations. The tonal range they embrace is dazzling, switching gears from Indian-flavored propulsion... to ethereal tone poems... Jack DeJohnette's ability to work equally well as a percussionist/drummer and pianist... benefits the group, and they make full use of the further possibilities offered. DeJohnette's work on the Turkish frame drum is extremely skilled and inventive, adding a key element to complement John Abercrombie's bent-note improvisations."

Tyran Grillo, writing for ECM blog Between Sound and Space, commented:

DeJohnette chants through a Turkish frame drum for the start, Abercrombie working his microtonal magic with an ess-curved twang. This formula persists because it works, finding new purpose in "Cinuçen." Pregnant like a Saharan sky, it lets down its golden hair and lumbers through "The Enchanted Forest" to catch up to its own jangling caravan. The interaction between bass and drums make tracks like "Shrubberies" the beautiful things that they are. As far a cry as possible from the Monty Python images its title may evoke, this is an honest excursion that lowers us like a sleeping child into "Soft." For this, Holland draws his bow like the Loch Ness monster beneath Abercrombie's wavering reflections as a pianistic fog assures the sighting will never be captured. Magic and pure to the last, this one is.

== Track listing ==
All compositions by John Abercrombie, Jack DeJohnette & Dave Holland

1. "In the Moment" - 8:37
2. "The Enchanted Forest" - 9:23
3. "Cinucen" - 6:45
4. "Shrubberies" - 14:02
5. "Soft" - 7:09

== Personnel ==
Gateway

- John Abercrombie – guitar
- Dave Holland – bass
- Jack DeJohnette – drums, electronic drums, Korg wave-drum, Turkish frame drum, piano

Technical personnel

- Manfred Eicher – producer
- Jan Erik Kongshaug – engineer
- Barbara Wojirsch – cover design
