= The Third Quartet =

Studio album by John Abercrombie
- Released: March 30, 2007
- Recorded: June 2006
- Studio: Avatar (New York, New York)
- Genre: Jazz
- Length: 59:29
- Label: ECM; ECM 1993
- Producer: Manfred Eicher

John Abercrombie chronology
| Structures (2006) | The Third Quartet (2007) | Wait Till You See Her (2009) |

The Third Quartet is an album by guitarist John Abercrombie, recorded in June 2006 and released on ECM Records in 2007. The quartet features violinist Mark Feldman and rhythm section Marc Johnson and Joey Baron.

== Reception ==
Professional ratings
Review scores
| Source | Rating |
|---|---|
| AllMusic | 4/5 stars |
| The Penguin Guide to Jazz | 👑 |
| Tom Hull | B+ |

The AllMusic review by Thom Jurek stated, "Third Quartet is the third album by this rather astonishing group of musicians under guitarist and composer John Abercrombie's leadership. His collaborators: drummer Joey Baron, violinist Mark Feldman, and bassist Marc Johnson are all accomplished leaders in their own rights, but as they team with Abercrombie, something unusual, unwieldy, and utterly transformative takes place... This is a most welcome and beautiful addition to this particular group's musical language as well as their catalog."

The Penguin Guide to Jazz awarded it four stars and a "Crown."

== Track listing ==
All tracks are written by John Abercrombie except as noted.

| No. | Title | Writer(s) | Length |
|---|---|---|---|
| 1. | "Banshee" | | 5:53 |
| 2. | "Number 9" | | 5:30 |
| 3. | "Vingt Six" | | 4:24 |
| 4. | "Wishing Bell" | | 8:19 |
| 5. | "Bred" | | 7:08 |
| 6. | "Tres" | | 6:14 |
| 7. | "Round Trip" | Ornette Coleman | 5:03 |
| 8. | "Epilogue" | Bill Evans | 5:18 |
| 9. | "Elvin" | | 8:27 |
| 10. | "Fine" | | 3:23 |
| Total length: | | | 59:29 |

== Personnel ==
- John Abercrombie – guitar
- Mark Feldman – violin
- Marc Johnson – double bass
- Joey Baron – drums
