= November (John Abercrombie album) =

Studio album by John Abercrombie
- Released: November 1993
- Recorded: November 1992
- Studio: Rainbow; Oslo, Norway
- Genre: Jazz
- Length: 69:17
- Label: ECM; ECM 1502
- Producer: Manfred Eicher

John Abercrombie chronology
While We're Young (1993)	November (1993)	Speak of the Devil (1994)

November is an album by American jazz guitarist John Abercrombie, recorded in November 1992 and released by ECM Records in 1993. The trio features rhythm section Marc Johnson and Peter Erskine with reed player John Surman.

== Reception ==
Professional ratings
Review scores
Source	Rating
AllMusic	3/5 stars
The Penguin Guide to Jazz	4/4 stars

The AllMusic review by Thom Jurek stated, "It's a solid session from beginning to end, but one still wishes Eicher would take his hands off the sound controls a bit, allowing some of the rawness that each of these players shows in live settings to enter the studio."

The Penguin Guide to Jazz gave the album 4 stars, stating, "Reconvening the trio with Johnson and Erskine was a masterstroke. Teaming them with stablemate Surman was little short of genius... Superb, evocative modern jazz."

== Track listing ==
All compositions by John Abercrombie except as indicated

1. "The Cat's Back" (Abercrombie, Erskine, Johnson, Surman) – 6:24
2. "J.S." – 6:14
3. "Right Brain Patrol" (Johnson) – 9:00
4. "Prelude" – 3:27
5. "November" (Abercrombie, Erskine, Johnson) – 8:26
6. "Rise and Fall" (Erskine) – 5:22
7. "John's Waltz" – 5:40
8. "Ogeda" (Surman) – 4:40
9. "Tuesday Afternoon" (Erskine, Johnson) – 2:55
10. "To Be" – 5:24
11. "Come Rain or Come Shine" (Harold Arlen, Johnny Mercer) – 6:04
12. "Big Music" – 5:41

== Personnel ==
- John Abercrombie – guitar
- Marc Johnson – double bass
- Peter Erskine – drums
- John Surman – soprano saxophone, baritone saxophone, bass clarinet
