= Alex Foster (musician) =

American jazz musician

- Born: Paul Alexander Foster; May 10, 1953 (age 72); Oakland, California, U.S.
- Genres: Avant-garde jazz
- Occupation: Musician
- Instruments: Alto saxophone, tenor saxophone
- Years active: 1973–present
- Labels: Big World, Jazzline, Truspace

Alex Foster (born May 10, 1953) is an American jazz musician who plays alto and tenor saxophone. He has recorded for record labels since the early 1970s. He is known for playing alto sax in the Saturday Night Live house band. He is also the co-musical director for the Mingus Big Band (which was nominated for a Grammy Award in 2005, and later winning the award for Best Large Jazz Ensemble), Mingus Orchestra and Mingus Dynasty.

== Discography ==
- 1975: Cosmic Chicken (Prestige) with Jack DeJohnette's Directions
- 1976: Untitled (ECM) with Jack DeJohnette's Directions
- 1977: New Rags (ECM) with Jack DeJohnette's Directions
- 1977: Transaxdrum (Finite)
- 1978: Headin' Home (A&M/Horizon) with Jimmy Owens
- 1991: Beginnings: Goodbye (Big World)
- 1995: The News (Jazzline) with Kirk Lightsey, Tony Lakatos, George Mraz
- 1997: Pool of Dreams (Truspace) with Michael Wolff

== Collaborations ==
- Sally Can't Dance - Lou Reed (1974)
- I'll Keep On Loving You - Linda Clifford (1982)
- Graceland - Paul Simon (1986)
- The Hunger - Michael Bolton (1987)
- It's Like This - Rickie Lee Jones (2000)
- Prism - Katy Perry (2013)
- The Music Never Stops - Betty Carter (2019)
