= Cat 'n' Mouse =

Studio album by John Abercrombie
- Released: February 19, 2002
- Recorded: December 2000
- Studio: Avatar, New York City
- Genre: Jazz
- Length: 59:46
- Label: ECM; ECM 1770
- Producer: Manfred Eicher

John Abercrombie chronology
Open Land (1999)	Cat 'n' Mouse (2002)	Class Trip (2004)

Cat 'n' Mouse is a studio album by American jazz guitarist John Abercrombie, recorded in December 2000 and released on ECM Records in 2002. The quartet features violinist Mark Feldman and rhythm section Marc Johnson and Joey Baron.

== Reception ==
Professional ratings
Review scores
Source	Rating
AllMusic	3/5 stars
The Penguin Guide to Jazz	4/4 stars
Tom Hull	A−

The AllMusic review gave the album three stars, stating, "John Abercombie makes it clear on Cat 'n' Mouse exactly why he continues to be regarded as one of jazz's most creative and progressive guitarist... On the album's numerous contemplative tunes, it's a pleasure to hear Abercombie and Feldman's lines cris-crossing, creating spontaneous tone poems that bear beauty and invention in equal measure."

The Penguin Guide to Jazz gave the album four stars, stating, "John sounds in great form but it's very often the fiddle that cuts through the mix to make the most empathic statements."

== Track listing ==
All compositions by John Abercrombie except as indicated

1. "A Nice Idea" – 10:57
2. "Convolution" – 5:34
3. "String Thing" – 4:02
4. "Soundtrack" – 8:06
5. "Third Stream Samba" (John Abercrombie, Joey Baron, Mark Feldman, Marc Johnson) – 8:45
6. "On the Loose" – 6:00
7. "Stop and Go" – 7:04
8. "Show of Hands" (Abercrombie, Baron, Feldman, Johnson) – 9:18

== Personnel ==
- John Abercrombie – guitar
- Mark Feldman – violin
- Marc Johnson – double bass
- Joey Baron – drums
