= Witchcraft (John Abercrombie album) =

Studio album by John Abercrombie and Don Thompson
- Released: 1991
- Recorded: June 24–25, 1986
- Studio: Puget Sound, Toronto
- Genre: Jazz
- Length: 59:46
- Label: Justin Time
- Producer: John Abercrombie and Don Thompson

John Abercrombie chronology
Animato (1990)	Witchcraft (1991)	While We're Young (1993)

Professional ratings
Review scores
Source	Rating
Allmusic	3.5/5 stars

Witchcraft is a studio album by American jazz guitarist John Abercrombie with Canadian bassist/pianist Don Thompson that was recorded in Toronto in 1986 and released by Justin Time in 1991.

== Reception ==
Dan Cross of Allmusic stated:

For followers who bemoan guitarist John Abercrombie's tendency to record rather adventurous albums with an often electronically treated tone, Witchcraft will be a delight. On this duo recording with bassist Don Thompson (who also plays piano on three tracks), the guitarists' sound is untreated, and the repertoire is standards. The two play well together, and there are some lovely moments on the record. The title track finds Abercrombie using the differing tonal qualities of his guitar's open strings to give the melody a unique interpretation. The sole original on the record, "Fall Colours" (credited to both writers, although the Canadian spelling may reveal the true author), is based on the standard "Autumn Leaves." Abercrombie sounds fine here, if at times pretty rather than substantial. He prefers to play in long single-note lines, rather than taking the more chordal approach many guitarists attempt in such a stripped-down setting. Thompson is a highly interactive bass player with enviable technique, allowing him to play melodic, fluid solos throughout. There seem to be several sound problems on Witchcraft; the recording level is very low, and a rattling sound often accompanies the musicians' louder notes, which grows to be quite distracting on repeated listenings.

== Track listing ==
No.	Title	Writer(s)	Length
1.	"Ev'rything I Love"	Cole Porter	5:59
2.	"Somethime Ago"	Sergio Mihanovich	5:33
3.	"Witchcraft"	Cy Coleman, Carolyn Leigh	6:04
4.	"My Foolish Heart"	Ned Washington, Victor Young	8:50
5.	"Fall Colours"	John Abercrombie, Don Thompson	6:11
6.	"I'm Getting Sentimental Over You"	George Bassman, Ned Washington	5:56
7.	"Peace"	Horace Silver	5:41
8.	"You'd Be So Nice to Come Home To"	Cole Porter	7:00
9.	"You Don't Know What Love Is"	Gene DePaul, Don Raye	8:43
Total length:			59:46

== Personnel ==
- John Abercrombie – guitar
- Don Thompson – double bass, piano
