= If We May =

Studio album by Paul Bley Trio
- Released: 1994
- Recorded: April 1993
- Genre: Jazz
- Length: 55:47
- Label: SteepleChase SCCD 31344
- Producer: Nils Winther

Paul Bley chronology
Hands On (1993)	If We May (1994)	Sweet Time (1993)

If We May is an album of jazz standards by pianist Paul Bley recorded in 1993 and released on the SteepleChase label.

== Reception ==
Professional ratings
Review scores
Source	Rating
Allmusic	4/5 stars
The Penguin Guide to Jazz Recordings	3.5/4 stars

Allmusic awarded the album 4 stars, stating, "The music is quite accessible to straightahead fans even if Bley gives these warhorses some new twists, and he shows that he can swing with the best of them (not that anyone really doubted it)".

== Track listing ==
1. "Long Ago (And Far Away)" (Ira Gershwin, Jerome Kern) - 9:36
2. "Don't Explain" (Billie Holiday, Arthur Herzog, Jr.) - 9:43
3. "If We May" (Paul Bley) - 10:08
4. "Indian Summer" (Al Dubin, Victor Herbert) - 5:59
5. "All the Things You Are" (Oscar Hammerstein II, Jerome Kern) - 9:26
6. "Goodbye" (Gordon Jenkins) - 5:12
7. "Confirmation" (Charlie Parker) - 5:55

== Personnel ==
- Paul Bley - piano
- Jay Anderson - bass
- Adam Nussbaum - drums
