= Current Events (album) =

Studio album by John Abercrombie
- Released: 1986
- Recorded: September 1985
- Studio: Rainbow; Oslo, Norway
- Genre: Jazz
- Length: 48:41
- Label: ECM 1311
- Producer: Manfred Eicher

John Abercrombie chronology
Night (1984)	Current Events (1986)	Emerald City (1987)

Current Events is a studio album by jazz guitarist John Abercrombie, recorded in September 1985 and released on ECM Records in 1986. The trio features rhythm section Marc Johnson and Peter Erskine.

== Reception ==
Professional ratings
Review scores
Source	Rating
AllMusic	4/5 stars
The Penguin Guide to Jazz	3.5/4 stars

The AllMusic review by Ron Wynn stated: "The three take chances, converge, collide, alternate time in the spotlight, and make emphatic, unpredictable music while never staying locked into one groove or style."

The Penguin Guide to Jazz awarded the album 3 1/2 stars, stating, "Current Events, which introduces two of the guitarist's most sympathetic and responsive partners, is still a very strong statement."

== Track listing ==
All tracks are written by John Abercrombie except where noted.

No.	Title	Writer(s)	Length
1.	"Clint"	Abercrombie; Erskine; Johnson	6:06
2.	"Alice in Wonderland"	Sammy Fain; Bob Hilliard	8:42
3.	"Ralph's Piano Waltz"		6:15
4.	"Lisa"		2:28
5.	"Hippityville"		8:22
6.	"Killing Time"		7:52
7.	"Still"		8:56
Total length:			48:41

== Personnel ==
- John Abercrombie – guitar, guitar synthesizer
- Marc Johnson – double bass
- Peter Erskine – drums
