= Open Land =

Studio album by John Abercrombie
- Released: June 9, 1999
- Recorded: September 1998
- Studio: Avatar, New York City
- Genre: Jazz
- Length: 64:56
- Label: ECM; ECM 1683
- Producer: Manfred Eicher

John Abercrombie chronology
Tactics (1997)	Open Land (1999)	Cat 'n' Mouse (2002)

Open Land is an album by American jazz guitarist John Abercrombie, recorded in September 1998 and released on ECM Records in June 1999. The sextet features trumpeter Kenny Wheeler, saxophonist Joe Lovano, violinist Mark Feldman, organist Dan Wall, and drummer Adam Nussbaum.

== Reception ==
Professional ratings
Review scores
Source	Rating
AllMusic	4/5 stars
The Penguin Guide to Jazz	3.5/4 stars

The AllMusic review by Richard S. Ginell called the album "an absorbing set of elegantly textured, poly-styled music laced with his drifting, occasionally jagged yet never overbearing guitar."

The Penguin Guide to Jazz stated: "Like most current ECM sets, this feels very much like a collaborative project rather than a leader-plus-group; but Abercrombie does seem firmly, quietly in charge here, steering the performances in his distinctive hard to define way."

== Track listing ==
All tracks are written by John Abercrombie except where noted.

No.	Title	Writer(s)	Length
1.	"Just in Tune"		6:35
2.	"Open Land"		10:08
3.	"Spring Song"		8:59
4.	"Gimme Five"		7:23
5.	"Speak Easy"		6:43
6.	"Little Booker"		6:13
7.	"Free Piece Suit(e)"	Abercrombie; Nussbaum; Wall; Lovano; Wheeler; Feldman	6:53
8.	"Remember When"		7:57
9.	"That's for Sure"		4:05

== Personnel ==
- John Abercrombie – guitar
- Kenny Wheeler – trumpet, flugelhorn
- Joe Lovano – tenor saxophone
- Mark Feldman – violin
- Dan Wall – Hammond organ
- Adam Nussbaum – drums
