= 39 Steps (album) =

Studio album by the John Abercrombie Quartet
- Released: September 30, 2013
- Recorded: April 2013
- Studio: Avatar (New York, New York)
- Genre: Jazz
- Length: 59:36
- Label: ECM 2334
- Producer: Manfred Eicher

John Abercrombie chronology
Within a Song (2012)	39 Steps (2013)	Up and Coming (2017)

39 Steps is an album by the John Abercrombie Quartet, recorded in April 2013 and released on ECM Records later that year. The quartet features rhythm section Marc Copland, Drew Gress, and Joey Baron.

== Reception ==
Professional ratings
Review scores
Source	Rating
AllMusic	4/5 stars

The AllMusic review by Thom Jurek states, "Abercrombie's 39 Steps offers the sound of a veteran quartet playing at the height of its individual members' intuitive and collective abilities."

On All About Jazz Andrew Luhn said:

Fans of Abercrombie's playing won't be disappointed by this album and neither will fans of the ECM record label. It's a great addition to his growing body of work and Marc Copland proves to be a good choice with whom Abercrombie can collaborate

— Luhn, A. (October 14, 2013). "All About Jazz Review".

Also on All About Jazz, John Kelman noted:

As good as their previous recordings together have been, 39 Steps represents a major leap forward for Abercrombie and Copland's relationship, even as the guitarist returns to the piano-based configuration that was his first touring context, back in the late '70s.

— Kelman, J. (October 8, 2013). "All About Jazz Review".

== Track listing ==
All tracks are written by John Abercrombie except where noted.

No.	Title	Writer(s)	Length
1.	"Vertigo"		6:21
2.	"LST"	Marc Copland	6:51
3.	"Bacharach"		7:21
4.	"Greenstreet"		6:15
5.	"As It Stands"		4:08
6.	"Spellbound"	Copland	6:53
7.	"Another Ralph's"		5:22
8.	"Shadow of a Doubt"	John Abercrombie; Copland; Joey Baron; Drew Gress	3:12
9.	"39 Steps"		8:36
10.	"Melancholy Baby"	Ernie Burnett; George A. Norton	4:37

== Personnel ==
- John Abercrombie – guitar
- Marc Copland – piano
- Drew Gress – double bass
- Joey Baron – drums
