= Rudy Linka =

Czech jazz guitarist

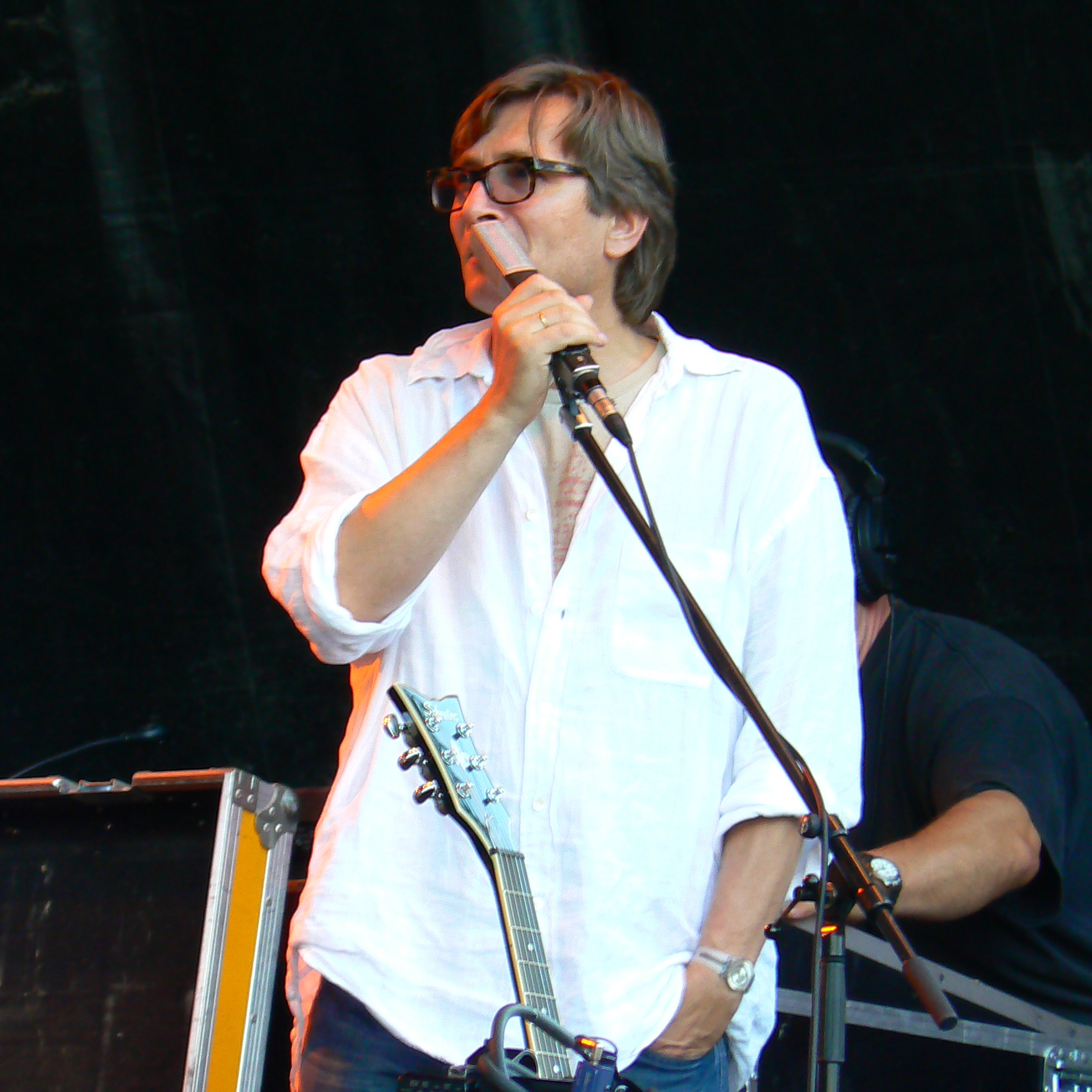
- Rudy Linka as director of the Bohemia Jazz Fest

Background information
- Born: 29 May 1960 (age 65); Prague, Czechoslovakia
- Genres: Jazz
- Occupation: Musician
- Instrument: Guitar
- Label: Enja
- Website: www.rudylinka.cz

Rudy Linka (born 29 May 1960) is a Czech jazz guitarist.

== Biography ==
From 1975 to 1979, he studied classical guitar as a teenager at the Prague Conservatory and learned jazz through his mentor, Karel Velebný. After travelling to Germany in 1980, he defected to the West in Sweden. In the first half of the 1980s, he studied composition and classical guitar at the Stockholm Music Institute. While in Sweden he began his collaboration with American double bassist Red Mitchell.

In 1985 he moved to Boston and attended the Berklee College of Music. The following year he moved to New York City, where he studied at the New School for Jazz and Contemporary Music with John Abercrombie, Dave Liebman, and Arnie Lawrence. He studied privately with guitarists Jim Hall and John Scofield and before leading his own group.

Linka has performed and recorded with Jon Batiste, Larry Grenadier, Gil Goldstein, Paul Motian, Bob Mintzer, John Scofield, John Abercrombie, Kenny Wollesen, and Marvin "Smitty" Smith on labels such as Timeless, Enja, Sony BMG, and Universal. In 1998 he was voted one of the ten best guitarists by the readers of Down Beat magazine.

Linka is the founder and artistic director of the Bohemia Jazz Fest which takes place every July in the Czech Republic.

== Discography ==
- Rudy Linka Quartet (Arta, 1991)
- News from Home (Arta, 1992)
- Mostly Standards (Arta, 1993)
- Live It Up (Timeless, 1993)
- Czech It Out (Enja, 1994)
- Always Double Czech (Enja, 1997)
- Emotions in Motion (1999)
- Just Between Us (Universal, 2000)
- Every Moment (Acoustic Music Records, 2001)
- Simple Pleasures (Midlantic, 2002)
- Trip (JV, 2005)
- Lucky Southern (Quinton, 2006)
- Beyond the New York City Limits (2006)
- Songs with Paul Motian and Larry Grenadier (Sony, 2008)
- Re:Connect (MIC, 2013)
- Acoustic & Electric (2015)
- American Trailer (MIC, 2017)
- Live (MIC, 2022)
