= John Abercrombie / Marc Johnson / Peter Erskine =

Live album by John Abercrombie
- Released: April 1989
- Recorded: April 21, 1988
- Venue: Nightstage, Boston, Massachusetts, US
- Genre: Jazz
- Length: 61:51
- Label: ECM
- Producer: Manfred Eicher

John Abercrombie chronology
Upon a Time (1989)	John Abercrombie / Marc Johnson / Peter Erskine (1989)	Animato (1990)

John Abercrombie / Marc Johnson / Peter Erskine is a live album by American jazz guitarist John Abercrombie, recorded at the Nightstage in Boston on April 21, 1988 and released on ECM Records the following year. The trio features rhythm section Marc Johnson and Peter Erskine.

== Reception ==
Professional ratings
Review scores
Source	Rating
AllMusic	4.5/5 stars
The Penguin Guide to Jazz	3/4 stars
The Virgin Encyclopedia of Jazz	4/5 stars

The AllMusic review by Ron Wynn states, "The trio sometimes unite for piercing interpretations as on 'Stella by Starlight' and other times collide and interact on furious rhythm dialogues and extended improvisations."

The Penguin Guide to Jazz said, "Not known as a big standards player Abercrombie turns in a beautiful 'Stella by Starlight' here, perfectly weighted this side of sentimentality, and an unforgettable version of the less well-known Dietz/Schwartz 'Haunted Heart'. Johnson and Erskine make a convincing team."

== Track listing ==
No.	Title	Writer(s)	Length
1.	"Furs on Ice"	Johnson	7:28
2.	"Stella by Starlight"	Ned Washington; Victor Young	7:34
3.	"Alice in Wonderland"	Sammy Fain; Bob Hilliard	7:22
4.	"Beautiful Love"	Haven Gillespie; Wayne King; Egbert Van Alstyne; Victor Young	7:55
5.	"Innerplay"	Abercrombie; Erskine; Johnson	5:35
6.	"Light Beam"	Abercrombie	3:08
7.	"Drum Solo"	Erskine	3:00
8.	"Four on One"	Abercrombie	6:03
9.	"Samurai Hee-Haw"	Johnson	8:22
10.	"Haunted Heart"	Howard Dietz; Arthur Schwartz	5:26
Total length:			61:51

== Personnel ==
- John Abercrombie – guitar, guitar synthesizer
- Marc Johnson – bass
- Peter Erskine – drums

=== Technical personnel ===
- Tony Romano – live engineer
- Jan Erik Kongshaug – remix engineer
- Barbara Wojirsch – cover design
- Manfred Eicher – producer
