= Harri Stojka =

Austrian musician

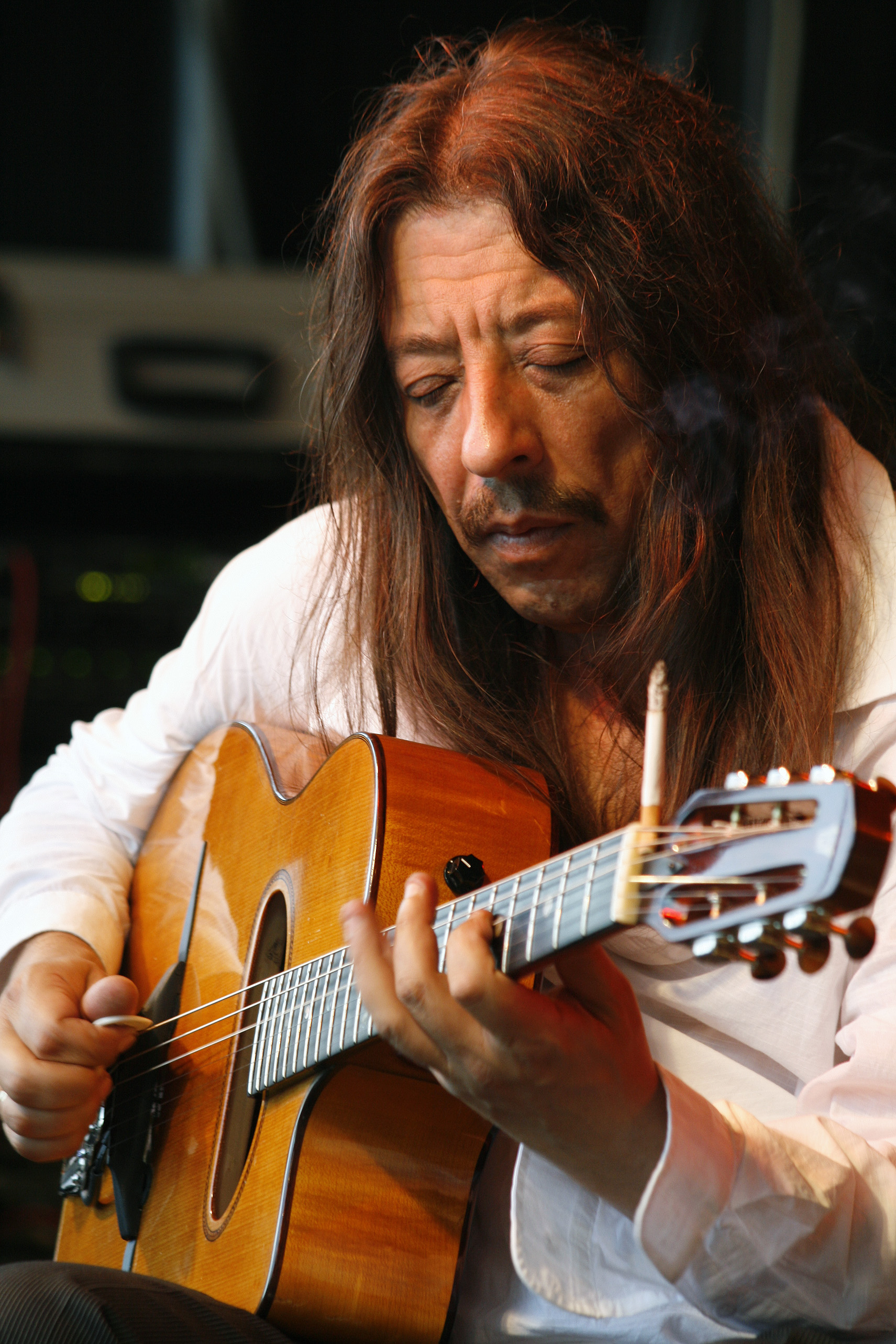
Harri Stojka (Vienna 2008)

Harri Stojka (born 22 July 1957 in Vienna) is a Viennese jazz guitarist. He comes from the diasporic Lovara-Roma dynasty of the Bagareschtschi clan.

In the 1980s he played in Montreux with the likes of Larry Coryell and Biréli Lagrène. Nowadays he enjoys playing Gypsy jazz which is close to his roots.

Stojka's cousin is jazz guitarist Karl Ratzer.

== Discography ==
- Off the Bone (WEA, 1980)
- Live at Montreux (WEA, 1981)
- Camera (WEA, 1981)
- Tight (WEA, 1982)
- Brother to Brother (WEA, 1985)
- Live (Spray 1987)
- Say Yes (JMS, 1989)
- Harri Stojka (Gipsy, 1996)
- Kunst Im Grauen Haus 1998 with Rudi Wilfer (Rst, 1998)
- Gitancoeur (2000)
- Unplugged (2002)
- Live at the Roma Wedding (2004)
- A Tribute to Swing (2004)
- Garude Apsa (2005)
- 98 86 (Gipsy, 2005)
- In Between (Pate, 2009)
- Gitancoeur D'Europe (EmArcy/Universal, 2011)
- India Express (Gipsy, 2012)
- A Tribute to the Beatles (Lotus 2016)
- Other Doors (Lotus, 2017)
- Psycho Guitar (Gipsy, 2019)
