= Structures (John Abercrombie album) =

Studio album by John Abercrombie
- Released: August 15, 2006
- Recorded: March 6–7, 2006
- Studio: St. Peter's Episcopal Church, New York City
- Genre: Jazz
- Length: 60:18
- Label: Chesky
- Producer: Charles Carlini, David Chesky

John Abercrombie chronology
Class Trip (2004)	Structures (2006)	The Third Quartet (2007)

Professional ratings
Review scores
Source	Rating
Allmusic	4.5/5 stars
The Penguin Guide to Jazz Recordings	4/4 stars

Structures is a studio album by guitarist John Abercrombie with bassist Eddie Gómez and drummer Gene Jackson. The album was released on August 15, 2006, by Chesky Records as part of The New York Sessions series.

== Reception ==
Ken Dryden of Allmusic wrote a positive review, stating that "This inspired trio session was recorded with the musicians sharing a single microphone, making for a particularly intimate listening experience. Guitarist John Abercrombie has never sounded better, displaying the subtle lyricism that is only one facet of his musical personality, while bassist Eddie Gómez is his usual fluid self and drummer Gene Jackson adds a soft touch, frequently sticking to brushes. Gómez opens the tasty "The Touch of Your Lips" with a warm arco solo, switching back to pizzicato as the trio gains steam. Their hushed interpretation of "Moon and Sand" is stunning, as is the understated bossa nova setting of Cole Porter's "Everything I Love." Their arrangement of Bill Evans' ballad "Turn Out the Stars" (which Gómez undoubtedly played hundreds of times during his 11-plus-year tenure with the pianist) is more straight-ahead and less dramatic than its composer's conception, though no less enticing. Originals by Abercrombie and Gómez also prove to be excellent vehicles for the trio's musical explorations. Highly recommended.

== Track listing ==
No.	Title	Writer(s)	Length
1.	"Jazz Folk"	John Abercrombie	9:31
2.	"The Touch of Your Lips"	Ray Noble	4:55
3.	"Moon and Sand"	Alec Wilder, Morty Palitz, William Engvick	5:28
4.	"Walter Pigeon"	Eddie Gomez	5:18
5.	"Everything I Love"	Cole Porter	6:41
6.	"Embraceable You"	George Gershwin / Ira Gershwin	6:07
7.	"3 for Three"	John Abercrombie	6:15
8.	"Turn out the Stars"	Bill Evans	5:29
9.	"Missing You"	Eddie Gomez	4:46
10.	"How Deep Is the Ocean"	Irving Berlin	5:48
Total length:			1:00:18

== Personnel ==
- John Abercrombie – guitar
- Eddie Gómez – double bass
- Gene Jackson – drums
