= Bohemia JazzFest =

Jazz festival in the Czech Republic

Bohemia Jazz Fest
- Genre: Jazz
- Coordinates: 50°05′N 14°28′E
- Years active: 2005–present
- Founders: Rudy Linka
- Website: bohemiajazzfest.cz/en

Bohemia Jazz Fest is an annual jazz festival in the Czech Republic. It was started in 2005 by Czech-born jazz guitarist Rudy Linka. The festival travels to different historic squares in cities throughout the country during the month of July, beginning on Prague's Old Town Square, and ending in České Budějovice. In the past, Bohemia Jazz Fest has visited Prachatice, Domažlice, Plzeň, Tábor and Brno.

== Media ==
Bohemia Jazz Fest is featured in Michelin's Prague 2012 guide. It has also been featured in Downbeat magazine, as well as New York Times' blog "In Transit."

== Performers ==
Past performers include:

- Larry Carlton
- Stanley Clarke
- Tom Harrell
- Roy Haynes
- Charles Lloyd
- John Patitucci
- Danilo Perez
- Chris Potter
- Terje Rypdal
- John Scofield
- Lonnie Smith
- McCoy Tyner
- Yellowjackets
