= Night (John Abercrombie album) =

Studio album by John Abercrombie
- Released: November 20, 1984
- Recorded: April 1984
- Studio: Power Station, New York City
- Genre: Jazz
- Length: 41:29
- Label: ECM 1272
- Producer: Manfred Eicher

John Abercrombie chronology
Solar (1984)	Night (1984)	Current Events (1986)

Night is an album by guitarist John Abercrombie, recorded in 1984 and released on ECM Records in November of that year. The quartet features saxophonist Michael Brecker, keyboardist Jan Hammer, and drummer Jack DeJohnette.

== Reception ==
Professional ratings
Review scores
Source	Rating
AllMusic	4.5/5 stars
The Penguin Guide to Jazz	3/4 stars
The Rolling Stone Jazz Record Guide	3/5 stars

The AllMusic review by Daniel Gioffre stated: "This record is the kind of album that one would like to hear while enjoying a late-night cigarette on the roof of a Manhattan apartment. Moody, atmospheric, and beautiful."

The Penguin Guide to Jazz awarded the album 3 stars, stating, "Night demonstrated two things: first, that Abercrombie had outgrown the association with Hammer in particular, probably because increasingly he could give those evocative keyboard figures his own spin, using pedals and later, guitar synth; and secondly, that he never sounds entirely easy in the company of a horn player whose main strength is rapid fire changes."

The ECM website states that the album stands out in the ECM catalogue: "Though something of an blip in the Abercrombie back catalogue, Night is far from benign. Aside from the effusive music, what really distinguishes this album is its sound. Another slam-dunk for engineer Jan Erik Kongshaug."

== Track listing ==
All tracks are written by John Abercrombie except where noted.

No.	Title	Writer(s)	Length
1.	"Ethereggae"	Jan Hammer	8:28
2.	"Night"		5:02
3.	"3 East"		4:33
4.	"Look Around"		9:02
5.	"Believe You Me"		7:42
6.	"Four On One"		6:42

== Personnel ==
- John Abercrombie – guitar
- Michael Brecker – tenor saxophone
- Jan Hammer – keyboards
- Jack DeJohnette – drums
