= Marc Copland =

American jazz pianist and composer

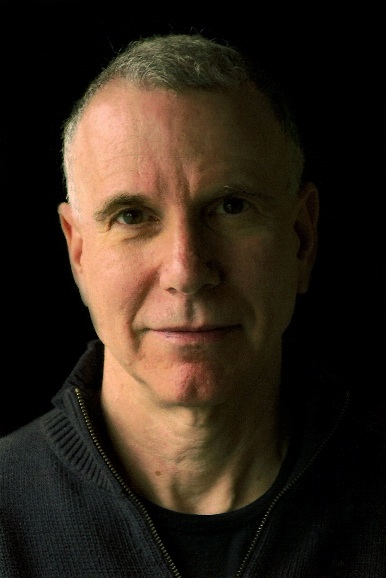
- Marc Copland, November 2007

Background information
- Born: May 27, 1948 (age 77); Philadelphia, Pennsylvania, U.S.
- Genres: Jazz
- Occupation: Musician
- Instrument: Piano
- Years active: 1960s–present
- Label: Jazz City
- Website: marccopland.com

Marc Copland (/ˈkoʊplənd/, KOHP-lənd; born May 27, 1948, as Marc Cohen) is an American jazz pianist and composer. Copland became part of the jazz scene in Philadelphia in the early 1960s as a saxophonist, and later moved to New York City, where he experimented with electric alto saxophone. In the early 1970s, while pursuing his own harmonic concept, he grew dissatisfied with what he felt were inherent limitations in the saxophone and moved to the Baltimore-Washington, D.C., area, where he remained for a decade to retrain as a jazz pianist. He returned to New York in the mid-1980s. He has since become noted for his highly developed, colorful use of abstract harmony, often using unusual polychords and elements from atonal music. Mel Minter writes that Copland "excels at painting abstract sonic atmospheres".

== Early years and training ==
Copland was born on May 27, 1948, in Philadelphia, Pennsylvania. He began taking piano lessons at age seven, but stopped abruptly at the age of ten when his public school offered the option of saxophone training. Beginning his career on alto sax, Copland became part of a vibrant music scene in his hometown in the early 1960s, learning and playing with Michael Brecker, a close friend and fellow high school student. In 1965 he briefly studied harmony with Romeo Cascarino in Philadelphia and also began training in composition with Meyer Kupferman and studied saxophone with Joseph Allard, both in New York.

== Career ==
In 1966, Copland moved to New York City, where he attended Columbia University. At Columbia, he played in a band with Armen Donelian and Sam Morrison. He became part of a late 1960s and early 1970s New York jazz scene that expanded from the traditional clubs into lofts around the city. During this period, Copland was, along with John Abercrombie and Glen Moore, a member of the Chico Hamilton Quartet. He experimented by adding electronic processors to his alto, culminating in the recording of Friends, an electric jazz album produced by a small New York City start-up label, Oblivion. This album, with Abercrombie, Clint Houston, and Jeff Williams, achieved a kind of cult status, earning a five-star review in Down Beat magazine.

Increasingly, however, Copland was writing music with more complex chords that suggested to him an approach to music very different from his acoustic and electronic saxophone work. He came to feel that as an instrument, the saxophone was not a suitable vehicle to fully express his musical imagination. By 1973, he had decided to switch to piano.

For the next decade, Copland labored in Washington, D.C., and Baltimore in relative obscurity while mastering his new instrument. During this period he underwent a kind of apprenticeship, playing with well-known musicians passing through the area who asked for him as an accompanist. Backing up different musicians one week to the next, he worked with artists such as Randy Brecker, Bob Berg, Hank Crawford, Art Farmer, Curtis Fuller, Tom Harrell, Eddie Harris, Harold Land and Blue Mitchell, Dave Liebman, Bob Mintzer, Gary Peacock, and Sonny Stitt. During this time he also led his own bands in local clubs, playing with many of the musicians who lived and worked in the area. One of these, bassist Drew Gress, later moved to New York and over the years has become one of Copland's chief musical collaborators.

In the early 1980s, Copland returned to New York. For a time he returned weekly to Washington to continue private teaching and a steady trio engagement, but after a couple of years these regular visits tapered off in favor of more extensive work in New York City. During this period he worked with Bob Belden, Jane Ira Bloom, Joe Lovano, Herbie Mann, James Moody (with whom he toured for three years), John Scofield, Jim Snidero, and Dave Stryker. A busy sideman, he began to appear with his own bands in local clubs, but remained unrecorded as a leader. Acting on a tip that the Japanese label Jazz City was searching for ten American pianists, Copland sent an audition tape to guitarist/producer Yoshiaki Masuo. After listening, the producer called Copland to decline, saying that the label had already reached agreement with ten pianists. A few weeks later Masuo called back to say one pianist had dropped out, and offered Copland his first record deal. My Foolish Heart, Copland's debut disc as leader, was recorded at "The Studio" in Soho. His trio and quartet gigs and were more frequent, and as word of his trio spread, he began to play regularly at several venues around the United States, first with Peacock and drummer Bill Stewart, and later, when Stewart was no longer with the original trio, with Billy Hart.

In the 1990s, on the recommendation of Peter Erskine and John Abercrombie, Copland recorded with Vince Mendoza, in the process making the acquaintance of Japanese producer Takao Ogawa. A few years later Ogawa and Copland bumped into each other in a New York studio, agreeing to meet to discuss recording possibilities. Ogawa subsequently organized and produced Stompin' with Savoy (Savoy), featuring an all-star quintet including fellow Philadelphian Randy Brecker and Bob Berg. Because of the limited distribution in the U.S. of his previous CDs, this release effectively became Copland's American debut. It garnered high praise in the American press, which cited his unique way of re-interpreting the standard repertoire, an approach which was widely copied by younger musicians later in the decade. The release led to three years of touring with the quintet in major clubs around the country. Savoy recorded three other albums, as well as a fourth CD that was never released.

The Savoy jazz catalog was largely inactive in the late 1990s, and for a couple of years Copland went unrecorded. But In the mid-nineties Copland had begun touring Europe with his own groups, first in duo with John Abercrombie, and later in trios and quartets. As a result, at the beginning of the millennium several European labels took an interest and began to document his work. These recordings solidified his position as a leading and original voice on his instrument in various contexts; each disc was greeted enthusiastically by the press. His work from 2000 to 2006 can be divided into solo piano work, duos, trios, and quartets.

In 2001, French producer Philippe Ghielmetti heard Copland with his trio in Paris, and invited him to record his debut solo piano album. The album featured almost all Copland originals. Three years later, Swiss producer Werner Uehlinger followed. In Poetic Motion, references to Bill Zavatsky's poem of the same title are everywhere. In Time Within Time Copland wrote his own verse, which helped unify the theme of "time" that is present in the CD title, the cover photograph, and the musical titles and content.

For years, the duo in jazz was a rarely seen ensemble. Copland concentrated on this somewhat neglected format in many of his recordings between 2000 and 2005. His partners on the various projects played diverse instruments, including alto sax, soprano and tenor sax, guitar, bass, and trumpet. A final duo release from this period featured Copland in duets with another pianist with a harmonically advanced bent, the American Bill Carrothers:

Perhaps the album most responsible for opening the door to wider public acceptance for Copland during the new millennium was his return to the trio format with his regular working band of the period, with Drew Gress on bass and Jochen Rueckert on drums. The album was an application of the pianist's lyrical bent to the interpretation of ballads, a song form that lends itself naturally to his style. The trio developed the rapport evident on the album through several years of steady gigs in New York, and USA and European tours. Another and very different trio, with Kenny Wheeler and John Abercrombie, was a meeting of three individualist instrumentalists and composers. This latter trio recorded twice, and also toured Europe frequently.

In the nineties, Copland wrote and arranged extensively for his quintet and quartet; he returned to this format with four CDs in the 2000s.

During this period Copland recorded exclusively for Pirouet. His output during this period included mostly trios, but also duos, quartets, and a quintet album. Some Love Songs recalls his earlier ballad disc Haunted Heart, with the same trio of Gress and Rueckert. Beginning with Modinha, the pianist embarked on the three-volume "NY Trio Series"; he later returned to the trio of Gress and Rueckert for "Some More Love Songs."

== Discography ==
=== As leader and solo recordings ===
- 1988 My Foolish Heart (Jazz City) with Gary Peacock, John Abercrombie, Jeff Hirshfield
- 1992 At Night (Sunnyside)
- 1992 Two Way Street with Dieter Ilg (Jazzline)
- 1995 Stompin' with Savoy (Savoy)
- 1996 Second Look (Savoy)
- 1997 Paradiso (Soul Note)
- 1998 Softly (Savoy)
- 2000 Between the Lines with Tim Hagans (Steeplechase)
- 2001 Double Play with Vic Juris (Steeplechase)
- 2001 That's for Sure with John Abercrombie, Kenny Wheeler (Challenge)
- 2001 Poetic Motion (Sketch)
- 2001 Haunted Heart and Other Ballads (Hathut)
- 2002 Bookends with Dave Liebman (Hathut)
- 2002 Lunar with Dave Liebman (Hathut)
- 2002 Songs without End with Ralph Towner
- 2002 Round and Round with Greg Osby (Nagel-Heyer)
- 2003 Night Call with Greg Osby (Nagel-Heyer)
- 2003 Marc Copland and... (Hatology)
- 2004 What It Says with Gary Peacock (Sketch)
- 2004 Both/And with Randy Brecker (Nagel-Heyer)
- 2004 Brand New with John Abercrombie, Kenny Wheeler (Challenge)
- 2005 Some Love Songs (Pirouet)
- 2005 Time within Time (Hatology)
- 2006 New York Trio Recordings, Vol. 1: Modinha (Pirouet)
- 2006 No Choice with Bill Carrothers
- 2007 New York Trio Recordings, Vol. 2: Voices (Pirouet)
- 2008 Another Place (Pirouet)
- 2009 New York Trio Recordings, Vol. 3: Night Whispers (Pirouet)
- 2009 Insight with Gary Peacock (Pirouet)
- 2009 Alone (Pirouet)
- 2011 Crosstalk (Pirouet)
- 2011 Speak to Me with John Abercrombie (Pirouet)
- 2012 Some More Love Songs (Pirouet)
- 2015 Le Long de La Plage with Michel Butor (Harmonia Mundi)
- 2015 Zenith
- 2017 More Essentials Daniel Schlappi (Catwalk)
- 2017 When the Birds Leave with Robin Verheyen, Drew Gress, Billy Hart (Universal)
- 2017 Better by Far with Ralph Alessi, Drew Gress, Joey Baron (InnerVoice Jazz)
- 2018 Gary
- 2019 Alice's Wonderland
- 2020 John
- 2022 Someday with Robin Verheyen, Drew Gress, Mark Ferber (Inner Voice Jazz)

=== As sideman ===
With John Abercrombie

- 2013 39 Steps (ECM)
- 2017 Up and Coming (ECM)

With Bob Belden

- 1991 Straight to My Heart
- 1990 Treasure Island
- 1996 Shades of Blue
- 2001 Black Dahlia
- 2006 Three Days of Rain

With Ethel Ennis

- 1994 Ethel Ennis
- 1998 If Women Ruled the World

With Tim Hagans

- 1993 No Words
- 2006 Beautiful Lily
- 2008 Alone Together

With Steve LaSpina

- 1992 New Horizon
- 1994 Eclipse
- 1995 When I'm Alone

With Ron McClure

- 1996 Concrete Canyon
- 1997 Closer to Your Tears
- 1999 Double Triangle

With Gary Peacock Trio

- 2015 Now This
- 2017 Tangents

With Dave Stryker

- 1994 Strike Zone
- 2000 Shades of Miles

With Stan Sulzmann

- 1992 Never at All
- 2004 The Jigsaw

With others

- 1991 Urban Tales, Jim Snidero
- 1994 What's Goin' On Dieter Ilg
- 1993 Amethyst, Billy Hart (Arabesque)
- 1993 Penumbra, Ahmad Mansour
- 1995 Third Ear, Rez Abbasi
- 1996 Under the Influence, Kim Pensyl
- 1997 The Gift, Gordon Brisker
- 1997 Blue Porpoise Avenue, Glenn Wilson
- 2001 B-A-C-H: A Chromatic Universe, Peter Herbert
- 2002 Samba Jazz Fantasia, Duduka da Fonseca
- 2005 Beginning, Eumir Deodato
- 2012 Reflets, Michel El Malem
- 2012 El Gaucho, Jeanfrançois Prins
- 2020 Giulia, Francesco Cataldo
- 2021 Dedications, Michel El Malem
