= Upon a Time =

Studio album by John Abercrombie
- Released: 1989
- Recorded: 1982
- Studio: Arch Studios, Berkeley, California
- Genre: Jazz
- Length: 1:09:11
- Label: New Albion
- Producer: John Abercrombie

John Abercrombie chronology
Getting There (1988)	Upon a Time (1989)	John Abercrombie / Marc Johnson / Peter Erskine (1989)

Professional ratings
Review scores
Source	Rating
Allmusic	2/5 stars

Upon a Time is a studio album by American jazz guitarist John Abercrombie with drummer George Marsh, with additional tracks performed by Marsh and bassist Mel Graves. The album was recorded in California in 1982 and released by New Albion Records in 1989.

The first ten tracks, featuring Abercrombie and Marsh, were originally released as the album Drum Strum on 1750 Arch Records; the remaining tracks with Marsh and Graves were taken from Marshland on the same label.

== Reception ==
A reviewer of Allmusic awarded the album two stars out of five, stating "John Abercrombie's 1989 release Upon a Time is, as the subtitle points out, an album of duets, mostly with bassist Mel Graves and drummer George Marsh. While bass and drum solos are often the punchlines of musical jokes, Graves and Marsh are skilled players with enough good taste to keep the flashiness to an interesting minimum. As for guitarist Abercrombie, his playing is typically brilliant, whether picking out the traditional melody of 'My Scottish Heart' or moving into a more impressionistic sonic arena in tracks like 'In the Woods' or 'Chuck Man Rivers.' Earthier and more expressly jazz-based than many releases on the ECM-affiliated New Albion label, Upon a Time is a satisfying, richly rewarding album."

== Track listing ==
All tracks are written by John Abercrombie and George Marsh except where noted.

No.	Title	Writer(s)	Length
1.	"My Scottish Heart"		5:30
2.	"Muchacha Dorada"		5:37
3.	"Upon a Time"	Abercrombie	3:10
4.	"In the Woods"	Marsh	6:10
5.	"Demi-Saison"	Abercrombie	3:38
6.	"Baby Lucille"		5:56
7.	"Vincent"		8:23
8.	"Count"		2:53
9.	"Chuck Man Rivers"		2:39
10.	"Camel Walk"	Abercrombie	4:21
11.	"Play It Again"	Marsh	2:50
12.	"Moonfire"	Graves	2:30
13.	"Gypsy Wand Song"	Graves	5:56
14.	"McNabb the Crabb"	Graves	2:19
15.	"Chelsea Bridge"	Billy Strayhorn	5:48
16.	"Lullaby of the Leaves"	Bernice Petkere, Joe Young	2:34
Total length:			01:09:11

== Personnel ==
- John Abercrombie – electric guitar, mandolin, mando-guitar, piano (tracks 1–10)
- Mel Graves – double bass, bass guitar (tracks 11–16)
- George Marsh – drums, percussion, thumb piano
