= Tangents (album) =

Studio album by the Gary Peacock Trio
- Released: June 9, 2017
- Recorded: May 2016
- Studio: Auditorio Stelio Molo RSI; Lugano, Switzerland
- Genre: Jazz
- Length: 53:04
- Label: ECM; ECM 2533
- Producer: Manfred Eicher

Gary Peacock chronology
Now This (2015)	Tangents (2017)

Professional ratings
Review scores
Source	Rating
All About Jazz	4.5/5 stars
The Irish Times	4/5 stars
Jazz Forum	5/5 stars
PopMatters	6/10 stars
RTÉ.ie	4/5 stars
The Times	3/5 stars
Tom Hull	B+

Tangents is a studio album by the Gary Peacock Trio recorded in Switzerland in May 2016 and released on ECM June the following year—his final album as leader. The trio features pianist Marc Copland and drummer Joey Baron.

== Reception ==
Britt Robson of JazzTimes stated "That ambiance of received wisdom, of patient certainty, permeates Tangents."

Cormac Larkin in his review for The Irish Times mentioned, "A set of mostly Peacock compositions—with Alex North’s love theme from Spartacus and Miles Davis’s classic Blue in Green thrown in for good measure – veers from ruminative abstraction to tender lyricism to joyous swing without losing the intense focus of three old hands, masters of their respective instruments, who have the courage and the humility to let the music decide where it wants to go."

Karl Ackermann of All About Jazz added, "At eighty-two years of age, one need only listen to 'Rumblin'' to hear Peacock solo like the ageless wonder that he is."

Derek Taylor of Dusted wrote, "The band’s second date for ECM, Tangents is right on par with the first in presenting each of the three players in the best possible setting, acoustically and creatively. Copland and Baron are significantly younger than their employer and colleague, but seniority registers little if no meaning in the context of music as ageless as this. Peacock is careful not to allow any of the eleven pieces to gather any figurative moss or collected dust. His warm and responsive strings are central in the sound spectrum with frequent solos that fold seamlessly into the trajectories of the tunes without disrupting the flow. Copland and Baron are just as centered."

== Track listing ==
All tracks are written by Gary Peacock except as noted.

No.	Title	Writer(s)	Length
1.	"Contact"		6:39
2.	"December Greenwings"		4:50
3.	"Tempei Tempo"		4:10
4.	"Cauldron"	Joey Baron	2:29
5.	"Spartacus"	Alex North	5:10
6.	"Empty Forest"	Baron; Marc Copland; Peacock	7:11
7.	"Blue in Green"	Miles Davis	4:42
8.	"Rumblin'"		4:07
9.	"Talkin' Blues"	Copland	4:04
10.	"In and Out"	Baron	2:52
11.	"Tangents"		6:50
Total length:			53:04

== Personnel ==
=== Gary Peacock Trio ===
- Marc Copland – piano
- Gary Peacock – double-bass
- Joey Baron – drums
