= Within a Song =

Studio album by John Abercrombie Quartet
- Released: April 27, 2012
- Recorded: September 2011
- Studios: Avatar (New York, New York)
- Genre: Jazz
- Length: 61:11
- Labels: ECM; ECM 2254
- Producer: Manfred Eicher

John Abercrombie chronology
Wait Till You See Her (2009)	Within a Song (2012)	39 Steps (2013)

Within a Song is a studio album by the John Abercrombie Quartet, recorded in September 2011 and released on ECM Records in April 2012. The quartet features Abercrombie on guitar, Joe Lovano on saxophone, Drew Gress on bass and Joey Baron on drums.

== Reception ==
Professional ratings
Review scores
Source	Rating
The Australian	4/5 stars
The Guardian	4/5 stars
Tom Hull	B+

In a four star review for The Guardian, John Fordham states that "this all-star group constantly demonstrate how joyous that can sound without winding up the volume."

JazzTimes observed "in typical crystalline ECM fashion, Within a Song plays tricks with its role models, pushing envelopes that were elastic to begin with."

John McBeath of The Australian wrote, "This is a valuable collection by two old masters in a nostalgic, relaxed setting of expert craftsmanship."

Stereophile correspondent Fred Kaplan noted, "Within a Song is something of a high-wire act: delicate music of an uninsistent intensity, a quiet swing, that hangs together or collapses on the ensemble's sustenance of balance."

== Track listing ==
No.	Title	Writer(s)	Length
1.	"Where Are You?"	Harold Adamson; Jimmy McHugh	5:54
2.	"Easy Reader"	Abercrombie	6:37
3.	"Within a Song/Without a Song"	Abercrombie/Billy Rose; Edward Eliscu; Vincent Youmans	7:55
4.	"Flamenco Sketches"	Miles Davis	6:34
5.	"Nick of Time"	Abercrombie	5:57
6.	"Blues Connotation"	Ornette Coleman	6:11
7.	"Wise One"	John Coltrane	9:12
8.	"Interplay"	Bill Evans	6:26
9.	"Sometime Ago"	Sergio Mihanovich	6:25

== Personnel ==
- John Abercrombie – guitar
- Joe Lovano – tenor saxophone
- Drew Gress – double bass
- Joey Baron – drums
