= Hands On (album) =

Studio album by Paul Bley
- Released: 1993
- Recorded: March 2, 1993; Sound on Sound Studio, NYC
- Genre: Jazz
- Length: 53:42
- Label: Transheart TDCN-5084
- Producer: Kenny Inaoka

Paul Bley chronology
Zen Palace (1993)	Hands On (1993)	If We May (1993)

Hands On is a solo piano album by Paul Bley recorded in 1993 and released on the Japanese Transheart label.

== Reception ==
Professional ratings
Review scores
Source	Rating
Allmusic	4/5 stars
The Penguin Guide to Jazz Recordings	3/4 stars

Allmusic awarded the album 4 stars stating "Hands On reveals Paul Bley as an archetype -- an improvising jazz pianist who serves the larger model of an artist who meditates upon his work actively, restlessly, and relentlessly, seeking its core, until that work exhausts itself and gives way to become, finally, a work of art, original and unrepeatable".

== Track listing ==
All compositions by Paul Bley

1. "Remembering" - 8:46
2. "Points" - 5:33
3. "Ram Dance" - 8:50
4. "Three Fifth" - 12:35
5. "Hands On" - 6:48
6. "If" - 4:48
7. "Cowhand" - 4:58

== Personnel ==
- Paul Bley - Imperial Bösendorfer piano
