= Untitled (Jack DeJohnette album) =

Studio album by Jack DeJohnette's Directions
- Released: 1976
- Recorded: February 1976
- Studios: Talent, Oslo, Norway
- Genres: Jazz; post-bop; avant-garde jazz; fusion
- Length: 45:40
- Label: ECM 1074 ST
- Producer: Manfred Eicher

Jack DeJohnette chronology
Gateway (1976)	Untitled (1976)	Pictures (1977)

Jack DeJohnette's Directions chronology
Untitled (1976)	New Rags (1977)

Professional ratings
Review scores
Source	Rating
AllMusic	3/5 stars
The Rolling Stone Jazz Record Guide	3/5 stars

Untitled is an album by Jack DeJohnette's Directions, recorded in February 1976 and released on ECM Records later that year. The quintet features saxophonist Alex Foster and rhythm section John Abercrombie, Warren Bernhardt, Mike Richmond and Jack DeJohnette.

== Track listing ==
All tracks are written by Jack DeJohnette except as noted.

Side I
No.	Title	Writer(s)	Length
1.	"Flying Spirits"		13:50
2.	"Pansori Visions"	DeJohnette; Abercrombie	2:20
3.	"Fantastic"	DeJohnette; Abercrombie; Foster; Richmond	5:52
Total length:			22:02

Side II
No.	Title	Writer(s)	Length
1.	"The Vikings Are Coming"		6:43
2.	"Struttin"	DeJohnette; Foster; Abercrombie	6:30
3.	"Morning Star"	Bernhardt	7:22
4.	"Malibu Reggae"		3:03
Total length:			23:38 45:40

=== Note ===
- Untitled was originally released on LP, 8-track, and cassette. In 2019, it was released as a digital download.

== Personnel ==
Jack DeJohnette's Directions

- Alex Foster – tenor saxophone, soprano saxophone
- John Abercrombie – electric guitar, acoustic guitar
- Warren Bernhardt – piano, electric piano, clavinet, cowbell
- Mike Richmond – double bass, electric bass
- Jack DeJohnette – drums, tenor saxophone

Technical personnel

- Manfred Eicher – producer
- Jan Erik Kongshaug – engineer
- Frieder Grindler – cover design
- Roberto Masotti – photography
