= Pictures (Jack DeJohnette album) =

Studio album by Jack DeJohnette
- Released: 1977
- Recorded: February 1976
- Studio: Talent Studio; Oslo, Norway
- Genre: Jazz
- Length: 37:13
- Label: ECM 1079 ST
- Producer: Manfred Eicher

Jack DeJohnette chronology
Untitled (1976)	Pictures (1977)	New Rags (1977)

Pictures is an album by American jazz drummer and composer Jack DeJohnette, recorded in February 1976 and released on ECM the following year, featuring DeJohnette playing drums, piano and organ, with guest appearances by guitarist John Abercrombie on "Pictures 3–5".

== Reception ==
Professional ratings
Review scores
Source	Rating
AllMusic	2.5/5 stars
Tom Hull	B−
The Penguin Guide to Jazz Recordings	3/4 stars
The Rolling Stone Jazz Record Guide	3/5 stars

The AllMusic review awarded the album 2½ stars.

== Track listing ==
All tracks are written by Jack DeJohnette except as indicated.

Side I
No.	Title	Writer(s)	Length
1.	"Picture 1"		4:48
2.	"Picture 2"		7:56
3.	"Picture 3"	Abercrombie; DeJohnette	5:12
Total length:			17:56

Side II
No.	Title	Length
1.	"Picture 4"	5:21
2.	"Picture 5"	6:05
3.	"Picture 6"	7:51
Total length:		19:17 37:13

== Personnel ==
- Jack DeJohnette – drums, piano, organ
- John Abercrombie – electric guitar, acoustic guitar (tracks 3, 4 & 5)

=== Technical personnel ===
- Manfred Eicher – producer
- Jan Erik Kongshaug – engineer
- Dieter Bonhorst – layout
- Roberto Masotti – photography
