= Homecoming (Gateway album) =

1995 studio album by jazz trio Gateway

Studio album by Gateway
- Released: 1995
- Recorded: December 1994
- Genre: Jazz
- Length: 73:13
- Label: ECM; ECM 1562
- Producer: Manfred Eicher

Gateway chronology
Gateway 2 (1978)	Homecoming (1995)	In the Moment (1996)

Dave Holland chronology
Ones All (1995)	Homecoming (1995)	Dream of the Elders (1996)

Jack DeJohnette chronology
Extra Special Edition (1995)	Homecoming (1995)	In the Moment (1996)

Homecoming is the third album by jazz trio Gateway, consisting of guitarist John Abercrombie, bassist Dave Holland and drummer Jack DeJohnette, recorded in December 1994 and released on ECM—the trio's first release since Gateway 2 (1978).

== Reception ==
Professional ratings
Review scores
Source	Rating
AllMusic	3/5 stars
AllMusic	4.5/5 stars
The Penguin Guide to Jazz Recordings	3.5/4 stars

An AllMusic review by Greg Turner stated "The Gateway Trio is a cooperative in the greatest sense of the word... Even though this only the third Gateway recording and the group's first in 17 years, each group member collaborates frequently with the others. As a result there is always a great sense of interplay between Abercrombie's sometimes-mellow-sometimes-distorted guitar, Holland's huge toned bass, and DeJohnette's dancing drums... This is a fine return to recording for a great group". A separate AllMusic review by jazz critic Scott Yanow stated: "the high improvisational level makes this a set deserving of close listens."

Regarding the album's title track, Tyran Grillo wrote: "The joy in every lick and tumble is in full evidence. DeJohnette is aflame, Abercrombie following his trail of embers with laser precision and shaving off an twist of lime for his solo, while Holland... is at his buoyant best." Concerning the album as a whole, he commented: "If only we could get a taste of this alchemy in our drink, we might all live beyond our time. Invigorating and fine, Homecoming is a joy to explore time and again."

== Track listing ==
1. "Homecoming" (Holland) - 12:37
2. "Waltz New" (Abercrombie) - 8:32
3. "Modern Times" (Holland) - 7:31
4. "Calypso Falto" (Abercrombie) - 7:46
5. "Short Cut" (Abercrombie) - 6:12
6. "How's Never" (Holland) - 7:34
7. "In Your Arms" (Holland) - 5:48
8. "7th D" (DeJohnette) - 9:30
9. "Oneness" (DeJohnette) - 7:43

== Personnel ==
=== Gateway ===
- John Abercrombie – guitar
- Dave Holland – bass
- Jack DeJohnette – drums, piano
