= Dancing with Nature Spirits =

Studio album by Jack DeJohnette
- Released: 1996
- Recorded: May 1995
- Studio: Dreamland, West Hurley, NY
- Genre: Jazz
- Length: 72:06
- Label: ECM; ECM 1558
- Producer: Manfred Eicher

Jack DeJohnette chronology
In the Moment (1995)	Dancing with Nature Spirits (1996)	Oneness (1997)

Dancing with Nature Spirits is an album by American jazz drummer Jack DeJohnette, recorded in May 1995 and released on ECM Records the following year. The trio features pianist Michael Cain and reed player Steve Gorn.

== Reception ==
Professional ratings
Review scores
Source	Rating
AllMusic	4/5 stars
The Penguin Guide to Jazz Recordings	3.5/4 stars

The AllMusic review by Scott Yanow states, "The five group originals (two of which are over 20 minutes long) build gradually to a high level of intensity. Although there is no bass, the music swings in its own way and DeJohnnette's drums and percussion are consistently stimulating. This thoughtful but often-fiery music is worth a close listen."

== Track listing ==
1. "Dancing with Nature Spirits" (Jack DeJohnette, Michael Cain, Steve Gorn) – 20:28
2. "Anatolia" (Gorn) – 12:15
3. "Healing Song for Mother Earth" (DeJohnette, Cain, Gorn) – 22:01
4. "Emanations" (Cain) – 7:40
5. "Time Warps" (DeJohnette, Cain) – 9:33

== Personnel ==
- Jack DeJohnette – drums, percussion
- Michael Cain – piano, keyboards
- Steve Gorn – bansuri, soprano saxophone, clarinet
