= Up and Coming (album) =

Studio album by John Abercrombie
- Released: January 13, 2017
- Recorded: April–May 2016
- Studio: Avatar (New York, New York)
- Genre: Jazz
- Length: 47:11
- Label: ECM; ECM 2528
- Producer: Manfred Eicher

John Abercrombie chronology
39 Steps (2013)	Up and Coming (2017)

Up and Coming is a studio album by the John Abercrombie Quartet, recorded in April and May 2016 and released on ECM Records in January 2017—the final studio album by Abercrombie, who died in 2017. The quartet features rhythm section Marc Copland, Drew Gress, and Joey Baron.

== Reception ==
Professional ratings
Aggregate scores
Source	Rating
Metacritic	80/100
Review scores
Source	Rating
All About Jazz	4/5 stars
AllMusic	4/5 stars
Blurt	4/5 stars
DownBeat	4/5 stars
The Guardian	4/5 stars
The Irish Times	4/5 stars
Jazz Forum	4.5/5 stars
PopMatters	7/10 stars
RTÉ.ie	4/5 stars
The Times	3/5 stars

At Metacritic, which assigns a normalized rating out of 100 to reviews from mainstream critics, the album received an average score of 80, based on four reviews, which indicates "generally favorable reviews".

Paul de Barros of DownBeat stated, "A solid follow-up to 2013's 39 Steps, the new album by the John Abercrombie Quartet— Marc Copland (piano), Drew Gress (bass) and Joey Baron (drums)—is another quiet, delicately balanced outing with an ebbing and flowing undercurrent that recalls the understated loveliness of Bill Evans and Jim Hall. As Abercrombie fans know, the guitarist has dialed back his trademark reverb in favor of a classic, single-note glow. However, listening to his quartet still feels pleasantly like taking a warm sonic bath."

John Fordham of The Guardian said, "The whole album is the quintessence of jazz power in reserve."

== Track listing ==
All tracks are written by John Abercrombie except where noted.

No.	Title	Writer(s)	Length
1.	"Joy"		4:12
2.	"Flipside"		2:53
3.	"Sunday School"		7:18
4.	"Up and Coming"		5:50
5.	"Tears"	Marc Copland	7:34
6.	"Silver Circle"	Copland	7:06
7.	"Nardis"	Miles Davis	6:21
8.	"Jumbles"		5:57
Total length:			47:11

== Personnel ==
John Abercrombie Quartet

- John Abercrombie – guitar
- Marc Copland – piano
- Drew Gress – double bass
- Joey Baron – drums

Production

- Manfred Eicher – producer
- Thom Beemer – assistant
- Nate Odden – assistant
- James Farber – engineer
