= Gateway 2 =

Studio album by Gateway
- Released: 1978
- Recorded: July 1977
- Studio: Talent Studio; Oslo, Norway
- Genre: Jazz
- Length: 43:54
- Label: ECM 1105
- Producer: Manfred Eicher

Gateway chronology
Gateway (1976)	Gateway 2 (1978)	Homecoming (1995)

Jack DeJohnette chronology
New Rags (1977)	Gateway 2 (1978)	New Directions (1978)

Gateway 2 is the second album by Gateway, recorded in July 1977 and released on ECM the following year. The trio comprises guitarist John Abercrombie, bassist Dave Holland and drummer Jack DeJohnette.

== Reception ==
Professional ratings
Review scores
Source	Rating
AllMusic	3.5/5 stars
The Penguin Guide to Jazz	2.5/4 stars

The Penguin Guide to Jazz called the album "less effective" than the group's previous album, with "Abercrombie riffling rather desperately through his electrical shade cards. DeJohnette, as always is flawless."

The AllMusic review by Scott Yanow stated that "the playing on the five group originals is generally more fiery than introspective. None of the individual selections are all that memorable but the group improvising does have plenty of surprising moments."

== Track listing ==
1. "Opening" (John Abercrombie/Dave Holland/Jack DeJohnette) – 16:17
2. "Reminiscence" (Holland) – 4:32
3. "Sing Song" (Abercrombie) – 6:55
4. "Nexus" (Holland) – 7:55
5. "Blue" (DeJohnette) – 8:14

== Personnel ==
- John Abercrombie – electric guitar, acoustic guitar, electric mandolin
- Jack DeJohnette – drums, piano
- Dave Holland – bass
