= Emerald City (John Abercrombie and Richie Beirach album) =

Studio album by John Abercrombie and Richie Beirach
- Released: May 1987
- Recorded: February 23–25, 1987
- Studio: Mediasound, New York City
- Genre: Jazz
- Length: 47:21
- Label: Pathfinder
- Producer: Dave Baker, John Abercrombie, Richie Beirach, Douglas Lichterman

John Abercrombie chronology
Current Events (1986)	Emerald City (1987)	Getting There (1988)

Emerald City is a duet studio album by guitarist John Abercrombie and pianist Richie Beirach. The album was released on via Pathfinder Records in 1987 to modest critical success. The album was re-released on CD in 1994 by Evidence label.

== Reception ==
Professional ratings
Review scores
Source	Rating
AllMusic	2.5/5 stars
The Penguin Guide to Jazz Recordings	2.5/4 stars
The Rolling Stone Jazz & Blues Album Guide	3/5 stars
The Virgin Encyclopedia of Jazz	3/5 stars

Ron Wynn of AllMusic wrote, "Depending on how you choose to define "jazz," this duet session linking pianist Richie Beirach with John Abercrombie (playing guitar synthesizer) may or may not fit your criteria. There are certainly passages with a rock sensibility, and Abercrombie's use of a guitar synthesizer may distress those who instinctively distrust electronics in any improvising context. But if you rank jazz pedigree on skills, individuality, and the willingness to take chances, then this date qualifies on all counts".

== Track listing ==
No.	Title	Writer(s)	Length
1.	"Odin"	Beirach	9:25
2.	"Anse Des Flamands"	Beirach	8:20
3.	"Sleight of Hand"	Abercrombie, Beirach	4:45
4.	"Emerald City"	Beirach	6:05
5.	"On Overgrown Paths"	Beirach	15:00
6.	"Carnival Suspone"	Abercrombie, Beirach	5:40
Total length:			47:21

== Personnel ==
- John Abercrombie – guitar, synthesizer, producer
- Richie Beirach – piano, producer
