= Now This =

Studio album by Gary Peacock Trio
- Released: May 26, 2015
- Recorded: July 2014
- Studios: Rainbow Studio, Oslo
- Genre: Avant-garde jazz
- Length: 57:48
- Labels: ECM; 2428
- Producer: Manfred Eicher

Gary Peacock chronology
A Closer View (1998)	Now This (2015)	Tangents (2017)

Now This is an album by American jazz bassist Gary Peacock recorded in 2014 and released on the ECM label. It features a trio with pianist Marc Copland and drummer Joey Baron.

== Reception ==
Professional ratings
Review scores
Source	Rating
AllMusic	4/5 stars
The Guardian	3/5 stars
All About Jazz	3.5/5 stars
The Sydney Morning Herald	4.5/5 stars

AllMusic awarded the album 4 stars and the review by Thom Jurek stated "Now This is not only an excellent portrait of the bassist in winter -- his abilities undiminished -- but also an exercise in the possibilities of the piano trio in the 21st century". The Guardian's John Fordham said "They don’t play like a regular jazz-piano trio, often preferring tentative exchanges of clipped motifs and enigmatic queries to busy collective stretches or straight swing, and with considerable space for meditative individual statements. ...For those who know and love the participants, And Now This is captivating. Newcomers might need to give it a little quality time first". On All About Jazz Karl Ackermann said, "There is not a wasted note to be found on Now This where the compositions—some re-worked, others, new—strongly suggest a portentous air. Peacock, Copland and Baron expertly develop the pieces in that light so that, despite the overriding thoughtfulness, it is never certain in which direction the journey is moving. Now This is an thought-provoking collection rendered by brilliant performers".

In JazzTimes, Thomas Conrad wrote "Now This contains seven Peacock tunes, old ones like “Moor” and “Requiem” and pretty new ones like “Christa.” All are like passing revelations from a Peacock solo: spare, self-contained figures of mysterious expectancy. In his haunting high basslines, melodies linger, dissolve and reappear. As for Copland, he is the right pianist for an album about atmosphere and mood. But his quietude is deceptive. His scattered fragments and his counterintuitive chords create continuous subtle diversions. Baron is also subtle and provocative, and essential as a colorist". The Sydney Morning Herald's John Shand noted "Peacock's playing has lost none of its vigour or sinuousness, and his bass has been magnificently recorded. Copland's distinctive approach mingles effervescence and enigma, and Baron plays with something of the same joyous naivety with which Henri Rousseau painted".

== Track listing ==
All compositions by Gary Peacock except where noted.

1. "Gaia" - 6:41
2. "Shadows" - 5:02
3. "This" - 5:44
4. "And Now" - 4:34
5. "Esprit de Muse" (Joey Baron) - 6:16
6. "Moor" - 5:17
7. "Noh Blues" (Marc Copland) - 5:48
8. "Christa" - 4:44
9. "Vignette" - 4:56
10. "Gloria's Step" (Scott LaFaro) - 3:59
11. "Requiem" - 4:47
- Recorded at Rainbow Studio in Oslo, Norway in July 2014

== Personnel ==
- Gary Peacock — double bass
- Marc Copland — piano
- Joey Baron — drums
