= Animato (album) =

Studio album by John Abercrombie
- Released: 1990
- Recorded: October 1989
- Studio: Rainbow; Oslo, Norway
- Genre: Jazz
- Length: 43:48
- Label: ECM; ECM 1411
- Producer: Manfred Eicher

John Abercrombie chronology
John Abercrombie / Marc Johnson / Peter Erskine (1989)	Animato (1990)	Witchcraft (1991)

Animato is an album by American jazz guitarist John Abercrombie, recorded in October 1989 and released on ECM Records in 1990. The trio features keyboardist Vince Mendoza—who wrote most of the album—and drummer Jon Christensen.

== Reception ==
Professional ratings
Review scores
Source	Rating
AllMusic	3.5/5 stars
The Penguin Guide to Jazz	4/4 stars
Tom Hull	B+

The AllMusic review by Michael G. Nastos stated, "An unusual but beautiful item in John Abercrombie's discography, and a coming out for Mendoza, Animato signals a different direction for the ECM label, enabling electronic sounds in a way they had never fully embraced prior."

The Penguin Guide to Jazz called it "one of Abercrombie's most cohesive and swinging sets. He sounds completely in control of the music."

== Track listing ==
All tracks are written by Vince Mendoza except as noted.

No.	Title	Writer(s)	Length
1.	"Right Now"	Abercrombie; Christensen	7:32
2.	"Single Moon"		4:20
3.	"Agitato"		5:06
4.	"First Light"		1:35
5.	"Last Light"		4:06
6.	"For Hope of Hope"		8:52
7.	"Bright Reign"	Abercrombie	5:11
8.	"Ollie Mention"		7:34

== Personnel ==
- John Abercrombie – guitar, guitar synthesizer
- Vince Mendoza – synthesizer
- Jon Christensen – drums
