= Stark Reality =

The Stark Reality
- Origin: Boston, Massachusetts, United States
- Genres: Jazz fusion
- Years active: 1969 – 1970

The Stark Reality was an American jazz-rock band which recorded the two-disc 1970 album The Stark Reality Discovers Hoagy Carmichael's Music Shop, a heavily improvised reinvention of a 1958 children's album by songwriter Hoagy Carmichael to be used for the show Hoagy Carmichael's Music Shop which aired on PBS.

== Background ==
In 1970, Hoagy Carmichael's son, Hoagy Bix, worked at the public television station WGBH in Boston. He wanted to produce a television show with children's songs written by his father. He hired vibraphonist Monty Stark to compose theme music because he had experience in arranging and he wanted Stark to update the music for the new X generation. Stark wrote arrangements with bassist Phil Morrison, and they hired saxophonist Carl Atkins, guitarist John Abercrombie, and drummer Vinnie Johnson. The music was an odd combination of psychedelic rock and bebop jazz. They played as a quartet (without Atkins) in Cambridge, but the audiences were either tiny or nonexistent. A tour in California failed to meet their expectations, so the band broke up. The 1970 album was released by AJP Records, a label owned by jazz pianist Ahmad Jamal. (Carl Atkins did not appear on the album.) It was reissued in 2003 by Now-Again, a subsidiary of Stones Throw Records.

The band's 1970 album, Stark Reality Discovers Hoagy Carmichael's Music Shop is treasured by hip hop producers such as Pete Rock.

== Members ==
- Monty Stark – vibraphone
- Carl Atkins – saxophone
- John Abercrombie – guitar
- Phil Morrison – bass
- Vinnie Johnson – drums

== Discography ==
- Roller Coaster Ride (AJP, 1969; reissued Now-Again, 2015)
- Discovers Hoagy Carmicheal's Music Shop (AJP, 1970; reissued Now-Again, 2003/2015)
- Now (2003)
