= Wait Till You See Her (album) =

Studio album by John Abercrombie
- Released: September 25, 2009
- Recorded: December 2008
- Studio: Avatar (New York, New York)
- Genre: Jazz
- Length: 57:07
- Label: ECM; ECM 2102
- Producer: Manfred Eicher

John Abercrombie chronology
The Third Quartet (2007)	Wait Till You See Her (2009)	Within a Song (2012)

Wait Till You See Her is an album by the John Abercrombie Quartet, featuring violinist Mark Feldman, bassist Thomas Morgan, and drummer Joey Baron, recorded in December 2008 and released on ECM in September the following year.

== Reception ==
The AllMusic review by Michael G. Nastos awarded the album 3½ stars, stating, "John Abercrombie's longstanding partnership with Mark Feldman has yielded several albums of exquisite music, and Wait Till You See Her is no different. The mood is naturally restrained, contemplative, and introspective as you would expect, while there's a common thread of healthy respect that keeps the quartet in the softer mezzo piano range... At the bottom line, it's another consistent and at times excellent effort from these tried and true modern musicians."

Professional ratings
Review scores
Source	Rating
Allmusic	3.5/5 stars
Tom Hull	B+

== Track listing ==
All tracks are written by John Abercrombie except where noted.

No.	Title	Writer(s)	Length
1.	"Sad Song"		7:15
2.	"Line Up"		7:18
3.	"Wait Till You See Her"	Richard Rodgers; Lorenz Hart	5:44
4.	"Trio"		5:14
5.	"I've Overlooked Before"		7:31
6.	"Anniversary Waltz"		9:29
7.	"Out of Towner"		6:14
8.	"Chic of Araby"		8:22

== Personnel ==
- John Abercrombie – guitar
- Mark Feldman – violin
- Thomas Morgan – double bass
- Joey Baron – drums
