= Karl Ratzer =

Austrian composer

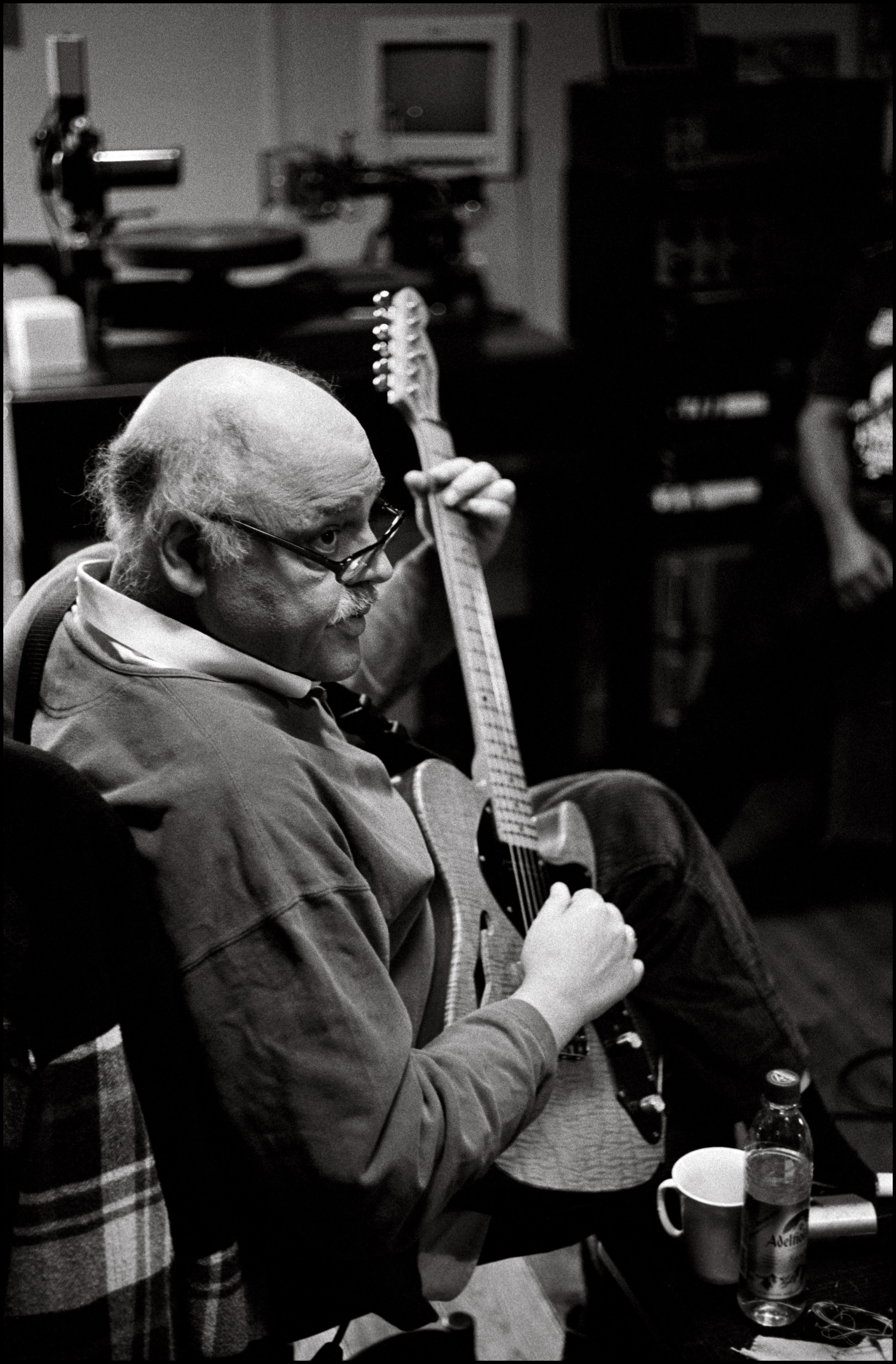
Karl Ratzer, 2010

Karl Alfred Ratzer (born July 4, 1950, Vienna) is an Austrian jazz guitarist.

Ratzer played in rock bands as a teenager and moved to the United States in 1972, where he initially played with High Voltage. He began working in Atlanta in 1973 and played with Dan Wall from 1974 to 1977; following this, he moved to New York City and worked with Bob Berg, Steve Grossman, Bob Mintzer, and Jeremy Steig. He moved back to Vienna in the early 1980s, and worked throughout Europe with Chet Baker, Eddie "Lockjaw" Davis, Johnny Griffin, Lee Konitz, James Moody, and Clark Terry. He was guest professor at the University of Music and Performing Arts Graz from 1999 to 2003, and became docent at the Vienna Music Institute in 2004.

Ratzer's cousin is jazz musician Harri Stojka.

== Discography ==
=== As leader ===
- Gipsy Love with Gipsy Love (BASF, 1971)
- In Search of the Ghost (Vanguard, 1978)
- Street Talk (Vanguard, 1979)
- Finger Prints (CMP, 1979)
- Dancing On a String (CMP, 1980)
- A Fool for Your Sake (GiG, 1981)
- Electric Finger (RST, 1982)
- Gitarre (Atom, 1982)
- Gitarrenfeuer (Bellaphon, 1985)
- Serenade (RST, 1986)
- Gumbo Dive (RST, 1991)
- Waltz for Ann (L+R, 1993)
- Bayou (Bellaphon, 1993)
- Coasting (Bellaphon, 1995)
- Saturn Returning (Enja, 1997)
- Moon Dancer (Enja, 1998)
- Real to Reel (Dominant, 2000) with Carl Verheyen
- All the Way (Enja, 2004)
- You've Changed (Organic Music, 2011)
- Underground System (Organic Music, 2014)
- My Time (Organic Music, 2016)
- Midnight Whistler (Organic Music, 2017)
- Tears (Organic Music, 2018)

=== As sideman ===
- Eddie "Lockjaw" Davis, Land of Dreams (Tilly Disc, 1982)
- Carlos Franzetti, Grafitti (Sonorama, 2007)
- Ray Mantilla, Mantilla (Inner City, 1978)
- Players Association, Turn the Music Up! (Vanguard, 1979)
- Jeremy Steig & Eddie Gomez, Rain Forest (CMP, 1980)
- Supermax, One and All (Koch, 1993)
- Dan Wall, Off the Wall (Enja, 1997)
- Rudi Wilfer, Live (RST, 1982)
