= Class Trip (album) =

Studio album by John Abercrombie
- Released: April 26, 2004
- Recorded: February 2003
- Studio: Avatar (New York, New York)
- Genre: Jazz
- Length: 71:56
- Label: ECM; ECM 1846
- Producer: Manfred Eicher

John Abercrombie chronology
Cat 'n' Mouse (2002)	Class Trip (2004)	Structures (2006)

Class Trip is an album by jazz guitarist John Abercrombie, recorded in February 2003 and released by ECM Records on April 26, 2004. The quartet features violinist Mark Feldman and rhythm section Marc Johnson and Joey Baron.

== Reception ==
Professional ratings
Review scores
Source	Rating
All About Jazz	4.5/5 stars
AllMusic	4.5/5 stars
The Guardian	4/5 stars
The Penguin Guide to Jazz	4/4 stars
Tom Hull	B+

John Kelman of All About Jazz commented, "His latest quartet release, Class Trip, delivers on that promise with an album that raises the bar even further, and never fails to make the leap."

The Penguin Guide to Jazz awarded the album 4 stars, stating, "Class Trip is quiet, thoughtful and about as remote from the current axis of American jazz guitar."

The AllMusic review by Thom Jurek states:

On Class Trip, the bandmembers come together fully and build on that concept with such beauty and grace that they sound as if they've been playing together all their lives. The sheer subtle intuition that guides these proceedings is breathtaking... Abercrombie's compositions for this band are the most adventurous and graceful of his long career; as a unit, the quartet is a band without peers that plays a music whose challenge is only eclipsed by its accessibility and singular language.

== Track listing ==
All tracks are written by John Abercrombie, except as noted.

No.	Title	Writer(s)	Length
1.	"Dansir"		9:31
2.	"Risky Business"		7:38
3.	"Descending Grace"		8:56
4.	"Illinoise"	Abercrombie; Baron; Feldman; Johnson	5:35
5.	"Cat Walk"		7:55
6.	"Excuse My Shoes"		8:28
7.	"Swirls"		6:06
8.	"Jack and Betty"		3:39
9.	"Class Trip"		7:29
10.	"Soldier's Song"	Béla Bartók	3:02
11.	"Epilogue"	Abercrombie; Baron; Feldman; Johnson	3:37

== Personnel ==
- John Abercrombie – guitar
- Mark Feldman – violin
- Marc Johnson – bass
- Joey Baron – drums
