= While We're Young (album) =

Studio album by John Abercrombie
- Released: 1993
- Recorded: June 1992
- Genre: Jazz
- Length: 58:37
- Label: ECM; ECM 1489
- Producer: Manfred Eicher

John Abercrombie chronology
Witchcraft (1991)	While We're Young (1993)	November (1993)

While We're Young is an album by the jazz guitarist John Abercrombie, recorded in June 1992 and released by ECM Records in 1993. The trio features organist Dan Wall and drummer Adam Nussbaum.

== Reception ==
Professional ratings
Review scores
Source	Rating
AllMusic	4/5 stars
MusicHound Jazz	4/5 stars
The Penguin Guide to Jazz	3.5/4 stars
The Rolling Stone Jazz & Blues Album Guide	3/5 stars
The Virgin Encyclopedia of Eighties Music	3/5 stars

The editors of AllMusic awarded the album 4 stars, and reviewer Michael G. Nastos stated: "This trio hits on many different angles, from somber and reverent to acutely kinetic and truly electrifying. This is exploratory music, unique unto itself, and a landmark fusion of the '90s. If this kind of jazz is what you crave, those who were young in the '70s, it's a must-buy, no doubt."

The authors of The Penguin Guide to Jazz awarded the album 3½ stars, saying, "It was widely assumed in 1992 that Abercrombie's organ trio—poised somewhere between Wes Montgomery and Lifetime—was a one-off idea, a forgivable self-indulgence that actually worked better than one had a right to expect. In fact its great success has largely defined Abercrombie's recent career and has very significantly kick-started his playing."

The Washington Post's Geoffrey Himes noted that the music is "expertly played and provides the harmonic substance that such atmospheric music usually lacks," but commented: "this is one of those exceptions that lends credence to the unfair stereotype that all ECM music is as static and impersonal as the calendar art on its album covers."

Tyran Grillo of ECM blog Between Sound and Space described the album as "candy for the ears," featuring a "sumptuous combination of instruments, cradled in ECM's enabling acoustics."

== Track listing ==
No.	Title	Length
1.	"Rain Forest" (Wall)	9:32
2.	"Stormz" (Abercrombie, Nussbaum)	6:05
3.	"Dear Rain" (Abercrombie)	5:58
4.	"Mirrors" (Wall)	8:10
5.	"Carol's Carol" (Wall)	8:51
6.	"Scromotion" (Abercrombie)	6:29
7.	"A Matter of Time" (Abercrombie)	8:17
8.	"Dolorosa" (Wall)	5:43

== Personnel ==
- John Abercrombie – guitar
- Dan Wall – Hammond organ
- Adam Nussbaum – drums
