= Tactics (album) =

Live album by John Abercrombie/Dan Wall/Adam Nussbaum
- Released: 1997
- Recorded: July 13–15, 1996
- Venue: Visiones; New York City
- Genre: Jazz
- Length: 76:23
- Label: ECM; ECM 1623
- Producer: Manfred Eicher

John Abercrombie chronology
Speak of the Devil (1994)	Tactics (1997)	Open Land (1999)

Tactics is a live album by jazz guitarist John Abercrombie, organist Dan Wall and drummer Adam Nussbaum, recorded in New York City over three days in July 1996 and released by ECM Records in 1997.

== Reception ==
Professional ratings
Review scores
Source	Rating
AllMusic	4/5 stars
The Penguin Guide to Jazz	3.5/4 stars

Scott Yanow of AllMusic writes: "Not sounding at all like a typical soul-jazz organ group, these musicians take more advanced improvisations."

The Penguin Guide to Jazz gave the album 3½ stars, stating that it contains "churning but still delicate Hammond shapes, a rock steady bass, and some of Abercrombie's lightest and most dancing jazz-playing".

== Track listing ==
All compositions by John Abercrombie except as indicated

1. "Sweet Sixteen" – 11:21
2. "Last Waltz" – 11:14
3. "Bo Diddy" (Wall) – 11:43
4. "You and the Night and the Music" (Howard Dietz, Arthur Schwartz) – 10:15
5. "Chumbida" (Nussbaum) – 5:46
6. "Dear Rain" – 7:38
7. "Mr. Magoo" (Wall) – 8:44
8. "Long Ago (and Far Away)" (Ira Gershwin, Jerome Kern) – 9:42

== Personnel ==
- John Abercrombie – jazz guitar
- Dan Wall – Hammond organ
- Adam Nussbaum – drums
