= Gateway (band) =

American jazz band

Gateway was an American jazz trio formed in 1975. The members were guitarist John Abercrombie, bassist Dave Holland, and drummer Jack DeJohnette. The group also joined Collin Walcott on his debut album Cloud Dance (ECM 1062) recorded in 1975. The trio reunited temporarily for a performance in 2012 to mark DeJohnette's 70th birthday.

== Discography ==
- 1976: Gateway (ECM)
- 1978: Gateway 2 (ECM)
- 1995: Homecoming (ECM)
- 1996: In the Moment (ECM)
