= Adam Nussbaum =

American jazz drummer (born 1955)

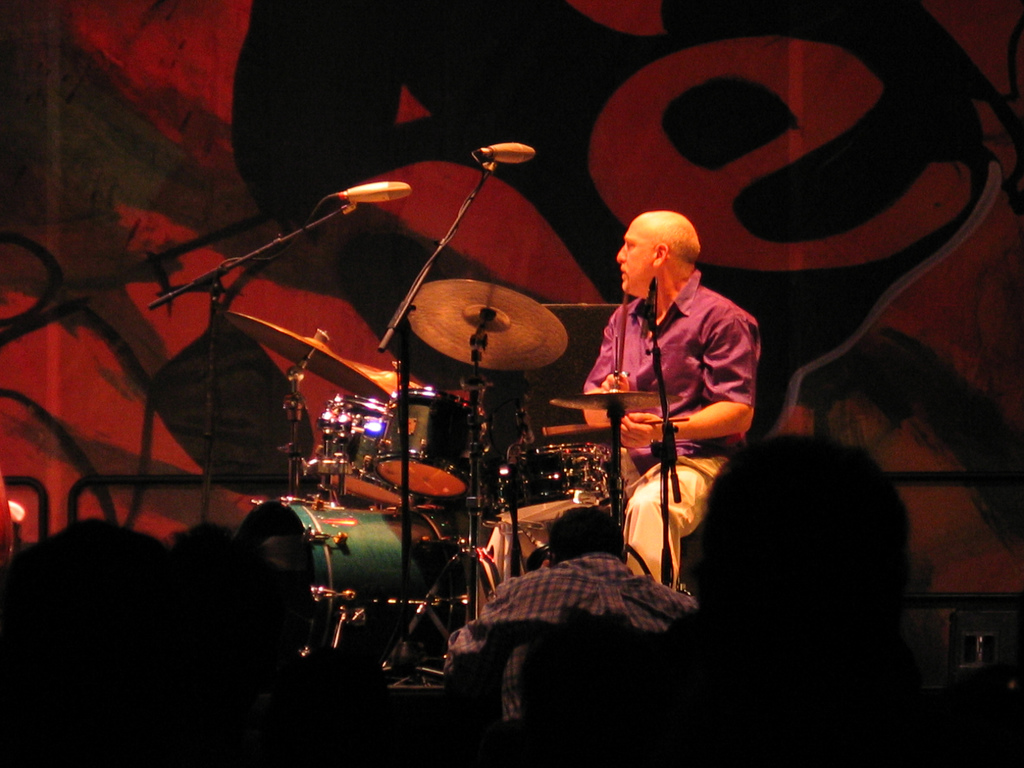
- Adam Nussbaum at a jazz festival in Puerto Rico

Background information
- Born: November 29, 1955 (age 70); New York City, New York, U.S.
- Genre: Jazz
- Occupation: Musician
- Instrument: Drums
- Years active: 1970s–present
- Website: www.adamnussbaum.com

Adam Nussbaum (born November 29, 1955) is an American jazz drummer.

== Early life ==
Nussbaum was born in New York City on November 29, 1955. He grew up in Norwalk, Connecticut, and first played the drums at the age of four. After five years of piano study, he got his first drum set when he was around twelve. He later studied music at the City College of New York, during which time he also played in local clubs.

== Later life and career ==
In 1978 he joined Dave Liebman's quintet and did his first European tour with John Scofield.

Nussbaum played with saxophonist Stan Getz in 1982–83. In 1983 he also became a member of the Gil Evans Orchestra, and toured Europe and Japan with it two years later.

He later joined the Eliane Elias/Randy Brecker Quartet, Gary Burton, and Toots Thielemans. In 1987 he began touring with Michael Brecker's band. He was a member of Brecker's Grammy award-winning album. "Don't try this at home" During 1992 Nussbaum was part of the Carla Bley Big Band and the previous year John Abercrombie hired him to complete his organ trio.

Nussbaum has kept active in a wide variety of groups and as a freelance. His recording debut as leader was in 2018, with The Lead Belly Project. This quartet album was released by Sunnyside Records.

== Discography ==
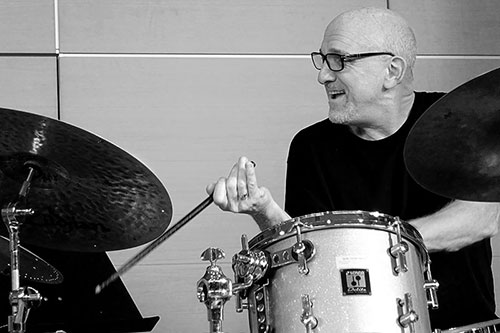
Adam Nussbaum (2015) in Aarhus, Denmark

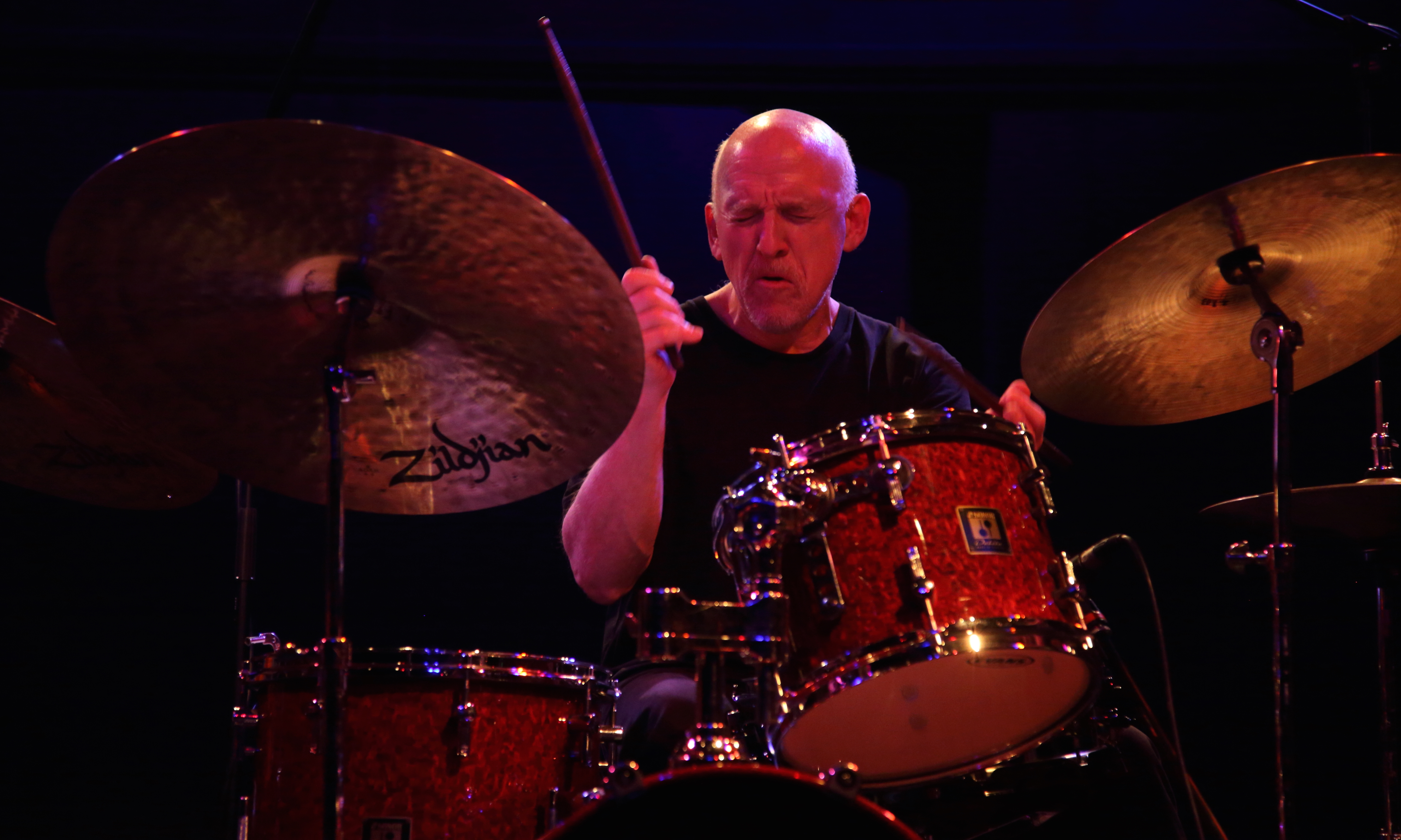

=== As leader ===
- The Lead Belly Project (Sunnyside，2018)
- Lead Belly ReImagined’’ (Sunnyside Records/ 2020)

=== As sideman ===
With John Abercrombie

- While We're Young (ECM, 1992)
- Speak of the Devil (ECM, 1993)
- Tactics (ECM, 1997)
- Open Land (ECM, 1998)

With Michael Brecker

- Don't Try This at Home (Impulse!, 1988)
- Now you See It... (Now you Don't) (GRP, 1990)

With Gil Evans

- Live at Sweet Basil (Gramavision, 1986) – rec. 1984
- Live at Sweet Basil Vol. 2 (Gramavision, 1987) – rec. 1984

With David Liebman

- Doin' It Again (Timeless, 1979)
- If They Only Knew (Timeless, 1980)

With Tisziji Munoz

- Visiting This Planet (Anami Music, 1988)
- Hearing Voices (Anami Music, 1994) – rec. 1981, 1984

With John Scofield

- Rough House (Enja, 1978)
- Who's Who? (Jive, 1979)
- Bar Talk (Jive, 1980)
- Shinola (Enja, 1981)
- Out Like a Light (Enja, 1981)

With Steve Swallow

- Deconstructed (Xtra Watt, 1997) – rec. 1996
- Always Pack Your Uniform on Top (Xtra Watt, 2000) – live rec. 1999
- Damaged in Transit (Xtra Watt, 2003) – rec. 2001
- Winter Songs (ECM, 2024)

With Sigurd Ulveseth

- To wisdom, the prize (Taurus, 1995)
- Infant eyes (Taurus, 1997)
- Wish I knew (Taurus, 2001)

With Linley Hamilton

- For The record (Teddy D, 2020)
- Ginger's Hollow (Whirlwind Recordings, 2023)

With others

- Paul Bley, If We May (SteepleChase, 1993)
- George Cables, I Mean You (SteepleChase, 1993)
- Ted Curson, I Heard Mingus (Interplay, 1980)
- Hal Galper, Ivory Forest (Enja, 1979)
- Mark Isaacs, Keeping the Standards (Vorticity, 2004)
- Lee Konitz, The New York Album (Soul Note, 1988)
- Rick Margitza, Color (Blue Note, 1989)
- Karlheinz Miklin, Last Waltz (Acoustic Music, 1997)
- Mark Murphy, Kerouac, Then and Now (Muse, 1989)
- Ed Summerlin, Eye on the Future (Ictus, 1999)
- Tom Varner, Motion/Stillness (Soul Note, 1982)
- Miroslav Vitous, Universal Syncopations II (ECM, 1995)

== Gallery ==
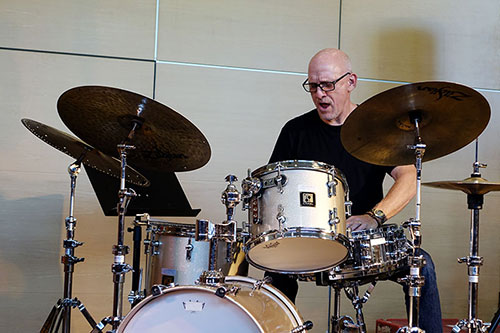

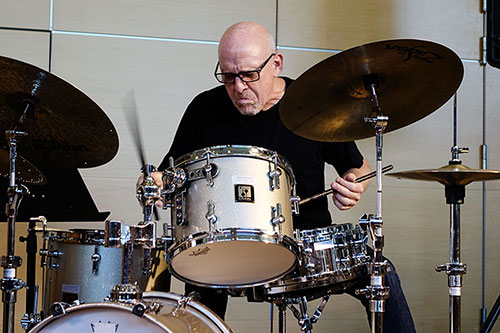

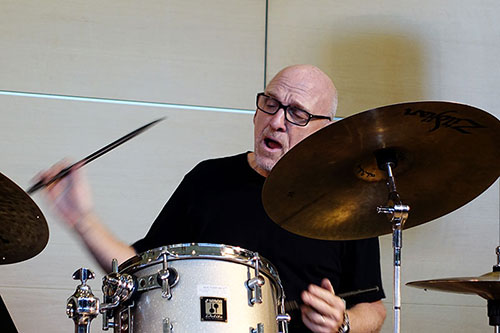

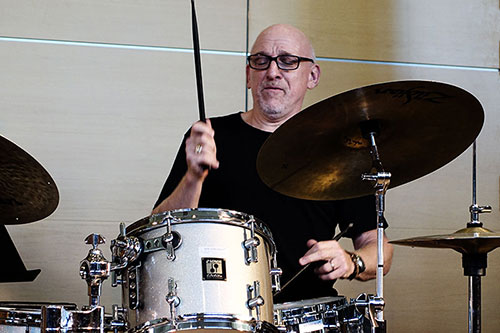

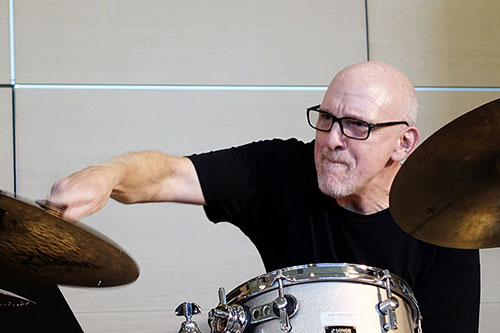

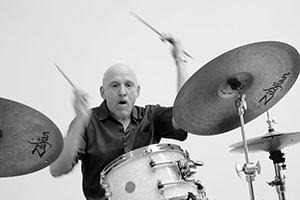
