= Getting There (album) =

Studio album by John Abercrombie
- Released: February 1988
- Recorded: April 1987
- Studio: Power Station, New York City
- Genre: Jazz
- Length: 44:07
- Label: ECM 1321
- Producer: Lee Townsend

John Abercrombie chronology
| Emerald City (1987) | Getting There (1988) | Upon a Time (1989) |

Getting There is a studio album by jazz guitarist John Abercrombie, recorded in April 1987 and released on ECM Records in February 1988. The trio features rhythm section Marc Johnson and Peter Erskine, with guest appearances from saxophonist Michael Brecker on three tracks.

== Reception ==
Professional ratings
Review scores
| Source | Rating |
|---|---|
| AllMusic | 2.5/5 stars |
| The Penguin Guide to Jazz | 3/4 stars |

Critic Jim Todd at AllMusic stated: "The music on this 1988 release from guitarist John Abercrombie is groomed to such aseptic perfection that little remains of the musical personalities behind these sounds... Musicians of the caliber of Abercrombie, Johnson, Erskine, and Brecker cannot fail to generate interest when they get together. This time out, though, their efforts would have been better presented as a master class workshop."

Tyran Grillo of ECM blog Between Sound and Space commented, "Abercrombie has a tendency to catapult his notes, sending listeners on clean, high lobs. These are some of his brightest, not least because of Lee Townsend’s sparkling production. And in the company of such comparably strong wings, this flock can do no wrong. This is captivating music-making that welcomes us into the joy of musicians at the peak of their expressive powers."

== Track listing ==
All tracks are written by John Abercrombie except where noted.

| No. | Title | Writer(s) | Length |
|---|---|---|---|
| 1. | "Sidekicks" | | 5:22 |
| 2. | "Upon a Time" | | 4:29 |
| 3. | "Getting There" | | 7:39 |
| 4. | "Remember Hymn" | | 5:18 |
| 5. | "Thalia" | Vince Mendoza | 4:20 |
| 6. | "Furs on Ice" | Marc Johnson | 8:12 |
| 7. | "Chance" | | 5:00 |
| 8. | "Labour Day" | | 3:47 |
| Total length: | | | 44:07 |

== Personnel ==
- John Abercrombie – acoustic and electric guitars, guitar synthesizer
- Marc Johnson – double bass
- Peter Erskine – drums

Guest

- Michael Brecker – tenor saxophone

Technical personnel

- Lee Townsend – producer
- James Farber – engineer
- Don Rodenbach – assistant engineer
- Dieter Rehm – cover design, cover photo
