= John Abercrombie (guitarist) =

American jazz guitarist (1944–2017)

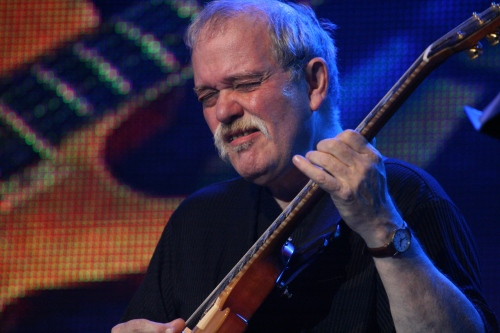
- Abercrombie at Bratislava Jazz Days, 2007

Background information
- Born: John Laird Abercrombie; December 16, 1944; Port Chester, New York, U.S.
- Died: August 22, 2017 (aged 72) Cortlandt Manor, New York
- Genres: Jazz, jazz fusion, free jazz
- Occupations: Musician, composer
- Instrument: Guitar
- Years active: 1969–2017
- Label: ECM
- Formerly of: Dreams, Gateway

John Laird Abercrombie (December 16, 1944 – August 22, 2017) was an American jazz guitarist. His work explored jazz fusion, free jazz, and avant-garde jazz. Abercrombie studied at Berklee College of Music in Boston, Massachusetts. He was known for his understated style and his work with organ trios.

== Career ==
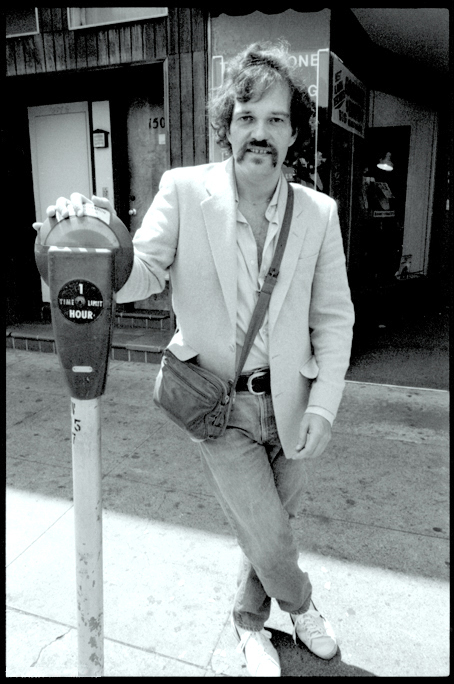
John Abercrombie, KJAZ radio, Alameda, California, August 11, 1981

=== Early life and education ===
John Abercrombie was born on December 16, 1944, in Port Chester, New York. Growing up in the 1950s in Greenwich, Connecticut he was attracted to the rock and roll of Chuck Berry, Elvis Presley, Fats Domino, and Bill Haley and the Comets. He also liked the sound of jazz guitarist Mickey Baker of the vocal duo Mickey and Silvia. He had two friends who were musicians with a large jazz collection. They played him albums by Dave Brubeck and Miles Davis. The first jazz guitar album he heard was by Barney Kessel.

He took guitar lessons at the age of ten, asking his teacher to show him what Barney Kessel was playing. After high school, he attended Berklee College of Music. At Berklee, he was drawn to the music of Jim Hall, the 1962 album The Bridge by Sonny Rollins, and Wes Montgomery on his albums The Wes Montgomery Trio (1959) and Boss Guitar (1963). He cites George Benson and Pat Martino as inspirations. He often played with other students at Paul's Mall, a jazz club in Boston connected to a larger club, Jazz Workshop. Appearing at Paul's Mall led to meetings with Michael Brecker, Randy Brecker, and organist Johnny Hammond Smith, who invited him to go on tour.

=== Stark Reality, Dreams, and Gateway ===
Abercrombie graduated from Berklee in 1967 and attended North Texas State University before moving to New York City in 1969. Before becoming a popular session musician, he joined Monty Stark's band, Stark Reality, in 1969 and recorded several sides including Stark Reality Discovers Hoagy Carmichael's Music Shop. Abercrombie went on to record with Gato Barbieri in 1971, Barry Miles in 1972, and Gil Evans in 1974. In 1969 he joined the Brecker Brothers in the jazz-rock fusion band Dreams. He continued to play fusion in Billy Cobham's band, but found that he disliked its focus on rock over jazz. Nonetheless his reputation grew with the popularity of both Cobham and Dreams. The band shared billing with such acts as the Doobie Brothers, but Abercrombie found his career taking an unwanted direction. "One night we appeared at the Spectrum in Philadelphia and I thought, 'What am I doing here?' It just didn't compute."

An invitation from drummer Jack DeJohnette led to the fulfillment of Abercrombie's desire to play in a jazz-oriented ensemble. Around the same time, record producer Manfred Eicher, founder and president of ECM Records, invited him to record an album. He recorded his first solo album, Timeless, with DeJohnette and keyboardist Jan Hammer, who had been his roommate in the 1960s. In 1975 he formed the band Gateway with DeJohnette and bassist Dave Holland, recording the albums Gateway (1976) and Gateway 2 (1978). Though Abercrombie would record for other labels going forward, ECM became his mainstay, and his association with that label continued for the rest of his career.

=== Working as a leader ===
The Gateway band played songs written by all three members, in a free jazz style. Following his albums as a member of the Gateway trio, Abercrombie moved to playing in a more traditional style, recording for ECM three albums, Arcade (1979), Abercrombie Quartet (1979), and M (1981) with a quartet that included pianist Richie Beirach, bassist George Mraz, and drummer Peter Donald. Abercrombie said, "it was extremely important to have that group ... it was my first opportunity to really be a leader and write consistently for the same group of musicians." During the mid-1970s and into the 1980s, he contributed to ensembles led by DeJohnette and participated in other sessions for ECM, occasionally doubling on electric mandolin. He toured with guitarist Ralph Towner with whom he recorded two albums, Sargasso Sea (1976) and Five Years Later (1981). During the mid-1980s, he continued to play standards with bassist George Mraz, and he played in a bop duo with guitarist John Scofield. He also appeared on a number of ECM releases in various ensembles with other artists on the label.

Between 1984 and 1990, Abercrombie experimented with a guitar synthesizer. He first used the instrument, though not exclusively, in 1984 in a trio with Marc Johnson on bass and Peter Erskine on drums, as well as with pianist Paul Bley in a free jazz group. The synthesizer allowed him to play what he called "louder, more open music." Abercrombie's trio with Johnson and Erskine released three albums during this time showcasing the guitar-synth: Current Events (1986), Getting There (1988, with Michael Brecker), and a live album, John Abercrombie / Marc Johnson / Peter Erskine (1989).

The 1990s and 2000s marked a time of many new associations. In 1992, Abercrombie, drummer Adam Nussbaum, and Hammond organist Jeff Palmer made a free-jazz album. He then started a trio with Nussbaum and organist Dan Wall and released While We're Young (1992), Speak of the Devil (1994), and Tactics (1997). He added trumpeter Kenny Wheeler, violinist Mark Feldman and saxophonist Joe Lovano to the trio to record Open Land (1999). The Gateway band reunited for the albums Homecoming (1995) and In the Moment (1996).

Abercrombie continued to tour and record to the end of his life. He also continued to release albums on the ECM label, an association which lasted for more than 40 years. As he said in an interview, "I'd like people to perceive me as having a direct connection to the history of jazz guitar, while expanding some musical boundaries."

In 2017, Abercrombie died of heart failure in Cortlandt Manor, New York, at the age of 72.

== Discography ==
=== As leader/co-leader ===
- Timeless (ECM, 1975) with Jan Hammer, Jack DeJohnette
- Sargasso Sea (ECM, 1976) with Ralph Towner
- Characters (ECM, 1978)
- Arcade (ECM, 1979) as John Abercrombie Quartet with Richie Beirach, George Mraz, Peter Donald
- Abercrombie Quartet (ECM, 1980) as John Abercrombie Quartet with Richie Beirach, George Mraz, Peter Donald
- Straight Flight (Jam, 1980) as John Abercrombie Trio with George Mraz, Peter Donald
- M (ECM, 1981) as John Abercrombie Quartet with Richie Beirach, George Mraz, Peter Donald
- Route Two (Landslide, 1981) with David Earle Johnson, Dan Wall
- Five Years Later (ECM, 1982) with Ralph Towner
- The Midweek Blues (Plug, 1983) with David Earle Johnson, Jan Hammer
- Night (ECM, 1984) with Michael Brecker, Jan Hammer, Jack DeJohnette
- Drum Strum (1750 Arch, 1984) with George Marsh
- Solar (Palo Alto, 1984) with John Scofield
- Current Events (ECM, 1986) with Marc Johnson, Peter Erskine
- All Strings Attached (Verve, 1987) with Tal Farlow, Larry Carlton, Larry Coryell, John Scofield, John Patitucci, Billy Hart
- Emerald City (Pathfinder, 1987) with Richie Beirach
- Getting There (ECM, 1988) with Marc Johnson, Peter Erskine, Michael Brecker
- My Foolish Heart (Jazz City, 1988) with Marc Cohen, Gary Peacock, Jeff Hirshfield
- John Abercrombie / Marc Johnson / Peter Erskine (ECM, 1989)
- Upon a Time (New Albion, 1989) with Mel Graves, George Marsh
- Animato (ECM, 1989) with Vince Mendoza, Jon Christensen
- Abracadabra (Soul Note, 1990) with Jeff Palmer, David Liebman, Adam Nussbaum
- Double Variations (Justin Time, 1990) with Tim Brady
- Secret Obsession (Nabel, 1991) with Uli Beckerhoff, Arild Andersen, John Marshall
- Witchcraft (Justin Time, 1991) with Don Thompson
- Yesterday's Tomorrow (European Music Productions, 1991) with Ron McClure, Aldo Romano
- The Toronto Concert (Maracatu, 1992) with Chris Minh Doky, Niels Lan Doky, Adam Nussbaum
- Ease On (AudioQuest Music, 1993) with Jeff Palmer, Arthur Blythe, Victor Lewis
- Farewell (Musidisc, 1993) with Andy LaVerne, George Mraz, Adam Nussbaum
- November (ECM, 1993) with John Surman, Marc Johnson, Peter Erskine
- While We're Young (ECM, 1993) with Dan Wall, Adam Nussbaum
- Speak of the Devil (ECM, 1994) as John Abercrombie Trio with Dan Wall, Adam Nussbaum
- Tactics (ECM, 1997) with Adam Nussbaum, Dan Wall
- Standard Transmission (GOWI Records, 1997) with Jacek Kochan, Pat LaBarbera, Jim Vivian
- Open Land (ECM, 1999) with Kenny Wheeler, Joe Lovano, Mark Feldman, Dan Wall, Adam Nussbaum
- Speak Easy (Starling, 1999) with Jarek Śmietana, Harvie Swartz, Adam Czerwiński
- The Hudson Project (Stretch, 2000) with Peter Erskine, Bob Mintzer, John Patitucci
- Burn'in The Blues (Consolidated Artists Productions, 2001) with Jeff Palmer, Vincent Herring, Bob Leto
- That's for Sure (Challenge, 2002) with Marc Copland, Kenny Wheeler
- Cat 'n' Mouse (ECM, 2002) with Mark Feldman, Marc Johnson, Joey Baron
- Noisy Old Men (Jam, 2002) with Mick Goodrick, Steve Swallow, Gary Chaffee
- Three Guitars (Chesky, 2003) with Larry Coryell, Badi Assad
- Animations (Underhill Jazz, 2003) with John Basile
- Class Trip (ECM, 2004) with Mark Feldman, Marc Johnson, Joey Baron
- Alone Together (Acoustic Music, 2004) with Frank Haunschild
- Brand New (Challenge, 2004) with Marc Copland, Kenny Wheeler
- Echoes (Alessa, 2005) with Arthur Blythe, Terri Lyne Carrington, Anthony Cox, Mark Feldman, Gust Tsilis
- Structures (Chesky, 2006) with Eddie Gomez, Gene Jackson
- The Third Quartet (ECM, 2007) with Mark Feldman, Marc Johnson, Joey Baron

In an interview with Jason Crane, Abercrombie described The Third Quartet as having more of "a chamber atmosphere" than previous projects. JazzTimes described the guitarists' band as one that provides "uncommon support," with reviewer Brent Burton writing, "There are no weak points in this band’s discography, but The Third Quartet might be the best of all three."

- Topics (Challenge, 2007) with John Ruocco
- Coincidence (Whaling City Sound, 2007) with Joe Beck
- Tales (Sony BMG, 2008) with Robert Balzar
- Wait Till You See Her (ECM, 2009) as John Abercrombie Quartet with Mark Feldman, Thomas Morgan, Joey Baron
- Cradle of Light (EFCM, 2009) with Marek Dykta
- Speak to Me (Pirouet, 2011) with Marc Copland
- Within a Song (ECM, 2012) as John Abercrombie Quartet with Joe Lovano, Drew Gress, Joey Baron
- 39 Steps (ECM, 2013) as John Abercrombie Quartet with Marc Copland, Drew Gress, Joey Baron
- The Angle Below (SteepleChase, 2013)
- Inspired (ArtistShare, 2016) with Peter Bernstein, Lage Lund, Rale Micic
- Up and Coming (ECM, 2017) as John Abercrombie Quartet with Marc Copland, Drew Gress, Joey Baron

With Andy LaVerne

- Natural Living (Musidisc, 1990)
- Nosmo King (SteepleChase, 1994)
- Now It Can Be Played (SteepleChase, 1995)
- Where We Were (Double-Time, 1996)
- Timeline (Steeplechase, 2003)
- A Nice Idea (Steeplechase, 2005)
- Live from New York (Steeplechase, 2010)

=== As a member ===
Gateway
With Dave Holland and Jack DeJohnette

- Gateway (ECM, 1976)
- Gateway 2 (ECM, 1978)
- Homecoming (ECM, 1995)
- In the Moment (ECM, 1996)

=== As sideman ===
With Gato Barbieri

- Under Fire (Flying Dutchman, 1971 [1973])
- Bolivia (Flying Dutchman, 1973)

With Billy Cobham

- Crosswinds (Atlantic, 1974)
- Total Eclipse (Atlantic, 1974)
- Shabazz (Atlantic, 1975)

With Marc Copland

- Second Look (Savoy, 1996)
- That's For Sure (2001)
- ...And (Hatology, 2003)
- Another Place (Pirouet, 2008)

With Jack DeJohnette

- Sorcery (Prestige, 1974)
- Cosmic Chicken (Prestige, 1975)
- Untitled (ECM, 1976)
- Pictures (ECM, 1977)
- New Rags (ECM, 1977) with Directions
- New Directions (ECM, 1978)
- New Directions in Europe (ECM, Live 1979, rel. 1980)

With Peter Erskine

- Transition (Denon, 1987)
- Motion Poet (Denon, 1988)

With Danny Gottlieb

- Aquamarine (Atlantic Jazz, 1987)
- Whirlwind (Atlantic, 1989)
- Brooklyn Blues (Big World, 1991) with Jeremy Steig, Gil Goldstein, Chip Jackson

With Dave Liebman

- Lookout Farm (ECM, 1973)
- Drum Ode (ECM, 1974)
- Sweet Hands (Horizon, 1975)

With Rudy Linka

- Rudy Linka Quartet (Arta, 1991)
- Mostly Standards (Arta, 1993)
- Lucky Southern (Quinton, 2006)
- Every Moment (Acoustic Music, 2011)

With Charles Lloyd

- Voice in the Night (ECM, 1999)
- The Water Is Wide (ECM, 2000)
- Hyperion with Higgins (ECM, 2001)
- Lift Every Voice (ECM, 2002)

With Barry Miles

- White Heat (Mainstream, 1971)
- Scatbird (Mainstream, 1972)

With Terry Plumeri

- He Who Lives In Many Places (Airborne, 1971) featuring Herbie Hancock, Michael Smith, John Abercrombie, Eric Gravatt
- Ongoing (Airborne, 1978)

With Enrico Rava

- Katcharpari (MPS/BASF, 1973)
- The Pilgrim and the Stars (ECM, 1975)
- Pupa o Crisalide (RCA, 1975)
- "Quotation Marks" (Japo, 1976)
- The Plot (ECM, 1977)

With Johnny "Hammond" Smith

- Nasty! (Prestige, 1968)
- Forever Taurus (Milestone, 1976)
- Storm Warning (Milestone, 1977)

With Lonnie Smith

- Afro Blue (Venus, 1993)
- Purple Haze: Tribute to Jimi Hendrix (Venus, 1995)
- Foxy Lady: Tribute to Jimi Hendrix (Venus, 1996)

With Collin Walcott

- Cloud Dance (ECM, 1975)
- Grazing Dreams (ECM, 1977)

With Kenny Wheeler

- Deer Wan (ECM, 1977)
- Music for Large & Small Ensembles (ECM, 1990)
- The Widow in the Window (ECM, 1990)
- It Takes Two! (2006)

With others

- Franco Ambrosetti, Light Breeze (Enja, 1998)
- Horacee Arnold – Tales of the Exonerated Flea (Columbia, 1974)
- Jerry Bergonzi – Tenorist (Savant, 2007)
- Paul Bley – Live at Sweet Basil (Soul Note, 1988)
- Salvatore Bonafede, Journey to Donnafugata (CamJazz, 2004)
- Bob Brookmeyer and the WDR Big Band – Electricity (1994)
- Royce Campbell – Six by Six: A Jazz Guitar Celebration (rec. 1994, rel. 2004) with Larry Coryell, Pat Martino, Bucky Pizzarelli, Dave Stryker
- Stanley Clarke & Bill Shields – Shieldstone (Optimism, 1987)
- Dreams – Dreams (Columbia, 1970)
- Urszula Dudziak – Future Talk (Inner City, 1979)
- Mark Egan - As We Speak (Wavetone, 2006)
- Gil Evans – The Gil Evans Orchestra Plays the Music of Jimi Hendrix (RCA, 1974)
- Jan Garbarek – Eventyr (ECM, 1981)
- Jim Hall – Jim Hall And Friends Live At Town Hall Vol.2 (Musicmasters, 1991) featuring John Scofield, John Abercrombie, Mick Goodrick, Gary Burton
- Tom Harrell – Sail Away (Contemporary, 1989)
- Clint Houston – Watership Down (Trio, 1978)
- Bobby Hutcherson – Un Poco Loco (Columbia, 1980)
- Jeff Johnston – Nuage (Justin Time, 2001) featuring Dave Liebman & John Abercrombie
- Lee Konitz – Sound of Surprise (RCA Victor, 1999)
- Andy LaVerne – Liquid Silver (DMP, 1984)
- Andy LaVerne – Plays the Music of Chick Corea (Jazzline 2008)
- Joe Lovano – Landmarks (Blue Note, 1991)
- Bob Mintzer – Hymn (Owl, 1990)
- Czesław Niemen – Mourner's Rhapsody (1974)
- Mike Nock – Climbing (Tomato, 1979)
- Makoto Ozone – Now You Know (Columbia, 1987)
- Jeff Palmer – Laser Wizzard (Statiras, 1987) with Adam Nussbaum, Gary Campbell
- Michel Petrucciani – Michel plays Petrucciani (Blue Note, 1988)
- Barre Phillips – Mountainscapes (ECM, 1976)
- Stark Reality – The Stark Reality Discovers Hoagy Carmichael's Music Shop (1970)
- John Surman – Brewster's Rooster (ECM, 2009)
- Harvie Swartz – Arrival (RCA 1992)
- Joseph Tawadros – The Hour of Separation (2010)
- Henri Texier – Colonel Skopje (Label Bleu, 1988)
- The Don Thompson Quartet – A Beautiful Friendship (Concord Jazz, 1984)
- McCoy Tyner – Quartets 4 X 4 (Milestone, 1980)
- Michał Urbaniak – Fusion III (Columbia, 1975)
- Jim Vivian - Sometime Ago (Cornerstone, 2018)
- Jack Walrath – Neohippus (Blue Note, 1989)
- Denny Zeitlin – Tidal Wave (Palo Alto, 1984)
