= Gateway (Gateway album) =

Studio album by Gateway
- Released: 1976
- Recorded: March 1975
- Studio: Tonstudio Bauer; Ludwigsburg, W. Germany
- Genre: Jazz fusion; free jazz; post-bop
- Length: 41:34
- Label: ECM 1061 ST
- Producer: Manfred Eicher

Gateway chronology
Gateway (1976)	Gateway 2 (1978)

John Abercrombie chronology
Timeless (1975)	Gateway (1976)	Sargasso Sea (1976)

Dave Holland chronology
Sam Rivers / Dave Holland Vol. 2 (1976)	Gateway (1976)	Emerald Tears (1977)

Jack DeJohnette chronology
Cosmic Chicken (1975)	Gateway (1976)	Untitled (1976)

Gateway is the debut album by jazz trio Gateway, recorded in March 1975 and released on ECM the following year. The trio comprises guitarist John Abercrombie, bassist Dave Holland and drummer Jack DeJohnette.

== Reception ==
Professional ratings
Review scores
Source	Rating
AllMusic	4.5/5 stars
The Penguin Guide to Jazz	3/4 stars
The Rolling Stone Jazz Record Guide	3/5 stars
Tom Hull	B+

The Penguin Guide to Jazz called it a "reflective album, but it is by no means sombre" stating "Abercrombie seems to like the open rhythmic weave and plays acoustically with great confidence and finely controlled timbre and dynamics. Holland is by no means playing at his best but he is incapable of mere journeywork and asserts his presence in the harmonic transitions in a way that more than makes up for the absence of keyboards."

The AllMusic review by Scott Yanow states, "The interplay between the three musicians is quite impressive although listeners might find some of the music to be quite unsettling. It takes several listens for one to digest all that is going on, but it is worth the struggle."

== Track listing ==
All tracks are written by Dave Holland except as noted.

Side I
No.	Title	Length
1.	"Back-Woods Song"	7:51
2.	"Waiting"	2:10
3.	"May Dance"	11:01
Total length:		21:02

Side II
No.	Title	Writer(s)	Length
1.	"Unshielded Desire"	Jack DeJohnette; John Abercrombie	4:49
2.	"Jamala"		4:47
3.	"Sorcery I"	DeJohnette	10:56
Total length:			20:32 41:34

== Personnel ==
Gateway

- John Abercrombie – guitar
- Dave Holland – bass
- Jack DeJohnette – drums
