= Danny Gottlieb discography =

This is the discography of American drummer Danny Gottlieb.

== As leader ==
- Aquamarine (Atlantic, 1987) with John Mclaughlin, Joe Satriani, John Abercrombie, Mitchel Forman
- Whirlwind (Atlantic, 1989) with Chuck Loeb, Mark Egan
- Brooklyn Blues (Big World, 1991) with Gil Goldstein, John Abercrombie, Jeremy Steig, Chip Jackson
- Beautiful Ballads (Nicolosi Productions, 2005), with Mark Soskin and Chip Jackson
- Jazz Standards (Nicolosi), with Andy Laverne and Chip Jackson
- A.S.A.P (ITM Pacific), with Andy Laverne, Bill Washer, Chip Jackson
- Back to the Past (Nicolosi, 2016), with guest interviews with Don Lamond, and Joe Morello

With Elements

- Elements (Antilles, 1982)
- Forward Motion (Antilles, 1983)
- Illumination (BMG, 1984)
- Liberal Arts (BMG, 1985)
- Spirit River (BMG, 1986)
- Live in the Far East, Vol. 1 (Wavetone, 1987)
- Live in the Far East Vol. 2 (Wavetone, 1988)
- Untold Stories (Wavetone, 1989)
- Blown Away (Wavetone, 1985)

With Pete Levin

- The New Age of Christmas (Atlantic, 1990)
- Masters in this Hall (Levin Productions, 1998)

With Per Daniellson

- Gottlieb-Danielson Project (Clavebop, 2004)

== As sideman ==
With Joe Beck

- Finger Painting (1995)
- Just Friends (2003)

With Jeff Berlin

- In Harmony's Way (2001)
- Lumpy Jazz (2004)

With the Blues Brothers

- Red, White, and Blues (1984)
- Live in Montreux (1989)
- Live at the House of Blues, Chicago, with Dan Aykroyd (1998)

With Jeff Ciampa

- Signs of Life (1997)
- Jeff Ciampa (2003)

With Contempo Trio

- No Jamf's Allowed (1991)
- Secret of Life (2003)

With Al Di Meola

- Soaring Through a Dream (1985)

With Mark Egan

- Mosaic (1985)
- Touch of Light (1989)
- Beyond Words (1990)
- Freedom Town (2001)
- As We Speak (2006)

With Bill Evans

- Living in the Crest of a Wave (1983)
- Alternative Man (1985)

With Gil Evans Orchestra

- Bud and Bird (1986)
- Farewell (1986)
- Gil Evans Orchestra Tribute (1989)
- The Honey Man (1995)
- Live in Perugia, Vol. 1 (2000)
- Live in Perugia, Vol. 2 (2001)
- Gil Evans Orchestra 75th Birthday Concert live at BBC (2001)

With Gil Goldstein

- Sands of Time (1980)
- Wrapped in a Cloud (1980)

With George Gruntz

- Beyond Another Wall – Live in China (1992)
- Cosmopolitan Greetings (1994)
- Global Excellence (2001)
- The Magic of a Flute (2005)
- Tiger by the Tail (2006)
- Radio Days (2007)

With Haru

- Galactic Age (1992)
- Live at 55 Bar, New York City (2000)
- Live in Japan (2001)

With Jonas Hellborg

- Axis (1988)
- Bass (1988)

With Toninho Horta

- Moonstone (1989)
- Foot on the Road (1994)

With Nando Lauria

- Points of View (1994)
- Novo Brazil (1996)

With Pete Levin

- Party in the Basement (1989)
- Deacon Blues (2007)

With Andy LaVerne

- Andy LaVerne Plays the Music of Chick Corea (Jazzline, 1981)
- Frozen Music (SteepleChase, 1989)
- Stan Getz in Chappaqua (1997)
- Epistrophy (2003)
- Peace of Mind (2005)

With Hubert Laws

- Say it with Silence (1978)
- Malaguena (1996)

With David Mathews

- Tennessee Waltz, featuring John Schofield (1989)
- David Mathews Manhattan Jazz Orchestra (1991)

With John McLaughlin

- Adventures in Radioland (1985)
- Live at Montreux (2004)

With Pat Metheny

- Watercolors (1977)
- Pat Metheny Group (1978)
- American Garage (1979)
- Offramp (1982)
- Travels (1983)
- Secret Story (1992)

With NDR Big Band

- Music of Astor Piazzolla (2007)
- I Concentrate on You (2007)

With Vince Nerlino

- Vince Nerlino Trio (2000)
- Vince Nerlino Group (2003)

With Nguyen Le

- First Act
- Three Trios (1997)

With Richard Niles

- Santa Rita (1998)
- Club De Ranged (1999)

With Chuck Owen and the Jazz Surge

- Madcap (2001)
- Here We Are (2004)

With Pablo Paredes

- Pablo Paredes (2005)
- Africa (2007)

With Fritz Renold

- Starlight (1998)
- Live in Thailand

With Ali Ryerson

- I'll Be Back (1993)
- Portraits in Silver (1994)
- Quiet Devotion (1997)

With Sergio Salvatore

- Sergio Salvatore (1993)
- Tune Up (1994)

With Stan Samole

- Gliding (1990)
- Stan Samole (1995)

With Kenneth Sivertsen

- Remembering North (1993)
- One Day in October (2000)

With Lew Soloff

- My Romance (1994)
- Rainbow Mountain (2000)

With Richard Stoltzman

- Inner Voices (1989)
- Brazil (1991)
- Open Sky (1998)

Soundtracks

- Children of the Corn (1986)
- Turner and Hooch (1994)
- Punchline (1995)
- Family Thing (1996)

With Dino Betti van der Noot

- Here Comes Springtime (1985)
- They Cannot Know (1986)
- They Cannot Know (1987)

With Knut Varnes

- Super Duper
- 8/97 (1997)

With Jeremy Wall

- Cool Running (1991)
- Stepping to the New World (1992)

With others

- Gary Burton Quartet with Eberhard Weber – Passengers (ECM, 1976)
- Warren Bernhardt – Ain't Life Grand (1980)
- Mitch Farber – Star Climber (1982)
- Jim Pepper – Comin' and Goin' (Europa, 1983)
- Bob Moses – Visit with the Great Spirit (1983)
- Scott Cossu – Islands (1984)
- Michael Franks – Skin Dive (1985)
- Eliane Elias and Randy Brecker – Amanda (1985)
- Patrick Williams – New York 10th Avenue (1986)
- Randy Bernsen – Mo' Wasabi (1986)
- T Lavitz – From the West (1987)
- Sting and Gil Evans – Last Session (1987)
- Michael Zilber – Heretic (1988)
- Central Park Kids – Play Mozart (1990)
- Michael Gerber and Mark Knobel (1990)
- Tom Malone – Standards of Living (1991)
- Lee Ann Legerwood – You Wish (1991)
- New York Voices – Hearts of Fire (1991)
- Bob Brookmeyer – Electricity (1991)
- Jim Hall – Youkali (1992)
- The Connection – Inside Out (1992)
- Patti Dunham – Repertoire (1992)
- Fred Miller – What's Wrong with This Picture (1993)
- Dina Carroll – So Close (1993)
- Clifford Carter – Walking into the Sun (1993)
- Mann Brothers – Mann to Mann (1993)
- Ben Sidran – Life's a Lesson (1994)
- Helen Schneider – Right as Rain with WDR Big Band (1995)
- Manhattan Jazz Orchestra – Morita (1995)
- Matalex – Indian Summer (1995)
- Sherri Roberts – Dreamsville (1996)
- Boca Livre – Americana (1996)
- The Prodigal Sons – Stranger Things Have Happened (1996)
- Sting – Strange Fruit (1997)
- Doug Munro – Shootin' Pool at Leo's (1997)
- Nnenna Freelon – Maiden Voyage (1998)
- Michael Gerber – This is Michael Gerber (1998)
- Anita Gravine – Lights, Camera, Passion (1999)
- Loren Schoenberg – Out of this World (1999)
- Hue and Cry – Jazz, Not Jazz (1996)
- Neil Sedaka – Tales of Love (1999)
- Jack Lee – From Belo to Seoul (2000)
- Michael Whalen – Mysterious Ways (2001)
- Jack Wilkins – Ridge Running (2002)
- Stanley Jordan – Dreams of Peace (2003)
- Michael Hammer – Rhythm and Blues (2005)
- Per Danielsson Trio – Dream Dancing (2005)
- Ken Serio – Eye to Eye (2005)
- Lutz Buechner – Ring (2005)
- Muriel Anderson – Wildcat (2006)
- Kristin Lomholt – Spell (2006)
- HR Big Band Live with Jack Bruce – More Jack than Blues (2008)
- Alex Clements – Waiting for You (2008)
- Steven Curtis Chapman – Joy (2012)
