= Antilles Records =

American record label

- Parent company: Island Records
- Founded: 1975
- Founder: Jeff Walker
- Status: Active
- Distributor: Verve
- Genre: Jazz
- Country of origin: U.S.

Antilles Records was a record label founded as a division of Island Records. It began as a jazz label, recording Joanne Brackeen, Biréli Lagrène, and Phil Woods, though its catalogue did expand to include eclectic musicians like Brian Eno and Robert Fripp. It was the first to introduce the Slits and Nick Drake to American audiences. One of its founders was Jeff Walker, an employee at Island and the first A&R director for Antilles.

In the 1990s, Antilles recorded Peter Apfelbaum, Johnny Griffin, Frank Morgan, Steve Turre, and Randy Weston. PolyGram bought Island, Seagram bought Polygram, and by the end of the decade Antilles stopped recording jazz.

== Discography ==
- AN-1001 – Joanne Brackeen: Special Identity (1982)
- AN-1002 – Biréli Lagrène: Routes to Django (1980)
- AN-1003 – Heath Brothers: Brotherly Love (1981)
- AN-1004 – Ben Sidran: Old Songs for the New Depression (1981)
- AN-1005 – Anthony Braxton: Six Compositions: Quartet (1981)
- AN-1006 – Phil Woods: Birds of a Feather (1981)
- AN-1007 – Air: 80° Below '82 (1982)
- AN-1008 – Ronald Shannon Jackson and the Decoding Society: Mandance (1982)
- AN-1009 – Biréli Lagrène: 15 (1982)
- AN-1010 – Gil Evans: Priestess (1977 [1983])
- AN-1011 – Zahara: Flight of the Spirit (1983)
- AN-1012 – Ben Sidran: Bop City (1983)
- AN-1013 – Phil Woods: Phil Woods at the Vanguard (1982)
- AN-1014 – Swingrass '83: Swingrass '83 (1982)
- AN-1015 – Ronald Shannon Jackson: Barbeque Dog (1983)
- AN-1016 – Heath Brothers: Brothers and Others (1983)
- AN-1017 – Elements: Elements (1982)
- AN-1018 – Steve Khan: Eyewitness (1981)
- AN-1019 – Biréli Lagrène: Down in Town (1983)
- AN-1020 – Steve Khan: Casa Loco (1983)
- AN-1021 – Elements: Forward Motion (1983)
- AN-2001 – Ornette Coleman: Of Human Feelings (1979)
- AX-7000 – V.A.: The Greater Antilles Sampler, 1976
- AN-7001 – Fripp & Eno: No Pussyfooting (reissue), 1976
- AN-7002 – The Portsmouth Sinfonia (Conductor: John Farley): Hallelujah (At The Royal Albert Hall), 1976
- AN-7003 – Ashley Hutchings & John Kirkpatrick: The Compleat Dancing Master, 1976
- AN-7004 – Morning Glory Featuring John Surman: Morning Glory, 1976
- AN-7005 – Remi Kabaka, Abdul Lasisi Amao, Steve Winwood: Aiye-Keta (reissue), 1976
- AN-7006 – Henry Wolff, Nancy Hennings With Drew Gladstone: Tibetan Bells (reissue), 1976
- AN-7007 – Jimmy Reed: Cold Chills (reissue), 1975
- AN-7008 – Quiet Sun: Mainstream, 1975
- AN-7009 – Hugh Delain: Harry Warren's Piano Vignettes, 1976
- AN-7010 – Nick Drake: Five Leaves Left (reissue), 1976
- AN-7011 – White Noise: An Electric Storm (reissue), 1976
- AN-7012 – Grimms: Rockin' Duck, 1976
- AN-7013 – Willie Mabon: Sings "I Don't Know" and Other Chicago Blues Hits (reissue), 1976
- AN-7014 – Country Gazette: Country Gazette Live, 1976
- AN-7015 – Sousa / Antonin Kubalek: Other Sides of Sousa, 1976
- AN-7016 – Osamu Kitajima: Benzaiten, 1976
- AN-7017 – Shirley Collins and the Albion Country Band: No Roses, 1976
- AN-7018 – Fripp & Eno: Evening Star (reissue), 1976
- AN-7020 – The Watersons: For Pence and Spicy Ale, 1976
- AN-7021 – Frankie Armstrong: Songs and Ballads, 1976
- AN-7022 – Mississippi Fred McDowell: Somebody Keeps Callin' Me (reissue), 1976
- AN-7023 – Tim Hardin: Nine, 1976
- AN-7024 – Earl Hooker: Funk – Last of the Great Earl Hooker Featuring Jeff Karp (reissue), 1976
- AN-7025 – Detroit Jr.: Chicago Urban Blues (reissue), 1976
- AN-7026 – Allen Fontenot & The Country Cajuns: Cajun Music, 1977
- AN-7027 – Albion Country Band: Battle of the Field, 1976
- AN-7028 – Nick Drake: Bryter Layter (reissue), 1976
- AN-7029 – Gay & Terry Woods: The Time Is Right, 1976
- AN-7030 – Brian Eno: Discreet Music, 1975
- AN-7031 – Jan Steele & John Cage: Voices and Instruments, 1976
- AN-7032 – Assalam Aleikoum Africa, Volume 1 (Progressive and Popular Music of West Africa), 1976
- AN-7033 – Assalam Aleikoum Africa, Volume 2 (Traditional and Modern Folk Music of West Africa), 1976
- AN-7034 – Don Cherry: Eternal Now (reissue), 1976
- AN-7035 – Johnny Dyani, Okay Temiz, Mongezi Feza: Music For Xaba (reissue), 1976
- AN-7039 – The City Waites: A Gorgeous Gallery of Gallant Inventions, 1977
- AN-7040 – Gary Shearston: Dingo, 1977
- AN-7041 – Martin Carthy & Dave Swarbrick: Selections, 1976
- AN-7042 – Tom Newman: Fine Old Tom, 1977
- AN-7043 – June Tabor: Airs and Graces, 1977
- AN-7044 – Sparks: Kimono My House (reissue), 1977
- AN-7045 – Jade Warrior: Floating World (reissue), 1977
- AN-7046 – Spooky Tooth: The Mirror (reissue), 1977
- AN-7047 – Peter Cook & Dudley Moore: Good Evening, 1977
- AN-7048 – Jade Warrior: Waves (reissue), 1977
- AN-7052 – The Wild Tchoupitoulas: The Wild Tchoupitoulas (reissue), 1978
- AN-7053 – Jorge Ben: Samba Nova (reissue), 1978
- AN-7054 – Fairport Featuring Dave Swarbrick: Gottle O'Geer, 1978
- AN-7055 – Jorge Ben: Tropical (reissue), 1978
- AN-7056 – Jade Warrior: Kites (reissue), 1978
- AN-7057 – Automatic Man: Automatic Man (reissue), 1978
- AN-7058 – Osibisa: Ojah Awake (reissue), 1978
- AN-7061 – Osamu Kitajima: Osamu, 1978
- AN-7062 – Automatic Man: Visitors (reissue), 1978
- AN-7063 – John Cale: Guts, 1978
- AN-7065 – Klaus Schulze: Body Love – Additions To The Original Soundtrack, 1978
- AN-7066 – Ian Gillan Band: Scarabus (reissue), 1978
- AN-7067 – V.A.: No New York, 1978
- AN-7068 – Jade Warrior: Way of the Sun, 1978
- AN-7069 – Ultravox: Systems of Romance, 1978
- AN-7070 – Brian Eno: Music For Films, 1978
- AN-7071 – Roomful of Blues: Let's Have A Party, 1979
- AN-7072 – The Rivits: Multiplay, 1980
- AN-7075 – Kim Fowley: Snake Document Masquerade, 1979
- AN-7076 – Blackfoot: No Reservations (reissue), 1979
- AN-7077 – The Slits: Cut, 1979
- AN-7078 – Kid Creole & The Coconuts: Off the Coast of Me, 1980
- AN-7079 – Ultravox: Three Into One compilation, 1980
- AN-7080 – Suicide: Suicide (Alan Vega, Martin Rev), 1980
- AN-7081 – John Martyn: Grace & Danger, 1980
- AN-7082 – Basement 5: 1965-1980, 1981
- AN-7083 – V.A.: Hicks From The Sticks, 1980
- AN-7084 – V.A.: The Uproar Tapes, Volume 1, 1986
- AN-7085 – The Africans: Original Soundtrack Album From The Television Series, 1986
- AN-7086 – Bert Seager Jazz Quintet: Time To Burn, 1986
- AN-7087 – The Big Easy (original motion picture soundtrack), 1987
- AN-7088 – Bert Seager Jazz Quintet: Because They Can, 1988
- AN-8700 – Courtney Pine: Journey to the Urge Within, 1986
- AN-8701 – Naná Vasconcelos: Bush Dance, 1986
- AN-8702 – David Mann: Games, 1987
- AN-8703 – Samuel Zyman: Bashe, 1987
- AN-8704 – Jeff Beal: Liberation, 1987
- AN-8705 – Helcio Milito: Kilombo, 1987
- AN-8706 – Jim Pepper: Comin' and Goin', 1987
- AN-8707 – Philip Glass: Koyaanisqatsi, 1987
- AN-8708 – Startled Insects: Curse of the Pheromones, 1987
- AN-8709 – Angel Heart (original motion picture soundtrack), 1987
- AN-8710 – Daniel Ponce: Arawe, 1987
- AN-8711 – The Lodge: Smell of a Friend, 1988
- AN-8712 – Jazz Warriors: Out of Many, One People, 1987
- AN-8713 – She's Gotta Have It (original motion picture soundtrack), 1986
- AN-8714 – Lounge Lizards: No Pain For Cakes, 1987
- AN-8715 – Power Tools: Strange Meeting, 1987
- AN-8717 – Gil Evans: Priestess (reissue), 1987
- AN-8719 – Gary Windo: Deep Water, 1988
- AN-8720 – Andy Sheppard: Andy Sheppard, 1987
- AN-8722 – Laszlo Gardony: The Secret, 1988
- AN-8723 – Yomo Toro: Funky Jibaro, 1988
- AN-8725 – Courtney Pine: Destiny's Song + The Image of Pursuance, 1988
- AN-8726 – Michał Urbaniak: Folk Songs, Children's Melodies, Jazz Tunes, And Others..., 1988
- AN-8727 – Dizrhythmia: Dizrhythmia, 1988
- AN-8729 – Jay Azzolina: Never Too Late, 1988
- AN-8730 – Defunkt: In America, 1988
- AN-8732 – Rob Prester: Trillium, 1988
- AN-8733 – Cornell Dupree & Who It Is: Coast To Coast, 1988
- AN-8737 – Paranoise: Constant Fear, 1988
- AN-8738 – Samuel Zyman: Concerto For Piano & Chamber Ensemble, 1989
- AN-8739 – Dagmar Krause: Tank Battles: The Songs of Hanns Eisler, 1988
- AN-8741 – Nana Vasconcelos & The Bushdancers: Rain Dance, 1989
- AN-8742 – Andy Sheppard: Introductions in the Dark, 1989
- AN-8743 – Danny Thompson: Whatever Next, 1989
- AN-8745 – Mississippi Burning (original motion picture soundtrack), 1989
- AN-8746 – Courtney Pine: The Vision's Tale, 1989
- AN-8747 – Microgroove: The Human Groove, 1989
- AN-8748 – Frank Morgan: Mood Indigo, 1989
- AN-8749 – Laszlo Gardony: The Legend of Tsumi, 1989
- AN-8750 – Allen Ginsberg: The Lion For Real, 1989
- AN-8751 – Andy Sheppard: Soft on the Inside, 1990
- AN-8753 – Danny Thompson and Whatever: Elemental, 1990
- AN-8754 – Evan Lurie: Selling Water By the Side of the River, 1990
- AN-8755 – The Hot Spot (original motion picture soundtrack), 1990
- AN-8756 – Courtney Pine: Within the Realms of Our Dreams, 1991
