= Jade Warrior =

Jade Warrior may refer to:

- Jade Warrior (film), a Finnish-Chinese movie
- Jade Warrior (band), an English progressive rock band
  - Jade Warrior (album), an album by Jade Warrior
- Jade Warriors, a webcomic from Red Giant Entertainment
- Jade Warriors, a comic book series from Image Comics
