= Kecak =

Indonesian traditional dance

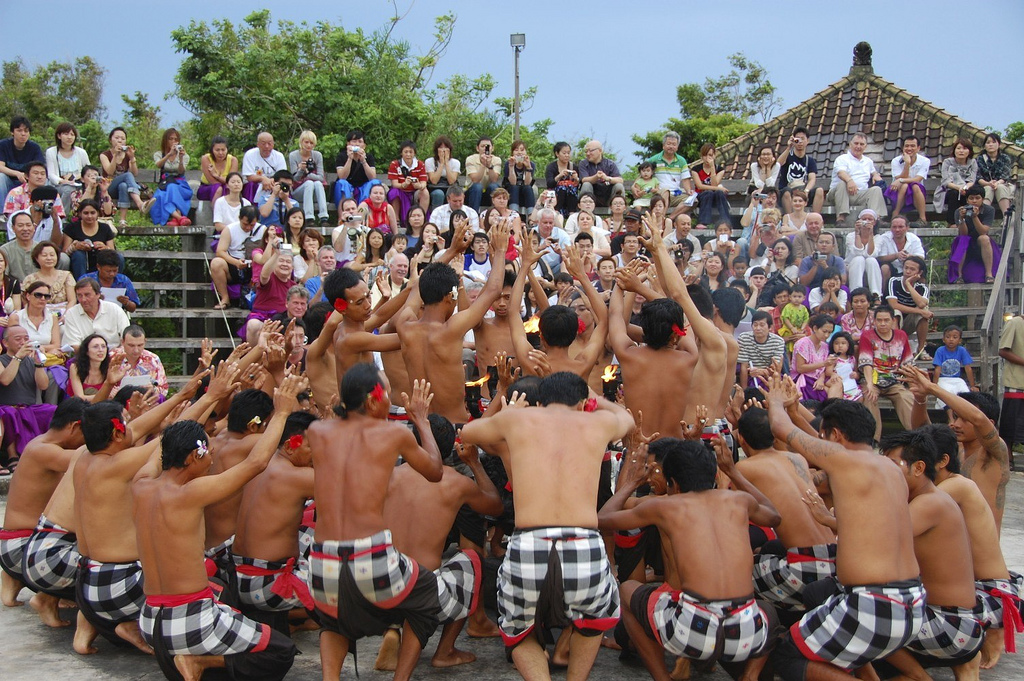
- Kecak dancers in Uluwatu
- Native name: ᬓᬾᬘᬓ᭄ (Balinese); Tari Kecak (Indonesian)
- Genre: Traditional dance
- Instrument(s): Gamelan, Gong, Kendhang
- Origin: Indonesia

Kecak (also spelled kécak, ketjak and kechak; Balinese: ᬓᬾᬘᬓ᭄) or tari kecak (Indonesian pronunciation: [ˌt̪ari ˈket͡ʃak̚]), is a form of Balinese Hindu dance popularized in the 1930s. Since its creation, it has been performed primarily by men, with the first women's kecak group having started in 2006. The dance is based on the story of the Ramayana and is traditionally performed in temples and villages across Bali, Indonesia.

Also known as the Ramayana monkey chant, the dance is performed by a circle of as many as 150 performers wearing checked cloths around their waists, percussively chanting "chak", and moving their hands and arms. The performance depicts a battle of the Ramayana, in which the monkey-like Vanaras, led by Hanuman, help Prince Rama fight the evil King Ravana. Kecak has roots in sanghyang, a trance-inducing exorcism dance.

== History ==
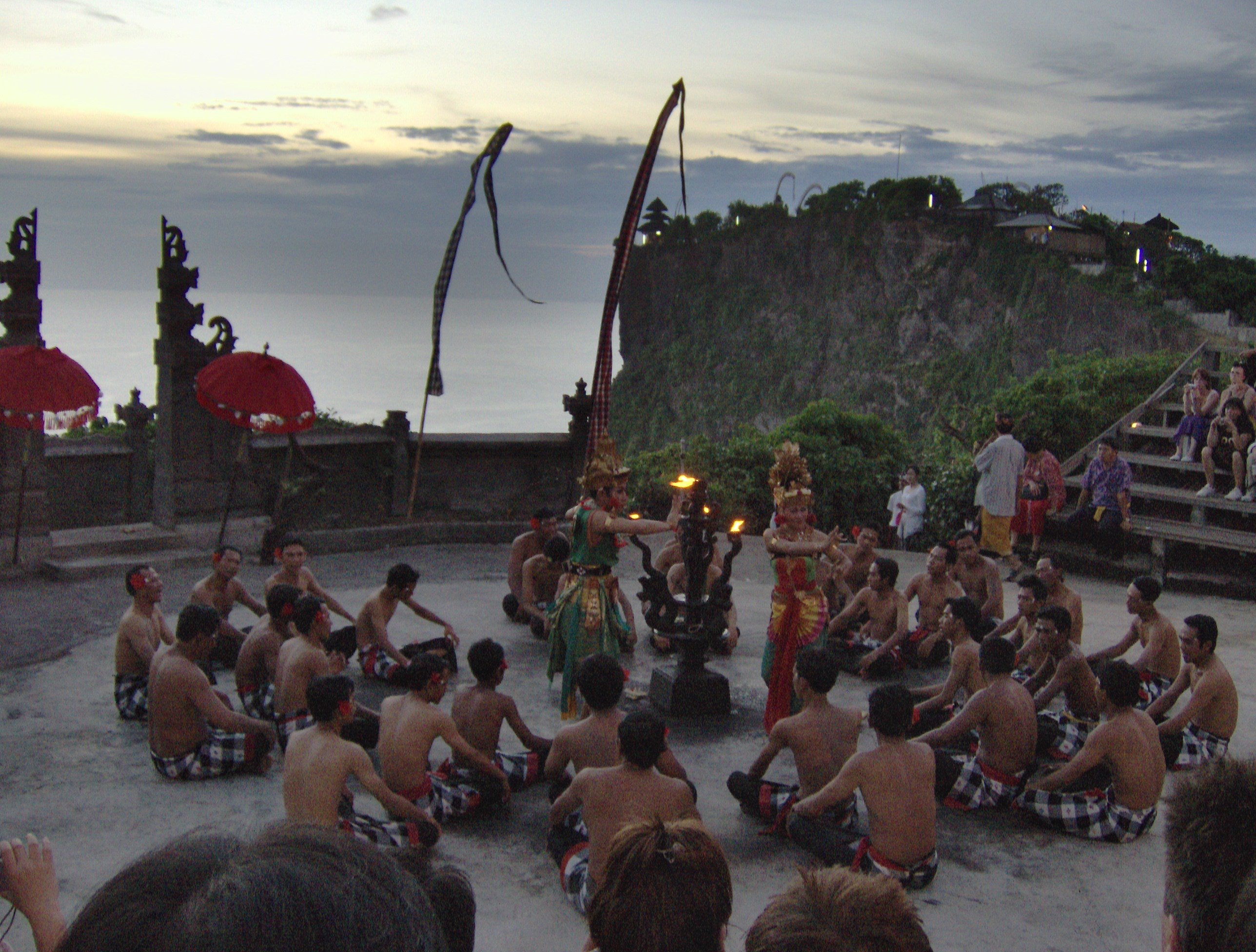
A kecak dance being performed at Uluwatu, in Bali

Kecak was originally a trance ritual accompanied by a male chorus.

In the 1930s, Walter Spies, a German painter and musician, became deeply interested in the ritual while living in Bali. He adapted it as a drama based on the Hindu Ramayana and including dance, intended for performance before Western tourist audiences.

Walter Spies worked with Indonesian dancer Wayan Limbak, who popularized the dance by arranging internationally touring performances by Balinese groups. These tours helped make the kecak internationally known.

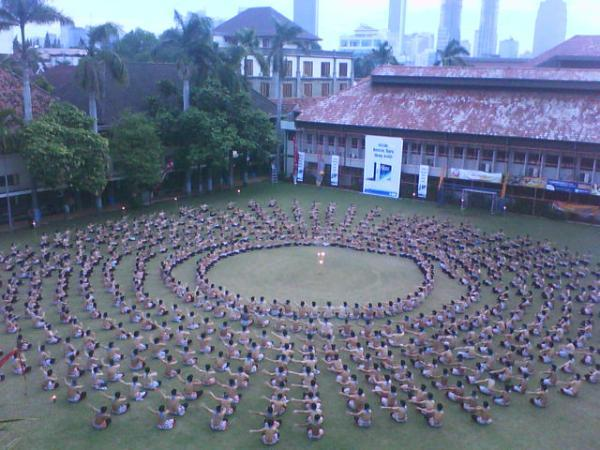
A kecak dance being performed at Kolese Kanisius, Jakarta

This is an example of what James Clifford describes as part of the "modern art-culture system" in which "the West or the central power adopts, transforms, and consumes non-Western or peripheral cultural elements, while making 'art,' which was once embedded in the culture as a whole, into a separate entity". I Wayan Dibia, a performer, choreographer and scholar, suggests, by contrast, that the Balinese were already developing this form when Spies arrived on the island. For example, during the 1920s, Limbak had incorporated baris movements into the cak leader role. "Spies liked this innovation," and he suggested that Limbak "devise a spectacle based on the Ramayana," accompanied by cak chorus rather than gamelan, as would have been usual.

== Performance ==
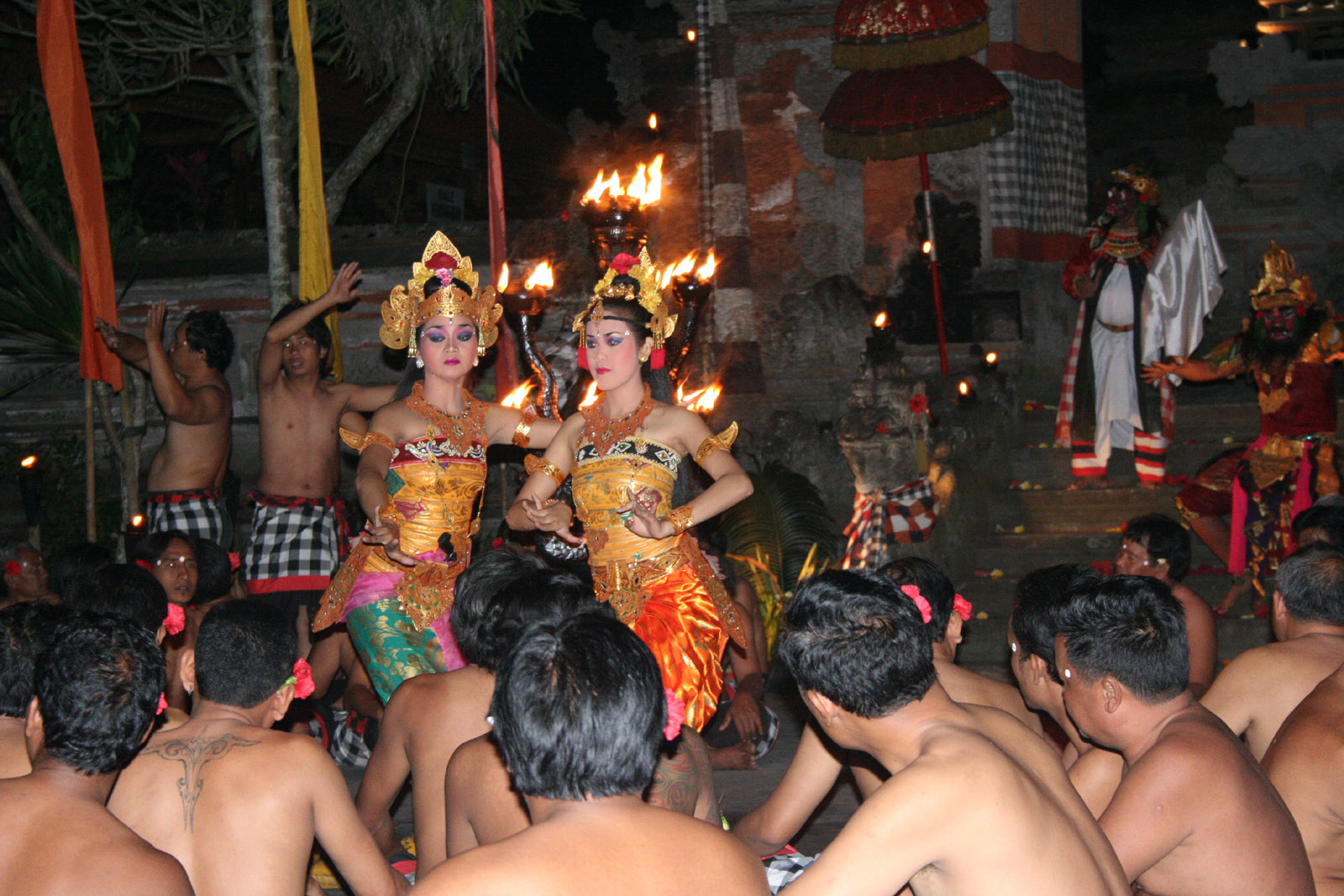
Kecak dance at the Pura Dalem Temple in Ubud, Bali.

The kecak dance is typically performed by about fifty to one hundred men wearing only loincloths; their upper bodies are left bare. They form concentric circles, in the middle of which is a traditional Balinese coconut oil lamp. First they move their bodies rhythmically to the left and to the right, chanting the words "chak ke-chak ke-chak ke-chak" continuously in coordinated harmony and beat, in slow rhythm. Gradually the rhythm speeds up and by turns they lift their hands, trembling, into the air. The kecak sound can be classified as a "musical" performance with the use of the human voice purely with no musical instruments. The dance is performed for dance-dramas and the story presented is taken from the Ramayana Hindu epic. The bare-chested male kecak chanters play the role of Rama's troops of Vanaras (apes) and Ravana's troops of Rakshasas (Demons).

The duration of the performance is around an hour. The story of the Ramayana is depicted, beginning with Sita and Rama's exile in the jungle of Dandaka. The performance reenacts the appearance of the Golden Deer, the abduction of Sita by Ravana, the battle between Ravana and Jatayu, the search for Sita by Hanuman, and ends with the battle between Rama and Ravana. The kecak chanters chant and sing in accordance with the mood and milieu of the story.

Kecak dance performances in Bali usually take place daily in the evening (6 pm, Bali time) at Balinese Hindu temples such as Uluwatu Temple and Tanah Lot. There are also dance stages used exclusively for kecak performances in Ubud, Garuda Wisnu Kencana, Batu Bulan, Pandawa beach and other places in Bali. Kecak performances also take place on other occasions, such as for cultural and entertainment displays. Dancers usually come from local villagers of the surrounding area of the performance; they usually have a main job other than dancing which they finish before performing the kecak dance. The dancers' income from the dance usually comes from tickets sold to the spectators. The most popular destination for kechak dance performances is Uluwatu Temple.

=== Dancers ===
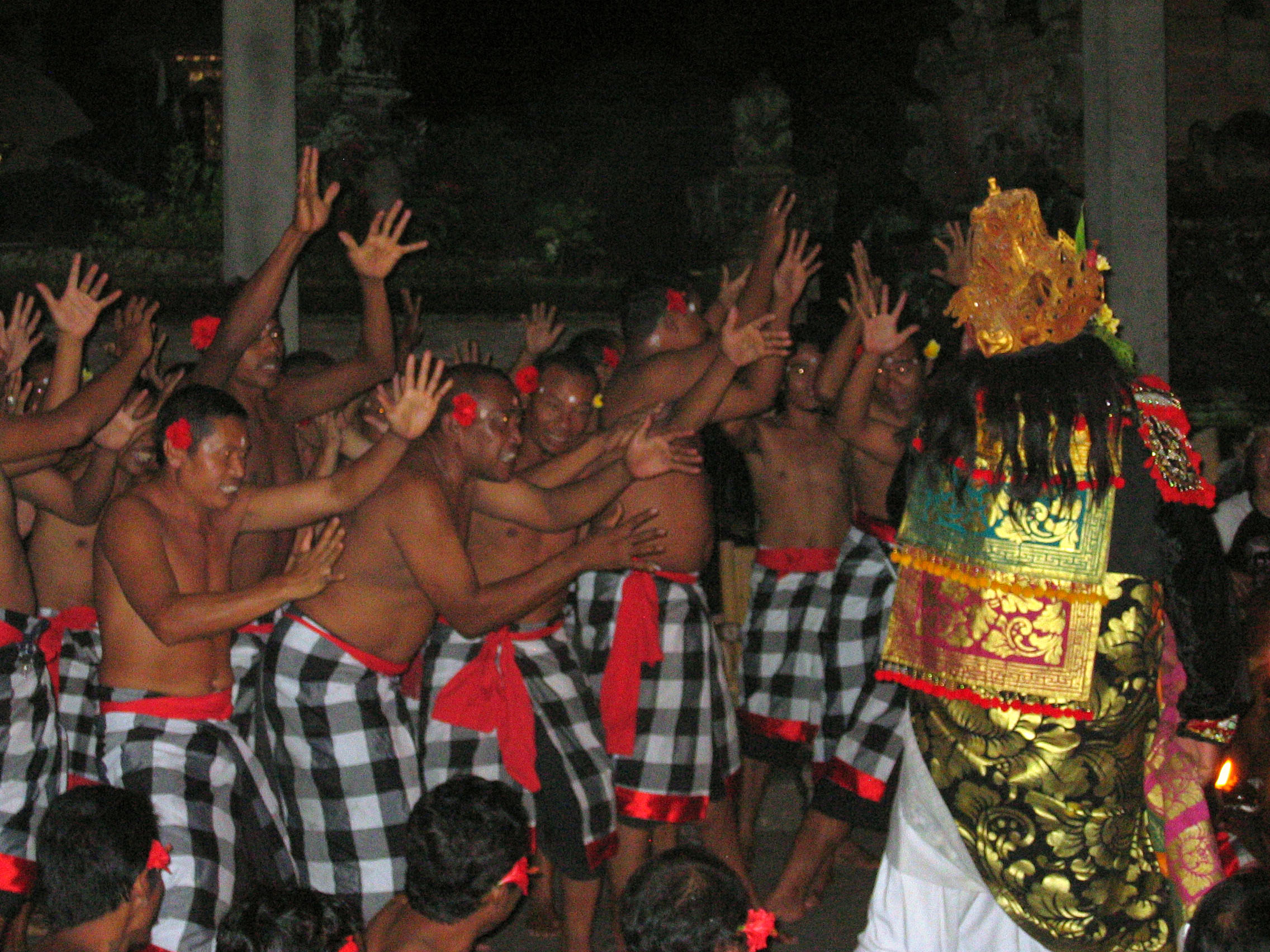
Kecak dancers chant facing the dancer playing as Ravana.

The dancers consist of two types: the kecak male-chanters and the main Ramayana dancers who play the roles of Sita, Rama, Lakshmana, Ravana, Hanuman, Jatayu, etc. Some of the kecak male-chanters who chant chak-chak-chak have their own tasks during the performance. One individual is responsible for maintaining the beat of the chant by chanting "po-po-po-po". Another man serves as the leader of the chorus, instructing them to stop or start the chanting by yelling command vocals such as "Diih!", "Chiaaat!", etc. There is also a man whose job is to sing during the chanting; he sings in a melodious or rhythmic tone according to the situation of the dance with vocalizations such as "Shiiir-yang-ngger-yang-nggur-yang-nggeer". Another man, known as the dalang, narrates the story during the dance, usually in Balinese and Sanskrit. The men chosen for these tasks are usually the senior male dancers. The remaining chanters chant "chak-chak-chak" continuously and simultaneously with harmony.

The dancers who represent the core Ramayana characters are considered an essential part of the dance. Rama, Sita, Lakshmana, and the Golden Deer, whose movements are gentle and smooth, are sometimes played by female dancers who are trained in such styles of movement. Men play muscular characters such as Ravan, Hanuman, Sugriv, etc.

=== Trance ===
Trance rituals often accompany certain sections of the kecak dance, such as during the portrayal of the burning of Hanuman. Here, the dancer playing Hanuman is blessed by a priest and enters a trance state for the fire kicking dance which follows. The dancer does not feel any pain from the fire because he is in a state of trance.

== In popular culture ==
Excerpts of kecak can be heard on the soundtracks of the following movies:

- Edipo Re by Pier Paolo Pasolini (1967)
- Fellini Satyricon (1969)
- Incontro d'amore (1970)
- The 1971 version of Kenneth Anger's Rabbit's Moon
- I Never Promised You a Rose Garden (1977)
- The 1982 Japanese Metal Hero Series Space Sheriff Gavan episode 6: "The Geniuses of the Makuu School"
- The soundtrack to the Coen Brothers' 1984 debut film Blood Simple includes a track entitled "Monkey Chant" which is based on kecak.
- Dagger of Kamui (Kamui no Ken) (1985)
- Akira (1988), which also features the Indonesian gamelan.
- The end credits and fight scenes of animated series Avatar: The Last Airbender (2005)
- In the 2010 documentary SAS: The Search for Warriors Part 1, a recording of the kecak was used to wake up the recruits.
- In an part from Mitsuri's theme in Demon Slayer: Kimetsu no Yaiba.

Scenes including kecak dance may be glimpsed in:

- David Attenborough's 1969 BBC documentary The Miracle of Bali, (episodes 1 and 3)
- The Italian movie Incontro d'amore (1970)
- The Indonesian movie Mama (1972)
- An extended kecak chant scene is featured at the end of Emmanuelle 2 (1975).
- The Indonesian movie Noesa Penida (1988)
- Ron Fricke's film Baraka (1992)
- Tarsem Singh's film The Fall (2006)
- The Indonesian television station Bali TV uses audio of kecak chanting with the visuals of Rangda and Topeng Tua mask dances in their program's opening theme sequence since 2011.

Kecak is featured in several video games:

- Sounds of gamelan and kecak chants were incorporated into the soundtrack of the 1993 video game Secret of Mana / Seiken Densetsu II, in a track titled "The Oracle".
- A sample of kecak chanting mixed with Balinese gamelan can be heard in the SNK Neo Geo arcade video game The King of Fighters '97, when the gameplay shows a Bali arena scene. The arena also includes background animation of kecak chanters on the right side, Barong dance in the center, and gamelan performers with a crowded audience on the left side.
- A visual representation of the dance can be seen in the Ritual Passion level of Tetris Effect, beating in time to the player's actions.
- In Dota 2, kecak sounds make up sound effect for ultimate ability of Monkey King.

...and in popular music:

- 1974: A sample of kecak chanting is featured in the song "Money Chant" by Jade Warrior on their album Floating World.
- 1978: A sample of kecak chanting can be heard in the song "Jocko Homo" by Devo from the album Q: Are We Not Men? A: We Are Devo!
- 1981: The Tokyo electronic trio Yellow Magic Orchestra incorporated samples of kecak chanting on the song "Neue Tanz" from their album Technodelic. This was achieved through the use of the custom-made Toshiba LMD-649, one of the first digital samplers.
- 1982: A sample of kecak chanting can be heard in the Nurse With Wound track "I Cannot Feel You as the Dogs Are Laughing and I Am Blind" from the album Homotopy to Marie.
- 1983: A sample of kecak chanting can be heard in the song "Soldier of Fortune" from Manhattan Transfer's album Bodies and Souls.
- 1985: Todd Rundgren used an E-mu Emulator to sample his voice into a kecak chant on the song "Blue Orpheus" from his album A Cappella.
- 1987: A sample of kecak chanting is in "The Wind Chimes", from Mike Oldfield's album Islands.
- 1987: The Indonesian song "Kembalikan Baliku", written by Guruh Sukarnoputra and performed by Yopie Latul for the World Popular Song Festival 1987 in Tokyo, Japan, incorporates kecak chanting in the interlude performed by backing vocals. The song received the Kawakami Audience Selection Award (ASA).
- 1991: The San Francisco art rock band Oxbow's songs "Daughter" and "Daughter Bent & Floating" from their album King of the Jews incorporates kecak-inspired polyrhythmic chanting and clapping.
- 1992: A sample is prominently featured on "Magical Wave" from Kitarō's album Dream.
- 1995: The German electronic band RMB used kecak chanting in their song "Chakka Chakka" on the album This World Is Yours.
- 1999: Mike Patton performs a kecak-like chant in the song "Goodbye Sober Day" on the Mr. Bungle album California.

The sound of kecak has inspired other artists:

- John Adams' opera, A Flowering Tree (2006), features Kumudha and the beggar minstrels in Act II, which are based on the kecak.
- Ketjak is a book-length poem by Ron Silliman published in 1978 and reprinted in The Age of Huts (2007), in which the author gives the title "Ketjak" to a vast ongoing cycle of works which includes Tjanting (1980) and The Alphabet (2008).
- Devaraalan aattam, a song composed by A. R. Rahman for Ponniyin Selvan 1, a 2022 Tamil film directed by Mani Ratnam.

== See also ==
- Pendet
- Legong
- Balinese dance
- Dance of Indonesia

== Bibliography ==
- Kecak from Bali. Produced by David Lewiston, 1990. One compact disc (duration 44:53) with notes and libretto by Fred B. Eiseman and David Lewiston.
- I Wayan Dibia, Kecak: the vocal chant of Bali. Denpasar: Hartanto Art Books, 1996. vi + 83pp. ISBN 979-95045-4-6.
