= Magic Fingers (Chuck Loeb and Andy LaVerne album) =

Studio album by Chuck Loeb and Andy Laverne
- Released: 1990
- Recorded: October 5, 6, 12–13, 1989
- Studio: Clinton Recording Studios (New York City, New York); Digital Music Products, Inc. (Stamford, Connecticut)
- Genre: Jazz
- Length: 54:19
- Label: DMP; CD-472
- Producer: Chuck Loeb; Tom Jung; Andy LaVerne

Chuck Loeb chronology
My Shining Hour (1989)	Magic Fingers (1990)	Life Colors (1990)

Andy LaVerne chronology
Fountainhead (1989)	Magic Fingers (1989)	Natural Living (1989)

Magic Fingers is an album by guitarist Chuck Loeb and pianist Andy LaVerne recorded in 1989 and released on the DMP label.

== Reception ==
Professional ratings
Review scores
Source	Rating
AllMusic	1.5/5 stars

Scott Yanow of AllMusic wrote that the album was "pleasant" but "lightweight", stating "All of the talented musicians are capable of producing a much more substantial recording."

== Track listing ==
All compositions by Chuck Loeb except where noted.

1. "Book & Beads" – 4:55
2. "Circadian Rhythm" (Andy LaVerne) – 4:57
3. "Groovin'" (Felix Cavaliere, Eddie Brigati) – 4:38
4. "Far" – 4:55
5. "Sueños" (Andy LaVerne, Carmen Cuesta) – 4:46
6. "23rd & 15th" – 4:32
7. "The Mission" – 4:59
8. "Europa" (LaVerne) – 4:33
9. "Magic Fingers" (LaVerne, Loeb) – 4:36
10. "Maybe..." – 7:02
11. "Chappaqua" (LaVerne) – 3:40

== Personnel ==
- Chuck Loeb – keyboards, guitars
- Andy LaVerne – acoustic piano
- Clifford Carter – synthesizers
- Will Lee – bass
- Dave Weckl – drums
- Steve Thornton – percussion
- Lygya Barreto – percussion (2, 4, 5)
- Carmen Cuesta – vocals

=== Production ===
- Chuck Loeb – producer
- Tom Jung – producer, recording
- Andy LaVerne – co-producer
- Troy Halderson – recording assistant
- Ron Finger – cover artwork
- Jim Henderson – design
- Dave King – photography
