= Wayan =

Wayan is a given name. Notable people with the name include:

- I Wayan Arka (born 1962), Indonesian-Balinese linguist, lecturer, scholar and researcher
- I Wayan Balawan (born 1972), known as Balawan, Indonesian guitarist and songwriter
- I Wayan Gangga Mudana (born 1981), Indonesian footballer
- I Wayan Gobiah (born 1898), Balinese teacher and writer
- I Wayan Koster (born 1962), Indonesian politician and economist, governor of Bali
- Wayan Limbak (1897–2003), Indonesian dancer who worked with Walter Spies
- Wayan Palmieri (born 1977), American music video director, film editor and photographer
- I Wayan Suweca (born 1950), performer of Balinese gamelan
- Wayan Yudane (born 1963), gangsa player, exponent of Balinese music in New Zealand

== See also ==
- Kapten I Wayan Dipta Stadium, multi-purpose stadium in Gianyar Regency, Bali, Indonesia
- Murder of Wayan Mirna Salihin, died in Abdi Waluyo Hospital after drinking a Vietnamese iced coffee
- Wayan, Idaho, small unincorporated community in Caribou County, Idaho, United States
- Wayan Fijian language, Oceanic language spoken in Fiji by about 57,000 people
- Wayan Formation, geological formation in Idaho
- Wayang
