= Jazz Piano Lineage =

Studio album by Andy Laverne
- Released: 1988
- Recorded: March 7, 1988
- Studio: DMP, Stamford, CT
- Genre: Jazz
- Length: 66:08
- Label: DMP; CD-463
- Producer: Andy LaVerne and Tom Jung

Andy LaVerne chronology
Andy LaVerne Plays the Music of Chick Corea (1986)	Jazz Piano Lineage (1988)	Frozen Music (1989)

Jazz Piano Lineage is a solo album by pianist Andy LaVerne recorded in 1988 and released on the DMP label.

== Reception ==
Professional ratings
Review scores
Source	Rating
AllMusic	4.5/5 stars

Scott Yanow of AllMusic stated "On this very interesting set, Andy Laverne performs solo versions of tunes by some of his favorite pianists ... Although quite respectful of the themes and the other pianists' styles, LaVerne's own musical personality comes through, and his interpretations are full of fresh ideas. Recommended".

== Track listing ==
1. "Pannonica" (Thelonious Monk) – 4:11
2. "In Your Own Sweet Way" (Dave Brubeck) – 5:25
3. "Water Lilies – #4 "Green Reflections"" (Richie Beirach) – 7:14
4. "The Sorcerer" (Herbie Hancock) – 5:11
5. "Waltz for Debby" (Bill Evans) – 4:44
6. "Passion Dance" (McCoy Tyner) – 5:01
7. "Children's Songs #11, 13, 16, 17 & 20" (Chick Corea) – 4:54
8. "T.T.T. (Twelve Tone Tune)" (Evans) – 5:35
9. "In Front" (Keith Jarrett) – 7:17
10. "The Brain" (Corea) – 4:39
11. "Men of Moses Who Wear Glasses" (Andy LaVerne) – 8:14
12. "Prelude #7" (Claude Debussy) – 3:37

== Personnel ==
- Andy LaVerne – piano
