= Captain Video =

Captain Video may refer to:

- Captain Video and His Video Rangers, a 1949–1995 American television series
- Captain Video (album), by Andy LaVerne, or the title track, 1981

People with the nickname:

- Tony Gwynn (1960–2014), American baseball player
- Roger Neilson (1934–2003), Canadian ice hockey coach
