= Liquid Silver =

Studio album by Andy LaVerne
- Released: 1984
- Recorded: October 30 & 31 and November 3, 1984
- Studio: A & R Recording and Clinton Studios, NYC
- Genre: Jazz
- Length: 70:34
- Label: DMP; CD-449
- Producer: Andy LaVerne and Tom Jung

Andy LaVerne chronology
Captain Video (1981)	Liquid Silver (1984)	Andy LaVerne Plays the Music of Chick Corea (1986)

Liquid Silver is an album by pianist Andy LaVerne recorded in 1984 (with one track from 1981) and released on the DMP label.

Professional ratings
Review scores
Source	Rating
AllMusic	4/5 stars

== Track listing ==
All compositions by Andy LaVerne except where noted.

1. "IRS (It's Really Something)" – 7:15
2. "Liquid Silver" – 5:58
3. "One Page Waltz" (John Abercrombie) – 5:16
4. "Laurie" (Bill Evans) – 8:59
5. "Letter to Evan" (Evans) – 7:05
6. "How My Heart Sings" (Earl Zindars) – 5:32
7. "Turn Out the Stars" (Evans) – 6:30
8. "Alpha Blue" – 6:20
9. "King's House One" – 17:20

== Personnel ==
- Andy LaVerne – piano, arranger
- Eddie Gómez – bass (tracks 1, 3, 4 & 6–8)
- Peter Erskine – drums (tracks 1, 3, 4 & 6–8)
- John Abercrombie – guitar (tracks 2, 3, 7 & 8)
- Essex String Quartet (tracks 5 & 9)
  - Sebu Sirinian, Jennifer Cowles – violin
  - Amy Dulsky – viola
  - Patricia Smith – cello
