= No smoking =

No smoking may refer to:

- Smoking ban
- No Smoking (1951 film), a Disney cartoon featuring Goofy
- No Smoking (1955 film), a British comedy film
- No Smoking (2007 film), an Indian psychological thriller directed by Anurag Kashyap and starring John Abraham
- "No Smoking" (Cow and Chicken episode), an episode of an American animated comedy television series
- No Smoking, one segment of the 1993 film Smoking/No Smoking directed by Alain Resnais
- The No Smoking Orchestra, a Serbian rock band
- Zabranjeno Pušenje, a Bosnian rock band whose name means "No Smoking"

== See also ==
- No symbol, which with a cigarette added becomes an international symbol for "no smoking"
- Nosmo King (disambiguation), a name used by several entertainment personalities which is based on the term "No smoking"
