= Orfield Laboratories =

Minneapolis building with one of the quietest rooms in the world

- Interactive map of the Orfield Laboratories area

General information
- Type: Research
- Location: Minneapolis
- Coordinates: 44.9570°N 93.2327°W
- Construction started: 1970

Orfield Laboratories is a Minneapolis multi-sensory design research laboratory consulting in architectural and product development and research. It was founded in 1971 by Steven J Orfield. Inside the building is an anechoic chamber that is one of the quietest places on earth, absorbing 99.9% of sound. The room attracts media attention and inspires rumors and speculation about the psychological effects of spending time in silence.

== Building ==
The building, located in the Seward neighborhood of Minneapolis, was built in 1970 and originally served as a recording studio called Sound 80. It hosted musicians like Bob Dylan and Prince, and it's where the 1980 single Funkytown was recorded. It was also where the St. Paul Chamber Orchestra won the first classical digital Grammy award for their recording of Appalachian Springs. Starting in 1975, Sound 80 became a client of Orfield Labs, who provided design services in acoustics and lighting. In 1990, Steven J Orfield bought the building with the intention of using it for his company's design research and testing. In 1994, he completed a building addition for his acoustical laboratory and he moved his anechoic chamber out of storage and installed it in the building.

The building is windowless, except in the offices, with hallways and isolated rooms of varying sizes.

== Anechoic chamber ==
Orfield purchased the anechoic chamber in the 1980s when Sunbeam closed its Chicago facilities. He paid University of Chicago football team members to disassemble the chamber and load it onto three semi-trucks. He kept it in a storage warehouse before moving it to the Orfield Laboratories building in 1994. Orfield told The New York Times that product design workers have used the chamber to improve the sounds of consumer products including Sleep Number mattresses and Whirlpool dishwashers.

The chamber is a six-sided steel double-walled box. It is suspended by springs inside a five-sided steel-over chamber. Those two rooms are inside the acoustical laboratory, which has 12-inch thick concrete walls. The door to the anechoic chamber is made of steel panels covered in acoustical wedges of fiberglass, which also line the interior of the chamber.

Inside the room, people report hearing the sound of their own blood and other bodily function. The Star Tribune wrote that visitors felt as though the chamber had "reset their brains."

== Publicity ==
For five years, Orfield offered Friday afternoon tours to anyone who donated $20 to a local food shelf. But once the site attracted international attention, he could not afford to dedicate so much time to free tours. As of August 2022, tours cost a minimum of $200 per person with a $400 minimum.

In 2022, rumors spread on TikTok and YouTube that there was a cash prize for spending a long time in the room. While no such competition existed, the Orfield company's website describes "The Orfield Challenge" in which people can pay $600 an hour to be in the chamber.

== Quietest place on earth ==
Orfield Labs held the 2005 and 2013 Guinness World Record for the quietest place on Earth. Microsoft’s anechoic chamber in Redmond, Washington eventually beat Orfield. Orfield retook the record in November 2021 with a sound level of (-)24.9 dbA.
