= Sound 80 =

Recording studio in Minneapolis, founded 1969

Coordinates: 44°58′25″N 93°16′12″W

- Type: Recording studio
- Industry: Music
- Founded: 1969; 57 years ago
- Founder: Tom Jung and Herb Pilhofer
- Headquarters: Minneapolis, Minnesota
- Website: sound80.com https://www.orfieldlabs.com/

Sound 80 is a recording studio in Minneapolis, Minnesota, United States founded by engineer Tom Jung and composer/musician Herb Pilhofer in 1969. Largely involved with local artists, the studio is best known for recording portions of Bob Dylan's Blood on the Tracks in 1974 and Cat Stevens' Izitso in 1977, as well as demo tapes for Prince's first album For You in 1977.

In 1978, Sound 80 made the first digital audio recording to win a Grammy Award—The Saint Paul Chamber Orchestra's recording of Aaron Copland's "Appalachian Spring" and "Short Symphony", and Charles Ives' "Symphony No. 3".

In 2020, Sound 80 was placed on the National Register of Historic Places.

== History ==
Jung and Pilhofer had previously worked at the Kay Bank Studios in Minneapolis, where artists such as Dave Dudley and The Trashmen had recorded. The Sound 80 name came from advertising man Brad Morrison, who had previously named Hormel's Cure 81 ham product (supposedly while drinking Vat 69 Scotch). "The number didn't mean a thing," Pilhofer later explained. "Eighty-one was already taken [by Hormel]. Eighty just sounded right and it looked good."

3M, based in neighboring Saint Paul, Minnesota, brought in a prototype digital recording system in the late Spring of 1978. Nicknamed "Herbie" after Herb Pilhofer, the system was used for two recordings by the Saint Paul Chamber Orchestra and one for jazz group Flim and the BB's. One of the SPCO albums won the Grammy Award for Best Chamber Orchestra Recording in 1979. Being a prototype, it was a very bulky and finicky system. For example, it used wire wrap boards and few, if any, soldered connections. When it worked, the system had a number of good qualities. However, there was no editing ability for digital media at the time, so even minor flaws would require the whole track to be re-recorded.

Tom Jung left the company to work in New York City, but created a mobile recording unit known as Road 80, which was rented to Sound 80 studios on occasion. Jung later created the company DMP Digital Music Products, which also pushed the envelope of later digital audio technology (the company recorded the first multi-channel Super Audio CD).

In the mid-1980s the building became the home to AVC Systems, one of the largest pro audio contractors in the midwest. The basement, including the live echo chamber, was converted into a staging area for system fabrication. The main studio was converted to a showroom and office facilities. The smaller studio was rented by "Roger Dodger Music", a Minneapolis based keyboard/synthesizer dealer.

== Orfield Labs ==
The Sound 80 building was sold in 1990, but the original recording studios 1, 2 and 3 still exist, and the complex is now home to Orfield Laboratories (OL), the world's only independent multi sensory design research lab, who added a 3,500 square foot NIST/NVLAP Acoustical Lab to the complex. In this lab, OL operates the only NVlap accredited independent anechoic chamber in the U.S. At −13 dBA, it is listed as "the quietest place on Earth" by the Guinness Book of World Records for 2005 and 2013. In its acoustic lab, OL also has 3 NIST accredited reverberation chambers, for testing of sound transmission, sound absorption and sound power, as well as for research uses. Sound 80 also has the first Acoustic Lab Acoustic Camera for source localization research in any accredited American lab.

Sound 80 was listed in Guinness again in 2006 as the "Oldest Digital Recording Studio in the World".

Orfield Laboratories consults in architecture in acoustics, AV, daylighting, lighting, thermal comfort, indoor air quality, human factors and forensics. OL has completed commercial buildings of most types across the United States. OL consults in product development in sound quality, visual quality, thermal quality, usability quality and tests products acoustically, vibrationally, photometrically and thermally. Clients have included Harley Davidson, Whirlpool, Cessna Aircraft, Maytag, Kohler, JI Case, Herman Miller, Steelcase, Haworth, Microsoft and many others.

== Recording artists ==
Artists who recorded at the studio include:

- Bob Dylan
- Dave Brubeck (1978)
- Debbie Friedman
- Flamin' Ohs
- Flim & the BB's
- Michael Johnson
- Leo Kottke
- Lazarus
- Lipps Inc., Funkytown sessions 1980
- McDonald & Sherby (1969/1974)
- Prince, demos (1977)
- Saint Paul Chamber Orchestra
- Skogie and the Flaming Pachucos, (1972)
- Skogie, (1973)
- Cat Stevens (1976)
- The Suburbs
- Suicide Commandos, Make a Record
- Don Voegeli
- Willie and the Bees (1980)
- Yanni (1980)
- Straight [ 1975 ]
