= Released (Jade Warrior album) =

Studio album by Jade Warrior
- Released: November 1971
- Recorded: 1971, Nova Sound, London
- Genre: Progressive rock
- Length: 46:13
- Label: Vertigo
- Producer: Jade Warrior

Jade Warrior chronology
Jade Warrior (1971)	Released (1971)	Last Autumn's Dream (1972)

Released is the second studio album by British band Jade Warrior. It follows a progressive rock trend rather than the ultimately ethnic and world music sound of their previous album.

From the "Jade Warriors" web site:

Jade Warriors second album is a study in contrasts. Powerful, straight forward rock compositions such as 'Three-Horned Dragon King' and 'We Have Reason To Believe' have been paired with gentle ballads of 'Bride Of Summer' and 'Yellow Eyes' along with the jazzy instrumentals 'Water Curtain Cave' and the extended brass-enriched jam 'Barazinbar'.

== Track listing ==
All tracks written by Tony Duhig, Jon Field, and Glyn Havard.

1. "Three-Horned Dragon King" - 6:14
2. "Eyes on You" - 3:09
3. "Bride of Summer" - 3:21
4. "Water Curtain Cave" - 6:29
5. "Minnamoto's Dream" - 5:22
6. "We Have Reason to Believe" - 3:50
7. "Barazinbar" - 14:47
8. "Yellow Eyes" - 2:56

== Personnel ==
- Jon Field - flutes, percussion
- Tony Duhig - guitars
- Glyn Havard - bass, vocals
- Allan Price - drums
- Dave Conners - tenor and alto saxes
