= Last Autumn's Dream (album) =

Studio album by Jade Warrior
- Released: 1972
- Studio: Nova Sound Studios; London, England
- Genre: Progressive rock
- Length: 38:20
- Label: Vertigo
- Producer: Jade Warrior

Jade Warrior chronology
Released (1971)	Last Autumn's Dream (1972)	Floating World (1974)

Professional ratings
Review scores
Source	Rating
AllMusic	3/5 stars

Last Autumn's Dream is the third studio album by British band Jade Warrior. The album, released in 1972, yielded two singles, "A Winter's Tale" and "The Demon Trucker".

Last Autumn's Dream was Jade Warrior's first album to feature Tony Duhig's brother, David Duhig, who co-wrote "The Demon Trucker" with the band, as well as playing guitar on the track. David returned for the next two studio albums, and then again in 1984 (Horizen) and 1998 (Eclipse and Fifth Element).

== Track listing ==
All tracks written by Jade Warrior, except where noted.

1. "A Winter's Tale" - 5:06
2. "Snake" - 2:55
3. "Dark River" - 6:26
4. "Joanne" - 2:50
5. "Obedience" - 3:12
6. "Morning Hymn" - 3:36
7. "May Queen" - 5:22
8. "The Demon Trucker" - 2:34 (Jade Warrior, David Duhig)
9. "Lady of the Lake" - 3:17
10. "Borne on the Solar Wind" - 3:02

== Personnel ==
- Jon Field - flutes, percussion, piano, acoustic guitar
- Tony Duhig - electric guitars
- Glyn Havard - bass, acoustic guitars, vocals
- Allan Price - drums
- David Duhig - electric guitar on "The Demon Trucker", electric guitar solo on "Snake"
