= Natural Living =

Studio album by Andy Laverne and John Abercrombie
- Released: 1990
- Recorded: November 28–29, 1989
- Studio: Sound On Sound Studio, NYC
- Genre: Jazz
- Length: 70:43
- Label: Musidisc; 500092
- Producer: Denis Lacharme and François Lacharme

Andy LaVerne chronology
Magic Fingers (1989)	Natural Living (1990)	Severe Clear (1990)

John Abercrombie chronology
Animato (1989)	Natural Living (1989)	Nosmo King (1991)

Natural Living is an album by guitarist John Abercrombie and pianist Andy LaVerne recorded in 1989 and released on the French label, Musidisc.

== Reception ==
Professional ratings
Review scores
Source	Rating
AllMusic	4/5 stars

Ken Dryden of AllMusic stated, "This duo date marks the first occasion during which Andy LaVerne and John Abercrombie played together, so with the impressive results it isn't surprising to learn that they would get together again in the studio. The give and take between the pianist and guitarist is at the high level of the Bill Evans-Jim Hall sessions. ... This is an excellent all around release".

== Track listing ==
All compositions by Andy LaVerne except where noted.

1. "Sweet and Lovely" (Gus Arnheim, Jules LeMare, Harry Tobias) – 5:01
2. "Actual Sighs" – 6:03
3. "John's Waltz" (John Abercrombie) – 4:48
4. "All the Things You Are" (Jerome Kern, Oscar Hammerstein II) – 5:19
5. "Among Tall Trees" – 5:24
6. "Natural Living" – 8:20
7. "Archetypal Schemata" – 4:13
8. "Magnetic Flux" (Abercrombie, LaVerne) – 4:03
9. "Labour Day" (Abercrombie) – 5:19
10. "When You Wish upon a Star" (Leigh Harline, Ned Washington) – 7:32
11. "Stella by Starlight" (Victor Young, Washington) – 7:11
12. "Suzy's World" – 7:30

== Personnel ==
- Andy LaVerne – piano
- John Abercrombie – electric guitar, acoustic guitar, guitar synthesizer
