= Buy One Get One Free (album) =

Studio album by Andy Laverne Trio
- Released: 1993
- Recorded: April 1992
- Studio: SteepleChase Digital Studio
- Genre: Jazz
- Length: 62:05
- Label: SteepleChase; SCCD 31319
- Producer: Nils Winther

Andy LaVerne chronology
Now It Can Be Played (1992)	Buy One Get One Free (1993)	Double Standard (1993)

Buy One Get One Free is an album by pianist Andy LaVerne performing on two Yamaha Grand Pianos recorded in 1992 and released on the Danish label, SteepleChase.

== Reception ==
Professional ratings
Review scores
Source	Rating
AllMusic	3/5 stars
The Penguin Guide to Jazz	2.5/4 stars

Ken Dryden of AllMusic stated "LaVerne makes use of the full range of both keyboards combined for a richly textured arrangement. This is a very interesting experiment worth acquiring by fans of duo piano".

== Track listing ==
All compositions by Andy LaVerne except where noted.

1. "Pairs of Chairs" – 4:59
2. "Orbit (Unless It's You)" (Bill Evans) – 6:48
3. "Fine Tune" – 5:36
4. "Maiden Voyage" (Herbie Hancock) – 7:22
5. "Buy One, Get One Free" – 6:11
6. "By Myself" (Arthur Schwartz, Howard Dietz) – 7:22
7. "Elm" (Richie Beirach) – 6:17
8. "Invisible Denial" – 4:21
9. "Intervallic Denial" – 4:21
10. "Spain" (Chick Corea) – 7:27

== Personnel ==
- Andy LaVerne – Grand Pianos (Yamaha DC7F and Yamaha CF7), disklavier
