= Another World (Andy LaVerne album) =

Studio album by Andy Laverne Trio
- Released: 1977
- Recorded: September 9, 1977
- Studio: Copenhagen
- Genre: Jazz
- Length: 58:29
- Label: SteepleChase; SCS 1086
- Producer: Nils Winther

Andy Laverne chronology
Spirit of '76 (1976)	Another World (1977)	For Us (1978)

Another World is an album by pianist Andy LaVerne recorded in 1977 and released on the Danish label, SteepleChase.

== Reception ==
Professional ratings
Review scores
Source	Rating
AllMusic	3/5 stars

Ken Dryden of AllMusic states, "This trio date focuses exclusively on originals by this very underrated pianist, joined by bassist Mike Richmond and drummer Billy Hart. The intense and aptly named "Spiral" features some virtuoso playing by Richmond, as does the racehorse "Tall Boys." LaVerne's playing is especially notable on the dark ballad "Cream Puff" and the two takes of "Straight For Life"".

== Track listing ==
All compositions by Andy LaVerne

1. "Spiral" – 5:38
2. "Another World" – 3:56
3. "Tallboys" – 5:20
4. "Arizona" – 6:16
5. "Cream Puff" – 7:57
6. "Utah" – 5:35
7. "Straight for Life" – 6:08
8. "Fleur de Lys" – 1:41
9. "Arizona" [take 2] – 6:26 Bonus track on CD
10. "Straight for Life" [take 1] – 5:58 Bonus track on CD
11. "Another World" [take 1] – 3:28 Bonus track on CD

== Personnel ==
- Andy LaVerne – piano, synthesizer (#1)
- Mike Richmond – bass
- Billy Hart – drums
