= The Miracle of Bali =

British television series

The Miracle of Bali is a BBC series of cultural documentaries narrated by David Attenborough and first shown in 1969. The series comprises three programs about the culture of Bali. The complete series is available as a special feature on the DVD release of David Attenborough's 1975 series The Tribal Eye.

== Episodes ==
=== Episode 1. The Midday Sun ===
The first episode is a general introduction to Bali, its people and their varied arts, with the main focus on Peliatan village, its orchestra and dancers. It focuses first on the gamelan orchestra, before turning to the influence that Walter Spies has had on the younger generation of painters. It concludes with the training of new pre-puberty Legong dancers and their first performance.

=== Episode 2. Night ===
This episode covers the animistic rituals and festivals of Bali, officially Hindu, but with origins in ancient ceremonials practised long before Hinduism came to the island. It opens with the spirit possession of children, said to be the origin of the Legong dance; it continues with possession by pigs, horses and even pots; and concludes with the all-important Barong ritual. This episode includes historical footage of the 1963 eruption of Mount Agung.

=== Episode 3. Recital of Music ===
This episode is about music and dancing from the Balinese village of Peliatan, the separate items linked by an appropriately illustrative detail from Balinese paintings. It opens with a virtuoso instrumental from the gamelan orchestra; next is a dance choreographed in 1951, The Bee Sips Honey; the 3rd section presents snippets from 4 different ensembles; and it closes with the unforgettable Monkey Dance.
