= Severe Clear (album) =

Studio album by Andy Laverne
- Released: 1990
- Recorded: March 1990
- Genre: Jazz
- Length: 63:27
- Label: SteepleChase; SCS 1273
- Producer: Nils Winther

Andy LaVerne chronology
Natural Living (1989)	Severe Clear (1990)	Standard Eyes (1990)

Severe Clear is an album by pianist Andy LaVerne recorded in 1990 and released on the Danish label, SteepleChase.

== Reception ==
Professional ratings
Review scores
Source	Rating
AllMusic	4/5 stars
The Penguin Guide to Jazz Recordings	3.5/4 stars

Paul Kohler of AllMusic stated "this recording finds Laverne in top gear playing some of the most incredible chord voicings".

== Track listing ==
All compositions by Andy LaVerne.

1. "Severe Clear" – 7:23
2. "No Guts, No Glory" – 8:39
3. "Plasma Pool" – 9:10
4. "Fact or Fiction" – 6:13
5. "Rick's Trick" – 6:31
6. "Trajectory" – 7:59
7. "Three Times Twice" – 9:16
8. "Ethereal Spheres" – 8:20

== Personnel ==
- Andy LaVerne – piano
- Tim Hagans – trumpet
- Rick Margitza – tenor saxophone
- Steve LaSpina – bass
- Anton Fig – drums
