= Fountainhead (album) =

Studio album by Andy Laverne and Dave Samuels
- Released: 1990
- Recorded: June 28, 1989
- Genre: Jazz
- Length: 63:21
- Label: SteepleChase; SCS 1261
- Producer: Nils Winther

Andy LaVerne chronology
Frozen Music (1989)	Fountainhead (1990)	Magic Fingers (1989)

Fountainhead is an album by pianist Andy LaVerne recorded in 1989 and released on the Danish label, SteepleChase.

== Reception ==
Professional ratings
Review scores
Source	Rating
AllMusic	4/5 stars

Ken Dryden of AllMusic stated "Andy LaVerne has developed into a top-notch pianist, particularly during his tenure on Steeplechase. This duo date with Dave Samuels, who switches between vibes and marimba on this date, has the energy of Chick Corea's duets with Gary Burton".

== Track listing ==
All compositions by Andy LaVerne except where noted.

1. "All the Things You Are" (Jerome Kern, Oscar Hammerstein II) – 6:02
2. "Severe Clear" – 7:57
3. "ATB" – 4:41
4. "Come to Me" – 4:43
5. "My Asian Land" (Dave Samuels) – 5:09
6. "ECB" (Samuels) – 4:55
7. "Fountainhead" – 3:53
8. "Round Corners" (Samuels) – 7:13
9. "Summer Night" (Al Dubin, Harry Warren) – 6:54
10. "Waiting for You" (Samuels) – 3:15
11. "How Deep Is the Ocean?" (Irving Berlin) – 4:57

== Personnel ==
- Andy LaVerne – piano
- Dave Samuels – vibraphone, marimba
