= Andy LaVerne =

American jazz musician (born 1947)

Andy LaVerne (born December 4, 1947) is an American jazz pianist, composer, arranger, and educator.

== Education and musical career ==
Born in New York City, LaVerne studied at Juilliard School of Music, Berklee College, and the New England Conservatory, and took private lessons from jazz pianist Bill Evans. LaVerne has worked with Frank Sinatra, Stan Getz, Woody Herman, Dizzy Gillespie, Chick Corea, Lionel Hampton, Michael Brecker and Elvin Jones.

He has performed as a leader in more than 50 projects, including Intuition, as a duo with saxophonist Jerry Bergonzi (SteepleChase), and Epiphany (ClaveBop).

== Instruction ==
As a jazz educator, LaVerne has released a series of instructional videos, Guide to Modern Jazz Piano, Vols. 1 &, 2, and Jazz Piano Standards (Homespun Tapes), featuring the Yamaha Disklavier, as well as the video, In Concert (Homespun Tapes), with guitarist John Abercrombie.

He is the author of Handbook of Chord Substitutions, Tons of Runs (Ekay), Bill Evans Compositions 19 Solo Piano Arrangements, and is the pianist on The Chick Corea Play-Along Collection (Hal Leonard). The Music of Andy LaVerne (SteepleChase Publications) has been published. Countdown to Giant Steps (Aebersold Jazz) is a two-CD play-along companion book, of which LaVerne served as player/producer/writer, and Tunes You Thought You Knew (Aebersold Jazz) is a LaVerne play-along CD/book set. Secret of the Andes is collection of LaVerne originals published by Aebersold Jazz.

He is a frequent contributor (since 1986) to Keyboard magazine, and Piano Today magazine. His articles have also appeared in Down Beat, Jazz Improv, Piano Quarterly, Jazz and Keyboard Workshop, and JazzOne.

He is the recipient of five Jazz Fellowships from the National Endowment for the Arts and winner of the 2000 John Lennon Songwriting Contest for his tune "Shania". He has appeared at concerts, festivals, and clubs throughout the world, and has given clinics and master classes at universities, colleges, and conservatories worldwide. He has also toured and recorded with singer-songwriter Neil Sedaka. He is Professor of Jazz Piano at The Hartt School (University of Hartford), and on the faculty of the Aebersold Summer Jazz Workshops.

== Discography ==
=== As leader ===
| Year recorded | Title | Label | Notes |
|---|---|---|---|
| | Mythology | | |
| 1976 | Spirit of '76 | | With Jerry Bergonzi (sax), Bill Washer (guitar), Mike Richmond (bass), Jeff Brillinger (drums) |
| 1977 | Another World | SteepleChase | Trio, with Mike Richmond (bass), Billy Hart (drums) |
| 1978 | For Us | SteepleChase | Duo, with Mike Richmond (bass) |
| 1981 | Captain Video | Atlas | Trio, with Bob Magnusson (bass), Shelly Manne (drums) |
| 1984 | Liquid Silver | DMP | With Sebu Sirinian and Jennifer Cowles (violin), Amy Dulsky (viola), Patricia Smith (cello), John Abercrombie (guitar), Eddie Gomez (bass), Peter Erskine (drums) |
| 1981–86 | Andy LaVerne Plays the Music of Chick Corea | Jazzline | With Marc Johnson and Mark Egan (bass; separately), Danny Gottlieb (drums) |
| 1987 | True Colors | | Some tracks trio, with Marc Johnson (bass), Danny Gottlieb (drums); some tracks quartet, with Jerry Bergonzi (sax) added |
| 1988 | Jazz Piano Lineage | DMP | Solo piano |
| 1989 | Frozen Music | SteepleChase | Quartet, with Rick Margitza (tenor sax), Marc Johnson (bass), Danny Gottlieb (drums) |
| 1989 | Fountainhead | SteepleChase | Duo, with Dave Samuels (vibraphone) |
| 1989 | Magic Fingers | DMP | With Chuck Loeb (guitar, keyboards), Clifford Carter (synthesizer), Will Lee (bass), Dave Weckl (drums), Lygya Barreto and Steve Thornton (percussion), Carmen Cuesta (vocals) |
| 1989 | Natural Living | Musidisc | Duo, with John Abercrombie |
| 1990 | Severe Clear | SteepleChase | With Tim Hagans (trumpet), Rick Margitza (tenor sax), Steve LaSpina (bass), Anton Fig (drums) |
| 1990 | Standard Eyes | SteepleChase | Trio, with Steve LaSpina (bass), Anton Fig (drums) |
| 1991 | Pleasure Seekers | Triloka | With Bob Sheppard (soprano sax, tenor sax, clarinet, flute), John Patitucci (bass), Dave Weckl (drums) |
| 1991 | Nosmo King | SteepleChase | Duo, with John Abercrombie (guitar) |
| 1992 | Bill Evans...Person We Knew | SteepleChase | Duo, with Larry Schneider (tenor sax) |
| 1992 | Now It Can Be Played | SteepleChase | Quartet, with John Abercrombie (guitar), Steve LaSpina (bass), Jeff Hirschfield (drums) |
| 1992 | Buy One Get One Free | SteepleChase | Solo piano |
| 1993 | Double Standard | Triloka | With Billy Drewes (soprano sax, tenor sax), Steve LaSpina (bass), Greg Hutchinson (drums) |
| 1993 | Andy LaVerne at Maybeck | Concord Jazz | Solo piano; in concert |
| 1993 | Plays Bud Powell | SteepleChase | Solo piano |
| 1993 | Glass Ceiling | SteepleChase | Trio, with Steve LaSpina (bass), Anton Fig (drums) |
| 1993? | Universal Mind | SteepleChase | Duo, with Richie Beirach (piano) |
| 1993 | First Tango in New York | Musidisc | With Joe Lovano (soprano sax, tenor sax), Steve LaSpina (bass), Bill Stewart (drums) |
| 1993 | In the Mood for a Classic | SteepleChase | Solo piano |
| 1994? | Time Well Spent | | Trio, with George Mraz (bass), Al Foster (drums) |
| 1994? | Serenade to Silver | SteepleChase | Quintet, with Tim Hagans (trumpet), Rick Margitza (tenor sax), Steve LaSpina (bass), Billy Drummond (drums) |
| 1995? | Tadd's Delight | SteepleChase | Solo piano |
| 1996? | Bud's Beautiful | SteepleChase | Trio, with Peter Washington (bass), Billy Hart (drums) |
| 1996? | Where We Were | SteepleChase | Duo, with John Abercrombie; in concert |
| 1996? | Four Miles | | With Randy Brecker (trumpet), George Mraz (bass), Al Foster (drums) |
| 1997? | Stan Getz in Chappaqua | SteepleChase | With Don Braden (tenor sax), Dave Stryker (guitar), Steve LaSpina (bass), Danny Gottlieb (drums) |
| 1998? | Between Earth & Mars | SteepleChase | Trio, with Dave Samuels (vibraphone), Jay Anderson (bass) |
| 1998? | Another World, Another Time | SteepleChase | Quartet, with Tim Hagans (trumpet), Mike Richmond (bass), Billy Hart (drums) |
| 2000? | Time | | |
| 2000 | Pianissimo | SteepleChase | With Rich Perry (tenor sax), Jay Anderson (bass), Matt Wilson (drums) |
| 2001? | Know More | SteepleChase | Trio, with Jay Anderson (bass), Billy Hart (drums) |
| 2003 | Timeline | SteepleChase | Duo, with John Abercrombie (guitar) |
| 2004? | Epiphany | | |
| 2004? | Process of Illumination | | |
| 2004 | All Ways | SteepleChase | With Gary Versace (organ), Billy Drummond (drums) |
| 2005 | Time to Dream | SteepleChase | Solo piano |
| 2006? | Peace of Mind | | |
| 2006 | Intelligent Design | SteepleChase | Trio, with Gary Versace (organ), Danny Gottlieb (drums) |
| 2007? | At the Kitano Vol. 1 | SteepleChase | Trio, with Gary Versace (organ), Anthony Pinciotti (drums); in concert |
| 2010 | Live from New York | SteepleChase | Duo, with John Abercrombie; in concert |
| | I Have a Dream | SteepleChase | Trio, with Gary Versace (organ), Anthony Pinciotti (drums); in concert |
| | I Want to Hold Your Hand | SteepleChase | Trio, with Gary Versace (organ), Anthony Pinciotti (drums); in concert |
| 2012? | Three's Not a Crowd | SteepleChase | Trio, Mike Richmond (bass), Billy Hart (drums) |
| 2015 | Genesis | SteepleChase | Trio, with Mike Richmond (bass, cello), Jason Tiemann (drums) |
| 2016 | Faith | SteepleChase | Quartet, with Alex Sipiagin (trumpet, flugelhorn), Mike Richmond (bass, cello), Jason Tiemann (drums) |
| 2018 | Shangri-La | SteepleChase | Quintet, with Alex Sipiagin (trumpet, flugelhorn), Jerry Bergonzi (tenor sax), Mike Richmond (bass), Jason Tiemann (drums) |

=== As sideman ===
With Ted Curson

- Jubilant Power (Inner City, 1976)

With Stan Getz

- Another World (Columbia, 1977)
- Mort d'un Pourri (Melba, 1977)
- Children of the World (Columbia, 1979)
