= Atlas Records =

Atlas Records was a jazz record label. It was merged with Polydor Records into "Polydor/Atlas". In 1995, Polydor/Atlas became simply Polydor Records again.

== Discography ==
#	Artist	Album	Year
1001	Jack Sheldon	Angel Wings	80
1002	George Cables	Some of My Favourite Things	80
1003	Pete Jolly	Strike Up The Band	80
1004	Sonny Stitt	Groovin' High	80
1005	Milcho Leviev	What's New	80
1006	Phil Woods & Chris Swansen	Crazy Horse	79
1007	Sonny Stitt	Atlas Blues "Blow & Ballad"	80
1008	Ray Brown	Echoes From West	81
1009	Andy LaVerne	Captain Video	81
1010	George Cables	Whisper Not	81
1011	Armen Donelian	Stargazer	80
1012	Shelly Manne	Hollywood Jam	81
1013	Monty Alexander	Fingering	81
1014	Bobby Shew	You And The Night And The Music	81
1015	George Cables	Old Wine, New Bottle	82
1016	Lee Konitz	High Jingo	82
1017	Terry Gibbs	My Buddy	82
1018	Shelly Manne & Russ Freeman	One On One	82
1019	Don Thompson	Days Gone By	82
1020	Lew Tabackin	My Old Flame	82
1021	Monty Alexander	Look Up	82
1022	George Cables	Wonderful L.A.	82
1023	Art Pepper	Sideman	79,80,81,82
1024	Shorty Rogers	Re-Entry	83
1025	Candoli Brothers	Echo	82
1026	George Cables	Sleeping Bee	83
1027	Harry Edison	Blues For Lovers	83
1028	Herb Ellis	Sweet And Lovely	83
1029	Herb Ellis	When You're Smiling	83
1030	Bill Watrous & Carl Fontana	Bill Watrous & Carl Fontana	84
