= Now (Jade Warrior album) =

Studio album by Jade Warrior
- Released: 30 June 2008
- Genre: Progressive rock
- Length: 50:58
- Labels: WindWeaver, Repertoire
- Producer: Jade Warrior

Jade Warrior chronology
Distant Echoes (1993)	Now (2008)

Now is the fourteenth studio album by British band Jade Warrior. Released on 30 June 2008 on the WindWeaver label, it comes after a 15-year gap since their previous album, Distant Echoes.

== Track listing ==
All tracks written by Jade Warrior, except where noted.

1. "Fool and His Bride" - 7:36
2. "Journey" - 5:52 (Jade Warrior, Colin Henson)
3. "Lost Boys" - 7:05
4. "Tall Trees" - 3:56
5. "Floating Moon" - 2:18
6. "3am Meltdown" - 4:21
7. "True Love" - 5:47 (Jade Warrior, Tim Stone)
8. "Talisman" - 3:05
9. "Screaming Dreams" - 4:54
10. "Everything Must Pass" - 6:04

== Personnel ==
- Jon Field - flutes, percussion, keyboards
- Glyn Havard - vocals, additional guitar
- Dave Sturt - basses, percussion, keyboards

=== Guest musicians ===
- Tim Stone - guitars
- Jeff Davenport - drums
- Theo Travis - saxes
- Chris Ingham - piano
- Lottie Field - woodwinds
- Sam Ryde - piano
- Carol Bellingham - backing vocals
- Gowan Turnbull - saxes, contrabass clarinet
- Brian Imig - Remiclud
