= Andy LaVerne at Maybeck =

Live album by Andy LaVerne
- Released: 1993
- Recorded: April 18, 1993
- Venue: Maybeck Recital Hall, Berkeley, CA
- Genre: Jazz
- Length: 65:06
- Label: Concord Jazz; CCD-4577
- Producer: Nick Phillips and Carl Jefferson

Andy LaVerne chronology
Double Standard (1993)	Andy LaVerne at Maybeck (1993)	Farewell (1993)

Andy Laverne at Maybeck, subtitled Maybeck Recital Hall Series Volume 28 is a solo piano album by American pianist Andy LaVerne recorded at the Maybeck Recital Hall in 1993 and released on the Concord Jazz label. The album was the 28th of 42 piano recitals recorded at the hall and released on Concord.

== Reception ==
Professional ratings
Review scores
Source	Rating
AllMusic	4.5/5 stars
The Penguin Guide to Jazz	2.5/4 stars
The Virgin Encyclopedia of Jazz	4/5 stars

AllMusic reviewer Scott Yanow stated "Andy LaVerne, who is normally heard with trios, sounds surprisingly comfortable in the solo setting. His performances on this date are rhapsodic and occasionally wandering ... This is an interesting set of creative jazz". The authors of The Penguin Guide to Jazz Recordings described the album as "ponderous," and commented: "this is impressive pianism... but too often one longs for a more filigree touch." The Washington Post's Mike Joyce noted that the album "finds LaVerne thoughtfully exploring harmonic options," and commented: "LaVerne's deft orchestrations subtly freshen the standards without obscuring what made them classic in the first place."

== Track listing ==
1. "Yesterdays" (Jerome Kern, Otto Harbach) – 5:07
2. "I Loves You, Porgy" (George Gershwin, Ira Gershwin) – 9:03
3. "Sweet and Lovely" (Gus Arnheim, Jules LeMare, Harry Tobias) – 5:57
4. "Star Eyes" (Gene de Paul, Don Raye) – 6:06
5. "My Melancholy Baby" (Ernie Burnett, George Norton) – 4:15
6. "When You Wish Upon a Star" (Leigh Harline, Ned Washington) – 4:35
7. "Beautiful Love" Wayne King, Victor Young, Egbert Van Alstyne, Haven Gillespie) – 5:40
8. "Turn Out the Stars" (Bill Evans) – 5:23
9. "Moonlight in Vermont" (Karl Suessdorf, John Blackburn) – 6:36
10. "Impression for Piano" (Chick Corea) – 5:20
11. "Stan Getz in Chappaqua" (Andy LaVerne) – 7:04

== Personnel ==
- Andy LaVerne – piano
