= Nosmo King =

Nosmo King (derived from the phrase "no smoking") may refer to several entertainment personalities:

- Stage name of Vernon Watson (1885–1949), English variety artist, who used the name from the early 1930s to his death
- Alter ego of Paul Shannon (1909–1990), American radio announcer
- Stage name of Stephen Jameson (born 1949), who later led The Javells, a British Northern soul group
- Nosmo King (album), by John Abercrombie and Andy LaVerne
