= For Us =

Studio album by Mike Richmond & Andy Laverne
- Released: 1978
- Recorded: April 30, 1978
- Studio: Copenhagen, Denmark
- Genre: Jazz
- Length: 48:20
- Label: SteepleChase; SCS 1101
- Producer: Nils Winther

Andy Laverne chronology
Another World (1977)	For Us (1978)	Captain Video (1981)

Professional ratings
Review scores
Source	Rating
The Penguin Guide to Jazz Recordings	3/4 stars

For Us is an album by bassist Mike Richmond and pianist Andy LaVerne recorded in 1978 and released on the Danish label, SteepleChase.

== Track listing ==
All compositions by Mike Richmond except where noted.

1. "For Us" – 6:15
2. "Peace and Happiness" – 3:42
3. "Prism" (Andy LaVerne, Mike Richmond) – 4:12
4. "Skies" – 7:45
5. "Bolero" – 9:32
6. "Reflections" (LaVerne) – 7:29
7. "Air" – 6:10

== Personnel ==
- Mike Richmond – bass
- Andy LaVerne – piano
