= Mike Richmond (musician) =

American jazz musician (born 1948)

Mike Richmond (born February 26, 1948, in Philadelphia) is an American jazz bassist.

Richmond started on guitar then picked up bass in his early teens. He attended Temple University (1965–1970), studying with Edward Arian from the Philadelphia Orchestra. After lessons with Jimmy Garrison in the early 1970s he began performing with Chico Hamilton and Arnie Lawrence, also working with Stan Getz, Jack DeJohnette, Horace Silver, Joe Henderson, Lee Konitz, Hubert Laws, Franco Ambrosetti, Dannie Richmond, Gil Evans, Art Farmer, Woody Herman, and George Gruntz.

Starting in 1980, Richmond devoted time to learning the sitar, traveling to Madras, India and performing live with Ravi Shankar. He led Mingus Dynasty (replacing Mingus) from 1980 to 1985, and began teaching at New York University in 1988 (Teacher of the Year, 1991 & 1994).

Richmond won a Grammy Award for Miles & Quincy Live at Montreux. His book Modern Walking Bass Technique is used internationally.

His bassline on the Jack Dejohnette track 'Minya's the Mooch" was sampled in the song "Buggin' Out" by A Tribe Called Quest.

== Discography ==
=== As leader/co-leader ===
- For Us with Andy LaVerne (SteepleChase, 1978)
- Dream Waves (Inner City, 1978)
- Colours of a Dream (International Phonograph, 1980)
- Prayer for Peace (Moers, 1985)
- Basic Tendencies (Nomad, 1988)
- Light Blues (Polygram/Amadeo, 1988)
- On the Edge (SteepleChase, 1988)
- Dance for Andy (SteepleChase, 1989)
- New Blues (Nuba, 1993)
- Blue in Green (SteepleChase, 1994)
- The Pendulum (SteepleChase, 2016)
- Tones For Joan's Bones (SteepleChase, 2017)
- La vie en rose (SteepleChase], 2018)
- Bill's Hit Tunes (Ride Symbol, 2019)
- Turn Out The Stars (SteepleChase, 2022)

=== As a member ===
Mingus Big Band

- Mingus Sings (Sunnyside, 2015)

=== As sideman ===
With Franco Ambrosetti

- Close Encounter (Enja, 1979) with Bennie Wallace
- Heartbop (Enja, 1981)

With Jack DeJohnette

- Untitled (ECM, 1976)
- New Rags (ECM, 1977)

With Stan Getz

- Another World (Columbia, 1977)
- Academy of Jazz (Poljazz, 1978)
- Poetry in Jazz (Jazz File, 1977)
- Utopia (West Wind, 1977)
- The Best Of Stan Getz (Columbia, 1978)
- Academy Of Jazz-with Bob Brookmeyer (Poljazz, 1978)
- The Lyrical Stan Getz (Columbia, 1978)
- The Essential Stan Getz (Columbia, 1978)
- New Collection (Columbia, 1978)
- Ballads And Bossa Nova (CBS, 1977)
- This Is Jazz (Columbia, 1978)
- Jazzbuhne Berlin '78 (Repertoire, 1991)

With George Gruntz

- El Camino (TCB)
- Merryteria (TCB)
- Live at Jazzfest Berlin (TCB)
- First Prize (Enja, 1989)
- Serious Fun (Enja, 1990)
- Blues 'n Dues Et Cetera (Enja, 1991)
- Happening Now (Hat Art) with Joe Henderson, Lee Konitz and Kenny Wheeler
- GGCJB (MPS) with Elvin Jones
- Cosmopolitan Greetings (Migros) with Allen Ginsberg
- Beyond Another Wall: Live in China (TCB)
- Live 82 (Amiga Jazz)
- Mock-Lo-Motion (TCB, 1995)
- Sins 'N Wins 'N Funs (TCB)
- Expo Triangle (MGB)
- Global Excellence (TCB)

With Tom Harrell

- Aurora (Adamo, 1976)
- Mind's Ear (1978)

With Eric Kloss

- Now (Muse, 1978)
- Celebration (Muse, 1979)

With Ted Curson

- I Hear Mingus (Interplay, 1981)
- Round Midnight (Generation, 1983)

With Andy LaVerne

- Mythology (International Phonograph)
- The Spirit of '76 (Four Star, 1976)
- Another World (SteepleChase, 1977)
- Another World Another Time (SteepleChase, 1999)
- Three's Not a Crowd (SteepleChase, 2012)
- Genesis (SteepleChase, 2015)
- Faith (SteepleChase 2016)
- Shangri-La (SteepleChase, 2018)
- Rhapsody (SteepleChase, 2019)

With Arnie Lawrence

- Renewal (Palo Alto, 1982)
- Treasure Island (Dr. Jazz)

With Hubert Laws

- Say It With Silence (Columbia, 1978)
- A Hero Ain't Nothin' But a Sandwich [Soundtrack] (Columbia, 1978)
- My Time Will Come (Music Casters)

With Jim McNeely

- Winds of Change (SteepleChase, 1990)
- Rains Dance (SteepleChase)
- The Plot Thickens (Muse)
- East Side/West Side (Owl)

With Jackie Paris

- Jackie Paris (Audiophile, 1982)
- Nobody Else But Me (Audiophile, 1988)
- Lucky to Be Me (EmArcy, 1989)
- Love Songs (EmArcy, 1990)
- The Intimate Jackie Paris (Hudson, 2000)

With Bobby Paunetto

- Commit to Memory (Pathfinder, 1977)
- Composer in Public (RSVP Jazz, 1998)
- Reconstituted (RSVP Jazz, 1999)

With Dannie Richmond

- Ode to Mingus (Soul Note, 1979)
- Hand to Hand (Soul Note, 1980) with George Adams
- Gentleman's Agreement (Soul Note, 1983) with George Adams

With Larry Schneider

- Just Cole Porter (SteepleChase)
- Blind Date (SteepleChase)
- It Might As Well Be Spring (SteepleChase)

With Lauren Hooker

- Life Of The Music (MHR, 2010)
- All For You My Heart And Soul(MHR, 2015)

With Combo Nuvo

- Nouveau Sketches(CN, 2002)
- Far Far From Home(CN, 2010)
- Like I Said (CN, 2015)
- One World Suite (CN, 2018)

With Joshua Breakstone

- With The Wind And The Rain (Capri, 2013)
- 2nd Avenue (Capri 2015)
- 88 (Capri, 2016)

With Tom Varner

- Jazz French Horn (Soul Note, 1985)
- Covert Action (New Note, 1987)
- The Mystery of Compassion (Soul Note, 1992)

With others

- Bob Berg, New Birth (Xanadu, 1978)
- Jerry Bergonzi, I Ching Reading (Ram)
- Keith Copeland and Kenny Barron, On Target (Jazz Mania)
- Ted Curson, I Heard Mingus (Interplay, 1980)
- Miles Davis and Quincy Jones, Miles & Quincy Live at Montreux (Warner Bros., 1991)
- Buddy DeFranco, Borinquin (Sonet)
- Gil Evans, Synthetic Evans (Poljazz, 1976)
- Herb Geller, A Jazz Song Book (Enja, 1987)
- Chico Hamilton, Live at Montreux (Stax, 1973)
- Roland Hanna, Gershwin, Carmichael & Cats (CTI, 1982)
- Richie Havens, The American Game (Arista)
- Daniel Humair, Surrounded (Flat and Sharp, 1987)
- Vic Juris, Bleecker St. (Muse, 1981)
- Jimmy Knepper, 1st Place (BlackHawk, 1986)
- Lee Konitz, Round and Round (Columbia, 1957)
- Mingus Dynasty, Live at Montreux (Atlantic, 1980)
- Jeanfrançois Prins, All Around Town (TCB, 1997)
- Ravi Shankar, Jazzmine (Polydor)
- Ben Sidran, Life's a Lesson (Go Jazz)
- Marvin Stamm, Mystery Man (MusicMasters Jazz, 1993)
- Adam Unsworth, Balance (AC, 2015)
- John Vanore, Stolen Moments (Acoustical Concepts, 2016)
- John Stowell, Golden Delicious (Inner City, 1977)
- Toshiko Akiyoshi – Lew Tabackin Big Band, Salted Gingko Nuts (RCA Victor, 1979)
- Ingrid Sertso/Karl Berger/Don Cherry,Dance With It (Enja, 1983)
- Naná Vasconcelos, Asian Journal (Music of the World, 1981)
- Bennie Wallace, Sweeping Through the City (Enja, 1984)
- Bill Watrous, The Tiger of San Pedro (Columbia, 1975)
- Eliot Zigmund, Dark Street (Free Lance, 1994)
