= Live at Montmartre (Stan Getz album) =

Live album by Stan Getz Quartet featuring Niels-Henning Ørsted Pedersen
- Released: 1977
- Recorded: January 28, 29 & 30, 1977; Jazzhus Montmartre, Copenhagen, Denmark
- Genre: Jazz
- Length: 55:07
- Label: SteepleChase; SCS-1073/74
- Producer: Nils Winther

Stan Getz chronology
Moments in Time (1976)	Live at Montmartre (1977)	Another World (1977)

Live at Montmartre (also released as Stan's Party) is a live album by saxophonist Stan Getz which was recorded at the Jazzhus Montmartre in 1977 and released on the SteepleChase label.

== Reception ==
Professional ratings
Review scores
Source	Rating
AllMusic	4/5 stars
The Penguin Guide to Jazz Recordings	3/4 stars

The AllMusic review by Ken Dryden said that "All of the musicians are in top form throughout... This is an excellent outing that belongs in every Stan Getz fan's collection."

== Track listing ==
=== Disc One ===
1. "Morning Star" (Rodgers Grant) – 12:51
2. "Lady Sings the Blues" (Alec Wilder) – 7:59
3. "Cançao do Sol" (Milton Nascimento) – 8:46
4. "Lush Life" (Billy Strayhorn) – 4:43
5. "Stan's Blues" (Stan Getz) – 8:06
6. "La Fiesta" (Chick Corea) – 8:58 Bonus track on CD reissue

=== Disc Two ===
1. "Infant Eyes" (Wayne Shorter) – 6:37
2. "Lester Left Town" (Shorter) – 13:25
3. "Eiderdown" (Steve Swallow) – 12:26
4. "Blues for Dorte" (Getz) – 8:22
5. "Con Alma" (Dizzy Gillespie) – 18:16 Bonus track on CD reissue

== Personnel ==
- Stan Getz – tenor saxophone
- Joanne Brackeen – piano, electric piano
- Niels-Henning Ørsted Pedersen – bass
- Billy Hart – drums
