= Now It Can Be Played =

Studio album by John Abercrombie – Andy Laverne Quartet
- Released: 1993
- Recorded: April 1992
- Genre: Jazz
- Length: 66:47
- Label: SteepleChase; SCCD 31314
- Producer: Nils Winther

John Abercrombie chronology
Nosmo King (1991)	Now It Can Be Played (1993)	While We're Young (1992)

Andy LaVerne chronology
Bill Evans...Person We Knew (1992)	Now It Can Be Played (1992)	Buy One Get One Free (1992)

Now It Can Be Played is an album by guitarist John Abercrombie and pianist Andy LaVerne recorded in 1992 and released on the Danish label, SteepleChase.

== Reception ==
Professional ratings
Review scores
Source	Rating
AllMusic	4/5 stars
The Penguin Guide to Jazz Recordings	3.5/4 stars

Ken Dryden of AllMusic stated, "This is a fine date that is filled with many interesting twists".

== Track listing ==
All compositions by Andy LaVerne except where noted.

1. "Now It Can Be Played" – 7:44
2. "I Wish I Knew" (Harry Warren, Mack Gordon) – 8:27
3. "Shadow and Fog" – 8:30
4. "John's Waltz" (John Abercrombie) – 7:30
5. "Cat Nap" – 9:06
6. "Yesterdays" (Jerome Kern, Otto Harbach) – 8:05
7. "Labour Day" (Abercrombie) – 7:55
8. "Waltz King" – 9:09

== Personnel ==
- John Abercrombie – guitar
- Andy LaVerne – piano
- Steve LaSpina – bass
- Jeff Hirschfield – drums
