= Another World (Stan Getz album) =

Studio album by Stan Getz
- Released: 1978
- Recorded: September 13, 1977
- Studio: Mountain, Montreux, Switzerland
- Genre: Jazz
- Length: 75:26
- Label: Columbia; JG 35513
- Producer: Stan Getz, Monica Getz

Stan Getz chronology
Live at Montmartre (1977)	Another World (1978)	Mort d'un Pourri (1977)

Another World is an album by saxophonist Stan Getz, recorded in 1977 and released on the Columbia label as a double LP.

== Reception ==
Professional ratings
Review scores
Source	Rating
AllMusic	2.5/5 stars
The Rolling Stone Jazz Record Guide	3/5 stars

Newsday noted that Getz's "sound is more relaxed and yet more urgent than it's been on his other recent records."

The AllMusic review by Scott Yanow stated that "the music heard throughout this set is generally quite rewarding... The musicianship is high and Stan Getz was open to new challenges".

== Track listing ==
1. "Pretty City" (Andy LaVerne) - 10:25
2. "Keep Dreaming" (LaVerne) - 7:49
3. "Sabra" (LaVerne) - 9:34
4. "Anna" (Mike Richmond) - 3:06
5. "Another World" (Stan Getz) - 6:10
6. "Sum Sum" (Richmond) - 7:06
7. "Willow Weep for Me" (Ann Ronell) - 11:21
8. "Blue Serge" (Mercer Ellington) - 3:38
9. "Brave Little Pernille" (Richmond) - 7:15
10. "Club 7 and Other Wild Places" (Richmond) - 9:02

== Personnel ==
- Stan Getz – tenor saxophone
- Andy LaVerne – piano, electric piano, ARP String Ensemble, minimoog, harpsichord
- Mike Richmond – bass, electric bass
- Billy Hart – drums
- Efrain Toro – percussion
