= Flim & the BB's =

Jazz band

- Flim & the BB's (1990)

Background information
- Origin: Minneapolis, Minnesota, U.S.
- Genres: Jazz
- Years active: 1978–1992
- Labels: DMP, Warner Bros.
- Past members: Jimmy Johnson; Bill Berg; Billy Barber; Dick Oatts

Flim & the BB's was a contemporary jazz band that was among the first bands to record albums digitally.

== History ==
Flim and the BB's consisted of Jimmy Johnson, nicknamed Flim, on Alembic 5-string bass and the two BBs, Bill Berg on percussion and Billy Barber on piano, keyboard, and synthesizer, with their initials having a whimsical connotation of BB pellets. Woodwind-player Dick Oatts was a featured guest on their first album before becoming a full member of the band.

The band was a side project, as they worked as studio musicians for a living. Their early days in the late 1970s included studio work in Minneapolis and playing as a band at the Longhorn Bar. They became acquainted with Tom Jung, chief engineer at Sound 80 Studios in Minneapolis. It was around this time that Minneapolis-based 3M began experimenting with digital recording, and Flim & the BB's were hired to provide music to test this new equipment at Jung's studio.

The group's self-titled debut album was recorded in 1978 at Sound 80 and was ostensibly going to be a direct to disc recording. Nevertheless, 3M placed an experimental prototype 50.4 kHz digital recorder in the control room as a backup to the direct-to-disc lathe. Because of the "direct-to-disc" setup (recording directly onto a lacquer platter) the band was required to play the entire LP side without stopping and without being able to do any editing afterward. When the resulting acetate disc was deemed inferior in sound quality to the digital master tape, the LP record was pressed from that digital backup tape, making it the second-ever U.S. commercially available digital recording. Since the machine used was a one-of-a-kind prototype, built before any digital recording standards were established—and dismantled within months—there is currently no way to reissue that first album on either LP or CD.

Flim and the BB's recorded its second album, Tricycle, for DMP Digital Music Products, an audiophile record label started by Tom Jung. The album was the first non-classical recording to be released in compact disc format. It was recorded on the Mitsubishi X-80 digital audio recorder at Sound 80. The disc displayed the full dynamic range available in CDs, becoming a popular test disc for this reason. It was also the first jazz album to be recorded, mastered, and delivered in the digital domain. The recording chain, after the first few feet of microphone cable from the musicians' instruments, remained in the digital domain until it was decoded by the consumer's CD player. DMP's releases were for the most part recorded directly to two-tracks as opposed to the more common multi-track method. This means that there was minimal use of overdubs and the majority of the music was performed, recorded, and mixed "live" to the digital recorder. The cover art for Tricycle was drawn by Bill Berg's son Jacob.

Flim & the BB's released four more albums for DMP, with each winning Digital Audio's "Jazz CD of the Year" award. After the release of The Further Adventures of Flim & The BB's they parted ways with DMP and signed to Warner Bros. Records. They released the album New Pants in 1990 and followed with This Is a Recording in 1992. Billy Barber composed the theme song for the TV soap opera All My Children. A version of the song appears on This Is a Recording. DMP released two of their albums, Tricycle and Big Notes, on limited edition Gold CDs, and Tricycle on Super Audio CD (SACD).

== Discography ==
=== Studio albums ===
- Flim & the BB's (Sound 80, 1978) (LP only)
- Tricycle (DMP, 1983) (CD, Gold CD and SACD)
- Tunnel (DMP, 1984) (CD)
- Big Notes (DMP, 1985) (CD and Gold CD))
- Neon (DMP, 1987) (CD)
- The Further Adventures of Flim & the BB's (DMP, 1988) (CD)
- New Pants (Warner Bros., 1990) (CD)
- This is a Recording (1992, Warner Bros., 1992) (CD)

=== Compilation albums ===
- Vintage BB's (DMP, 1991) (CD)
