= Bill Evans...Person We Knew =

Studio album by Larry Schneider & Andy LaVerne
- Released: 1992
- Recorded: March 29, 1992
- Studio: Studio Sofreson, Paris
- Genre: Jazz
- Length: 63:59
- Label: SteepleChase; SCCD 31307
- Producer: Nils Winther

Andy LaVerne chronology
Nosmo King (1991)	Bill Evans...Person We Knew (1992)	Now It Can Be Played (1992)

Bill Evans...Person We Knew is an album by saxophonist Larry Schneider and pianist Andy LaVerne performing compositions associated with Bill Evans recorded in 1992 and released on the Danish label, SteepleChase.

== Reception ==
Professional ratings
Review scores
Source	Rating
AllMusic	4.5/5 stars

Ken Dryden of AllMusic stated "The thought that went into the arrangements and song selections (as well as the consistently high level of playing) make this tribute to Evans an essential acquisition for anyone who is a fan of his many contributions to jazz".

== Track listing ==
All compositions by Bill Evans except where noted.

1. "Re: Person I Knew" – 4:51
2. "34 Skidoo" – 6:50
3. "Dream Gypsy" (Judith Veevers) – 8:44
4. "Orbit (Unless It's You)" – 5:37
5. "Time Remembered" – 6:48
6. "Show-Type Tune" – 7:20
7. "Detour Ahead" (Lou Carter, Herb Ellis, John Frigo) – 8:44
8. "Israel" (John Carisi) – 3:03
9. "Elsa" (Earl Zindars) – 6:05
10. "Funkallero" – 5:11
11. "Bill's Signature" – 0:19

== Personnel ==
- Larry Schneider – tenor saxophone
- Andy LaVerne – piano
