= Nosmo King (album) =

Studio album by John Abercrombie and Andy Laverne
- Released: 1992
- Recorded: December 1991
- Genre: Jazz
- Length: 72:11
- Label: SteepleChase; SCCD 31301
- Producer: Nils Winther

John Abercrombie chronology
| Natural Living (1989) | Nosmo King (1992) | Now It Can Be Played (1992) |

Andy LaVerne chronology
| Standard Eyes (1990) | Nosmo King (1991) | Bill Evans...Person We Knew (1992) |

Nosmo King is an album by guitarist John Abercrombie and pianist Andy LaVerne, recorded in late 1991 and released on the Danish label SteepleChase.

Professional ratings
Review scores
| Source | Rating |
|---|---|
| AllMusic | 2.5/5 stars |
| The Penguin Guide to Jazz Recordings | 3/4 stars |

== Track listing ==
1. "I Hear a Rhapsody" (George Fragos, Jack Baker, Dick Gasparre) – 6:35
2. "Waltz for Debby" (Bill Evans) – 6:13
3. "I Loves You, Porgy" (George Gershwin, Ira Gershwin) – 8:57
4. "Blue Cycle" (Andy LaVerne) – 8:57
5. "Silver's Serenade" (Horace Silver) – 6:24
6. "John's New Waltz" (John Abercrombie) – 5:35
7. "Babes w/Babies" (LaVerne) – 6:54
8. "My Man's Gone Now" (George Gershwin, DuBose Heyward) – 7:54
9. "Nosmo King" (LaVerne) – 5:47
10. "Never Never Land" (Jule Styne, Betty Comdenl, Adolph Green) – 7:45
11. "Softly, as in a Morning Sunrise" (Sigmund Romberg, Oscar Hammerstein II) – 6:03

== Personnel ==
- John Abercrombie – guitar
- Andy LaVerne – piano
