= Wayan Limbak =

Indonesian dancer

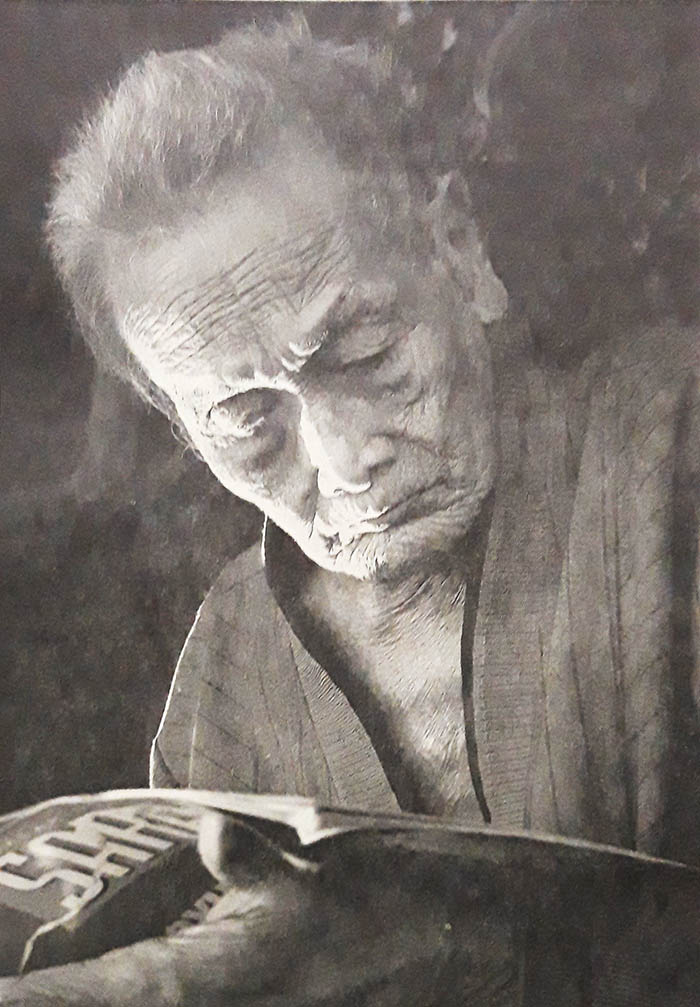
- Wayan Limbak in 1993
- Born: 1897; Bedulu, Bali, Dutch East Indies
- Died: September 5, 2003 (age 106); Bedulu, Bali, Indonesia
- Occupations: Dancer, Choreographer
- Years active: 1920s - 2003
- Known for: Creator of the Kecak Dance
- Notable work: Kecak dance
- Partner: Walter Spies (collaboration)

Wayan Limbak (1897/c 1910 – September 5, 2003) was an Indonesian dancer, who worked with Walter Spies to popularize the Indonesian dance, known as kecak.
