= Jade Warrior (album) =

Studio album by Jade Warrior
- Released: 1971
- Genres: Progressive rock, world music
- Length: 44:06
- Label: Vertigo
- Producer: Jade Warrior

Jade Warrior chronology
| Jade Warrior (1971) | Released (1971) |

Professional ratings
Review scores
| Source | Rating |
|---|---|
| AllMusic | 4/5 stars |

Jade Warrior is the debut self-titled and self-produced album by Jade Warrior, released in 1971 as part of the progressive rock movement. The album sets the scene for what the majority of the band's albums were to sound like, mixing various ethnic sounds with a progressive and otherworldly sound, as well as sudden changes between slow acoustic guitar melody, to distorted and heavy electric guitar with a faster tempo.

The album lacks drum kit backing, as the band was yet to include an exclusive drummer, and relied on Jon Field to provide the percussion with non-Western instruments.

== Track listing ==
All tracks written by Tony Duhig, Jon Field, and Glyn Havard.

1. "The Traveller" - 2:40
2. "A Prenormal Day at Brighton" - 2:45
3. "Masai Morning" - 6:43
4. "Windweaver" - 3:42
5. "Dragonfly Day" - 7:45
6. "Petunia" - 4:46
7. "Telephone Girl" - 4:54
8. "Psychiatric Sergeant" - 3:07
9. "Slow Ride" - 2:36
10. "Sundial Song" - 5:08

== Personnel ==
- Jon Field - flutes, percussion
- Tony Duhig - guitars
- Glyn Havard - bass, vocals
