= Standard Eyes (Andy LaVerne album) =

Studio album by Andy Laverne Trio
- Released: 1991
- Recorded: October 1990
- Genre: Jazz
- Length: 64:23
- Label: SteepleChase; SCS 1280
- Producer: Nils Winther

Andy LaVerne chronology
Severe Clear (1990)	Standard Eyes (1991)	Pleasure Seekers (1991)

Standard Eyes is an album by pianist Andy LaVerne recorded in 1990 and released on the Danish label, SteepleChase.

== Reception ==
Professional ratings
Review scores
Source	Rating
AllMusic	4/5 stars
The Penguin Guide to Jazz Recordings	3/4 stars

Ken Dryden of AllMusic stated "LaVerne is simply superb throughout, with a rather abstract samba arrangement of "Autumn Leaves" and a very lyrical, understated take of "Just One of Those Things." Recommended".

== Track listing ==
1. "Autumn Leaves" (Joseph Kosma, Jacques Prévert, Johnny Mercer) – 7:24
2. "When You Wish Upon a Star" (Leigh Harline, Ned Washington) – 7:01
3. "There'll Never Be Another You" (Harry Warren, Mack Gordon) – 7:01
4. "Just One of Those Things" (Cole Porter) – 7:28
5. "You're My Everything" (Warren, Mort Dixon, Joe Young) – 5:49
6. "Laura" (David Raksin, Johnny Mercer) – 6:24
7. "Stella by Starlight" (Victor Young, Washington) – 8:24
8. "Someday My Prince Will Come" (Frank Churchill, Larry Morey) – 5:42
9. "On Green Dolphin Street" (Bronisław Kaper, Washington) – 9:05

== Personnel ==
- Andy LaVerne – piano
- Steve LaSpina – bass
- Anton Fig – drums
