= Waves (Jade Warrior album) =

Studio album by Jade Warrior
- Released: April 1975
- Studios: The Manor Studios, Argonaut Studios
- Genres: Experimental rock, progressive rock
- Length: 44:35
- Label: Island
- Producers: Jon Field, Tony Duhig

Jade Warrior chronology
Floating World (1974)	Waves (1975)	Kites (1976)

Professional ratings
Review scores
Source	Rating
AllMusic	3/5 stars

Waves is the fifth studio album by British progressive/experimental rock band Jade Warrior released in 1975 by Island Records. The album, written, recorded and produced by Jon Field and Tony Duhig with guest musicians (Steve Winwood among them) consisted of one single composition which in the pre-CD days had to be divided into two parts to fit A and B sides.

== Style and concept ==
Jade Warrior's second of the four island albums was dedicated to "the last whale". It had no recurring theme and was marked by a slightly jazzier feel than its predecessor, carrying a listener "through dawn-lit countryside full of birdsong, downriver to the ocean, and out among the great whales". Describing the band's musical vision at the time as "increasingly exotic", AllMusic found the island albums "dreamlike, pushing a lighter jazz sound to the forefront", featuring "myriad percussive sounds but drum kits were rarely in evidence". "The band liked to create a soothing, ethereal feel, then shatter it with gongs and unexpectedly raucous electric guitar, usually from guest David Duhig, Tony's brother. The albums featured occasional celebrity guests such as Steve Winwood, but Jade Warrior had a style of its own", critic Casey Elston wrote.

== Track listing ==
All tracks are written by John Field and Tony Duhig.

No.	Title	Length
1.	"Waves Part I"	19:52
2.	"Waves Part II"	24:43

== Personnel ==
- Tony Duhig – guitars, percussion, keyboards, production
- Jon Field – flutes, guitar, percussion, production
- Dave Duhig – lead guitar
- Graham Morgan – drums
- Suzi – vocals
- Maggie Thomas – alto recorder
- Steve Winwood – keyboards, Moog synthesizer, piano
- Tom Newman – audio engineer, engineer
- Mick Glossop – audio engineer
- David Platt – liner notes
- Mark Powell – reissue producer
