= Captain Video (album) =

Studio album by Andy Laverne
- Released: 1981
- Recorded: February 11–12, 1981
- Studio: Stage & Sound. Hollywood. CA
- Genre: Jazz
- Length: 42:55
- Label: Atlas; LA27-1009
- Producer: Yasuyuki Ishihara

Andy LaVerne chronology
For Us (1978)	Captain Video (1981)	Liquid Silver (1984)

Captain Video is an album by pianist Andy LaVerne recorded in 1981 and released on the Japanese Atlas label.

== Reception ==
Professional ratings
Review scores
Source	Rating
AllMusic	4/5 stars

Ken Dryden of AllMusic stated: "This recommended, but unfortunately out of print LP, will be challenging to locate".

== Track listing ==
1. "Speak Low" (Kurt Weill, Ogden Nash) – 5:33
2. "Con Alma" (Dizzy Gillespie) – 5:03
3. "Duke Ellington's Sound of Love" (Charles Mingus) – 4:13
4. "There's a Boat Dat's Leavin Soon for New York" (George Gershwin, Ira Gershwin) – 6:36
5. "Captain Video" (Andy LaVerne) – 4:47
6. "Spring Is Here" (Richard Rodgers, Lorenz Hart) – 5:34
7. "How About You?" (Burton Lane, Ralph Freed) – 3:47
8. "You Go To My Head" (J. Fred Coots, Haven Gillespie) – 7:22

== Personnel ==
- Andy LaVerne – piano
- Bob Magnusson – bass
- Shelly Manne – drums
