= Floating World (Jade Warrior album) =

Studio album by Jade Warrior
- Released: 1974
- Genres: experimental rock, ambient, progressive rock
- Label: Island
- Producers: Jon Field, Tony Duhig

Jade Warrior chronology
Last Autumn's Dream (1972)	Floating World (1974)	Waves (1975)

Floating World is a concept album by the British experimental rock band Jade Warrior, released in 1974 by Island Records. The band's experiments with the sounds which would later be labelled as world and ambient music came parallel to that of Brian Eno, who described Floating World as an 'important album'.

== History ==
After the end of the 1972 American tour, the band's Vertigo contract was cancelled and Jade Warrior dissolved. Steve Winwood then urged Chris Blackwell of Island Records to give the band a hearing, and the latter proposed that Jon Field and Tony Duhig reform the band and sign a contract for three albums (later expanded to four) "as an ornament" to the label. Since Blackwell was interested in a primarily instrumental sound, the contract offered by Island was not extended to include Glyn Havard. Floating World was the first of these four releases that Field and Duhig made with miscellaneous guest musicians.

On some pieces – particularly the more introspective ("Waterfall", "Rainflower" and "Memories of a Distant Sea"), multi-instrumentalists Duhig and Field provided all the instrumentation. On other tracks, such as "Easty", "Mountain of Fruit and Flowers" and "Red Lotus", guest musicians were brought in for the drums, string bass, harp, lead guitar and female voice ("Quba").

== Style and concept ==
Professional ratings
Review scores
Source	Rating
AllMusic	4.5/5 stars
Classic Rock	5/10 stars

Floating World is a concept album structured around the Japanese philosophy of Ukiyo, the acceptance of life and its surroundings, living only for the moment ("..like a gourd floating along the river current.." to quote the album's liner notes). The sound of it has been described as "based on a unique combination of rock, jazz, classical and world influences, employing the extremities of dynamic range". AllMusic defines it as 'a complex set', noting that while "the compositions may be interlaced, ...the album itself is as diverse as any previous Jade offering".

Among its high points, critics mentioned "Monkey Chant", a "collision of the ancient traditional Balinese Kecac pitted against David Duhig's screaming rock guitar solo" has been mentioned, the opening "Clouds", juxtaposing 'an ethereal girls choir, tinkling wind chimes, glowing ambient passages, and incendiary guitar licks' and more aggressive "Red Lotus". According to AllMusic critic Jo-Ann Green, the "sheer diversity of sounds and moods, the constant clash or gentle intermingling of Eastern and Western styles, and the set's glittering atmospheres (make) Floating World an undeniable masterpiece".

== Track listing ==
All tracks are written by Jon Field and Tony Duhig, except where noted.

No.	Title	Length
1.	"Clouds"	2:52
2.	"Mountain of Fruit and Flowers"	3:16
3.	"Waterfall"	5:59
4.	"Red Lotus"	4:34
5.	"Clouds"	1:25
6.	"Rain Flower"	2:46
7.	"Easty"	5:26
8.	"Monkey Chant" (traditional)	2:22
9.	"Memories of a Distant Sea"	3:37
10.	"Quba" (Field, Duhig, Martha Mdenge)	4:13

== Personnel ==
- Tony Duhig – guitars, percussion
- Jon Field – flutes, percussion
- David Duhig – lead guitar on "Monkey Chant"
- Graham Deakin – drums on "Red Lotus"
- Martha Mdenge – vocals on "Quba"
