= Kites (album) =

Studio album by Jade Warrior
- Released: 1976
- Genres: Experimental rock, progressive rock
- Length: 36:27
- Label: Island
- Producers: Jon Field, Tony Duhig

Jade Warrior chronology
Waves (1975)	Kites (1976)	Way of the Sun (1978)

Kites is the sixth studio album by British progressive/experimental rock band Jade Warrior released in 1976 by Island Records. Kites, more layered and complex than Waves, the duo's previous outing, took nine months to record.

== Style ==
Kites presented the band "at their most musically abstract and progressive", featuring a larger number of guest musicians than any previous album. Each side here is a long concept piece: side A – Jon Field's side (partly inspired by abstract artist Paul Klee's painting "The Kingdom of the Air", otherwise meaning to convey the sounds of a kite drifting through skies), on side B, driven by Tony Duhig, the wandering Zen boat monk Teh Ch'eng in 9th century China provided a conceptual focus.

== Reception ==
Professional ratings
Review scores
Source	Rating
AllMusic	3/5 stars

Casey Elston of AllMusic described the result as "dense and dramatic" and a "rare example of intense ambient sound".

== Track listing ==
All tracks are written by Tony Duhig and Jon Field.

No.	Title	Length
1.	"Songs of the Forest"	3:12
2.	"Wind Song"	4:05
3.	"The Emperor"	1:58
4.	"Wind Borne"	6:52
5.	"Kite Song"	3:04
6.	"Land of the Warrior"	3:29
7.	"Quietly by the River Bank"	3:20
8.	"Arrival of the Emperor: What Does the Venerable Sir Do?"	1:06
9.	"Teh Ch'eng: Do You Understand This?"	2:32
10.	"Arrival of Chia Shan: Disclosure and Liberation"	4:10
11.	"Towards the Mountains"	2:03
12.	"The Last Question"	0:36

== Personnel ==
- Tony Duhig – guitars, percussion, keyboards, production
- Jon Field – flutes, guitar, percussion, production

=== Studio guests ===
- Roger Bryson – piano
- Fred Frith – violin
- Pete Gibson – brass, horn
- Coleridge Goode – bass guitar
- Debbie Hall – violin
- Jeff Westley – electric piano
- Graham Morgan – drums
- Joe O'Donnell – violin
- Clodagh Simonds – vocals
- Gowan Turnbull – saxophone
- Geoff Westley – piano
- Willie – drums, percussion
- Elmo – Mexican foot drums

=== Production ===
- Tom Newman – audio engineer, engineer
- David Platt – liner notes
- Mark Powell – reissue producer
- Paschal Byrne – digital remastering, remastering
- George Chkiantz – audio engineer, engineer
- Hugh Gilmour – package design
