= Andy LaVerne Plays the Music of Chick Corea =

Studio album by Andy LaVerne
- Released: 1986
- Recorded: 1986
- Studio: Sound Ideas Studios, NYC
- Genre: Jazz
- Length: 60:08
- Label: Jazzline; 11108
- Producer: Herb Wong and Andy LaVerne

Andy LaVerne chronology
Liquid Silver (1984)	Andy LaVerne Plays the Music of Chick Corea (1986)	Jazz Piano Lineage (1988)

Andy LaVerne Plays the Music of Chick Corea is an album by pianist Andy LaVerne recorded in 1986 (with one track from 1981) and released on the Jazzline label.

== Reception ==
Professional ratings
Review scores
Source	Rating
AllMusic	4/5 stars

Paul Kohler of AllMusic called it "A beautifully executed album".

== Track listing ==
All compositions by Chick Corea except where noted.

1. "Chick Corea" (Andy LaVerne) – 5:00
2. "Bill Evans" – 3:17
3. "Cornucopia" – 4:56
4. "Turnaround" – 5:45
5. "Folk Song" – 6:48
6. "Psalm" – 3:43
7. "Ghost of Triengen" – 4:51
8. "Softly as You Go" – 3:26
9. "Like This" – 4:15
10. "Romans (Written for John McLaughlin)" – 2:58
11. "Heart to Heart" (Chick Corea, Andy LaVerne) – 5:50
12. "You're Everything" – 4:56
13. "Blues for Liebestraum" – 3:30

== Personnel ==
- Andy LaVerne – Grand piano, synclavier, Hammond B3 organ
- John Abercrombie – electric guitar, acoustic guitar
- Marc Johnson – bass (tracks 1, 2, 5, 6, 12 & 13)
- Mark Egan – electric bass (tracks 3, 4 & 7–9)
- Danny Gottlieb – drums
- Chick Corea – Bösendorfer grand piano (track 11)
