= Frozen Music =

Album by Andy Laverne Quartet

Studio album by Andy Laverne Quartet
- Released: 1989
- Recorded: April 19, 1989
- Genre: Jazz
- Length: 63:21
- Label: SteepleChase; SCS 1244
- Producer: Nils Winther

Andy LaVerne chronology
Jazz Piano Lineage (1988)	Frozen Music (1989)	Fountainhead (1989)

Frozen Music is an album by pianist Andy LaVerne recorded in 1989 and released on the Danish label, SteepleChase.

== Reception ==
Professional ratings
Review scores
Source	Rating
AllMusic	4/5 stars

Ken Dryden of AllMusic called it a "very rewarding studio date" and "One in a long line of great CDs by Andy LaVerne for Steeplechase".

== Track listing ==
All compositions by Andy LaVerne

1. "Numero Uno" – 6:35
2. "Nitewriter" – 8:53
3. "It's Not My Problem" – 9:07
4. "North Country" – 7:12 Bonus track on CD
5. "Satan Doll" – 6:01 Bonus track on CD
6. "Decorative Trends" – 6:38
7. "The Bundo Credo" – 8:20
8. "Frozen Music" – 3:24
9. "Blue Cycle" – 7:06

== Personnel ==
- Andy LaVerne – piano
- Rick Margitza – tenor saxophone, soprano saxophone
- Marc Johnson – bass
- Danny Gottlieb – drums
