= Jade Warrior (band) =

British progressive rock band

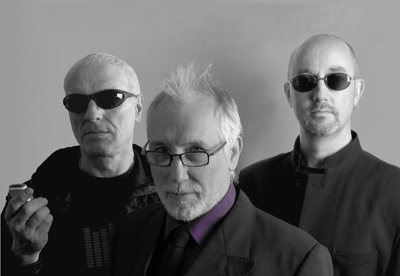
- Jade Warrior, left to right: Glyn Havard, Jon Field, Dave Sturt.

Background information
- Origin: United Kingdom
- Genres: Progressive rock, symphonic rock, world music
- Years active: 1970–2011 or 2014
- Labels: Vertigo; Island; Red Hot Records; Acme; Eclectic; WindWeaver Music
- Members: Jon Field; Glyn Havard; Dave Sturt
- Past members: Tony Duhig; Colin Henson
- Website: Jade Warrior

Jade Warrior were a British progressive rock band formed in 1970, originally evolving out of a band named July. The founder members were Tony Duhig (guitar) (born Anthony Christopher Duhig, 18 September 1941, Acton, London; died 11 November 1990, Somerset, England), Jon Field (flute, percussion, keyboards) (born John Frederick Field, 5 July 1940, Harrow, Middlesex) and Glyn Havard (vocals, bass) (born 15 February 1947, Nantyglo, Wales). David Duhig, the younger brother of Tony Duhig, played on several of Jade Warrior's albums and in every live gig Jade Warrior ever performed - apart from the reunion concert of 2008. He died on 1 December 2021.

== History ==
Jon Field and Tony Duhig met in the early 1960s when working in a factory (both driving forklifts). Soon they found common musical interests (jazz, African and Japanese music), started playing instruments (Jon a set of congas, Tony a guitar, which he tuned unconventionally to open C), bought a four-track tape recorder each and started experimenting with multi-layered overdubs. According to Field, the process was not unlike "...trying to build a cathedral with the sort of things you'd find in your back yard," but still, as it turned out, formed a blueprint for Jade Warrior's music throughout their career.

In 1965, the two formed a rhythm & blues outfit called Second Thoughts with Patrick Lyons on vocals, which released one four-song EP. Meanwhile, in a parallel line of development, Tom Newman (later the engineer for Mike Oldfield's Tubular Bells), Alan James, Pete Cook and Chris Jackson had formed the Tomcats. In 1965, both bands split up, Lyons joining Alex Spyropoulos in a (then) duo Nirvana, which released five LPs (with Jade Warrior members guesting on 1972's Local Anaesthetic). Reformed with a new line-up – Newman, James, Jackson, Jon Field and Tony Duhig – Tomcats spent 1965–1966 in Spain where they released four EPs to local acclaim (later Acme Records released them as a single LP, having included The Second Thoughts EP). In 1966, Tomcats returned to England, changed their name to July, and released their one only (eponymous) album, a psychedelic pop-rock collection. (Later it was re-issued as Second of July with some alternate versions and outtakes, and then as Dandelion Seeds with yet a different track list).

=== Jade Warrior ===
July disbanded in 1968, and Tony Duhig got a gig as guitarist in Unit 4 + 2, who, some years earlier had a UK number one with "Concrete and Clay". Already in the line-up were Glyn Havard, bass, and Allan Price, drums. The outfit was basically a pick-up band designed to tour the Northern British clubs and capitalise on the success of the aforementioned hit record. A month or two later, Duhig, Havard and Price travelled to Persia (later to become Iran) and worked in various nightclubs for three months, only to return to England practically destitute after a series of management mishaps. Before this, however, Duhig had introduced Havard to Jon Field, suggesting that he make a vocal contribution to Duhig and Field's own musical project. When Havard and Duhig returned from Persia, they and Field set about recording a series of demos that laid the foundation for the initial Jade Warrior albums. In the words of David Duhig, Tony's brother (and later a band member), "Tony met Glyn Havard and Allan Price, and they formed a band, which nobody really mentions because they went off to Persia to do some sort of money gig. I suppose the most notable thing about that is that Tony caught some sort of disease he called 'Persian Leg,' (Phlebitis!) which plagued him from there on in. That was around the end of '69." Field, Duhig, and Havard stuck together, and soon named themselves Jade Warrior after a certain dance drama ('The Phoenix and the Dove') Tony and Jon had composed for a London drama school. According to Havard, though, –

We all agreed that whatever we called ourselves would need to express the dualistic nature of our music – the 'soft/hard' quality if you like. Working along those lines, we sat down in Jon's living room and drew up two lists, one comprising words we identified with the quieter, meditative side of the band, and the other expressing the heavier, more menacing aspect. The hard list featured a more macho selection such as 'Spear' and, of course, 'Warrior'. Jon's first wife, Jenny, had made the suggestion that we might select our name from a choice of verbs rather than nouns, but after some deliberation, we ditched this idea as being too outre. In the end we decided on 'Jade', from the soft list, and 'Warrior' from the hard one. I guess had it gone differently, we might just as easily have been called something like 'Lotus Spear'.

Later a Red Hot Records press release stated that, "Jade Warrior was a Japanese term for a samurai warrior who was also a poet and scholar", but Havard expressed doubts as for the literal truth of this interpretation.

==== Vertigo years. 1970–1973 ====
In 1970, Jade Warrior signed a deal with Vertigo (their old band-mate Patrick Lyons, now Patrick Campbell-Lyons, had become a producer and a scout for this label), according to Havard, 'in a package' with Assagai, an Afro-rock band, with whom they shared the same management. Havard said, "They didn't want us, but they wanted Assagai because Afro-Rock, courtesy of Osibisa, was perceived to be the next best thing. Our production company, Mother Mistro, basically told them that if they wanted Assagai, then they'd have to take Jade Warrior as well". This (according to an official biography), "left Jade Warrior a contract with a record company, which had little actual interest in the band, and very little willingness to support or promote them." Their debut album, Jade Warrior, released in 1971, established their trademark sound of soft/loud contrasts, with Field's multi-layered flutes and percussion vying with Duhig's cutting guitar, and which incidentally outsold Assagai's offering (which featured a Jade Warrior track called "Telephone Girl").

This was followed in the same year by Released with appearances from Allan Price on drums, and guest saxophonist Dave Conners. Here Jade Warrior sharpened their rock edge ("Three Horned Dragon King", "Minnamato's Dream", the fifteen-minute rock jam "Barazinbar"), their quieter side represented by pieces like "Yellow Eyes" and "Bride of Summer". According to critic Peter Thelen, "where the first album featured an array of sonic possibilities, this is an album that highlighted the contrasts within that sound". "If Jade Warrior's second album has any overwhelming flaw, it is that its predecessor traveled so far off the conventional beaten tracks of early-'70s prog that anything less than absolute reinvention could only be regarded as a rerun of past glories", AllMusic argued years later. "…There is little here that Jade Warrior itself did not predict, but the unerring delivery of those predictions is a marvel in itself", critic Dave Thompson concluded.

In 1972, Last Autumn's Dream followed, both Price and David Duhig taking part in the procedures. The album, taking a step back to revisit "the wall-of-all-colors approach of their debut with a more surefooted and substantive instrumental approach," featured mysterious-sounding, introspective instrumental tunes ("Dark River", "Obedience", "Borne on the Solar Wind") juxtaposed with melodic pieces like "A Winter's Tale" and "May Queen" and harsh rockers ("Snake", "The Demon Trucker", "Joanne"). "One might sense in the overview that the band lost their way on the second album, and tried to put themselves back on track with the third", Peter Thelen argued. Nevertheless, as Dave Thompson put it, "For anybody just discovering Jade Warrior, Last Autumn's Dream is certainly the last of its truly essential albums". Taken as a whole, the first three albums saw the band creating and perfecting an innovative style, which (according to Dave Platt and Charles Wilkinson's biography) "had its base in rock music… with a Jethro Tull flavour, and significant admixtures of what we'd probably call 'world music' influence today". The band toured the US at the time (as the opening band for Dave Mason, Long John Baldry, and Earth Quake, and on one memorable occasion shared a two band bill with an unsigned REO Speedwagon. Around this time the band were filmed at the Marquee Club in London as part of a visual showcase for several acts represented by Gaff Masters management, including Rod Stewart and Long John Baldry. With enough material for another two albums, the band recorded all the tracks for Eclipse and Fifth Element during 1973. Vertigo, sensing an imminent change in an ever-fickle market decided against a release and cancelled the band's contract. This decision was partly influenced by the band having already parted company with their management. Despite this, Vertigo did release some of the tracks on various samplers. It was about this time, after an abortive tour of the Netherlands, that the band split up, and Glyn, Dave Duhig and Allan Price toyed with the idea of putting their own band together while Tony and Jon retreated to write.

==== Island years. 1974–1978 ====
In 1974, Steve Winwood (of Traffic) urged Chris Blackwell of Island Records to listen to Jade Warrior. He did so, and decided to sign Duhig and Field (who also provided flute on Mike Oldfield's Tubular Bells) as an instrumental act, which given the current success of Mike Oldfield's, "Tubular Bells" was seen by many people as a shrewd move. Duhig and Field were to create four albums on Island Records, with their sound expanded to include choirs, harp, and a string quartet. Guest musicians on these albums included Steve Winwood (keyboards), Fred Frith of Henry Cow (violin) and Dave Duhig.

First came Floating World (1974), a complex concept set themed around the Japanese philosophy of Ukiyo, with the songs revolving around two interrelated and interlaced series of compositions. According to AllMusic, "[The] sheer diversity of sounds and moods, the constant clash or gentle intermingling of Eastern and Western styles, and the set's glittering atmospheres made Floating World an undeniable masterpiece". The band's foray into what would later be labelled world and ambient music came parallel to that of Brian Eno, who described Floating World as an "important album".

It was followed by Waves (1975), another concept album dedicated to "...the last whale" and featuring Steve Winwood as a guest on piano and moog. The album consisted of a single composition, divided into two parts (each taking up an LP side); this, according to AllMusic, proved "a nightmare for radio programmers who might have provided Waves with the airplay it desperately needed to push Jade Warrior beyond cult status". 1976's Kites recorded with guest musicians, Fred Frith among them, presented the band at their most musically abstract and progressive, each side being essentially a long concept piece, inspired by Paul Klee's painting "The Kingdom of the Air" and 9th century China's wandering Zen master Teh Ch'eng. The last of the four Island albums, Way of the Sun, represented a spatial, cinematic sound journey to Latin America, described by AllMusic as an "incredibly vibrant set that quivers with emotion and life itself".

==== 1980–2007 ====
Personal issues, illness, and Duhig moving house to set up a recording studio, meant that the next album to be released was the 1979 compilation, Reflections, taken from their Vertigo years and containing some (at the time) unreleased tracks. It was not until 1984 that any new material emerged with the release of Horizen on Pulse Records, described as definitely a "Tony Duhig project": he wrote all of the music, while Field performed on only a few of the tracks being largely replaced by long-time woodwind ace Gowan Turnbull. In 1989, At Peace was released by Earthsounds label. This album, recorded at Tony Duhig's studio in only four days and performed solely by the duo, has been seen as the least typical of the Jade Warrior albums, close to ambient and even new-age music. Glyn Havard commented, "It was basically a cynical attempt to generate some cash in the "ambient" sector, as far as I can see, the album had no artistic value whatsoever ...."

This was followed by another long hiatus until Jade Warrior started their next project with new band members Colin Henson (guitar) and Dave Sturt (fretless bass). However, they were dealt a blow by the sudden death of Tony Duhig in 1990, before he could contribute to the album. The band decided to continue on with the album, which became the 1992 release Breathing the Storm on the Red Hot Records (re-released on CD by Voiceprint in 2001). This trio then released a follow-up album Distant Echoes in 1993, with guest appearances from Theo Travis of Gong (saxophone), David Cross of King Crimson (violin) and Tom Newman. It seemed for a while that Jade Warrior may have disbanded, as their only output was the previously mentioned Eclipse and Fifth Element, but these were then joined by the re-issue of all four Island albums in 2006.

In 2000, Glyn Havard and Allan Price joined David Duhig in a band named Dogstar Poets to release the Off-Planet (2002) In the summer of 2005, Havard officially rejoined Jade Warrior as a fourth member (alongside Field, Sturt and Henson). After about a year, Colin Henson withdrew from Jade Warrior, citing severe creative differences with the other band members.

==== 2008–present ====
On 30 June 2008, Jade Warrior as a trio released their fourteenth studio album NOW on the Repertoire label. It's been described as "a top-flight album boasting cinematic dynamics, thoughtful instrumentation, and the strategically astute placement of a roster of guest artists" (Record Collector), "as challenging as it is atmospheric" (Classic Rock), "the most mature and most deeply human album Jade Warrior has ever created" (FOJW) and "uber-cool, very well-produced, & well-executed album & one that... Tony Duhig would be very proud of" (Amazon review).

After a 35-year hiatus from stage, Jade Warrior played a one-off reunion concert on 23 October 2008. The show took place at Astoria 2 in London and featured Karnataka as the opening act. The setlist mixed songs from NOW with selections from their Vertigo albums.

In May 2010, news came that Jade Warrior was working on an instrumental album Haiku and the as yet untitled 'song album'. According for the April 2011 official website news entry, Haiku was "inching its way towards a conclusion", albeit slowly. It was expected to be released later in 2011. As of August 2025, neither album has been released.

== Discography ==
=== Albums ===
- Jade Warrior (Vertigo, 1971)
- Released (Vertigo, 1971)
- Last Autumn's Dream (Vertigo, 1972)
- Floating World (Island Records, 1974)
- Waves (Island Records, 1975)
- Kites (Island Records, 1976)
- Way of the Sun (Island Records, 1978)
- Horizen (Pulse Records, 1984)
- At Peace (Earthsounds, 1989)
- Breathing The Storm (Red Hot Records, 1992)
- Distant Echoes (Red Hot Records, 1993) also on Voiceprint 2000, released 2001
- Eclipse (Acme Records, 1998 - recorded 1973)
- Fifth Element (Hi-Note Music, 1998 - recorded 1973)
- Floating World, Waves, Kites, Way Of The Sun (Eclectic, 2006) also on Esoteric Records as separate CD albums in 2010.
- NOW (Repertoire Records, 2008)

All five albums recorded during the band's Vertigo era (Jade Warrior, Released, Last Autumn's Dream, Eclipse and Fifth Element) are currently available on the Repertoire label.

=== Compilation albums ===
- Reflections (Butt Records, 1979)
- Elements: An Island Anthology (Island Records, 1995)
- Breathing The Storm / Distant Echoes (Turning Point Music, 2003)
- Last Autumn's Dream / Floating World (Sunrise Records, 2005)
- Eclipse / Fifth Element (Esoteric Recordings, 2023)

=== Singles ===
- "A Pre-Normal Day at Brighton" / "Sundial Song" (Vertigo, 1971) (both tracks on the first album)
- "We Have Reason to Believe" / "Barazinbar" (Vertigo, 1971) (both tracks on the second album)
- "The Demon Trucker" / "A Winter's Tale" (Vertigo, 1972) (US and Canada) (both tracks on the third album)
- "The Demon Trucker" / "Snake" (Vertigo, 1972) (UK and Europe) (both tracks on the third album)

=== Film soundtracks ===
- Game for Vultures (1979)
- Bad Man's River (1972)
