= Digital Music Products =

DMP Digital Music Products
- Founded: 1983
- Founder: Tom Jung
- Distributor(s): Telarc
- Genre: Jazz
- Country of origin: U.S.
- Location: Stamford, Connecticut

DMP Digital Music Products was one of the first digital recording labels, generally specializing in jazz artists. DMP was founded in 1983 by engineer Tom Jung after he left Sound 80 recording studios in Minneapolis, Minnesota.

The label's first releases in 1983 featured pianist Warren Bernhardt, Jay Leonhart, and the group Flim & the BB's. These were among the first non-classical recordings released on compact disc. DMP was one of the few labels to release commercial DAT recordings, was at the forefront of introducing numerous digital recording technologies, and was a pioneer in the Super Audio CD (SACD) digital audio format. DMP issued the first multichannel SACD, Sacred Feast.

Notable artists who recorded for DMP include Lynne Arriale, Joe Beck, Warren Bernhardt, Flim & the BB's, Jay Leonhart, Chuck Loeb, Thom Rotella Band, Bob Mintzer, Joe Morello, and Ali Ryerson.

== History ==
An audio engineer, Tom Jung co-founded the recording studio Sound 80 in Minneapolis in 1969. By 1977, the studio was making digital recordings with a prototype of a recorder from 3M. Jung was attracted to digital recording in part by the desire to reduce the noise created by recording in analog. Digital could eliminate wow and flutter. In 1979, he got a job offer and moved with his family to New York City. He worked as a freelance engineer, recording albums, commercials, and soundtracks. Some of the musicians he encountered wound up on the roster of DMP.

- 1983 – Flim & the BB's Tricycle (CD-443) is the first jazz compact disc available to consumers. The dynamic music together with a live-to-2 track digital recording made Tricycle a global demonstration disc that would win CD of the Year honors in CD Review magazine.
- 1987 – DMP utilizes high-end recording technology from Cello on two breakthrough recordings by Warren Bernhardt (Hands On, CD-457) and Flim & the BBs (Neon, CD-458)
- 1989 – DMP's mascot, a black cat, is photographed for A Taste of DMP, (CD-466) cover and would soon become a cult figure.
- 1991 – DMP is first to utilize 20-bit recording and conversion technology on Chuck Loeb's recording Balance, (CD-484).
- 1995 – DMP implements a compatible surround sound technology in its DMP Big Band Tribute series, Carved in Stone (CD-512), The Glenn Miller Project (CD-519), and Salutes Duke Ellington (CD-520).
- 1996 – Big Band Trane (CD-515) is the 10th consecutive recording by the Bob Mintzer Big Band for DMP
- 1997 – Alto (CD-521) by Joe Beck & Ali Ryerson is the first commercial recording captured with Sony's DSD recording technology which samples music at 2.8224 MHz (64 x the 44.1 kHz compact disc).
- 1998 – Just Jobim (CD-524) by Manfredo Fest is the first project captured with the new Meitner DSD conversion technology
- 2000 – DMP releases world's first multichannel SACD, Gaudeamus: Sacred Feast (SACD-09)
