= Wolfgang Reisinger =

Austrian jazz percussion player (1955–2022)

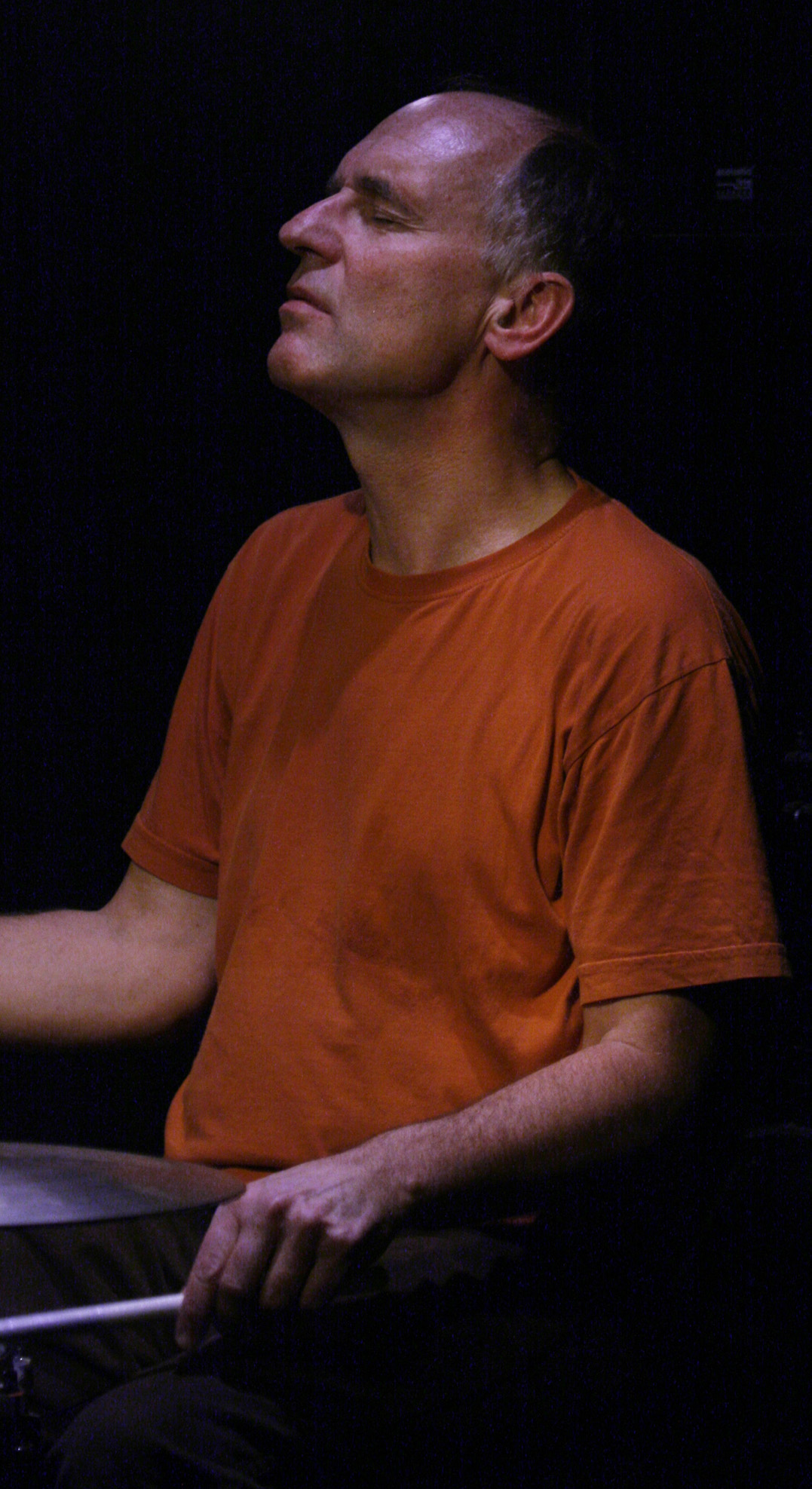
- Reisinger in 2008

Background information
- Born: 16 July 1955; Vienna, Austria
- Died: 8 June 2022 (aged 66)
- Genres: Jazz, classical music, free improvisation
- Occupations: Musician
- Instruments: Percussion
- Labels: Label Bleu, EmArcy, Extraplatte
- Website: wolfgang-reisinger.com

Wolfgang Reisinger (16 July 1955 – 8 June 2022) was an Austrian jazz percussion player.

== Biography ==
Reisinger started his education in music at Vienna Boys' Choir at the age of 5. Then, he studied piano at the Music and Arts University of the City of Vienna and percussion at the University of Music and Performing Arts in the same city under Richard Hochrainer. In 1973, he became a member of the experimental group Erster Wiener Musikzirkus, which made music for dance performances. Since the middle of 70s, he has worked with the composer Thomas Pernes. From 1975 to 1977, Reisinger was a member of the trio Medaya (with Voja Brkovitc, the guitarist and Beat Furrer, the pianist). As a member of the trio, he made tours all over Austria, Switzerland and Yugoslavia. In 1978, his work Hippodrome was published as a composition order for Burgtheater. In 1979, he played as a percussionist in the Vienna Art Orchestra and was its member until 1989. In 1981, he founded the group Part of Art. Other members of the group were Wolfgang Puschnig, Uli Scherer, Herbert Joos, Jürgen Wuchner and other soloists of Vienna Art Orchestra. He performed with Part of Art in Germany, Austria, Switzerland and France and recorded his first CDs as band leader. After a tour with Hans Koller, he founded the group Air Mail (with Harry Pepl), Wolfgang Puschnig and Mike Richmond. In 1986, he became a member of Wolfgang Mitterer's quartet Pat Brothers (with Linda Sharrock and Wolfgang Puschnig), the album of which Pat Brothers No. 1 was awarded the Preis der deutschen Schallplattenkritik. In 1987, he started to cooperate with London Symphony Orchestra. After leaving Vienna Art Orchestra, Reisinger became a member of the European Jazz Trio with François Couturier and Jean-Paul Cèléa in 1989. Besides, he worked in Paris with Dominique Pifarély, Yves Robert and Philippe Deschepper and performed in Moers Festival with Louis Sclavis. In the same year the album Matador was created in cooperation with Mitterer. As a member of the quintet Passagio (with Armand Angster, Françoise Kubler, François Couturier and Jean-Paul Céléa ), which was founded in 1990, he published the CDs Passagio and L'Ibere. In 1991, he performed in the first performance of Luciano Berio's Circles in Austria. Reisinger concentrated on Passagio in France in the middle of 90s. Between 1994 and 1996, he worked with musicians Like Enrico Rava, John Abercrombie, Evan Parker, Michel Godard, Herb Robertson and Peter Kowald.

In 1996, Reisinger founded the trio Céléa, Liebman, Reisinger. Their CD World View won the French critic prize Choc de la musique and their second CD, Missing a Page, won the prize Diapason d'Or. In 1999, he founded the group Spirits, which had variable members such as Karl Ritter, Peter Herbert, Andy Manndorff, Klaus Dickbauer, John Schröder and Franz Hanzinger. In 2000, Reisinger and Jean-Paul Céléa became the members of Joachim Kühn's new trio. In 2001, he wrote a theater music for K.l.a.s. performed in Burg Haimburg in Kärnten. In Kärnten, he founded the festival m.u.s.i.c, which was supposed to bring classical music, avantgarde, jazz and ethnic music together. Since 2002, he has played with Liebman in the duet Double Night. Since 2003, he has worked also with the composer Franz Koglmann. In 2004, he formed the group Refusion. The first album of the group with the same name was published in 2006. In 2009, he was awarded the Hans-Koller Prize.

Beside working as a jazz musician, Reisinger was also always active in the field of classical music and free improvisation. In the festival Töne und Gegentöne, he appeared on the scene with the Japanese Koto player, Kazue Sawai and also played in a duet with Agustí Fernández.

== Discography ==
- Moebius (Part of Art), 1981
- Son Sauvage (Part of Art), 1983
- Prayer for Peace (Air Mail), 1984
- Light Blues (Air Mail)
- Pat Brothers No. 1, 1986
- Passagio (Passagio), 1990
- L'Ibere (Passagio), 1994
- Matador, 1994
- World View (trio Céléa, Liebman, Reisinger), 1996
- Speakers Corner (with Franz Hauzinger and Martin Siewert), 1998
- Missing a Page (trio Céléa, Liebman, Reisinger), 1999
- Ghosts (trio Céléa, Liebman, Reisinger), 2001
- Refusion (Liebman, Marc Ducret, Matt Garrison, Céléa, Mitterer, Reisinger), 2006

=== As sideman ===
With Rabih Abou-Khalil

- Journey to the Centre of an Egg (Enja, 2005)
