= Tango from Obango =

Studio album by Wiener Art Orchestra
- Released: 1980
- Recorded: November 22 & 23, 1979
- Venue: Schmettersound Studio, Bisamberg, Austria
- Genre: Contemporary classical music, Jazz
- Length: 44:21
- Label: Art; Art 1002
- Producer: Hans Heinrich C. Stoller, Mathias Rüegg

Wiener Art Orchestra chronology
Tango from Obango (1980)	Concerto Piccolo (1981)

Tango from Obango is the debut album by European jazz group the Vienna Art Orchestra (credited as Wiener Art Orchester) which was first released in 1980 on the Art label. The album was re-released on CD in 1997 with additional material along with a sampler disc.

== Reception ==
Professional ratings
Review scores
Source	Rating
Allmusic	4.5/5 stars

The Allmusic review by Tom Schulte called it "an important document in the post-modern jazz movement".

== Track listing ==
All compositions by Mathias Rüegg

1. "Tango from Obango" – 13:24
2. "Polish Contrasts" – 9:36
3. "Voilà di Here" – 1:15
4. "The World of Beband & Bigbop" – 12:42
5. "Panta Rhei" – 5:53
6. "Charly's Trauma" – 0:38
7. "Aftercare by Wolfgang Puschnig" – 3:53 Additional track on CD reissue

Two Songs for a Lovely War Additional disc on 1997 CD reissue

1. "Song for Another Lovely War" – 15:59 recorded in 1988
2. "Another Song for Another Lovely War" – 14:39 recorded in 1988
3. "Jessas Na!" – 3:42 recorded in 1977 and originally released on 7 inch single
4. "Kontrapunkte" – 4:49 recorded in 1977 and originally released on 7 inch single

== Personnel ==
- Mathias Rüegg - arranger, conductor
- Lauren Newton - voice
- Karl Fian - trumpet
- Herbert Joos − flugelhorn, baritone horn
- Christian Radovan − trombone
- Wolfgang Puschnig − alto saxophone, flute
- Harry Sokal - tenor saxophone, soprano saxophone, flute
- Roman Schwaller − tenor saxophone
- Uli Scherer − piano
- Harry Pepl – guitar (track 4)
- Jürgen Wuchner − bass
- Werner Pirchner − marimba, vibraphone
- Fritz Ozmec − drums
- Wolfgang Reisinger − percussion
