= Adelhard Roidinger =

Austrian musician and graphic designer

Aderhard Roidinger
- Born: 28 November 1941 (age 84); Windischgarsten, Upper Austria; Austria
- Died: 22 April 2022 (aged 80) Vienna
- Genres: Jazz, classical
- Occupation: Musician
- Instruments: Double bass, bass guitar
- Website: adelhardroidinger.com

Adelhard Roidinger (28 November 1941 – 22 April 2022) was an Austrian jazz musician (bass, electronic), composer and computer graphic designer.

== Life and Works ==
Roidinger, who was from a musician family, learned first piano, violin and guitar. When he was 16, he started to play double bass. From 1960 to 1967, he studied architecture at the Graz University of Technology and studied simultaneously double bass and jazz composing at the University of Music and Performing Arts in this city.

Since 1969, Roidinger has played double bass with Joachim Kühn and Eje Thelin and afterwards with Karl Berger and from 1971 to 1975 in Hans Kollers Free Sound. He founded the European Jazz Consensus with Alan Skidmore, Gerd Dudek and Branislav Lala Kovačev. The 'European Jazz Consensus' recorded also the albums 'Four for Slavia' and Memory Rise. Then, the International Jazz Consensus was formed by him along with Kovačev, Allan Praskin and John D. Thomas. In Austria3, which made the core of his ECM album Shady side, he performed with Harry Pepl and Werner Pirchner. in addition, he worked also with Herbert Joos, Albert Mangelsdorff, Yosuke Yamashita, George Russell, Maria João, Anthony Braxton, Tone Janša and Melanie Bong. After additional education at IRCAM in Paris, his activity field of music reaches to performances with symphony orchestras and solo concerts with computer and visual components.

After working as a docent for Cybernetic Designing (TU Graz since 1967), Roidinger started to teach at Anton Bruckner Private University for Music, Drama, and Dance in Linz. He was the director of its jazz department since 1988 and moreover since 1994 the director of the Music and Media Technology department of the same university. He wrote lessons for double bass (1980) and bass guitar (1981) as well as a detailed publication about jazz improvisation and pentatonic scale (1984).

== Awards and honours ==
In 1988, he was awarded Ernst Koref Composition Prize for his computer composition Siamesic Sinfonia.
