= Féng =

- Feng surname in regular script
- Pronunciation: Féng (Pinyin); Pâng, Hōng (Pe̍h-ōe-jī)
- Language: Chinese, Vietnamese

Origin
- Language: Old Chinese
- Origin: Chang'an, Shaanxi, China
- Derivation: Duke Gao of Bi (畢公高)

Other names
- Variant forms: Ma (Mandarin); Feng (Mandarin); Fung, Foong (Hong Kong); Fong (Macao); Pang, Phang (Hokkien, Teochew); Phùng (Vietnam); Pangestu(Indonesia) 풍 (Korea)
- See also: Ma

Féng (simplified Chinese: 冯; traditional Chinese: 馮) is a Chinese surname. It is 9th in the Song dynasty Hundred Family Surname poem and is reported as the 31st most common Chinese last name in 2006. Unlike the less common Feng surname 鳳 ("phoenix" fourth tone) it is a rising second tone féng in modern Mandarin Chinese.

The character itself, is made up of the character for "Horse" with an ice radical consisting of two strokes to the left that is meant to suggest speed or galloping.

== Historical roots ==
The surname descended from the 15th son of King Wen of Zhou, Gao the Duke of Bi (畢公高), whose last name was Ji. During the Spring and Autumn period, an official of the Zheng kingdom, Feng Jian Zi was awarded the land of Feng (Henan province). The Jin kingdom besieged Feng and gave it to Wei Zhang Qing. Thus descendants of Wei Zhang Qing also have the last name of Feng.

The surname originates from the southeast of Chang'an in Shaanxi Province.

== Variations ==
English spelling variations include:

- Ma (Mandarin)
- Feng (Mandarin spelling)
- Fung (Cantonese spelling, originating from China and Hong Kong)
- Foong (Cantonese spelling)
- Fong (Cantonese spelling, originating from Macau)
- Pâng (Originating from Chaozhou and Min Nan)
- Pung (Hakka dialect spelling)
- 풍 (Originating from Korea)

In Vietnam, the surname Phùng was formerly written with the same character.

== Notable people with the name Feng ==
- Feng Ba (馮跋; died 430), "Emperor" (king) of the state of Northern Yan
- Empress Dowager Feng (冯太后; 442–490), Empress and Empress Dowager of the Northern Wei Dynasty
- Feng Enhe (冯恩鹤; born 1948), Chinese actor
- Fung Fung (simplified Chinese: 冯峰; traditional Chinese: 馮峰; 1916–2000), Hong Kong actor and director
- Feng Gong (simplified Chinese: 冯巩; traditional Chinese: 馮鞏; born 1957), Chinese Xiangsheng performer
- Feng Guozhang (simplified Chinese: 冯国璋; traditional Chinese: 馮國璋; 1859–1919), Chinese military officer and politician during Republican China
- Feng Hong (馮弘; died 438), last "Emperor" (king) of the state of Northern Yan
- Feng Kun (simplified Chinese: 冯坤; traditional Chinese: 馮坤; born 1978), Chinese volleyball player
- Feng Ru (simplified Chinese: 冯如; traditional Chinese: 馮如; 1883–1912), first Chinese aviator known to fly in America
- Feng Tianwei (冯天薇; born 1986), China-born Singaporean Olympic table tennis player
- Feng Xiaogang (simplified Chinese: 冯小刚; traditional Chinese: 馮小剛; born 1958), Chinese film director
- Feng Yuxiang (simplified Chinese: 冯玉祥; traditional Chinese: 馮玉祥; 1882–1948), Chinese warlord during Republican China
- Feng Xinduo (simplified Chinese: 冯薪朵; traditional Chinese: 馮薪朵; born 1992), Member of Chinese girl group SNH48 and the captain of Team NII
- Joyce Feng (馮燕), Minister without Portfolio of the Republic of China
- Maggie Feng (born 2000), American chess player
- Shanshan Feng (冯珊珊; born 1989), Chinese golfer
- Feng Jianyu (died 2008), female Chinese murder victim killed in Singapore
- Feng Zhiqiang (冯志强; born 1998), Chinese sprinter and hurdler

== Notable people with the name Fung ==
- William Fung (馮國綸; born 1949), Hong Kong billionaire businessman, managing director of Li & Fung Group
- Margaret Chan Fung Fu-chun (陈冯富珍; born 1947), Director-General of the World Health Organization
- Frederick Fung (馮檢基; born 1953), Hong Kong pro-democracy politician
- Fung Bo Bo (born 1954), Hong Kong actress, daughter of Fung Fung
- Fung Hak-on (1948–2016), Hong Kong actor and action director, son of Fung Fung
- Fung Chin Pang (馮展鵬; born 1981), Hong Kong comic artist
- Jim Fung (馮傳強; 1944–2007), Hong Kong/Australian martial artist
- Lori Fung (馮黎明; born 1963), Canadian gymnastics coach
- David Fung (馮大維; born 1988), Australian concert pianist
- Cerezo Fung a Wing (born 1983), Dutch footballer
- Mellissa Fung (born 1972/1973), Canadian journalist
- Stanley Fung (馮兆覲; 1945–2025), Hong Kong actor and film director
- Stephen Fung (馮德倫; born 1974), Hong Kong actor and director
- Victor Fung (馮國經; born 1945), Chairman of the Airport Authority Hong Kong
- Yuan-Cheng Fung (馮元楨; 1919–2019), American scientist, founding figure in bioengineering and biomechanics
- Inga DeCarlo Fung Marchand (born 1978), known as Foxy Brown, American rapper of Trinidadian and Asian ancestry
- The Fung Brothers, Comedy YouTubers consisting of David Fung (born 1986) and Andrew Fung (born 1989)

== Notable people with the name Pang ==
- Aloysius Pang (冯伟衷; 1990–2019), Singaporean actor, who died on 23 January 2019 after sustaining serious crush injuries while attending SAF reservist training in New Zealand.
- Alvin Pang (冯启明; born 1972), Singaporean author
- Prajogo Pangestu, Indonesian business magnate and investor
- Mari Elka Pangestu, Former Minister of Trade of Indonesia

== Notable people with the name Pung ==
- Jackie Pung (1921–2017), American professional golfer who played on the LPGA Tour
