= Amadeo (Austrian record label) =

Record label in Vienna, 1956 to 1974

- Founded: 1956
- Genre: Jazz, classical
- Country of origin: Austria
- Location: Vienna

Amadeo Österreichische Schallplatten Ges.m.b.H. (Amadeo Austrian Records Limited) was an Austrian record label founded in 1956 and based in Vienna. "Ges.m.b.H." is an abbreviation for Gesellschaft mit beschränkter Haftung, an Austrian Limited Liability Company.

== Acquisition by Polydor ==
In June 1974, Polydor International purchased all the shares of the Amadeo Joint Stock Company, changing the companies configuration to Amadeo Ltd. Co. Stefan von Friedberg, then Amadeo's president, resigned and accepted a position as general manager of Ariola Schallplatten. Gerhard Gebhardt, who, at the time, had responsibility for all Austrian companies in the Polydor group, became the new general manager. Also, Franz Wallner, who had served as manager of exports and special disks at Phonodisc, became manager of marketing and sales. Polydor is part of Universal Music Group.

== Recording artists ==
Classical

- Vienna Radio Symphony Orchestra

Jazz

- Christian Maurer
- Wolfgang Puschnig
- Vienna Art Orchestra
- Wolfgang Muthspiel
- Christian Muthspiel
- Linda Sharrock
- Woody Schabata
- Karlheinz Miklin
- Hans Joachim Roedelius
- Duo Due
- Air Mail
- Bumi Fian
- Red Sun
- Roland Dahinden
- Harry Pepl
- Georg Breinschmid
- Nicos Jaritz
- Willi Fantl
- Fred Martin
- Vic Dickenson
- Ruby Braff
- Hans Koller
- James P. Johnson
- Kansas City Six
- Ingo
- Fred Böhler
- Ted Evans
- Dieter Glawischnig
- Josel Trio
- Magnolia Jazz Band
- Harald Neuwirth
- New Austrian Big Band
- Original Storyville Jazzband
- Printers Jazzband
- Twilight Stompers
- Vienna Jazz Group
- Wirkliches Jazztrio
- The Monterey Moodmixers
- Oscar Klein
- Franco Ambrosetti
- Friedrich Gulda
- Sextett Der Preistrager
- Karel Krautgartner
- Bill Grah
- Peter Haydu
- Blue Brass Connection
- Paul Whiteman
- Antonio Carlos Jobim
- Buck Clayton
- Rolf Kuhn
- Sidney Bechet

Pop

- Jack Grunsky (Jack's Angels)

== Personnel ==
Under the independent label

- Dr. Henry Haerdtl, founder and managing director until 1966
- Stefan von Friedberg, who joined Amadeo in 1961 and served as director of sales and exports, became managing director in 1966
- Picco Pacher, manager

Under the ownership of Polydor

- Gerhard Gebhardt, general manager
- Franz Wallner, manager marketing & sales (Wallner moved on to become director of Musica Musikverlag, an Austrian record label)
- Wolfgang Arming, president of Polygram Austria
