= Fung =

Fung may refer to:

- Feng (surname), a Chinese surname that is Fung in Cantonese
- Funj people, also spelled Fung

== See also ==
- Phung (disambiguation)
