= Harry Sokal (musician) =

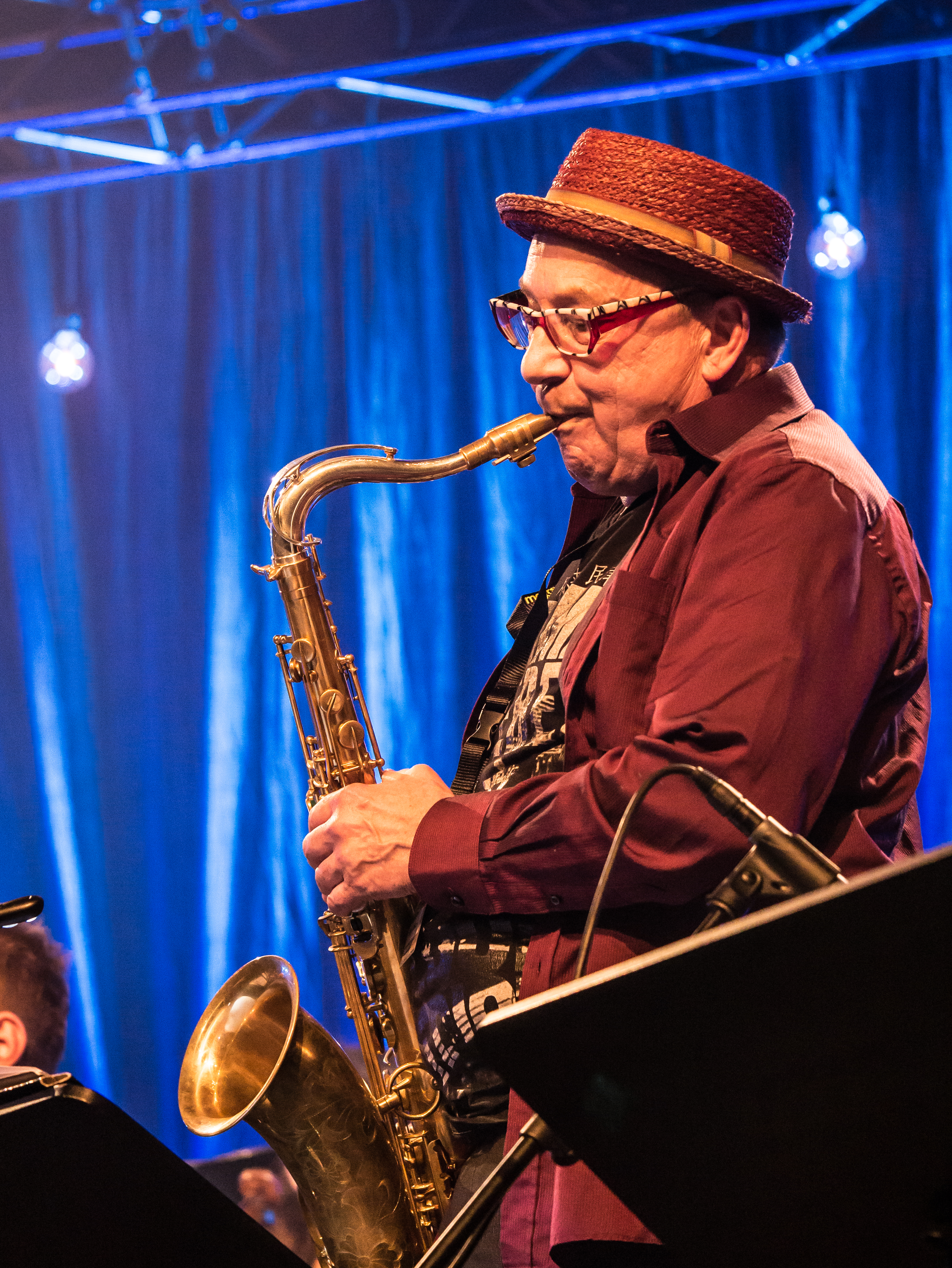
- Sokal at the Moers Festival in 2015

Background information
- Born: Harald Sokal; 18 March 1954 (age 72); Vienna, Austria
- Genres: Jazz
- Occupation: Musician
- Instrument: Saxophone
- Years active: 1974–present
- Label: Lotus
- Formerly of: Vienna Art Orchestra
- Website: harrysokal.com

Harald Sokal (born 18 March 1954) is an Austrian jazz saxophonist.

== Biography ==
Sokal attended piano and clarinet lessons from the age of six and studied clarinet and musical theory at the Vienna Conservatory.

Between 1977 and 1985, he performed with his own band "Timeless", and joined the Vienna Art Orchestra in 1977, in which he played, except for a four-year break, until he left in 2010. His most recent band project is the group Depart, an energetic saxophone trio with Jojo Mayer on drums and Heiri Känzig on bass, which was founded in 1985 and revives the alpine music tradition with the most varied forms of contemporary jazz.

He has collaborated with a variety of European and American jazz musicians including Art Blakey, Wolfert Brederode, Dave Holland, Terje Rypdal, Daniel Humair, Michel Portal, Mike Richmond, Mino Cinelu, Friedrich Gulda, Idris Muhammad, Joe Zawinul, Harry Pepl, Gene Jackson, and Andy McKee. He was a member of the Art Farmer Quintet from 1979 to 1999.

Sokal has also contributed to many Austrian pop productions, including the Hallucination Company, Wolfgang Ambros, Falco s album Einzelhaft.

He also teaches saxophone and improvisation at the Anton Bruckner Private University in Linz.

== Honors ==
- 2005: Awarded the Hans Koller Prize as Musician of the Year

== Discography ==
=== As leader ===
- Sokal Scherer Kaenzig Dudli (Extraplatte, 1984)
- Rave the Jazz (PAO, 1996)
- Full Circle (Koch, 1997)
- Roots Ahead (PAO, 2001)
- Red - White - Red & Spangled (Universal, 2002)
- Voices of Time (Universal, 2005)
- Stories (TCB, 2010)
- Depart: Refire (Intakt, 2014)
- I Remember Art (Alessa, 2016)

=== As sideman ===
With the Vienna Art Orchestra

- Tango from Obango (Art, 1980)
- Concerto Piccolo (Hat ART, 1981)
- Suite for the Green Eighties (Hat ART, 1982)
- From No Time to Rag Time (Hat ART, 1983)
- The Minimalism of Erik Satie (Hat ART, 1984)
- A Notion in Perpetual Motion (Hat ART, 1985)
- Serapionsmusic (Moers Music, 1984)
- Perpetuum Mobile (Hat Hut, 1985)
- Jazzbuhne Berlin '85 (Amiga, 1986)
- Nightride of a Lonely Saxophoneplayer (Moers Music, 1986)
- Two Little Animals (Moers Music, 1988)
- Inside Out Live '87 (Moers Music, 1988)
- Blues for Brahms (Amadeo, 1989)
- The Innocence of Cliches (Amadeo, 1990)
- Chapter II (Amadeo, 1991)
- Standing...what? (Amadeo, 1993)
- The Original Charts (Verve, 1994)
- American Rhapsody (RCA Victor, 1998)
- Duke Ellington's Sound of Love (TCB, 1999)
- A Centenary Journey (Quinton, 2001)
- All That Strauss (TCB, 2000)
- Artistry in Rhythm: A European Suite (TCB, 2000)
- Duke Ellington's Sound of Love Vol. 2 (EmArcy, 2003)
- Big Band Poesie (EmArcy, 2004)
- Swing & Affairs (EmArcy, 2005)
- 3 (EmArcy, 2007)
- Third Dream (Extraplatte, 2009)
- The Big Band Years (EmArcy, 2010)

With others

- Wolfgang Ambros, Es Lebe Der Zentralfriedhof (Bacillus/Bellaphon, 1975)
- Jean-Paul Bourelly, Mag Five (PAO, 1998)
- Arik Brauer, Geburn Fur Die Gruabn (Amadeo, 1988)
- Raul de Souza, Soul & Creation (PAO, 2008)
- Falco, Einzelhaft (GiG, 1982)
- Art Farmer, Foolish Memories (Bellaphon, 1981)
- Art Farmer, Live at Jazzland (Koch, 1990)
- Stephen Ferguson, Multitracks (Blackplastic, 1983)
- Stephen Ferguson, Piano Wind Brass (Extraplatte, 1990)
- Thomas Gansch, Gansch & Roses (Quinton, 2002)
- Andre Heller, Verwunschen (Mandragora, 1980)
- Ludwig Hirsch, Zartbitter (Polydor, 1980)
- Herbert Joos, Change of Beauty (Jazzhaus, 2018)
- Hansi Lang, Hansi Lang (OK Musica, 1989)
- Michael Mantler, The Jazz Composer's Orchestra Update (ECM, 2014)
- Wolfgang Puschnig, Two Songs for Another Lovely War (Ex Zed, 1988)
- Jasper van 't Hof, On the Move (Intuition, 2015)
- Wang Chung, Mosaic (Geffen, 1986)
- Peter Wolf, Poetic Sound Music for Lovers and Loosers (Intercord, 1975)
