= Georg Breinschmid =

Austrian double bass player

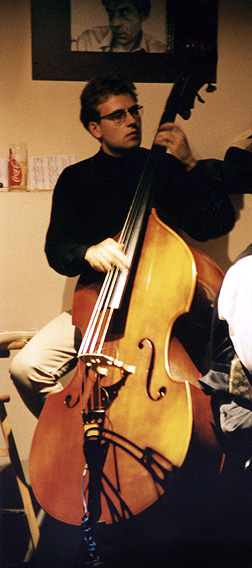

Background information
- Born: April 23, 1973 (age 53); Amstetten, Lower Austria
- Genres: Jazz, classical
- Occupation: Musician
- Instrument: Double bass
- Years active: 1990s–present
- Label: Preiser
- Website: georgbreinschmid.com

Georg Breinschmid (born 25 April 1973) is an Austrian double bass player.

== Biography ==
Breinschmid studied classical double bass at the University of Music and Performing Arts in Vienna and substituted in Viennese orchestras as a student. From 1994 to 1996 he played with the Tonkünstler Orchestra, then with the Orchestra of the Vienna State Opera and the Vienna Philharmonic, touring Europe, America, and Asia.

In 1998, Breinschmid quit classical music in favor of jazz. He played with the Vienna Art Orchestra, the Zipflo Weinrich Group, and gave concerts in ensembles throughout Europe. He has worked with Charlie Mariano, Archie Shepp, Kenny Wheeler, Jasper van 't Hof, Adam Taubitz, Harry Sokal, Thomas Gansch, and Christian Muthspiel. He issued the album Tanzen (Dancing) with singer Agnes Heginger in 2005.

== Awards ==
- 2002 Hans Koller Prize for Album of the Year, Mauve
- 2003 Hans Koller Prize for Newcomer of the Year

== Discography ==
=== As leader or co-leader ===
- 2005 Tanzen with Agnes Heginger
- 2008 Wien bleibt Krk (Zappel)
- 2010 Brein's World (Preiser)
- 2012 Fire (Preiser)
- 2013 Gansch and Breinschmid Live with Thomas Gansch (Preiser)
- 2014 Double Brein (Preiser)
- 2017 Strings and Bass with Matthias Bartolomey, Johannes Dickbauer, Florian Willeitner (Gramola)

=== As sideman ===
- 2007 Against the Wind, Christian Muthspiel
- 2011 Sherlock Holmes: A Game of Shadows, Hans Zimmer
