= Wolfgang Puschnig =

Austrian jazz musician and composer (born 1956)

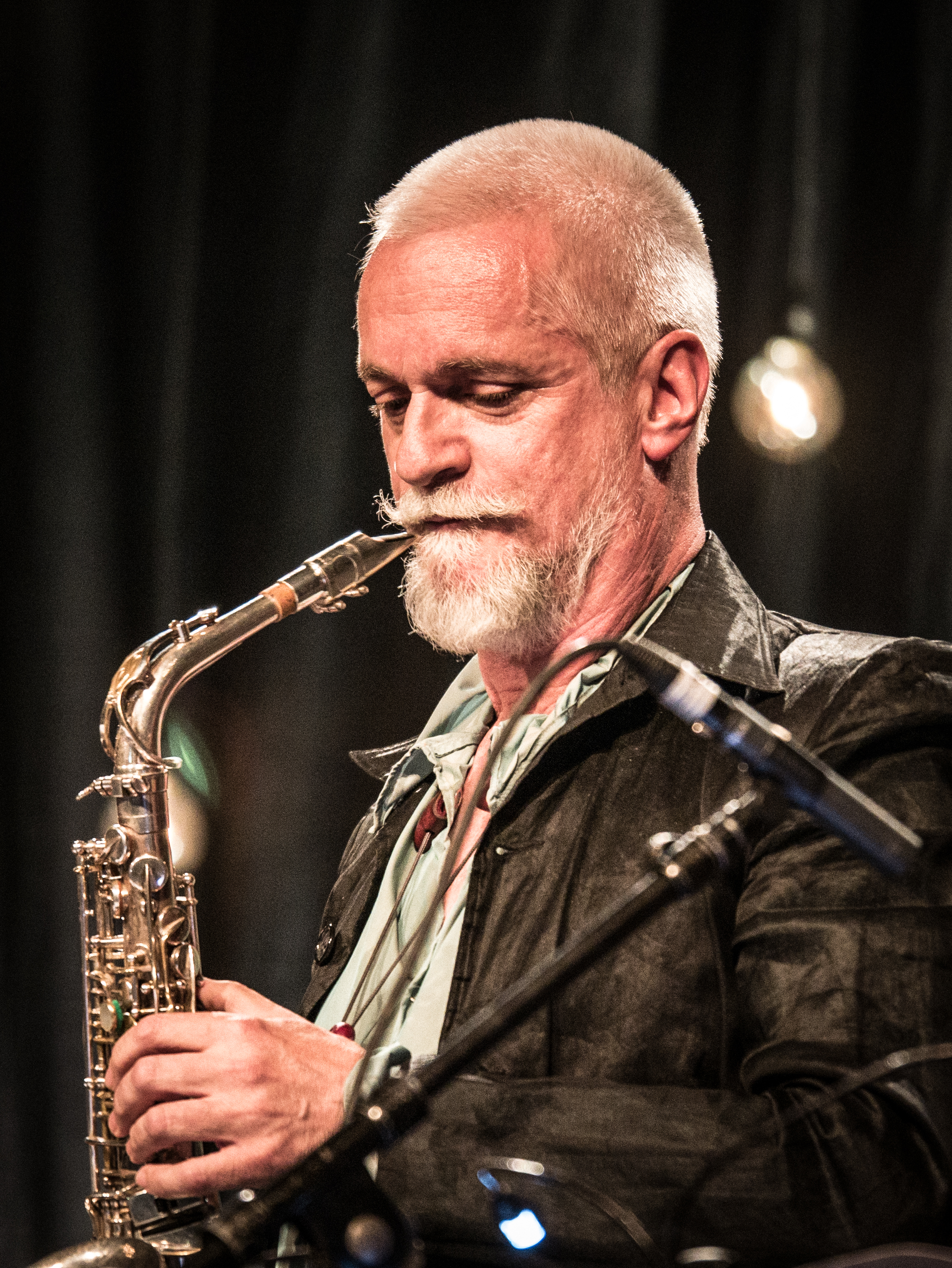
- Puschnig at Moers Festival 2015.

Background information
- Born: 21 May 1956 (age 70); Klagenfurt, Austria
- Origin: Austria
- Occupations: Musician, composer
- Instruments: Saxophone, clarinet, flute
- Years active: 1975–present
- Labels: ECM Records, Amadeo, EmArcy
- Formerly of: Vienna Art Orchestra
- Website: www.puschnig.com

Wolfgang Puschnig (born 21 May 1956 in Klagenfurt, Austria) is an Austrian jazz musician (saxophone, flute, bass clarinet) and composer.

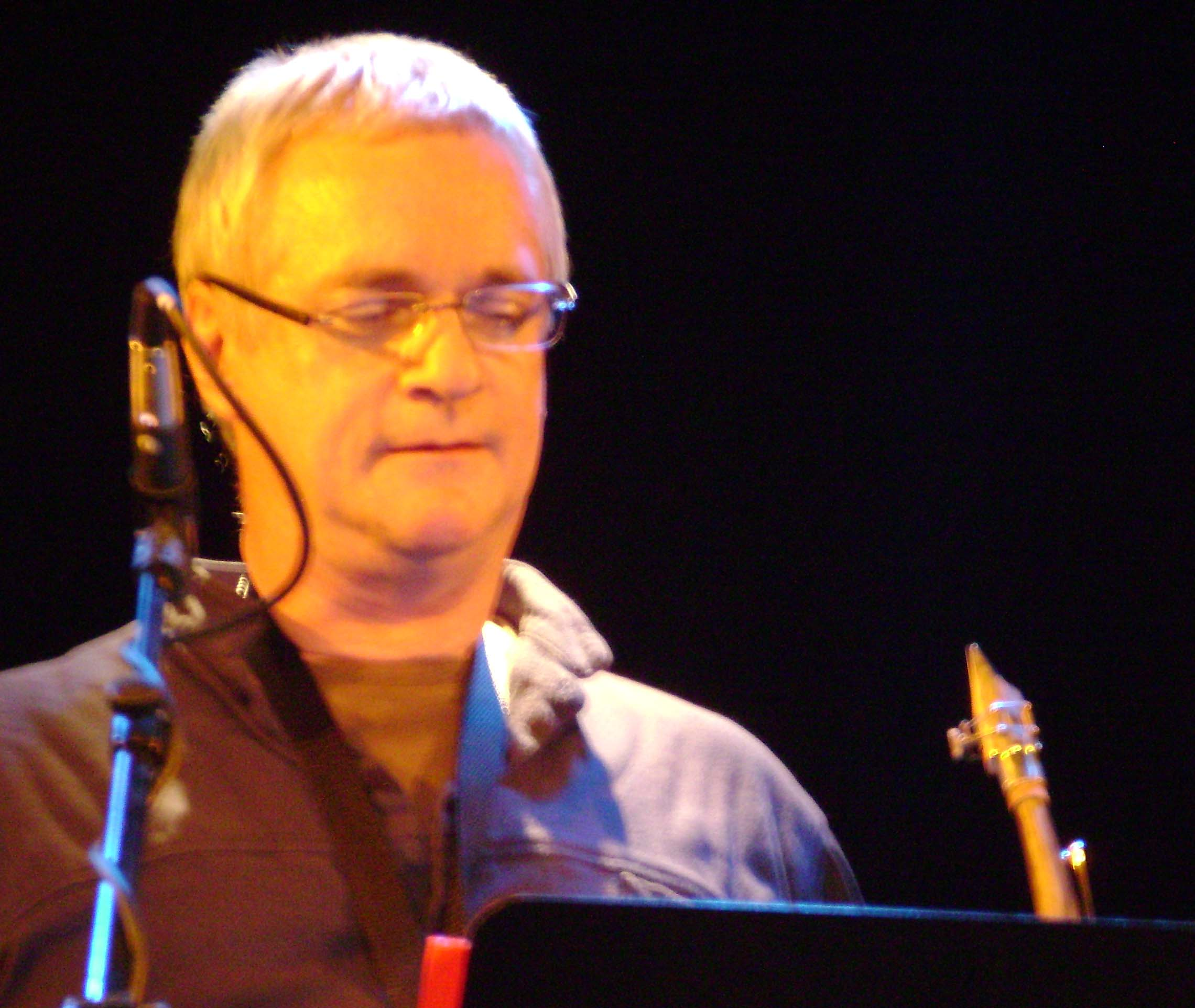
Puschnig 2008 at a concert with Saxofour

== Biography ==
After his studies of saxophone and flute at the Vienna Conservatory Puschnig was the founding member of the Vienna Art Orchestra together with Mathias Rüegg in the mid-1970s. Here he was active until 1989. He was also involved in projects with Ernst Jandl involving Lauren Newton. He also played with Hans Koller in the early 1980s, with the quartet 'Air Mail' and 'Saxofour'. Carla Bley brought him into her groups in the mid 1980s. He worked with Wolfgang Mitterer, Uli Scherer, and his longtime partner Linda Sharrock and Jamaaladeen Tacuma in different groups, and also has cooperated with Reinhard Flatischler, Herbert Joos, Christof Lauer, and Michel Godard. In the project "Alpine Aspects" he started in 1991 with jazz musicians and the Amstetten musicians together (most recently at the JazzFest Berlin 2006 and at Musikfest Waidhofen / Thaya 2007). In addition, he has repeatedly performed with the Korean percussion ensemble SamulNori.

Puschnig is professor at the University of Music and Performing Arts Vienna and former Head of the Department of Popular Music.

== Honors (selection) ==
- 1998: Hans Koller Prize as "Jazz Musician of the Year"
- 2003: Recognition Award of Carinthia
- 2004: The first musician to receive an honorary doctorate from the University of Klagenfurt
- 2016: Officer's Cross of the State of Carinthia's Order of Merit (Großes Ehrenzeichen des Landes Kärnten)
- 2022: Cultural Prize of Carinthia (Kulturpreis des Landes Kärnten)

== Discography ==
=== Solo albums ===
- 1988: Pieces Of The Dream (Amadeo)
- 1991: Alpine Aspects (Amadeo)
- 1995: Mixed Metaphors (Amadeo)
- 1997: Dream Weavers (Label Hopi)
- 1998: Roots & Fruits (EmArcy)
- 1999: Aspects (Pao Records)
- 2001: Chants (Quinton Records)
- 2006: Things Change: The 50th Anniversary Box (EmArcy), 3xCD

=== Collaborations ===
With Ernst Jandl

- 1984: Bist Eulen? (Extraplatte)
- 1988: Vom Vom Zum Zum (Extraplatte)

With 'Air Mail' (Harry Pepl, Mike Richmond, Wolfgang Puschnig, Wolfgang Reisinger)

- 1985: Prayer For Peace (Moers Music)
- 1988: Light Blues (Amadeo, LP)
- 2001: Light Blues (EmArcy, CD)

With 'AM 4' (Wolfgang Puschnig / Linda Sharrock / Uli Scherer)

- 1989: ... And She Answered: (ECM Records)

With Red Sun Samulnori (Choi Jong Sil, Kang Min Seok, Kim Duk-Soo, Lee Kwang Soo)

- 1989: Red Sun Samulnori (Amadeo)
- 1994: Then Comes The White Tiger (ECM Records)
- 1995: Nanjang - A new Horizon (Amadeo, Antilles)

With Carla Bley

- 1991: The Very Big Carla Bley Band (WATT Works)
- 1996: The Carla Bley Big Band Goes to Church (WATT Works)
- 2000: 4x4 (WATT Works)
- 2003: Looking for America (WATT Works)
- 2008: Appearing Nightly (WATT Works)

With Paul Urbanek and Hans Koller

- 2000: The Hans Koller Concept (Extraplatte)
- 2002: The Hans Koller Concept 2 (Extraplatte)

With the Vienna Art Orchestra

- Tango from Obango (Art, 1980)
- Concerto Piccolo (Hat ART, 1981)
- Suite for the Green Eighties (Hat ART, 1982)
- From No Time to Rag Time (Hat ART, 1983)
- The Minimalism of Erik Satie (Hat ART, 1984)
- A Notion in Perpetual Motion (Hat ART, 1985)

With other projects

- 1986: Obsoderso (Moers Music), as Wolfgang Puschnig / Wolfgang Mitterer
- 1986: Pat Brothers No. 1. (Moers Music), with The Pat Brothers (Wolfgang Mitterer, Wolfgang Puschnig)
- 1988: Two Songs For Another Lovely War (Ex Zed Records), as Wolfgang Puschnig / Christian Radovan / Wolfgang Reisinger / Uli Scherer / Heiri Kaenzig / Harry Sokal / Mathias Rüegg
- 1998: Holy Aureols Esoteric (Esovision), as Wolfgang Puschnig and Stefan Benkö
- 1998: Spaces (EmArcy), as Wolfgang Puschnig • Mark Feldman
- 1998: hot ROOM (Extraplatte), as Lechner / Puschnig / Tang / Youssef
- 2000: Almost Blue (EmArcy), with Willi Resetarits
- 2002: Grey (Quinton Records), as Wolfgang Puschnig | Steve Swallow | Don Alias | Victor Lewis
- 2002: Red - White - Red & Spangled (Universal Music Austria), with Harry Sokal
- 2005: Odem (EmArcy), as Wolfgang Puschnig, Jatinder Thakur, Dhafer Youssef
- 2005: Color Fields (Unit Records), as Newton - Huber - Puschnig
- 2005: Voices Of Time (Universal Music Austria), with Harry Sokal
- 2007: Late Night Show Part II (Quinton Records), as Puschnig / Sharrock
- 2008: Gemini Gemini (ITM ARCHIVES, 2xCD), with Jamaaladeen Tacuma
- 2008: Alpine Aspects - Homage To O.C. (EmArcy), as Wolfgang Puschnig | Robert Pussecker
- 2010: Terra (Leo Records), with Sainkho Namtchylak
- 2010: For the Love of Ornette (Jam-All), with Jamaaladeen Tacuma
- 2011: Berühren (PAN TAU-X Records), with Triomobile (Ponger, Roder, Soyka, Puschnig)
- 2014: The Jazz Composer's Orchestra Update (ECM Records), with Michael Mantler
