= Fanger =

Fanger is a surname. Notable people with the surname include:

- Daniel Fanger (born 1988), Swiss footballer
- Élisabeth Fanger (born 1956), French author
- Povl Ole Fanger (1934–2006), Danish academic and engineer

== See also ==
- Fenger
- Ranger (surname)
