= From No Time to Rag Time =

Live album by Vienna Art Orchestra
- Released: 1983
- Recorded: October 21, 1982
- Venue: Muhle Hunziken, Rubigen, Switzerland.
- Genre: Contemporary classical music, Jazz
- Length: 75:00
- Label: Hat ART Hat Art 1999/2000
- Producer: Werner X. Uehlinger, Pia Uehlinger

Vienna Art Orchestra chronology
Suite for the Green Eighties (1982)	From No Time to Rag Time (1983)	The Minimalism of Erik Satie (1984)

From No Time to Rag Time is an album by European jazz group the Vienna Art Orchestra featuring variations on compositions by Anthony Braxton, Ornette Coleman, Scott Joplin, Hans Koller, Charles Mingus, Fritz Pauer, Bud Powell and Roswell Rudd which was first released in 1983 on the Hat ART label.

== Reception ==
Professional ratings
Review scores
Source	Rating
Allmusic	4.5/5 stars

Writing for Allmusic, reviewer Michael G. Nastos commended the 13-member band as “powerful atonal improvisors,” especially Lauren Newton (vocals), Herbert Joos (flugelhorn), Harry Sokal (saxophone and flute), and Wolfgang Puschnig (saxophone). Nastos recommended “Variations About Silence (For Ornette)” and “Jelly Roll, but Mingus Rolls Better” as the best tracks on the album.

== Track listing ==
1. "Variations about N 508-10 (4G)" (Anthony Braxton/Mathias Rüegg) − 10:43
2. "Variations about Keep Your Heart Right" (Roswell Rudd/Mathias Rüegg) − 11:19
3. "Variations About Silence" (Ornette Coleman/Mathias Rüegg) − 14:57
4. "Un Poco Loco" (Bud Powell) − 6:47
5. "Variations about A Liberate Proposal" (Fritz Pauer/Mathias Rüegg) − 5:49
6. "Variations about Soma" (Hans Koller/Mathias Rüegg) − 10:43
7. "Jelly Roll, But Mingus Rolls Better" (Charles Mingus/Mathias Rüegg) − 10:39
8. "Variations about The Cascades" (Scott Joplin/Mathias Rüegg) − 4:03

== Personnel ==
- Mathias Rüegg − arranger, conductor
- Karl Fian − trumpet
- Herbert Joos − flugelhorn, alphorn, double trumpet
- Christian Radovan − trombone
- Billy Fuchs − tuba
- Wolfgang Puschnig − soprano saxophone, alto saxophone, bass clarinet, flute
- Harry Sokal − soprano saxophone, tenor saxophone, flute
- Roman Schwaller − tenor saxophone, clarinet
- Uli Scherer − piano, melodica
- Woody Schabata - marimba, vibraphone
- Jürgen Wuchner − bass
- Wolfgang Reisinger, Janusz Stefanski - drums, percussion
- Lauren Newton - voice
