= Mathias Rüegg =

European musician, composer, and bandleader

- Born: 8 December 1952 (age 73); Zurich, Switzerland
- Genres: Jazz
- Occupations: Composer, bandleader, director
- Years active: 1975–present
- Website: http://www.vao.at/v2/display.php?id=63

Mathias Rüegg (born 8 December 1952) is a European musician, composer, and bandleader best known as founder and director of the Vienna Art Orchestra from 1977 to 2010.

== Biography ==
Born in Zurich, Switzerland, son of linguist Robert Rüegg, Mathias Rüegg began playing jazz in secondary school. Trained as a schoolteacher, he taught for a while in special-needs schools. From 1973 to 1975 he attended the Musikhochschule in Graz, Austria, studying classical composition and jazz piano. In Vienna he performed in a nightclub as a solo jazz pianist, joined later by saxophonist Wolfgang Puschnig. The duo formed the core of an ensemble that in 1977 became the Vienna Art Orchestra.

Rüegg's distinctive, often humorous compositions have drawn on a range of influences, from traditional folk music to classics. He has also led the VAO to explore the big band repertory of American jazz composers such as Duke Ellington. Besides the traditional big-band complement, his orchestrations have prominently featured such instruments as the tuba, piccolo, bass clarinet, alphorn, exotic percussion, and wordless vocals. Rüegg has composed hundreds of pieces for the Vienna Art Orchestra, other European big bands, and classical orchestras, as well as theatre music and film music. Since 1994 he has composed several works for soloist and chamber orchestra.

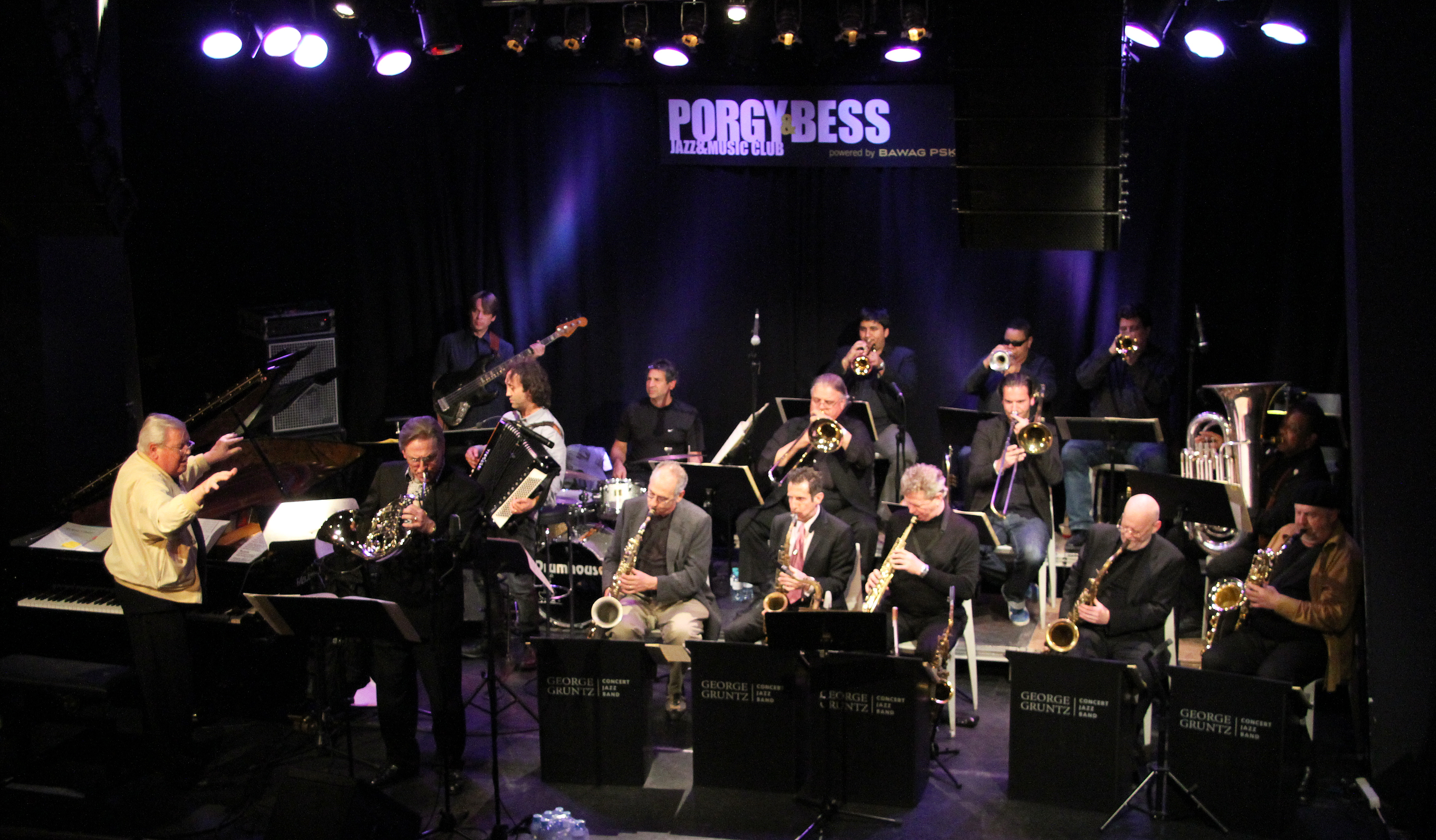
The George Gruntz Concert Jazz Band in 2011 playing at Porgy & Bess, the music club Rüegg founded

Besides managing the VAO, Rüegg has conducted workshops in Europe, worked as artistic director for music festivals, and headed multimedia and music-related projects. From 1983 to 1987 he directed the Vienna Art Choir. In 1991, he produced the film Mozart's Balls, commissioned by the BBC for the 1991 Mozart Year.

Rüegg founded the Porgy & Bess music club in Vienna and the Hans Koller Prize for Austrian jazz.

In 2011, in New York he composed the music for the new show of the Big Apple Circus.

In 2013, he arranged for and played piano for singer Lia Pale from Wels, Upper Austria.

== Discography ==
With the Vienna Art Orchestra

- Tango from Obango (Art, 1980)
- Concerto Piccolo (Hat ART, 1981)
- Suite for the Green Eighties (Hat ART, 1982)
- From No Time to Rag Time (Hat ART, 1983)
- The Minimalism of Erik Satie (Hat ART, 1984)
- A Notion in Perpetual Motion (Hat ART, 1985)
- Blues for Brahms (Amadeo, 1989)
- Third Dream (Extraplatte, 2009)

With others

- Mel-an-Cho with Herbert Joos (Plane, 1981)
- From No Art to Mo(Z)Art with Vienna Art Choir (Moers Music, 1983)
- Five Old Songs with Vienna Art Choir (Moers Music, 1984)
