= Phung =

Phung may refer to:

- Phùng, a Vietnamese surname
- Phùng (township), Đan Phượng District, Hà Nội, Vietnam
- Phung River (disambiguation), several rivers in Thailand

== See also ==
- Feng (disambiguation)
