= A Notion in Perpetual Motion =

Live album by Vienna Art Orchestra
- Released: 1985
- Recorded: October 21, 1982
- Venues: Muhle Hunziken, Rubigen, Switzerland.
- Genres: Contemporary classical music, Jazz
- Length: 81:27 Original 2LP release
- Label: Hat ART Hat Art 2024
- Producers: Werner X. Uehlinger, Pia Uehlinger

Vienna Art Orchestra chronology
The Minimalism of Erik Satie (1984)	A Notion in Perpetual Motion (1985)	Jazzbühne Berlin 85 (1985)

Perpetuum Mobile Cover

A Notion in Perpetual Motion is a live album by European jazz group the Vienna Art Orchestra recorded in Switzerland which was first released in 1985 on the Hat ART label as a double LP as Perpetuum Mobile then re-released in 1992 as a single CD.

== Reception ==
Professional ratings
Review scores
Source	Rating
Allmusic	4/5 stars

The Allmusic review stated: "the most notable thing about the Vienna Art Orchestra is its stage presence: Rüegg knows how to create drama and surprise and his musicians are more than up to the challenge, clearly delighting themselves in the process. A Notion in Perpetual Motion is as close to a "perfect" live recording of the VAO as you are likely to find".

== Track listing ==
All compositions by Mathias Rüegg except where noted

1. "Sighs from South-Carinthia" – 11:01
2. "Woodworms in the Roots" – 8:42
3. "Voices Without Words" – 5:25
4. "Life at the Dead Sea" – 9:46
5. "Lady Delay" – 9:27
6. "Romana" – 6:04
7. "A Natural Sound" – 3:12
8. "'Round Midnight" (Thelonious Monk, Cootie Williams, Bernie Hanighen) – 8:37
9. "French Alphorn" – 8:53
10. "H.M. Blues" (Bhumibo Adoleaydej) – 5:27
11. "Zoge Am Boge" – 4:50 Omitted from CD reissue

== Personnel ==
- Mathias Rüegg − arranger, conductor
- Lauren Newton - voice
- Karl "Bumi" Fian, Hannes Kottek − trumpet, flugelhorn
- Herbert Joos − flugelhorn, alphorn, double trumpet
- Christian Radovan − trombone
- John Sass − tuba
- Wolfgang Puschnig − sopranino saxophone, alto saxophone, bass clarinet, flute, piccolo
- Harry Sokal − soprano saxophone, tenor saxophone, flute
- Roman Schwaller − tenor saxophone
- Uli Scherer − piano, Fender piano, Yamaha DX7
- Woody Schabata - marimba, vibraphone
- Heiri Kaenzig − bass
- Wolfgang Reisinger, Janusz Stefanski - drums, percussion
