= Lauren Newton =

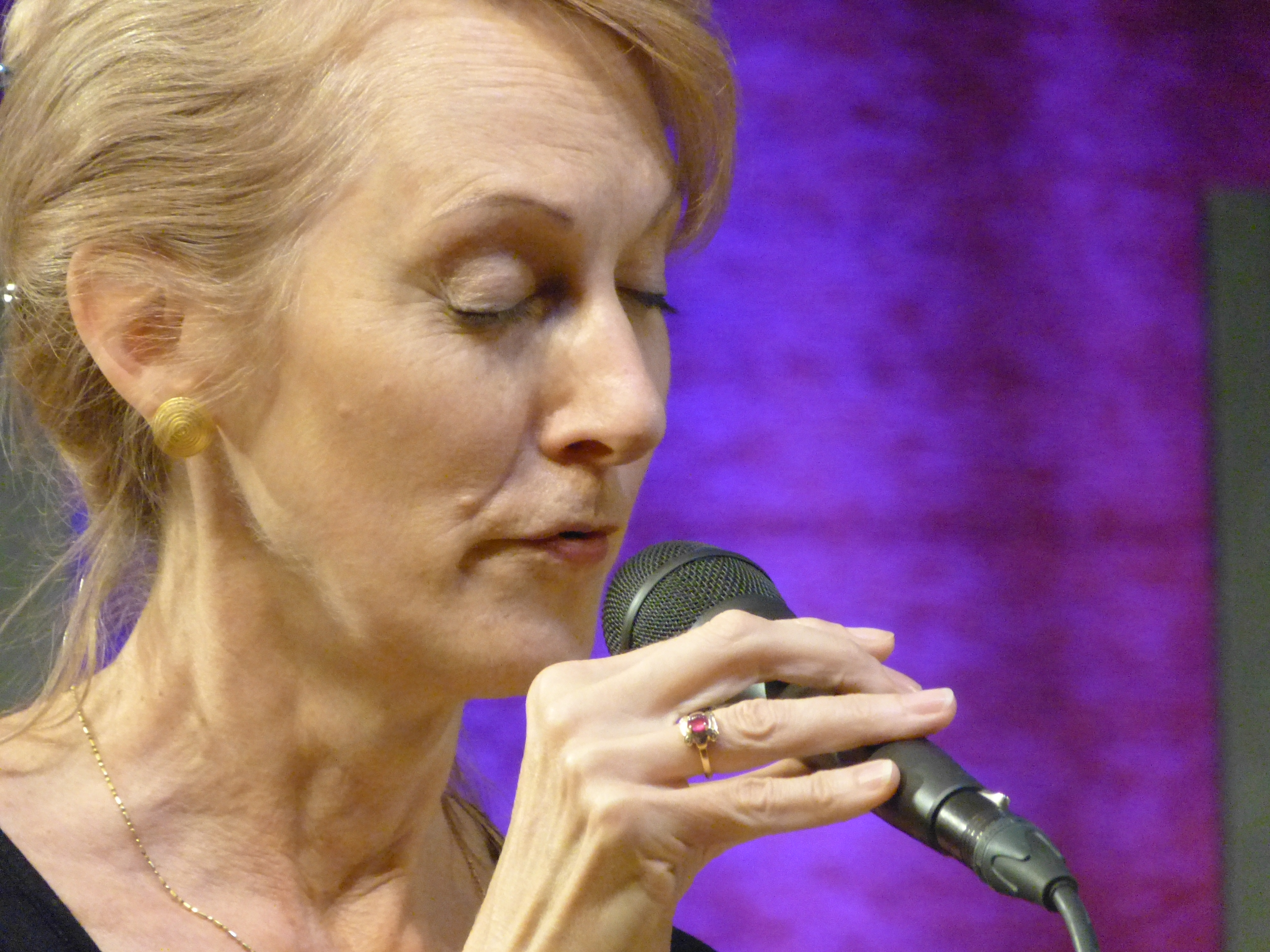
- Lauren Newton performs at the Loft in Cologne, Germany, in 2015.

Background information
- Born: Lauren Amber Newton; November 16, 1952 (age 73); Coos Bay, Oregon, U.S.
- Genres: Avant-garde jazz, contemporary classical
- Occupation: Singer
- Years active: 1977–present
- Labels: Leo
- Website: laurennewton.com

Lauren Amber Newton (born 16 November 1952) is an avant-garde jazz and contemporary classical singer and founding member of the Vienna Art Orchestra.

== Biography ==
Newton earned a degree in music at the University of Oregon. In 1974 she moved to Europe and continued her music studies with Sylvia Geszty at the State University of Music and Performing Arts Stuttgart. In 1977 she joined the Vienna Art Orchestra, touring widely with the group until 1989. With Bobby McFerrin, Jeanne Lee, Urszula Dudziak and Jay Clayton she formed the Vocal Summit in 1982.

Newton combines conventional techniques with unconventional vocal sounds. She has taught at the Berlin University of the Arts, University of Music and Performing Arts, Graz in Austria, Folkwang Hochschule in Essen, Germany, and Lucerne University of Applied Sciences and Arts in Lucerne, Switzerland.

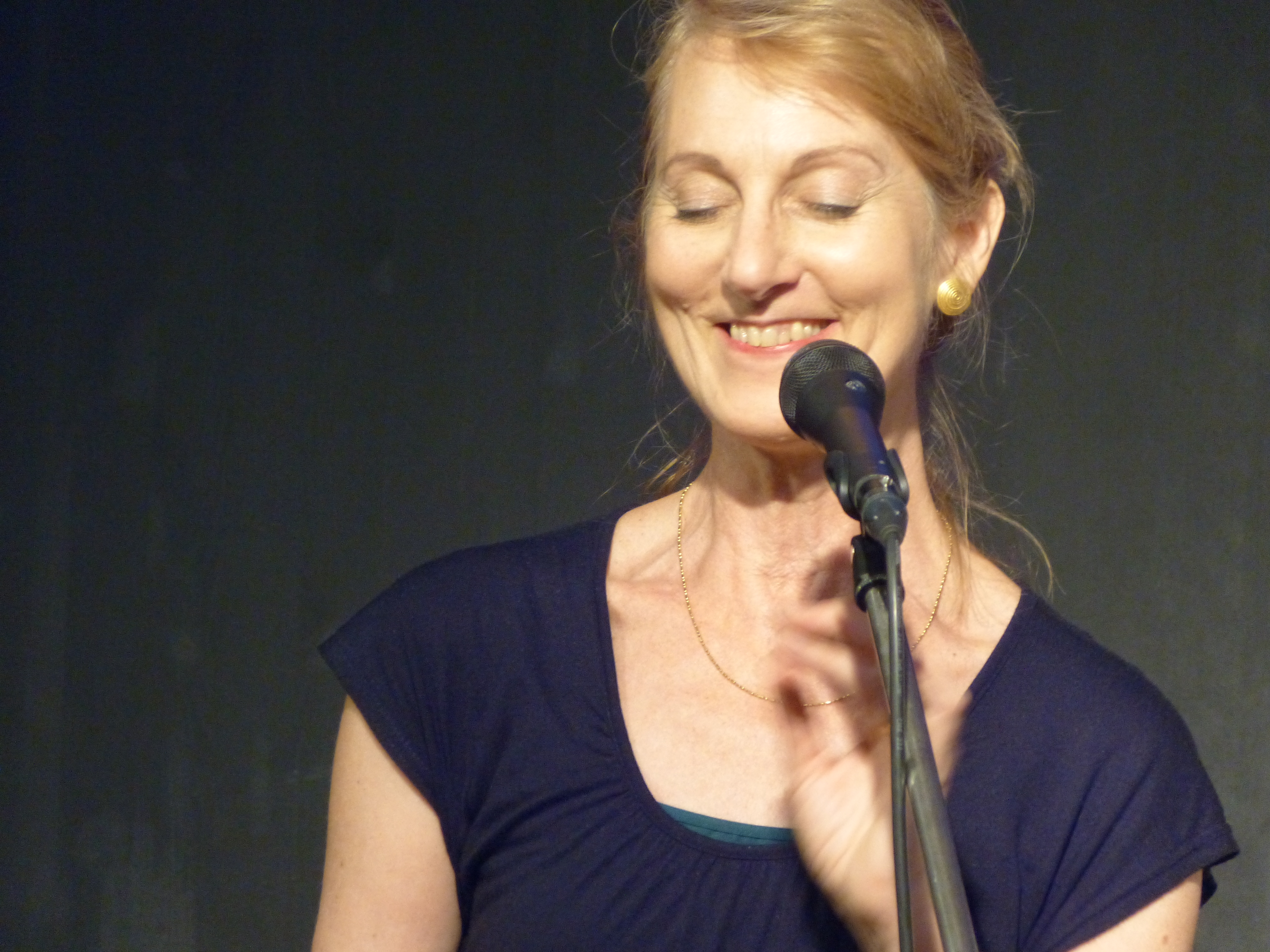
Lauren Newton in Germany, 2015 (Photo by Annamarie Ursula)

Her debut album, Timbre (1983), won the Annual German Critics Award. During the next ten years, she collaborated with Austrian poet Ernst Jandl. She has also worked with Jon Rose, Fritz Hauser, Vladimir Tarasov, Anthony Braxton, Christy Doran, Bernd Konrad, Peter Kowald, Joachim Kühn, Joëlle Léandre, Urs Leimgruber, Patrick Scheyder, Aki Takase, and the Südpool-Ensemble directed by Herbert Joos.

She performed Adriana Hölszky's Comment for Lauren and other works by Hans-Joachim Hespos, Bernd Konrad, Hannes Zerbe, and Wolfgang Dauner. In 1993 she performed Wolfgang Schmiedt's adaptation for solo vocalist of Mahler's Kindertotenlieder. In 1998 she participated in the international conference Frau Musica (nova) at the conservatory in Cologne, Germany. In 2020, she received the lifetime achievement Jazz Award from the state of Baden-Wuerttemberg, Germany, followed by the German Jazz Union Albert Mangelsdorff Prize in 2025.

== Discography (selection) ==
=== As leader or co-leader ===
- Timbre (hat ART, 1983)
- Voiceprint (Extraplatte, 1988)
- Art Is... (Leo, 1994)
- Timbre, vocal quartet (Leo, 1995)
- 18 Colors w/Joëlle Léandre (Leo, 1997)
- Composition 192 with Anthony Braxton (Leo, 1996)
- Filigree (Hatology, 1998)
- Altered Egos (Omba, 1998)
- Out of Sound (Leo, 2002)
- The Lightness of Hearing (Leo, 2002)
- Face It w/Joëlle Léandre (Leo, 2005)
- Artesian Spirits (Leo, 2005)
- SoundSongs, solo (Leo, 2006)
- Aki Takase-Lauren Newton, Spring in Bangkok (Intakt CD, 2006)
- Tenderness of Stones with Joachim Gies (Leo, 2007)
- 2 Souls in Seoul (Leo, 2008)
- O How We (Bandcamp, 2010)
- Stormy Whispers w/Myra Melford and Joëlle Léandre (Bandcamp, 2020)
- Joëlle Léandre & Lauren Newton, Great Star Theater San Francisco (Bandcamp, 2024)

As member of Vienna Art Orchestra

- Tango from Obango (Extraplatte, 1979)
- Concerto Piccolo (hat ART, 1980)
- Suite for the Green Eighties (hat ART, 1982)
- From No Time to Rag Time (hat ART, 1982)
- The Minimalism of Erik Satie (hat ART, 1984)
- Jazzbühne Berlin 85 (Amiga, 1986)
- Nightride of a Lonely Saxophone Player (Moers, 1986)
- Inside Out (Moers, 1987)
- A Notion in Perpetual Motion (hat ART, 1985)
- Blues for Brahms (Amadeo, 1989)
- Innocence of Clichés (Amadeo, 1990)
- Highlights: Live in Vienna (1993)
- Two Little Animals (1994)

=== As guest ===
With Jon Rose

- 1994 Violin Music for Supermarkets
- 1995 Eine Violine fur Valentin
- 1997 Shopping.Live@Victo
- 1998 Techno Mit Storungen

With the Vienna Art Choir

- From No Art to Mo(z)art (Moers, 1983)
- Five Old Songs (Moers, 1984)
- Swiss Swing (Moers, 1986)

With the Vienna Art Special

- Serapionsmusic (Moers, 1984)

With others

- 1996 Trio LTD, Trio LTD
- 1996 Wait Until Dark, Secret Passion Orchestra
- 2000 Not Missing Drums Project, Urban Voices
- 2004 Gruntz, Chotjewitz: The Magic of a Flute, George Gruntz
