= Phong Châu (disambiguation) =

Phong Châu was the capital of Vietnam for the most part of the Hồng Bàng dynasty.

Phong Châu may also refer to:

- Phong Châu (ward), a ward of Phú Thọ town in Phú Thọ Province
- Phong Châu, Phù Ninh, a township and capital of Phù Ninh District in Phú Thọ Province
- Phong Châu, Cao Bằng, a rural commune of Trùng Khánh District
- Phong Châu, Thái Bình, a rural commune of Đông Hưng District
- Phong Châu District, a former district of Vĩnh Phú Province

== See also ==
- Fengzhou (disambiguation)
