= The Minimalism of Erik Satie =

Studio album by Vienna Art Orchestra
- Released: 1984
- Recorded: 20–22 September 1983 and 14 March 1984
- Studio: Studio Kornhäusl, Vienna, Austria
- Genre: Contemporary classical music, Jazz
- Length: 75:12
- Label: Hat ART 2005
- Producer: Werner X. Uehlinger

Vienna Art Orchestra chronology
From No Time to Rag Time (1983)	The Minimalism of Erik Satie (1984)	A Notion in Perpetual Motion (1960)

The Minimalism of Erik Satie is an album by European jazz group the Vienna Art Orchestra featuring interpretations of compositions by Erik Satie which was first released in 1984 on the Hat ART label.

== Reception ==
Professional ratings
Review scores
Source	Rating
Allmusic	4/5 stars
Penguin Guide to Jazz	👑

The Allmusic review stated "The Minimalism of Erik Satie is a rare example of the pairing of jazz and classical that actually works on both ends. Recommended".

Early editions of The Penguin Guide to Jazz awarded the release a "Crown" signifying a recording that the authors "feel a special admiration or affection for".

== Track listing ==
All compositions by Erik Satie except as indicated

1. "Reflections on Aubade" - 2:58
2. "Reflections on Méditation" - 3:35
3. "Reflections on Sévère Réprimande" - 2:57
4. "Reflections on Idylle" - 4:01
5. "Gnossienne No 3" - 3:00
6. "Reflections on Gnossienne No. 2" - 4:25
7. "Reflections on Gnossienne No. 1" - 5:53
8. "Satie Ist Mir Im Traum 3 X Nicht Erschienen" (Mathias Rüegg) - 6:23
9. "Vexations 1801" - 8:51
10. "Vexations 1611" - 9:44
11. "Vexations 2105" - 23:21

== Personnel ==
- Mathias Rüegg - arranger, conductor
- Hannes Kottek, Karl Fian - trumpet, flugelhorn
- Christian Radovan - trombone
- Jon Sass - tuba
- Wolfgang Puschnig - sopranino saxophone, alto saxophone, bass clarinet, flute
- Harry Sokal - soprano saxophone, tenor saxophone, flute
- Roman Schwaller - tenor saxophone, clarinet
- Woody Schabata - vibraphone
- Wolfgang Reisinger - percussion
- Lauren Newton - voice
