= Fenger =

Fenger is a surname. Notable people with the surname include:

- Christian Fenger (1840–1902), Danish-born surgeon and pathologist
- Else Fenger (1737–1811), Danish businesswoman
- George Fenger (1925–1993), American politician from Nebraska
- Hans Fenger undertook The Langley Schools Music Project
- Ingrid Fenger (born 1985), Australian rower
- Jakob Fenger-Larsen (born 1971), Danish association football player
- Johanne Fenger (1836–1913), Danish composer
- Ludvig Fenger (1833–1905), Danish architect
- Mads Fenger (born 1990), Danish football defender
- Martine Fenger (born 2006), Norwegian footballer
- Max Fenger (born 2001), Danish footballer
- Michael Fenger (born 1962), Danish politician and former handball player
- Oskar Fenger (born 2008), Danish footballer
- Søs Fenger (born 1961), Danish musician

== See also ==
- Finger (disambiguation)
- Feininger
- Feng (disambiguation)
- Frengers
