= K.l.a.s. =

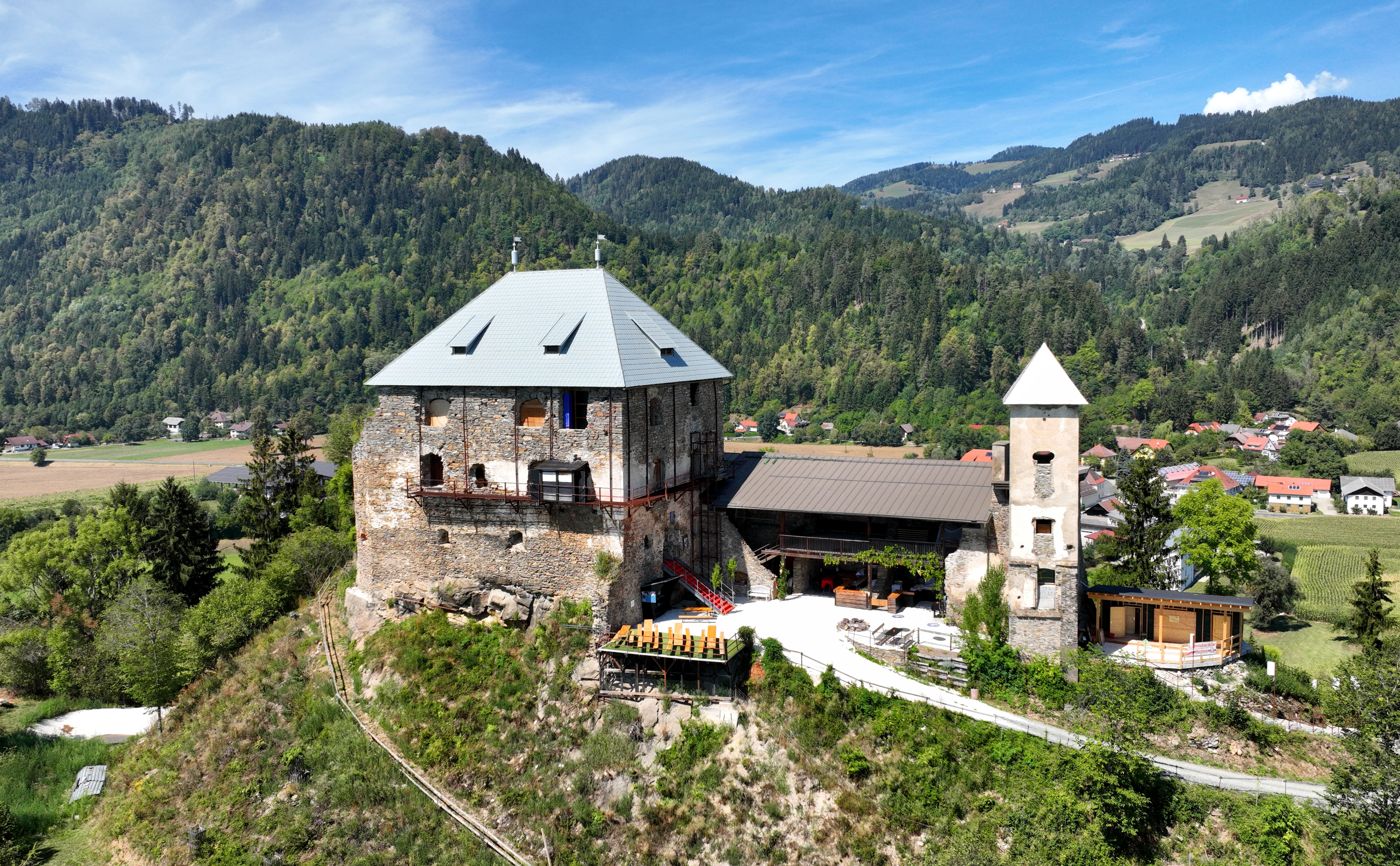
Haimburg Castle, Carinthia.

Theater k.l.a.s. was an Austrian theatre company which performed each summer at the Haimburg Castle. It was founded by the lighting and set designer Stefan Pfeistlinger and the theatre director Alexander Kubelka. Its first production was Büchner's Woyzeck (1995), and its last production was Shakespeare's Macbeth (2009). The company went into liquidation and ceased operating in June 2010 shortly before what was to have been its 16th season. Over the years, 70,000 people had attended its performances at the castle.
