= Bong (surname) =

- Language: Chinese (Hakka, Hokkien), Korean, Swedish, others

Origin
- Region of origin: Belgium, Indonesia, Malaysia, Sweden, others

Other names
- Variant forms: Chinese: Huang, Wang, Meng; Korean: Pong

Bong is a surname in various cultures.

== Origins ==
Bong may be a spelling of a number of Chinese surnames based on their pronunciation in different varieties of Chinese. They are listed below by their Hanyu Pinyin spelling, which reflects the Standard Mandarin pronunciation:

- Huáng (黃, meaning "yellow"); spelled Bong based on the Hakka pronunciation in dialects spoken in parts of Indonesia and Malaysia
- Wáng (王, meaning "king"); spelled Bong based on the Hakka pronunciation in dialects spoken in parts of Indonesia and Malaysia
- Méng (蒙); spelled Bong based on the Hokkien pronunciation (Pe̍h-ōe-jī: Bông)

Bong is the Revised Romanization spelling of a Korean surname originally written using either of two hanja. These surnames are also spelled Pong in most other systems of romanising Korean (e.g. McCune–Reischauer, Yale, and North Korea's system), and are both used as Chinese surnames as well, pronounced Fèng in Mandarin.

- Batdeul Bong (奉; 받들 봉; meaning "to offer" or "to serve")
- Bongsae Bong (鳳; 봉새 봉; the name of a mythical bird)

Bong may also be a Belgian surname of unclear origin, a Swedish surname originating from the word bang meaning "noise", and a Tibetan clan name.

== Statistics ==
In the Netherlands, there were 53 people with the surname Bong as of 2007, primarily of Chinese Indonesian origin. The 2000 South Korean census found 11,819 people in 3,629 households with the surnames spelled Bong in the Revised Romanization of Korean, divided among 11,492 people in 3,528 households for Batdeul Bong, and 327 people in 101 households for Bongsae Bong. Statistics compiled by Patrick Hanks on the basis of the 2011 United Kingdom census and the Census of Ireland 2011 found 53 people with the surname Bong on the island of Great Britain and one on the island of Ireland. In the 1881 United Kingdom census there were five bearers of the surname. The 2010 United States census found 1,208 people with the surname Bong, making it the 21,599th-most-common surname in the country. This represented an increase from 1,051 people (22,783rd-most-common) in the 2000 census. In the 2010 census, roughly 44% of the bearers of the surname identified as Asian (up from 36% in the 2000 census), and 50% as non-Hispanic white (down from 58% in the 2000 census).

== People ==
=== Chinese surnames ===
- Bong Swan An (1931–2018), Chinese-Indonesian entrepreneur
- Bong Kee Chok (1937–2023), Malaysian political activist
- Diana Bong (born 1985), Malaysian wushu taolu coach

=== Korean surnames ===
- Deposed Crown Princess Bong fl. 1429–1436), concubine of Munjong of Joseon
- Bong Chang-won (born 1938), South Korean wrestler
- Bong Joon-ho (born 1969), South Korean film director and screenwriter
- Bong Man-dae (born 1970), South Korean film director
- Jung Bong (born 1980), South Korean baseball player
- Bong Tae-gyu (born 1981), South Korean actor
- Bong Jae-hyun (born 1999), South Korean singer and actor, member of boy band Golden Child

=== Other ===
- Ngundeng Bong (c. 1830–1890), Sudanese Nuer prophet
- Harry Bong (1905–1987), Swedish Navy officer
- Richard Bong (1920–1945), United States Army Air Forces major
- Melanie Bong (born 1968), German jazz singer
- Josh Abercrombie (born 1984), American wrestler
- Frédéric Bong (born 1987), Cameroonian football player
- Gaëtan Bong (born 1988), Cameroonian football player
- Tobias Bong (born 1988), German former canoeist
- Valentino Bong (born 1989), Malaysian squash player

== Fictional characters ==
- Doctor Bong, an American comic book character introduced in 1977
- Bong Dal-hee, the title character of the 2007 South Korean television series Surgeon Bong Dal-hee
