= Vienna Art Orchestra =

European jazz group

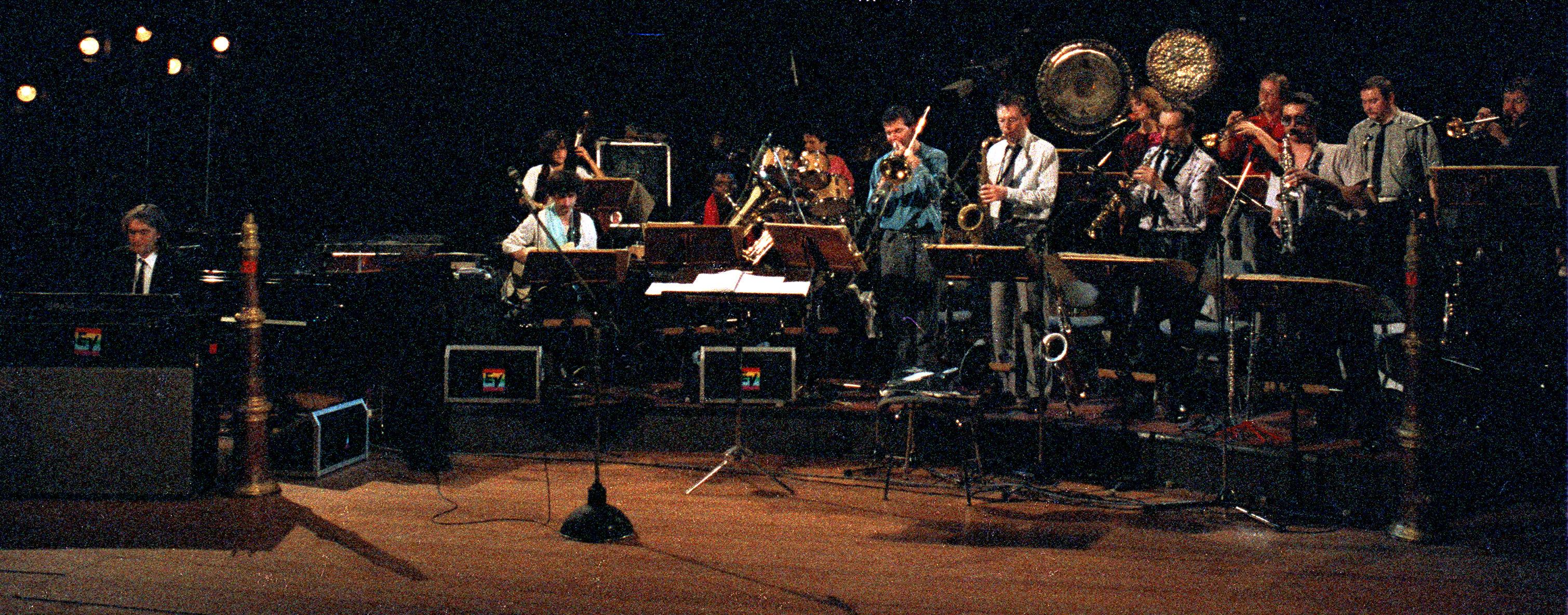
- Vienna Art Orchestra, Hamburg, 1985

Background information
- Origin: Vienna, Austria
- Genres: Jazz
- Years active: 1977–2010
- Labels: Extraplatte, hat ART, Amiga, Moers Music, Amadeo, Quinton, Verve, Art
- Past members: Thomas Alkier; Robert Bachner; Juraj Bartos; Walter Bosshardt; Florian Bramböck; Georg Breinschmid; Alegre Corrêa; Klaus Dickbauer; Joris Dudli; Urszula Dudziak; Karl Fian; Sebastian Fuchsberg; Thomas Gansch; Mario Gonzi; Nico Gori; Herwig Gradischnig; Herbert Joos; Heiri Känzig; Martin Koller; Thomas Lang; Anna Lauvergnac; Ronny Matky; Jojo Mayer; Adrian Mears; Matthieu Michel; Christian Muthspiel; Lauren Newton; Ingrid Oberkanins; Ed Partyka; Harry Pepl; Werner Pirchner; Dominique Pifarély; Wolfgang Puschnig; Christian Radovan; Joris Roelofs; Mathias Rüegg; Jon Sass; Woody Schabata; Uli Scherer; Andy Scherrer; Arkady Shilkloper; Roman Schwaller; Harry Sokal; Dominik Stöger; Hans Strasser; Hans Theessink; Tobias Weidinger; Jürgen Wuchner; Stephan Zimmermann
- Website: www.vao.at

The Vienna Art Orchestra was a European jazz group based in Vienna, Austria. Organized at different times as either a big band or as a smaller combo, it was regarded as one of the leading European jazz ensembles and was an official cultural ambassador of the Republic of Austria.

== History ==
Founded in 1977 by director and composer Mathias Rüegg, the band started out by performing Rüegg's postmodern compositions on stages throughout Europe. Among the founding musicians were singer Lauren Newton, saxophonists Wolfgang Puschnig and Harry Sokal, trombone player Christian Radovan, tuba player Jon Sass, and mallet percussionist Woody Schabata. In 1980, the ensemble signed a recording contract with the Swiss hatART label, and in 1984 they toured the United States for the first time.

The group essentially disbanded for a brief period at the end of the 1980s. In 1992, the VAO opened a new phase with a smaller complement of musicians. The band played fewer of Rüegg's compositions and concentrated on arrangements of works by Duke Ellington, Charles Mingus, and other noted American jazz composers, as well as music inspired by the classical music of Verdi, Wagner, Schubert, and Erik Satie.

In 1997, the ensemble's personnel changed once again, increasing in size and adding younger musicians. New compositions by Rüegg became a regular feature of VAO concerts, which often included visual and dramatic elements.

The Vienna Art Orchestra has performed more than 800 concerts and released more than 35 recordings. The film An Echo from Europe: Vienna Art Orchestra on Tour by Othmar Schmiderer was released in 1998.

The ensemble was nominated for an Amadeus Austrian Music Award in 2001 for the album All That Strauss, and again in 2003 for Art and Fun.

On July 10, 2010, Mathias Rüegg announced that the Vienna Art Orchestra had been disbanded for financial reasons.

== Discography ==
=== Vienna Art Orchestra ===
Album	Label	Year
Jessas Na!	Extraplatte EXS 15 (Single)	1977
Tango from Obango	Extraplatte EX 10 (LP)	1979
Concerto Piccolo	hat ART 6038 (CD)	1981
Suite for the Green Eighties	hat ART 6054 (CD)	1982
From No Time to Rag Time	hat ART 6073 (CD)	1983
The Minimalism of Erik Satie	hat ART 6024 (CD)	1984
A Notion in Perpetual Motion	hat ART 6096 (CD)	1985
Jazzbühne Berlin 85	Amiga Jazz 856 16816 10M (LP)	1986
Nightride of a Lonely Saxophoneplayer	Moers Music 02054/5 (2 CD)	1986
Inside Out	Moers Music 02062/3 (2 CD)	1987
Two Little Animals	Moers Music 02066 (CD)	1988
Blues for Brahms	amadeo 839 105-2 (2 CD)	1989
Innocence of Clichés	amadeo 841 646-2 (2 CD)	1990
Chapter II	amadeo 849 066-2 (CD)	1991
The Highlights 77-89 Live in Vienna	amadeo 513 325-2 (2 CD)	1992
standing... WHAT?	amadeo 519 816-2 (CD)	1993
The Original Charts of Duke Ellington & Charles Mingus	Verve 521 998-2 (CD)	1994
European Songbook	Verve 527 672-2 (CD)	1995
Vienna Art Orchestra 20th Anniversary:	Verve 537 095-2 (3 CD)	1997
1) Powerful Ways: Nine Immortal NonEvergreens for Eric Dolphy	Verve 537 096-2
2) Quiet Ways: Ballads	Verve 537 097-2
3) Unexpected Ways: M Concerto for Voice & Silence	Verve 537 098-2
Tango from Obango (special ed. with bonus CD):	Extraplatte EX 10-2 (3 CD)	1997
1) Tango from Obango	Extraplatte EX 010 097-2 A
2) Two Songs for Another Lovely War / Jessas Na!	Extraplatte EX 010 097-2 B
American Rhapsody	RCA Victor 0902663-227-2	1998
Duke Ellington's Sound Of Love	TCB 99802	1999
All That Strauss	TCB 20052	2000
Artistry in Rhythm	TCB 01102	2000
A Centenary Journey	Quinton Q0104	2001
ART & FUN	Universal Music Emarcy 017 072-2	2002
Duke Ellington’s Sound of Love Vol. 2	Universal Music Emarcy 0602498654194	2003
Big Band Poesie	Universal Music Emarcy 986771-0	2004
Swing & Affairs	Universal Music Emarcy 9874469	2005
3	Universal Music 06025 172 287-9 5	2007
All That Strauss Vol. 2	Art Records 1002	2007
Third Dream	Extraplatte Extraplatte EX 998-2	2009
Third Dream - Limited Edition	VAO-Shop Extraplatte EX 999-2	2009

=== Vienna Art Special ===
Album	Label	Year
Serapionmusic	Moers Music 02050 (LP)	1986
Two Songs for Another Lovely War	Extraplatte, EX ED 001 (LP)	1988
Swiss Art Orchestra	MGB 9201 (CD)	1992
Fe & Males	amadeo 513 328-2 (CD)	1992
Plays for Jean Cocteau	Verve 529 290-2 (CD)	1996

=== Vienna Art Choir ===
Album	Label	Year
From No Art to Mo-(z)-Art	Moers Music 02002 (CD)	1983
Five Old Songs	Moers Music 02036 (CD)	1985
Swiss Swing	Moers Music 02060 (CD)	1987

=== Vienna Art Orchestra with Ernst Jandl ===
Album	Label	Year
bist eulen?	Extraplatte EX 316 141 (CD)	1984
vom vom zum zum	Extraplatte EX 316 145 (CD)	1988
lieber ein saxophon	Extraplatte EX 316 153 (CD)	1991

== See also ==
- List of experimental big bands
