= Linda Sharrock =

American jazz singer

Linda Sharrock (also Lynda Sharrock) (born Linda Chambers, April 2, 1947, Philadelphia, Pennsylvania) is an American jazz singer.

== Career ==
Sharrock sang in church choirs as a child. Interested in both folk music and jazz, she studied art while in college and became interested in avant garde music. She performed with Pharoah Sanders in the mid-1960s; late in 1966 she married Sonny Sharrock and began using the spelling Lynda professionally. She worked with him and Sanders into the early 1970s, as well as with Herbie Mann (1969–70). One of her best-known performances is on the 1969 Sonny Sharrock album Black Woman, released on Vortex Records. She toured Istanbul in 1973 and recorded with Joe Bonner in 1974. She divorced Sharrock in 1978 and returned to using "Linda", though she kept his surname. She moved to Vienna, where she worked with Franz Koglmann, Eric Watson, and Wolfgang Puschnig well into the 1990s. She worked with ensembles such as the Pat Brothers, Red Sun, Zenit, and AM4 in the 1980s, and with Harry Pepl in 1992.

After suffering a stroke in 2009 which left her partially disabled and aphasic, she briefly withdrew from the scene before returning in 2012. Since then she has appeared and recorded in France, Austria, the United Kingdom, the Netherlands, Slovenia, with various ensembles under the Linda Sharrock Network label.

== Discography ==
Solo

- On Holiday (Polydor, 1990)
- Like A River (Amadeo, 1994)
- Confessions (Quinton, 2004)

The Linda Sharrock Network

- Linda Sharrock; Itaru Oki; Mario Rechtern; Eric Zinman; Makoto Sato; Yoram Rosilio (). No Is No (Don't Fuck Around With Your Women) (Improvising Beings, 2014)
- Linda Sharrock; (In) The Abyssity of the Grounds. Gods. (Golden Lab, 2015)
- The Linda Sharrock Network: Linda Sharrock, Itaru Oki, Mario Rechtern, Eric Zinman, Makoto Sato, Claude Parle, Cyprien Busolini, Makoto Sato, Charlie Collins, John Jasnoch, Derek Saw (Improvising Beings, 2016). They Begin to Speak.

With Sonny Sharrock

- Black Woman (Vortex, 1969)
- Monkey-Pockie-Boo (BYG Actuel, 1970)
- Paradise (Atco 1975)

With others

- Joe Bonner - Angel Eyes (Muse, 1976)
- Am 4 (1989). ...and She Answered. ECM 839620.
- Linda Sharrock & The Three Man Band (1991). Linda Sharrock & The Three Man Band. Moers.
- SamulNori (1993). Red Sun. Polygram 841222.
- Puschnig, Wolfgang (1995). Then Comes the White Tiger. ECM/BMG 21499.
- Various Artists (1996). West End. Samsung 105.
- Linda Sharrock; Eric Watson (2007). Listen to the Night. Sunnyside 283525.
