= Feng Prefecture =

Feng Prefecture may refer to:

- Feng Prefecture (modern Shaanxi), a prefecture between the 6th and 14th centuries in modern Shaanxi and Gansu, China
- Feng Prefecture (modern Guangdong), a prefecture between the 6th and 14th centuries in modern Guangdong and Guangxi, China
- Fengzhou Prefecture (Liao dynasty) 豐州, the name of a Liao dynasty prefecture just east of the modern city of Hohhot in Inner Mongolia

== See also ==
- Feng (disambiguation)
