= Feng =

Feng may refer to:

- List of surnames written Feng, several Chinese surnames as transliterated from Mandarin
  - Féng (surname) (冯 féng 2nd tone "gallop"), very common Chinese surname
  - Fèng (surname) (鳳 fèng 4th tone "phoenix"), relatively common Chinese family name
  - Fēng (surname 封) (fēng 1st tone)
  - Feng (surname meaning wind) (風 fēng 1st tone "wind"), rare Chinese surname
  - Fèng (wikt:奉 fèng 4th tone "offer"), rare Chinese surname
- Feng (chieftain), legendary Jutish chieftain and the prototype for William Shakespeare's King Claudius
- Feng (rapper), English rapper
- FEng, Fellow of Royal Academy of Engineering
- Fengjing, the former capital of the duchy of Zhou during the late Shang dynasty
- Feng County, Shaanxi, in China
- Feng County, Jiangsu, in China
- Fenghuang, mythological birds of East Asia
- Feng (mythology), Chinese legendary creature that resembles a lump of meat and regenerates after being eaten
- Feng Office (web application), open source team collaboration software
- The sound ʩ is encoded in Unicode as "Feng Digraph."
