= Concerto Piccolo =

Live album by Vienna Art Orchestra
- Released: 1981
- Recorded: October 31, 1980
- Venues: Jazz Festival Zürich, Switzerland.
- Genres: Contemporary classical music, Jazz
- Length: 64:33
- Labels: Hat ART hat ART 1980/81
- Producers: Werner X. Uehlinger, Pia Uehlinger

Vienna Art Orchestra chronology
Tango from Obango (1980)	Concerto Piccolo (1981)	Suite for the Green Eighties (1982)

Concerto Piccolo is a live album by European jazz group the Vienna Art Orchestra recorded at the Zürich Jazz Festival in 1980 and released on the Hat ART label.

== Reception ==
Professional ratings
Review scores
Source	Rating
Allmusic	5/5 stars

The Allmusic review stated: "Recorded live at the Zurich Jazz Festival in 1980, this was America's first taste of the wild abandon that is the Vienna Art Orchestra and expatriate Lauren Newton's glorious vocal instrument. This is a 13-piece big band led by the beautifully weird compositional, instructional, and arranging craziness of Mathias Rüegg. They trash and revere all traditions -- both historical and avant-garde at the same time -- while using them both along with carnival and circus music, classical forms and fugues, and French salon music. ... There are colors, harmonies, and polyphonal systems at work here that will be recalled as the glory years of Euro big-band jazz in the future, and the evocative timbral nature of Rüegg's compositions will be studied for decades to come. Truly, Concerto Piccolo is an amazing debut from a band that offers more than it could possibly receive".

== Track listing ==
All compositions by Mathias Rüegg except where noted

1. "Concerto Piccolo" – 15:25
2. "Herzogstrasse 4" – 11:30
3. "Jelly Roll, But Mingus Rolls Better" (Charles Mingus/Mathias Rüegg) – 12:45
4. "Variations on "Am Hermineli Z'liab" – 12:25
5. "Tango from Obango" – 12:20

== Personnel ==
- Mathias Rüegg − arranger, conductor
- Lauren Newton - voice
- Karl Fian − trumpet
- Herbert Joos − flugelhorn, baritone horn, alphorn, double trumpet
- Christian Radovan − trombone
- Billy Fuchs − tuba
- Harry Sokal − soprano saxophone, tenor saxophone, flute
- Wolfgang Puschnig − alto saxophone, flute, piccolo
- Roman Schwaller − tenor saxophone, clarinet
- Uli Scherer − piano, Fender piano
- Stefan Bauer - vibraphone
- Jürgen Wuchner − bass
- Wolfgang Reisinger - percussion
- Joris Dudli - drums
