= Suite for the Green Eighties =

Live album by Vienna Art Orchestra
- Released: 1982
- Recorded: June 15 and October 28, 29 & 30, 1981
- Venue: Thalwil Gemeindehaussaal, Bern Restaurant Schweizerbund, Geneve New Morning and Zürich Bazillus in Switzerland
- Genre: Contemporary classical music, Jazz
- Length: 78:58
- Label: Hat ART; Hat Art 1991/92
- Producer: Werner X. Uehlinger, Pia Uehlinger

Vienna Art Orchestra chronology
Concerto Piccolo (1981)	Suite for the Green Eighties (1982)	From No Time to Rag Time (1983)

Suite for the Green Eighties is an album by European jazz group the Vienna Art Orchestra which was first released in 1982 on the Hat ART label.

== Reception ==
Professional ratings
Review scores
Source	Rating
Allmusic	4/5 stars

The Allmusic review stated: "The five-part work is a crosshatch of jazz, blues, circus music, postmodern harmonic and intervallic invention, and dance music (as in ballet). The temptation to call it a pastiche is too easy to drape over this mammoth construction of color and texture in sound. Before this suite begins — and it is actually more like a symphony than a jazz suite — there are three Rüegg compositions that set the audience up for the drama.… When the "Suite" finally begins, listeners are almost taken off guard since it sounds like a coda. Before the vibes and trumpets go into a dance of intricate counterpoint, the band plays "fliessend," smoothly and evenly, and the movement becomes almost contemplative, with the exception of the two contrapuntal instruments now playing in restrained tones. As the bop horn lines state the theme for the rest of the suite, short, choppy interludes of dissonance and even sets of quiet tone rows are inserted into the melody! Rüegg's harmonic sensibility is so developed that he has no difficulties in traversing isorhythms to get to his desired place. By the time the last movement is reached, one would swear that all elegiac notions have been left behind in order to join Buddy Rich and Count Basie in a Kansas City block party. Swinging brass, jump-start rhythms, and angular solos carry the joyous suite to its impossible ending — in the quiet of the evening with only the feeling that something new is possible for the first time in a long, long while".

== Track listing ==
All compositions by Mathias Rüegg

1. "Haluk" − 14:12
2. "Plädoyer for Sir Mayor Moll" − 6:22
3. "Nanan N'z Gang" − 11:28
4. "Blue for Two" − 8:55 Omitted from CD reissue
5. "Suite for the Green Eighties Part I" − 11:39
6. "Suite for the Green Eighties Part II" − 4:17
7. "Suite for the Green Eighties Part III" − 8:02
8. "Suite for the Green Eighties Part IV" − 8:12
9. "Suite for the Green Eighties Part V" − 5:51

== Personnel ==
- Mathias Rüegg - arranger, conductor
- Karl Fian - trumpet
- Herbert Joos − flugelhorn, baritone horn, double trumpet, alphorn
- Christian Radovan − trombone
- Billy Fuchs − tuba
- Harry Sokal - soprano saxophone, tenor saxophone, flute
- Wolfgang Puschnig − alto saxophone, bass clarinet, flute, piccolo
- Ingo Morgana − tenor saxophone
- Uli Scherer − piano, melodica
- Woody Schabata − marimba, tabla, vibraphone
- Jürgen Wuchner − bass
- Wolfgang Reisinger − drums, gongs, percussion
- Stefanski − drums, percussion
- Lauren Newton - voice
