= Melanie Bong =

German jazz singer

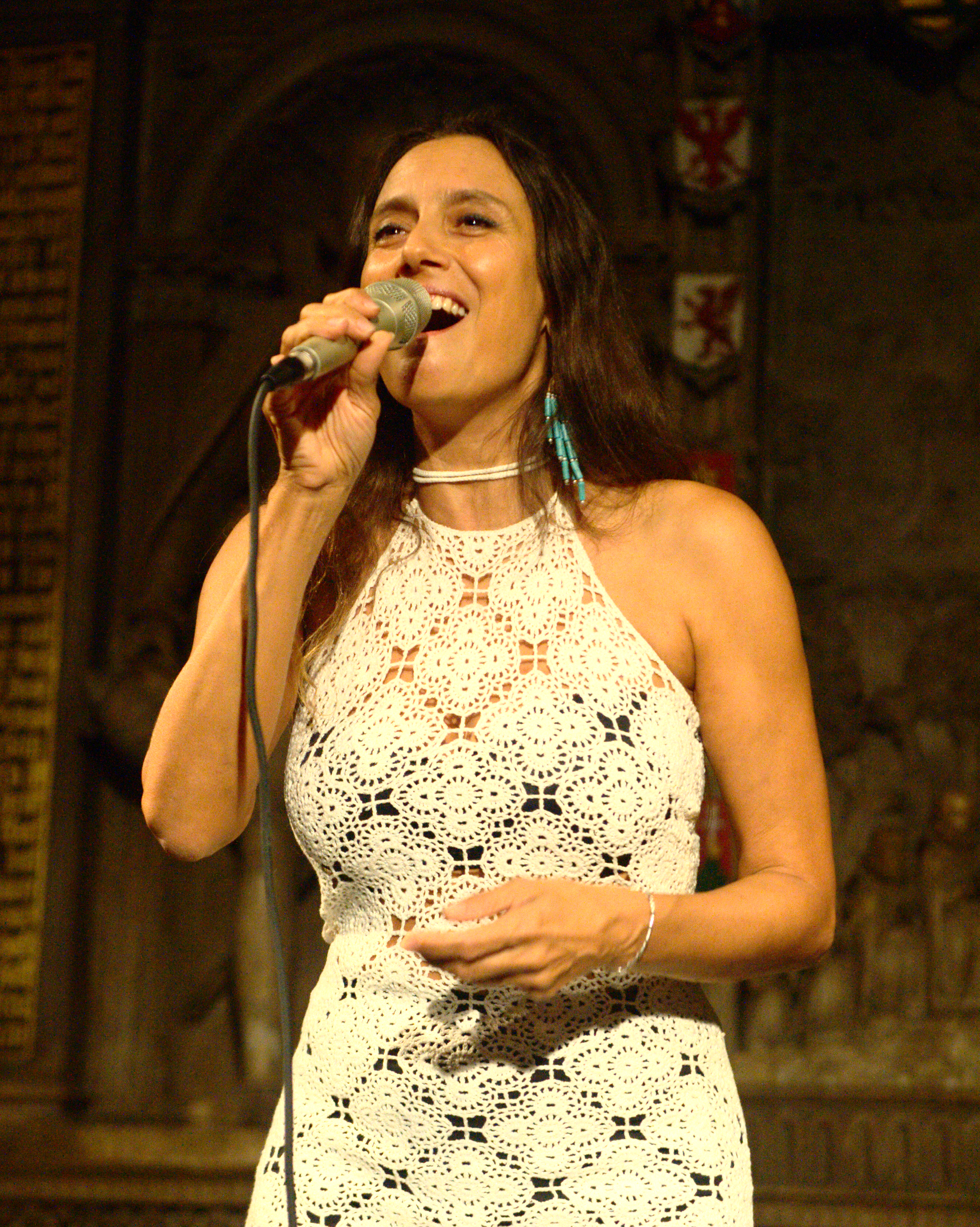
- Melanie Bong in the Stadtkirche Darmstadt in 2017

Background information
- Born: 6 June 1968 (age 56); Munich
- Genres: Jazz
- Occupation: Singer
- Website: melanieninibong.com

Melanie Bong (born 6 June 1968) is a German jazz singer.

She studied at the University of Music and Performing Arts, Graz under Sheila Jordan, Mark Murphy and Andy Bey. After the study visit in New York City, she started her own teaching activity at Anton Bruckner Private University for Music, Drama, and Dance. She was a member of Maximilian Geller Quintet.

As a member of the quintet, she released several albums and toured France with Memorial Orchestra under Bob Lanese. In 2002 she produced her debut album. She sings in her band and in Fernando Correa's Caminhos Cruzados.

== Discography ==
- Fantásia (2002) with Johannes Enders, Fernando Correa, Martin Woess, Adelhard Roidinger, Gregor Hilbe, Ernst Grieshofer, Maurizio Nobill)
- Gypsy Dream (2005) with Johannes Enders, Fritz Pauer, Christian Diener, Rick Hollander, Nini Mureskic
