= Phung River =

Phung River may refer to several rivers in Thailand:

- Lam Nam Phung (ลำน้ำพุง), a feeder of Nong Han Lake in Sakon Nakhon Province
- Nam Mae Phung (น้ำแม่พุง), a tributary of the Ing River in Chiang Rai Province
- Huai Nam Phung (ห้วยพุง), a tributary of the Pa Sak River in Loei and Phetchabun Provinces
