= Feng Xinduo =

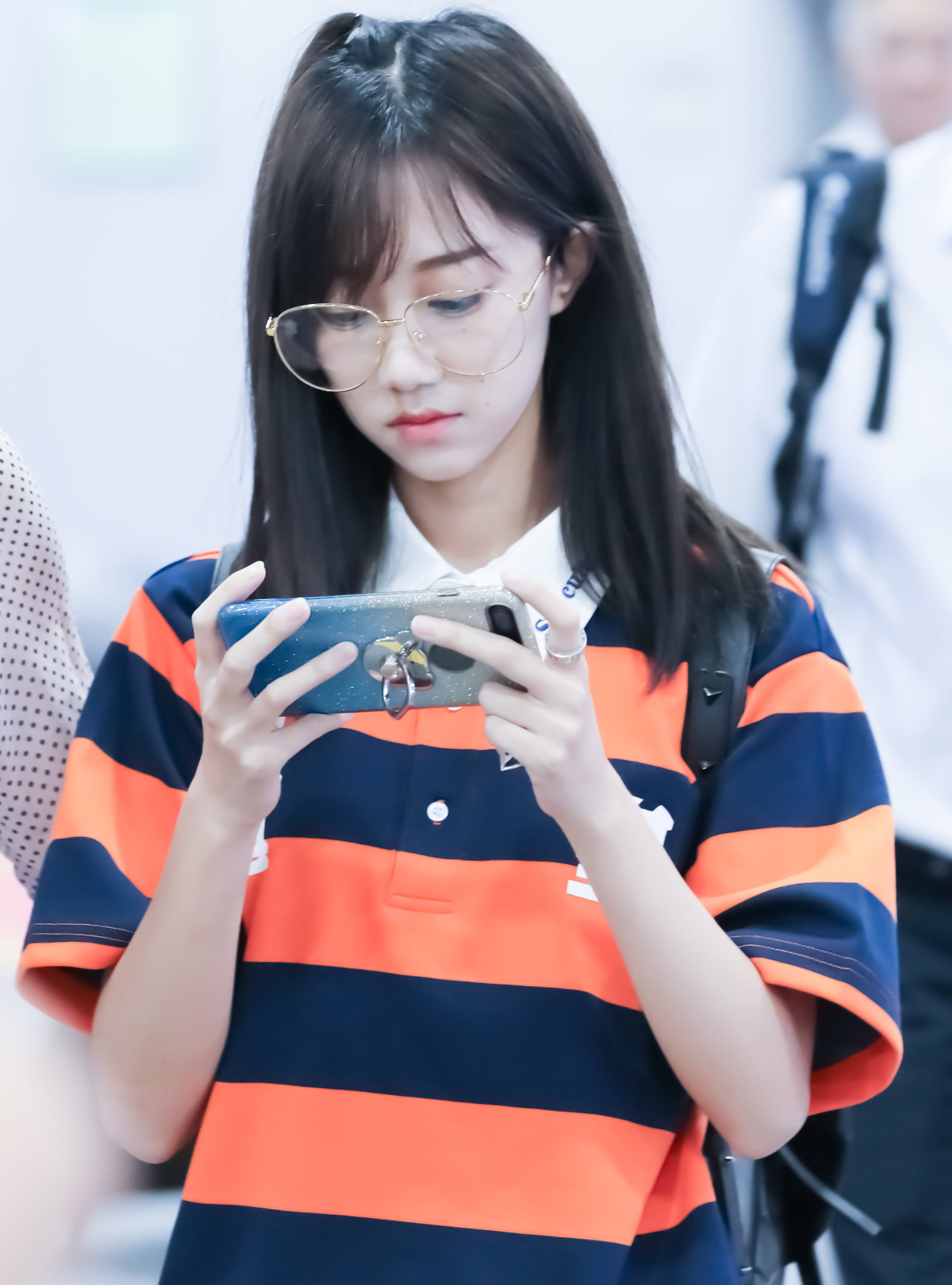
- Born: January 24, 1992 (age 34); Dalian, Liaoning, China
- Education: Jilin College of the Arts
- Occupations: Singer, actress, idol, entertainer
- Years active: 2013-present

Chinese name
- Traditional Chinese: 馮薪朵
- Simplified Chinese: 冯薪朵
Transcriptions
Standard Mandarin
- Hanyu Pinyin: Féng Xīnduǒ
- Musical career
- Origin: China
- Genres: Pop, Mandopop
- Instrument: Vocals
- Labels: Star48; Ninestyle Model Agency; Ninestyle Music

Feng Xinduo (simplified Chinese: 冯薪朵; traditional Chinese: 馮薪朵; pinyin: Féng Xīnduǒ; born January 24, 1992, in Dalian, Liaoning, China) is a Chinese idol singer and a member of Chinese idol girl group SNH48. From February 13, 2015, to December 22, 2017, she served as the captain of Team NII.

== Career ==
On 18 August 2013, Feng was among the 34 shortlisted candidates for second-generation members of SNH48, and made her debut at Team NII's 1st Stage, "Theater no Megami" on 2 November. On 11 November, it was announced that Feng will be one of 24 members in Team NII during the team inauguration ceremony. On 16 November, she participated in SNH48's first major concert, "SNH48 Guangzhou Concert", held in the Guangzhou International Sports Arena.

On 18 January 2014, Feng participated in the Kouhaku Utagassen to commemorate SNH48's first anniversary. On July 26, she came in seventh for the Online Popularity Award during SNH48's first "General Election".

On 31 January 2015, on SNH48 Request Hour Setlist Best 30 2015, Feng's performance of "Enjou Rousen" with Li Yitong was ranked 10th. On 13 February, it was announced that she would be the captain of Team NII. On 25 July, Feng was ranked 12th in SNH48's second General Election with 22,028.7 votes,

On July 30, 2016, during SNH48's third General Election, Feng was ranked fifth with 88,598.8 votes.

On April 1, 2017, Feng became a regular cast member of variety show Brain Boom. On July 29, during SNH48's fourth General Election, Feng came in fourth with 133607.1 votes. On December 22, Feng resigned from her position as captain of Team NII in light of an internal conflict within the team involving member Li Yitong.

On July 28, 2018, Feng was ranked third with 174,020.18 votes during the fifth general election. This is the first time that she was named on Top3 of the whole SNH48 Group.

== Discography ==
=== With SNH48 ===
==== EPs ====
Year	No.	Title	Role	Notes
2013	3	Fortune Cookie of Love	B-side	Debut with SNH48 Team NII
2014	4	Heart Electric	B-side	
2014	5	UZA	B-side	
2015	6	Give Me Five!	B-side	
2015	7	After Rain	A-side	
2015	8	Manatsu no Sounds Good!	B-side	
2015	9	Halloween Night	A-side	Ranked 12th in the 2nd General election
2015	10	New Year's Bell	B-side	
2016	11	Engine of Youth	B-side	First original EP
2016	12	Dream Land	B-side	Second original EP
2016	13	Princess's Cloak	A-side	Ranked 5th in the 3rd General election Also sang on "Do It" with Team NII, center with Lu Ting
2016	14	Happy Wonder World	A-side	
2017	15	Each Other's Future	A-side	
2017	16	Summer Pirates	B-side	Sang on "Limited season" with Team NII
2017	17	Dawn in Naples	A-side	
2017	18	Sweet Festival	A-side	Also sang on "Good Luck" with SNH48

==== Albums ====
- Mae Shika Mukanee (2014)

== Units ==
=== SNH48 Stage Units ===
Stage No.	Song	Notes
Team NII 1st Stage "Theater no Megami"	Arashi no Yoru ni wa 暴风雨之夜	With Chen Jiaying, Lu Ting and Zhao Yue
Team NII 2nd Stage "Saka Agari"	End Roll 曲终人散	With Zhao Yue, Xu Yanyu and Gong Shiqi
Team NII 3rd Stage "Mokugekisha"	Enjou Rousen 燃烧的道路	With Ju Jingyi
Team NII 4th Stage "Boku no Taiyou"	Itoshisa no defense 爱到累了	With Ju Jingyi and Lu Ting
Team NII 5th Stage "Exclusive Party"	Black Swan 黑天鹅	With Chen Jiaying, Gong Shiqi and Lu Ting

=== Concert units ===
Year	Date	Name	Song	Notes
2013	16 November	Guangzhou Concert	None	
2014	18 January	Kouhaku Utagassen 2014	None	
2014	26 July	SNH48 Sousenkyo Concert in Shanghai	None	
2015	31 January	Request Hour Setlist Best 30 2015	Enjou Rousen 燃烧的道路	With Li Yitong
2015	25 July	2nd General Election Concert	None	
2015	26 December	Request Hour Setlist Best 30 2015 (2nd Edition)	Yokaze no Shiwaza 都是夜风惹的祸; Temodemo no Namida 爱恨的泪	Solo song With Lu Ting
2016	30 July	3rd General Election Concert	Don't Touch	With Lu Ting and Zhao Yue
2017	7 January	Request Hour Setlist Best 50 (3rd Edition)	Sakura no Hanabiratachi 青春的花瓣; Tonari no Banana 青涩的香; You Are the Next Stop 下一站是你	Solo song With Lu Ting; With Li Yitong

== Filmography ==
=== Variety shows ===
Year	Date	Channel	Title	Notes
2014	20 April	Star Chinese Channel	The Kids Are All Right 鸡蛋碰石头	
2014	4 July-10 October	Tudou, Youku	SNHello	
2015	25 January	Toonmax TV	炫动漫中国	
2015	3 April	Shanghai Television	左右时尚	
2015	3 April	PPTV	Live 大牌直播间	
2015	27 June	AcFun	Blossom Girls 周刊少女SNH48	
2015	10 July	Toonmax Television	学长驾到	With Li Yitong, Yi Jia'ai, Dong Yanyun, Zhang Yuxin and Zhao Yue
2015	13 July	KanKan News	语录	With Li Yitong, Zeng Yanfen and Yi Jia'ai
2015	28 July	QQLive	Running Mei 进击的女生	
2015	17 October	CCTV-15	Global Chinese Music Chart 全球中文音乐榜上榜	Won Top Idol Group
2015	31 October	Dragon Television	Tonight 80's Talk Show	
2015	12 November	Hunan Television	Laugh Out Loud 我们都爱笑	With Ju Jingyi and Lin Siyi
2016	14 January	ZhanQi TV	Super MC 最强星主播	
2016	16 January	Hunan Television	Crazy Magic 疯狂的麦咭	With Ju Jingyi, Lin Siyi and Zhao Yue
2016	17 January	Hunan Television	Mom Loves U 妈妈的牵挂	
2016	23 March	Hunan Television	I Am A Great Beauty 我是大美人	
2016	27 March, 17 April	Anhui Television	Super Show 超级大首映	
2016	10 September	Hunan Television	Happy Camp 快乐大本营	With Top 16
2017	2 March-20 April	Youku	One Of Us 胜利的游戏	
2017	1 April	Youku	Brain Boom 脑洞大开	
2017	10 May	Jiangsu Television	鲜厨当道	With Huang Tingting
2017	20 June	Youku	Super Idol 超次元偶像	With Huang Tingting and Lin Siyi
