= Maggie Feng =

American chess player (born 2000)

Personal information
- Born: July 11, 2000 (age 25) Dublin, Ohio

Chess career
- Country: United States
- Title: FIDE Master (2017); Woman International Master (2018)
- Peak rating: 2304 (July 2017)

Maggie Feng (born July 11, 2000) is an American chess player and a Woman International Master.

== Career ==
Feng started playing chess when she was 8 years old. In 2016, she made history by becoming the first girl to win the U.S. Junior High School Championship (K9 section) with a score of 6½/7. She competed in the U.S. Women's Chess Championship for the first time in 2017, where she tied for 4th place out of 12 with a score of 6/11 points. In 2018, she placed 8th with a score of 4½; and in 2019, she placed 9th with a score of 4.
