= Fèng (surname) =

Chinese family name

Fèng (鳳/凤)
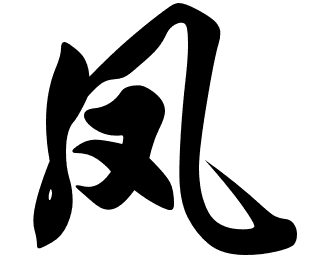
- Feng surname
- Language: Chinese

Origin
- Language: Old Chinese
- Derivation: Gaoxin
- Meaning: Fenghuang

Other names
- Derivative: Fung

Fèng (traditional Chinese: 鳳; simplified Chinese: 凤; lit. 'phoenix') is a relatively common Chinese surname. It is the 54th name on the Hundred Family Surnames poem. It has the same radical-frame with, and therefore appears similar to, a less common surname Feng ("wind" 風, simplified 风 with a flat first tone), but "phoenix" is pronounced with a falling fourth tone fèng.

== Origin of various Feng family ==
- Gaoxin family of ancient China period
- Ji (surname) of Zhou dynasty period
- Hui people the Arab people after Han dynasty period
- Feng (family name) (风) in the any dynasty period
- Public Office name of Tang dynasty period
- Khitan people of Liao dynasty period
- Mongolian the Donghu people in the any dynasty period

== See also ==
- Fang (surname)
- Bong (surname)
