= List of surnames written Feng =

Chinese family name

The surname Feng is a romanization of several Chinese surnames.

== Féng 馮 / 冯 ==
(wikt:馮 féng 2nd tone "gallop"), very common Chinese surname

== Fèng 鳳 / 凤 ==
(wikt:鳳 fèng 4th tone "phoenix"), relatively common Chinese family name

== Fēng 風 / 风 ==
(wikt:風 fēng 1st tone "wind"), rare Chinese surname

== Fèng 奉 ==
Fèng (奉)
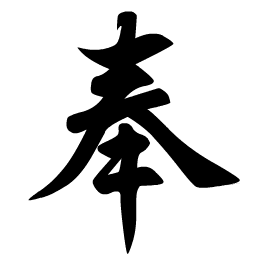
- Fèng surname
- Language: Chinese

Fèng (wikt:奉 4th tone "offering") is a rare Chinese surname. In Cantonese Fung, in Middle Chinese Bong. origin of;

- in Shaanxi the Qin (state), the Citizen of Yíng (嬴) get surname Fèng (奉)
- in Shandong the Qi (state), Jiang (姜) family get surname Fèng (奉)
- in Zhejiang the Yue (state), Yue people (越族) get surname Fèng (奉)

== Fēng 封 ==
Fēng 封
- Fēng surname
- Language: Chinese

Fēng (wikt:封 1st tone) is a Chinese family name. It is No.208 in the Baijiaxing, and 257 in the modern census, called the "New Baijiaxing".

== Fēng 豐 / 丰 ==
Fēng (wikt:豐) is the 392nd surname in the Baijiaxing.

== Fēng 酆 ==
Fēng (wikt:酆) is the 61st surname in the Baijiaxing.
