= Harry Pepl =

- Born: 10 September 1945; Wien
- Origin: Austria
- Died: 5 December 2005 (aged 60) Wiener Neustadt, Niederösterreich
- Occupations: Musician, composer
- Instrument: Guitar
- Years active: 1965–2005
- Labels: col legno
- Website: www.harrypepl.com

Harry Pepl (10 September 1945 – 5 December 2005) was an Austrian jazz guitarist and composer born in Wien.

== Biography ==
Pepl studied classical guitar at the Universität für Musik und darstellende Kunst Wien. He oriented his musical preference to Jazz and together with Werner Pirchner first appeared as "Pirchner-Pepl-JazzZwio", which was partially expanded with Adelhard Roidinger as bassist for Trio. He also played with a series of famous jazz musicians, like Benny Goodman, Dave Holland, Enrico Rava, Wolfgang Puschnig, Steve Swallow, Jack DeJohnette, and Michel Portal, as well as the Vienna Art Orchestra. With Mike Richmond he played between 1984 and 1986 at numerous festivals.

Between 1977 and 1995 he taught guitar at the Universität für Musik und darstellende Kunst Graz, from 1984 as professor. Pepl died on 5 December 2005 in a hospital in Wiener Neustadt, Niederösterreich.

== Discography ==
=== Solo albums ===
- 1990: Schönberg Improvations (EmArcy Records)
- 1994: N.Y.C. Impressure (Extraplatte), with Harry Pepl Quartet
- 1996: Flow (PAO Records)
- 2003: Live At Miles Smiles (EmArcy Records), with Werner Pirchner and Georg Polanski

=== Collaborations ===
- 1976: Leave Me (WM Produktion), with ORF Big Band Conducted By Richard Österreicher - Soloist: Harry Pepl
- 1979: Tango from Obango (Art), with the Vienna Art Orchestra
- 1980: Gegenwind (Mood Records), with Pirchner-Pepl-Jazzzwio
- 1980: Austria Drei (EGO Records), with Werner Pirchner, Todd Canedy, and Adelhard Roidinger
- 1980: Berlin 1980 (TCB Records), with Benny Goodman
- 1981: Live, Montreux '81 (Wea Music), with Pirchner-Pepl-Jazzzwio
- 1982: Schattseite, (ECM Records), with Adelhard Roidinger, Heinz Sauer, W. Pirchner, and Michael Di Pasqua
- 1983: Werner Pirchner, Harry Pepl, Jack DeJohnette (ECM Records)
- 1988: Cracked Mirrors with Herbert Joos and Jon Christensen (ECM Records)
- 1994: Beginnings - Abstract Truth (AMADEO)
- 2008: Live In Concerts (EmArcy Records), with Jazzzwio
- 2009: Live in Concert Montreux 1981, Innsbruck 1984 (Universal Music), with Jazzzwio (CD + DVD)

== Lexicographical entries ==
- Wolf Kampmann: Reclams Jazzlexikon Stuttgart 2003; ISBN 3-15-010528-5
