= Burg Haimburg =

Castle in Austria

Coordinates: 46°41′33″N 14°40′13″E

Haimburg Castle
- Carinthia, Austria
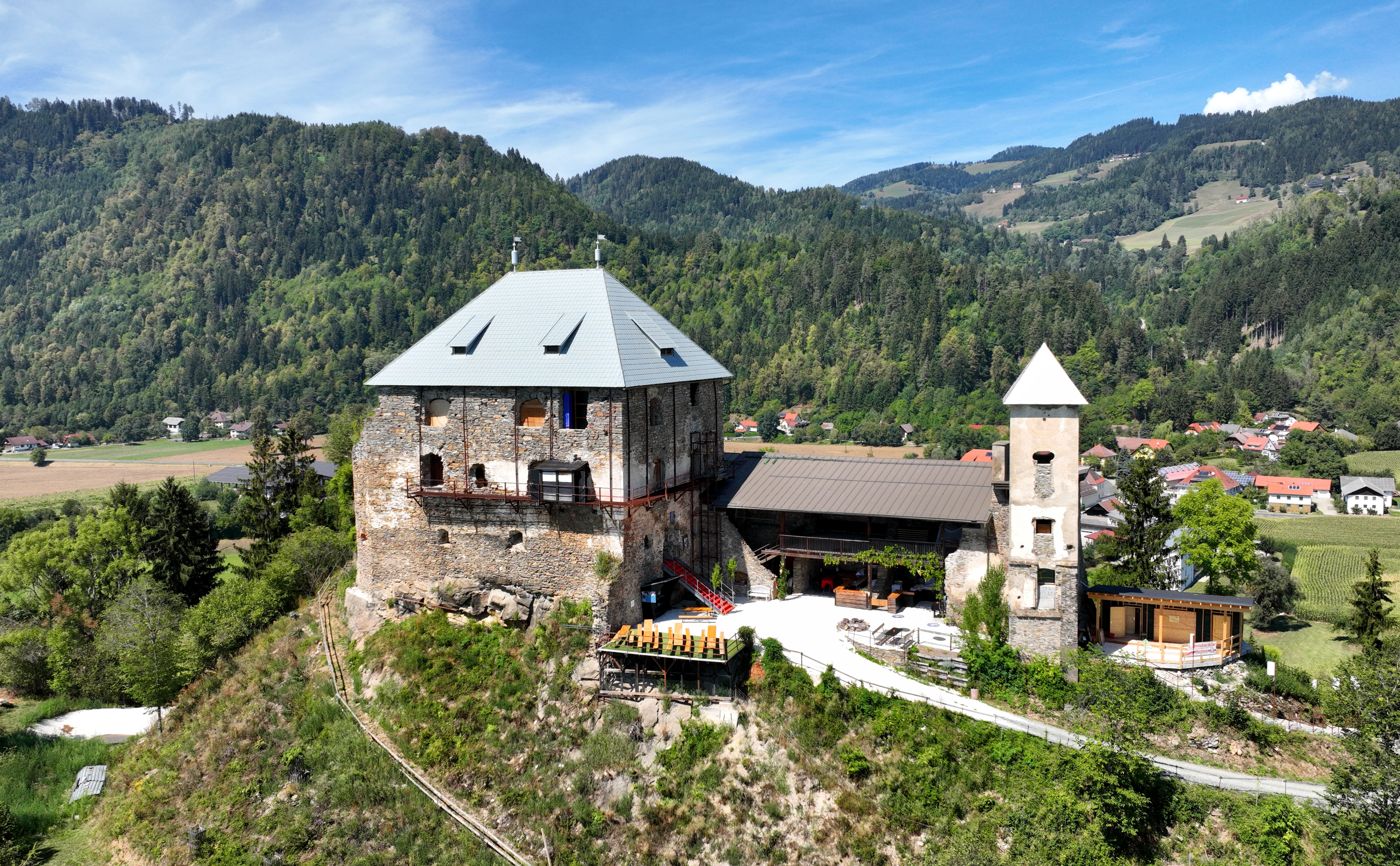
- Southeast view of Haimburg Castle

Site information
- Type: Rock castle

Site history
- Built: around 1070 to 1103

Haimburg Castle (Burg Haimburg), also called Heunburg, is a rock castle located in the village of Haimburg near the town of Völkermarkt in the Carinthia, Austria.

== History ==
The castle was first attested in 1103 as Huneburch. The Counts of Heunburg have been known in Carinthia since 1070, but died out in the male line in 1322.

The estate’s heirs were the Counts of Pfannberg, whose last representative, Johann, died in 1362. The castle passed to the Counts of Gorizia, and then to the Habsburgs in 1460 after the Peace of Pusarnitz.

Starting in 1990, the privately owned castle was repaired by the Rettet die Heunburg. Theater performances by the Theater k.l.a.s. were produced from 1995 to 2009. Since 2011, the Heunburg Theater has performed in the castle during the summer months.

== See also ==
- List of castles in Austria
