= Thomas Gansch =

Austrian trumpet player

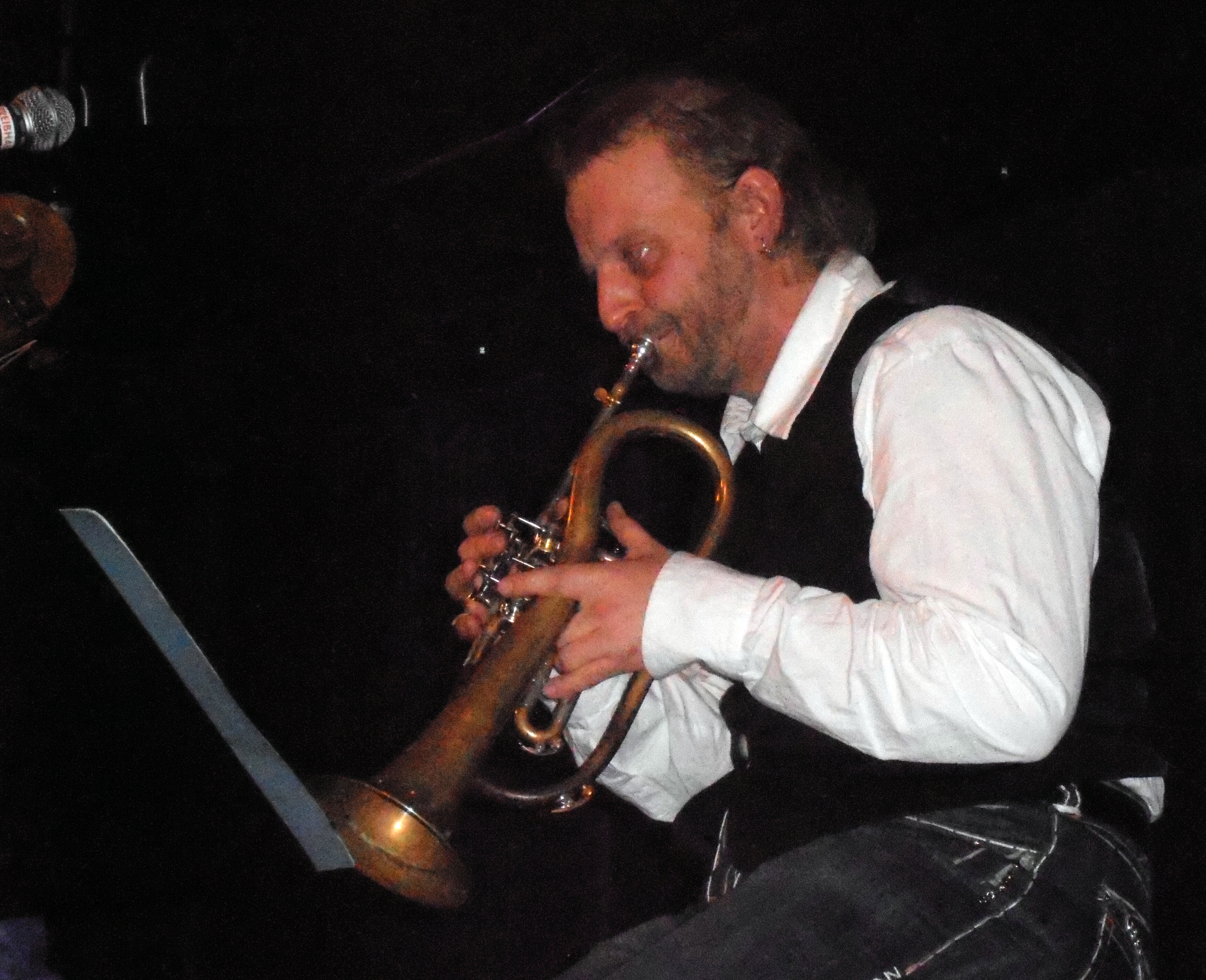
Thomas Gansch (concert with Georg Breinschmid, Treibhaus Innsbruck)

Thomas Gansch (born 31 December 1975 in St. Pölten) is a well-known Vienna-based Austrian trumpet player. He began his studies at Vienna music school at the age of 15.

In 1992 the brass septet Mnozil Brass was founded, in which he has since played first trumpet. In 1999 he was invited to the Vienna Art Orchestra, a renowned European Big Band. Later, he founded his own "little big band", Gansch & Roses.

Thomas Gansch performs on an unusual looking trumpet of his own design, commonly referred to as the "Gansch Horn", a rotary-valve trumpet (commonly seen in European orchestras) on which the valve section has been reconfigured so that the player holds the instrument in the same orientation as a piston-valve trumpet (commonly seen in jazz bands). The instrument is made by the Austrian manufacturer Schagerl. Gansch uses this with a Bach 3B megatone trumpet mouthpiece.

== Family ==
He grew up in a musical family:

- His father Johann Gansch was a renowned Austrian composer and pedagogue for brass music instruments. He was called the "marching king".
- His older brother Hans Gansch (born 1953) is a trumpet soloist and professor of trumpet studies at the Salzburg Mozarteum, and was principal trumpeter in the Vienna Philharmonic Orchestra from 1982 to 1996.
