= Christian Muthspiel =

Austrian composer, trombonist, and pianist

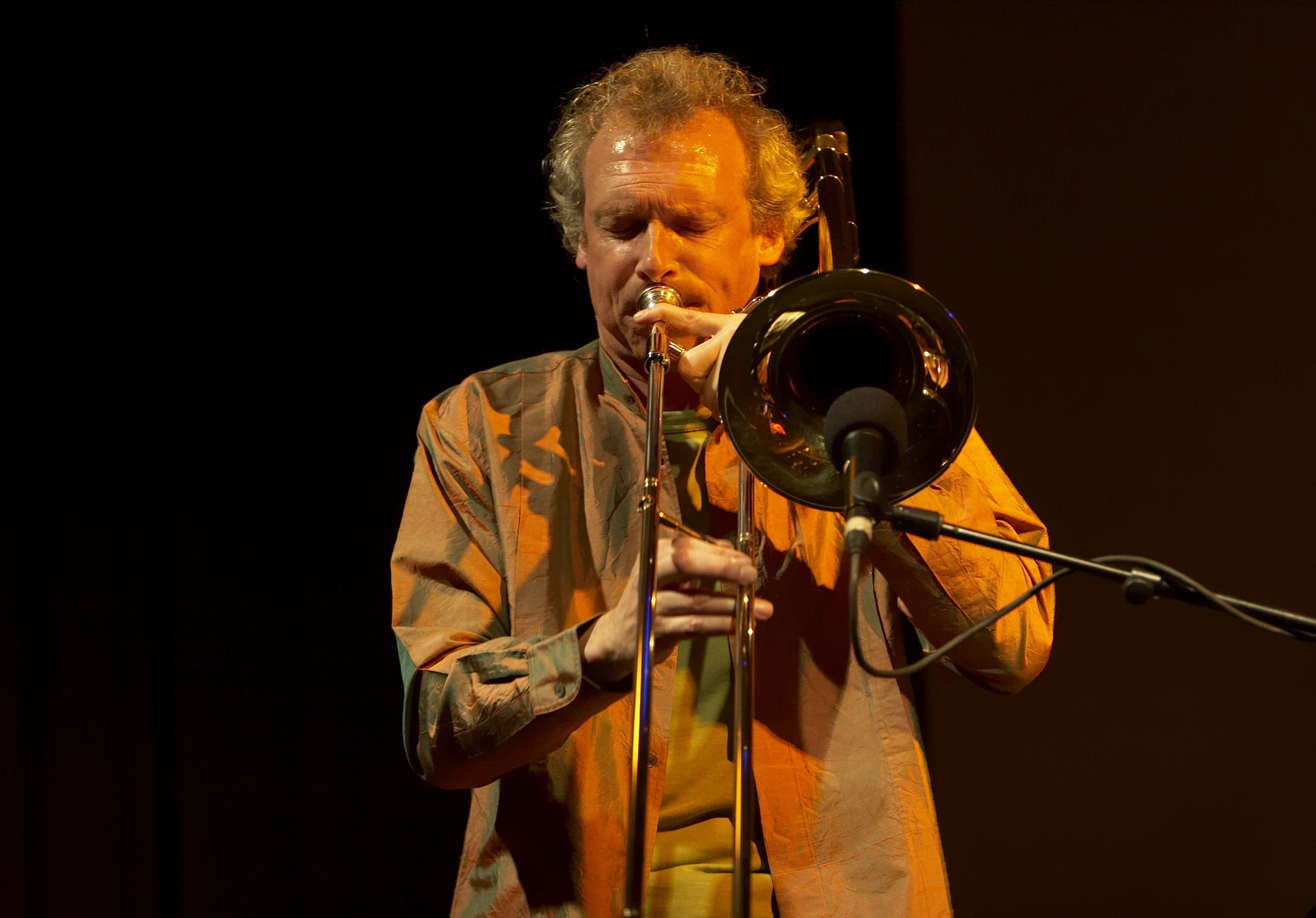

Background information
- Born: 1962 (age 63–64); Judenburg, Austria
- Genres: Jazz
- Occupations: Musician, composer
- Instruments: Trombone, piano

Christian Muthspiel (born 1962 in Judenburg, Austria) is an Austrian composer, trombonist, and pianist most associated with jazz.

He started with the piano at six and began study of the trombone at 11. From 1987 to 1988 he had a scholarship to study in Banff, Alberta. He also performs new classical music. His brother is jazz guitarist Wolfgang Muthspiel.
