= Herbert Joos =

German trumpeter

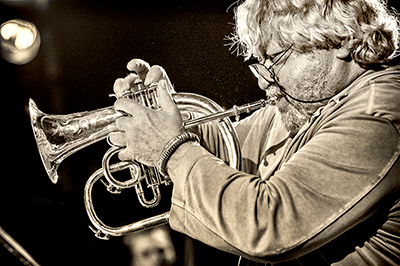
- Joos in 2014

Background information
- Born: 21 March 1940; Karlsruhe, Republic of Baden, Germany
- Died: 7 December 2019 (aged 79); Baden-Baden, Baden-Württemberg, Germany
- Genres: Jazz
- Occupation: Musician
- Instrument(s): Trumpet, flugelhorn
- Years active: 1970–2000s

Herbert Joos ([ˈhɛʁbɛʁt ˈjoːs]; 21 March 1940 – 7 December 2019) was a German jazz trumpeter, flugelhornist, and graphic designer. He made recordings solo and in groups, especially with the Vienna Art Orchestra. In 2017, he received the Jazzpreis Baden-Württemberg for his life's work.

== Life and works ==
Born in Karlsruhe, Joos learned trumpet first by self-study and then by a private teacher. He studied double bass from 1958, but then turned to flugelhorn, baritone horn, mellophone, and alphorn. Since the mid-1960s, he has been a member of Modern Jazz quintet Karlsruhe, from which the group Fourmenonly was created (with Wilfried Eichhorn and Rudolf Theilmann). Afterward, he was a member of various modern and free jazz formations (with Bernd Konrad, Hans Koller, Adelhard Roidinger and Jürgen Wuchner among others). He played at festivals and in the Free Jazz Meeting Baden-Baden of the SWF at a flugelhorn workshop with Kenny Wheeler, Ian Carr, Harry Beckett and Ack van Rooyen and made a name for himself with his solo recording, The Philosophy of the Flugelhorn in 1973. He also led his own wind trio, quartet and orchestra. He achieved more recognition in the 1980s as a member of the Vienna Art Orchestra, which he influenced. Since the 1990s he has participated in the SüdPool project. He has appeared as a duo with Frank Kuruc as well as in Patrick Bebelaar's groups, for Michel Godard, Wolfgang Puschnig, Clemens Salesny and Peter Schindler. He also played with the Orchestre National de France.

In 2017, he was awarded the Jazzpreis Baden-Württemberg for his life's work. Instead of a speech after the laudations, he thanked in a short phrase, and played a concert with an orchestra of 16. He also produced drawings, book illustrations and paintings.

Herbert Joos died on 7 December 2019 after surgery in a Baden-Baden hospital.

== Discography ==
Joos left a rich discography as soloist, in small groups and with orchestras, especially recordings with the Vienna Art Orchestra in the 1980s.

Solo

- The Philosophy of the Fluegelhorn

Group

- Daybreak - The Dark Side Of Twilight (1977)
- Cracked Mirrors / Harry Pepl, Herbert Joos, Jon Christensen (1988)
- Orchestra / Eberhard Weber (1989)

With Vienna Art Orchestra

- Tango from Obango (Art, 1980)
- Concerto Piccolo (Hat ART, 1981)
- Suite for the Green Eighties (Hat ART, 1982)
- From No Time to Rag Time (Hat ART, 1983)
- A Notion in Perpetual Motion (Hat ART, 1985)
