= Werner Pirchner =

Austrian composer and jazz musician

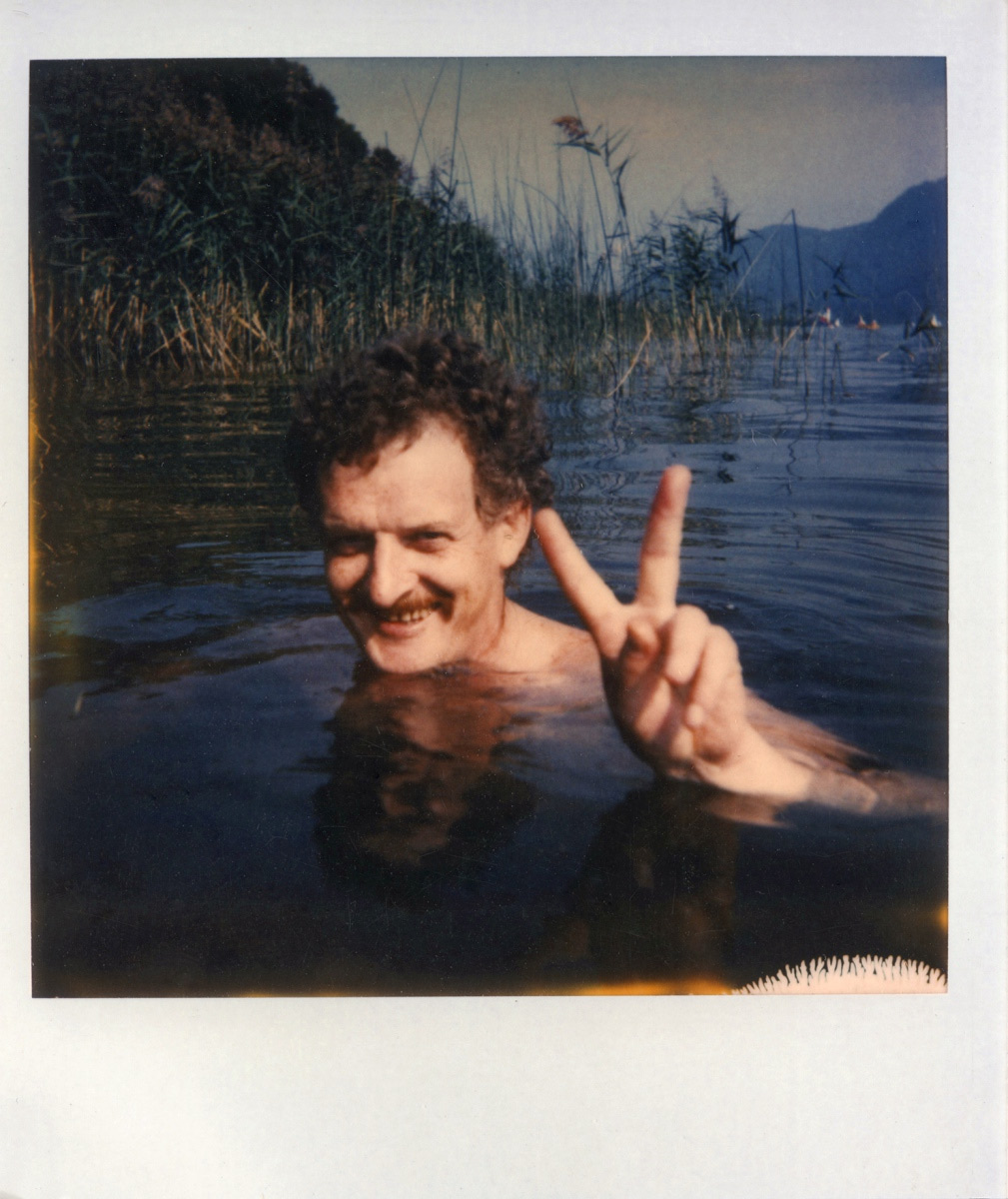
Werner Pirchner in an Austrian lake (ca. 1995)

Werner Pirchner (13 February 1940 – 10 August 2001) was an Austrian composer and jazz musician.

== Life ==
He was born in Hall in Tirol, and had his musical start playing jazz. In 1963 he played vibraphone in the Oscar-Klein-Quartett.

The last 15 years of his life he worked as a composer only. In 1973, his first tape was published. In 1974, he composed the music for the film Der Untergang des Alpenlandes. In 1975, Bert Breit invited him to compose the film music about Tyrol, for which he composed the "Streichquartett für Bläserquintett", PWV 15.

In Austria Pirchner was well-known, since he composed the "Sounddesign" for the ORF-culture radio Ö1 in 1994. In 1995, he composed the music for Hofmannsthals Jedermann at the Salzburger Festspiele.

He died in Innsbruck.

== Compositions ==
=== Film and incidental music ===
- 24 Deka Jazz-Lieder – for Henry Maternas „Face of Europe“. Musik zu 6 Filmen, op. 1 (1966)
- Brechreiz für großes Orchester – und ca. 10 andere Filmmusiken, op. 2 (1967–1970)
- Schneeweißchen und Rosenrot – Und 5 andere Theatermusiken, op. 3 (1968–1970)
- Der Untergang des Alpenlandes – Part One und Die Geschichte vom Zuckerl, von der Prinzessin und von der absahnenden Creme – Zwei Kurzfilme, op. 7 (1974/1975)
- Das rauhe Leben – Musik zum gleichnamigen Film von Heide Pils über den Dichter Alfons Petzold, op. 24 (1987)
- Gespenstersonate – Bühnenmusik zum gleichnamigen Stück von August Strindberg, op. 35 (1988)
- Mirakel – Musik zum gleichnamigen Film von Leopold Huber, op. 45 (1991)
- Der Weibsteufel – Ballettmusik zum gleichnamigen Stück von Karl Schönherr, op. 54 (1991)
- Das wunderbare Schicksal – Bühnenmusik zum gleichnamigen Stück von Felix Mitterer, op. 58 (1992)
- Feuernacht und Komplott – Musik zu den gleichnamigen Filmen, op. 72 (1994)
- Die letzten Tage der Menschheit – Musik zum gleichnamigen Stück von Karl Kraus, op. 77 (1995)
- Durch die wilden Alpen – Filmmusik (2000)

=== Ensemble music ===
- Die anachronistische Revolution und ca. Zwei Kilo 12-Ton- und Reihenexperimente – Quintet for Flute, Oboe, Bassoon, Vibraphon and Guitar, op. 5 (1969)
- Streichquartett für Bläserquintett – Variations on a Tyrolean Slave Song, op. 15 (1974)
- Birthdays – Trio für Horn, Posaune und Tuba, op. 44 (1975)
- Von der gewöhnlichen Traurigkeit. Zum Kotzen. – Quartet for two Violine, Viola and Violoncello, op. 17 (1978)
- Soiree tyrolienne – Kammersymphonie, op. 16 (1980)
- Do You Know Emperor Joe? – For Brass quintet with two Trumpet, Horn, Trombone and Tuba, op. 13 (1982/1983)
- Wem gehört der Mensch...? – Trio for Piano, Violine und Violoncello (1988)
- Aus dem Konzert für zwei Solo-Violinen – ohne Orchester – Duo für zwei Violinen, op. 33 (1988)
- L'homme au marteau dans la poche et autres travaux appliqués – (Der Mann mit dem Hammer in der Tasche und andere Fleißaufgaben), op. 52 (1991)
- Almweiß – Edelrausch – und andere Master-Zwios – Duo for two Trumpet, op. 57 (1992)
- Palmsonntag im Künstlerzimmer – Duo for Horn and Violine, op. 71 (1994)

=== Soloist music ===
- Good News from the Ziller Valley – for Violine solo (1981xx)
- Kleine Messe um C – for den lieben Gott – for Church Organ or Accordion solo, op. 14 (1982)
- Birthday-Serenade – for Pianoforte solo, op. 34 (1988)
- Einfach – Zwiefach – for Double Bass solo, op. 64 (1993)

== Discography ==
- EU. ECM Records, 1986.
