= Hans Koller =

Austrian jazz musician (1921–2003)

Antonio Hans Cyrill Koller (12 February 1921 in Vienna – 21 December 2003 in Vienna) was an Austrian jazz tenor saxophonist and bandleader.

Koller attended the University of Vienna from 1936 to 1939 and served in the armed forces from 1940 to 1946. Following World War II, he returned to Vienna and played with the Hot Club of Vienna; in 1950 he emigrated to Germany and formed a small ensemble there. In the 1950s, he played with Freddie Brocksieper, Albert Mangelsdorff, Jutta Hipp, Dizzy Gillespie, Bill Russo, Lee Konitz, Stan Kenton, Eddie Sauter, Benny Goodman, Attila Zoller, Oscar Pettiford, Kenny Clarke, Wes Montgomery, Martial Solal and Jimmy Pratt. From 1958 to 1965, he directed the jazz workshops of the Norddeutscher Rundfunk in Hamburg, returning to Vienna in 1970. Soon after he formed his own ensemble, Free Sound, and later in the decade he worked with the International Brass Company.

In addition to his playing and bandleading, Koller also composed; among his original works is a ballet entitled New York City, completed in 1968. Koller was also a recognized abstract painter.

== Tributes ==
In 2018, The Upper Austrian Jazz Orchestra published a recording of their live performance titled "In the Spirit of Hans Koller."

== As sideman ==
- Sims, Zoot. Lost Tapes Baden-Baden 1958. SWR Music #101 710 (2014)
