= Carla Bley discography =

This is a list of works by American jazz musician Carla Bley.

== Albums ==
=== As leader ===
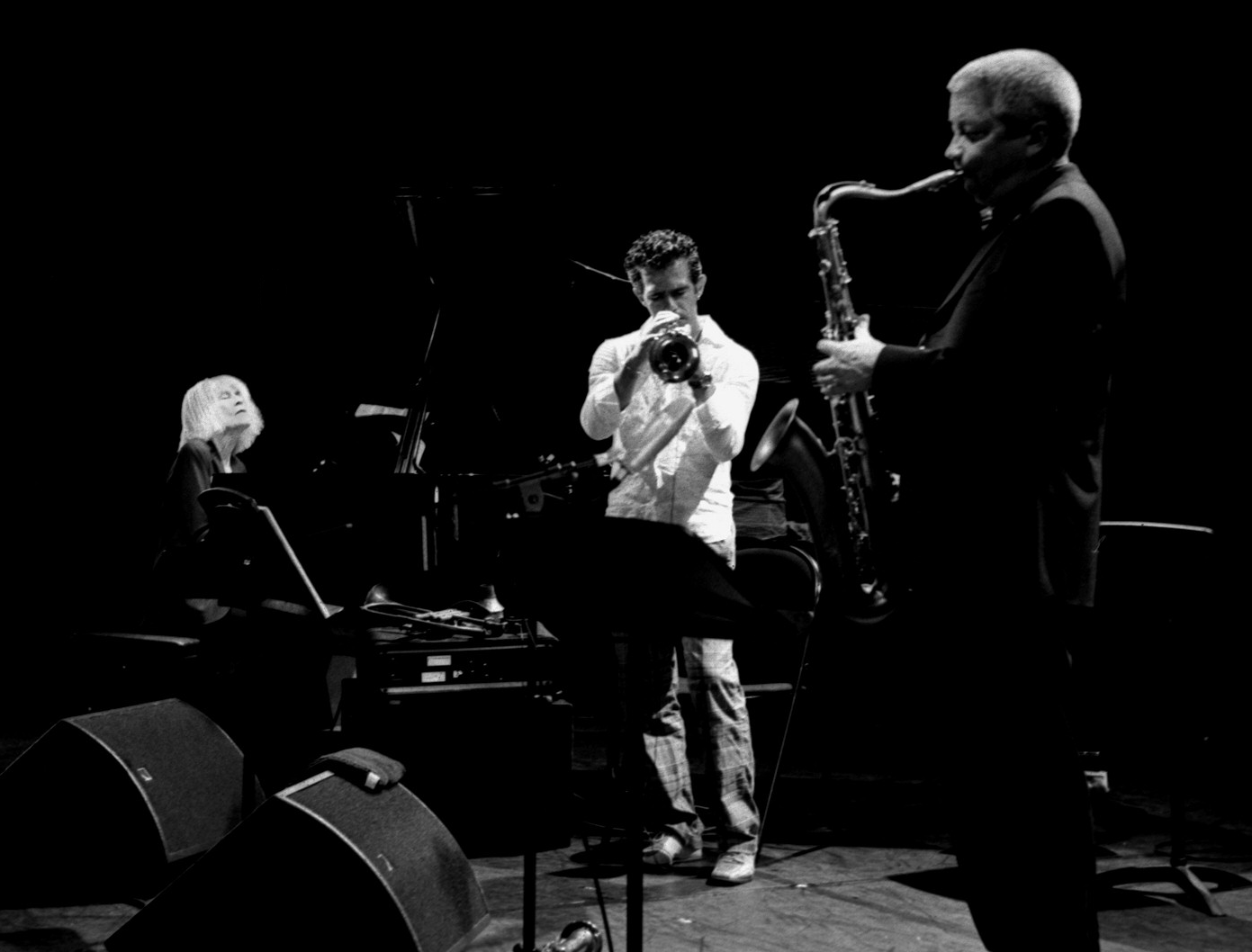
The Lost Chords find Paolo Fresu in Monaco. From left to right : Carla Bley, Paolo Fresu and Andy Sheppard

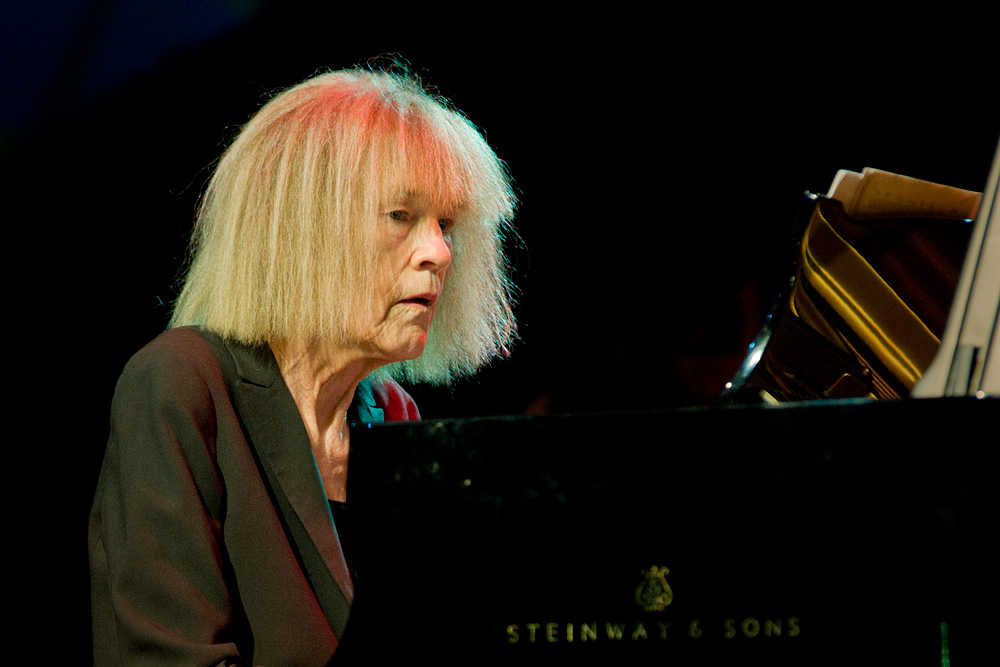
Carla Bley, Moers Festival 2012

- 1973–1974: Tropic Appetites (WATT, 1974)
- 1976: Dinner Music (WATT, 1977)
- 1977: European Tour 1977 (WATT, 1978)
- 1978: Musique Mecanique (WATT, 1979)
- 1980: Social Studies (WATT, 1981)
- 1981: Live! (WATT, 1982)
- 1981, 1983: I Hate to Sing (WATT, 1984)
- 1983: Heavy Heart (WATT, 1984)
- 1985: Night-Glo (WATT, 1985) with Steve Swallow
- 1986–1987: Sextet (WATT, 1987)
- 1988: Duets (WATT, 1988) with Steve Swallow
- 1988: Fleur Carnivore (WATT, 1989)
- 1990: The Very Big Carla Bley Band (WATT, 1991)
- 1992: Go Together (WATT, 1993) with Steve Swallow
- 1993: Big Band Theory (WATT, 1993)
- 1994: Songs with Legs (WATT, 1994) with Andy Sheppard and Steve Swallow
- 1996: The Carla Bley Big Band Goes to Church (WATT, 1996)
- 1997: Fancy Chamber Music (WATT, 1998)
- 1998: Are We There Yet? (WATT, 1999) with Steve Swallow
- 1999: 4 x 4 (WATT, 2000)
- 2002: Looking for America (WATT, 2003)
- 2003: The Lost Chords (WATT, 2004)
- 2006: Appearing Nightly (WATT, 2008)
- 2007: The Lost Chords find Paolo Fresu (WATT, 2007)
- 2008: Carla's Christmas Carols (WATT, 2009)
- 2013: Trios (ECM, 2013) with Andy Sheppard and Steve Swallow
- 2015: Andando el Tiempo (ECM, 2016) with Andy Sheppard and Steve Swallow
- 2019: Life Goes On (ECM, 2020) with Andy Sheppard and Steve Swallow

Soundtrack

- Mortelle Randonnée (Extraits de la Bande Originale Du Film) (Mercury, 1983)

=== Collaborations ===
With Gary Burton

- 1967: A Genuine Tong Funeral (RCA, 1968)

With Michael Mantler

- 1966: Jazz Realities (Fontana, 1966) – also with Steve Lacy
- 1973: No Answer (WATT) – also with Jack Bruce & Don Cherry. texts by Samuel Beckett.
- 1975: 13 & ¾ (WATT)
- 1976: The Hapless Child (WATT) – texts by Edward Gorey
- 1976: Silence (WATT) – texts by Harold Pinter
- 1977: Movies (WATT)
- 1980: More Movies (WATT)
- 1982: Something There (WATT)

With Nick Mason

- 1979: Nick Mason's Fictitious Sports (Harvest, 1981)

With Steve Swallow

- 1986-1987: Carla (Xtra Watt, 1987)
- 1991: Swallow (Xtra Watt, 1992)
- 2011: Into the Woodwork (Xtra Watt, 2013)

=== As a member ===
The Jazz Composer's Orchestra

- 1964–1965: Communication (Fontana, 1965)
- 1968: The Jazz Composer's Orchestra (JCOA, 1968) – led by Michael Mantler
- 1968-1971: Escalator over the Hill (JCOA, 1971) – a chronotransduction by Carla Bley & Paul Haines
- 1973: Relativity Suite (JCOA, 1973) – led by Don Cherry
- 1974: The Gardens of Harlem (JCOA, 1975) – led by Clifford Thornton
- 1974: Echoes of Prayer (JCOA, 1975) – led by Grachan Moncur III

The Liberation Music Orchestra

- 1969: Liberation Music Orchestra (Impulse!, 1970)
- 1983: The Ballad of the Fallen (ECM, 1983)
- 1990: Dream Keeper (Blue Note)
- 2004: Not in Our Name (Verve, 2005)
- 2011, 2015: Time/Life (Impulse!, 2016)

=== As sidewoman ===
- 1975: Jack Bruce, The Jack Bruce Band Live '75 (Polydor, 2003)
- 1976: John Greaves, Kew. Rhone. (Virgin, 1977)
- 1975–1981: Jack Bruce, Live on the Old Grey Whistle Test (Strange Fruit, 1998)
- 1981?: V.A., Amarcord Nino Rota (Hannibal, 1981) – tribute to Nino Rota (performs "8½")
- 1984?: V.A., That's the Way I Feel Now (A&M, 1984)[2LP] – tribute to Thelonious Monk (performs "Misterioso")
- 1971-1985: Gary Windo, His Master's Bones (Cuneiform, 1996)
- 1985?: V.A., Lost in the Stars: The Music of Kurt Weill (A&M, 1985) – tribute to Kurt Weill (performs "Lost in the Stars")
- 1985?: The Golden Palominos, Visions of Excess (Celluloid, 1985)
- 1991?: The Golden Palominos, Drunk with Passion (Nation/Charisma, 1991)
- 1995?: V.A., Jazz to the World (Blue Note, 1995) – compilation (performs "Let It Snow" with Michael Franks)

== Videography ==
- 1983/2003: Live in Montreal (DVD)

== Compositions recorded by other artists ==
Year recorded	Artist	Album	Composition(s)
1957	Paul Bley	Solemn Meditation	"O Plus One"
1960	George Russell	George Russell Sextet at the Five Spot	"Dance Class" and "Beast Blues"
1960	George Russell	Stratusphunk	"Bent Eagle"
1961	George Russell	George Russell Sextet in K.C.	"Rhymes"
1961	Jimmy Giuffre	Fusion	"Jesus Maria" and "In the Morning Out There"
1961	Jimmy Giuffre	Thesis	"Ictus"
1961	Jimmy Giuffre	Emphasis, Stuttgart 1961	"Jesus Maria"
1962	Don Ellis	Essence	"Donkey" aka "Wrong Key Donkey"
1962	George Russell	The Outer View	"Zig Zag"
1962/63	Paul Bley	Footloose!	"Floater", "Around Again", "Syndrome", "King Korn" and "Vashkar"
1964	Paul Bley	Turning Point	"Calls", "King Korn", "Ictus", and "Ida Lupino"
1964	Paul Bley	Barrage	"Batterie", "Ictus", "And Now the Queen", "Around Again", "Walking Woman", "Barrage"
1965	Jazz Composer's Orchestra	Communication	"Roast"
1965	Paul Bley	Touching	"Start"
1965	Attila Zoller	The Horizon Beyond	"Ictus"
1965	Art Farmer	Sing Me Softly of the Blues	"Sing Me Softly of the Blues" and "Ad Inifintum"
1965	Paul Bley	Closer	"Ida Lupino", "Start", "Closer", "Sideways in Mexico", "Batterie", "And Now the Queen" and "Violin"
1965	Steve Lacy	Disposability	"Generous 1"
1966	Steve Kuhn Trio	Three Waves	"Ida Lupino"
1967	Gary Burton	Duster	"Sing Me Softly of the Blues"
1967	Gary Burton	Lofty Fake Anagram	"Mother of the Dead Man"
1968	Steve Kuhn	Watch What Happens!	"Ad Infinitum"
1969	NRBQ	NRBQ	"Ida"
1969	Phil Woods	At the Montreux Jazz Festival	"Ad Infinitum"
1969	Tony Williams	Emergency!	"Vashkar"
1971	Bobby Naughton	Understanding	"Understanding", "Ictus", "Generous 1", and "Gloria"
1972	Paul Bley	Open, to Love	"Closer", "Ida Lupino" and "Seven"
1972	Steve Kuhn	Steve Kuhn Live in New York	"Ida Lupino"
1972	Enrico Rava	Il Giro Del Giorno in 80 Mondi	"Olhos de Gato"
1972	Paul Bley	Paul Bley & Scorpio	"King Korn", "Syndrome" and "Ictus"
1973	Paul Bley	Paul Bley/NHØP	"Olhos de Gato"
1974	Gary Burton	Ring	"Silent Spring"
1974	Jan Garbarek	Witchi-Tai-To	"A.I.R."
1974	Jaco Pastorius	Jaco	"Vashkar", "Donkey", "Overtoned", "Batterie" and "King Korn"
1974	Gary Burton	Hotel Hello	"Vashkar"
1975	Paul Bley	Alone, Again	"Olhos de Gato" and "And Now the Queen"
1975	Gary Burton	Dreams So Real	"Dreams So Real", "Ictus/Syndrome", "Jesus Maria", "Vox Humana", "Doctor", "Intermission Music"
1977	Volker Kriegel	Elastic Menu	"Sing Me Softly of the Blues"
1978	Bobby Naughton, Jerome Harris, and Cleve Pozar	About Time	"Doctor"
1979	Morrissey–Mullen	Cape Wrath	"Dreams So Real"
1980	Gary Burton	Easy as Pie	"Reactionary Tango"
1980	Gary Burton	Picture This	"Dreams So Real"
1983	Bobby Naughton	Zoar	"Vashkar"
1984	Gary Burton Quartet	Real Life Hits	"Syndrome" and "Real Life Hits"
1985	Paul Bley	Hot	"Syndrome" and "Around Again"
1986	Paul Bley	Fragments	"Seven" and "Closer"
1987	George Russell	So What	"Rhymes"
1987	Paul Bley and Paul Motian	Notes	"Batterie"
1989	Paul Bley, Jimmy Guiffre, and Steve Swallow	The Life of a Trio: Sunday	"Where Were We?"
1989	Orchestra Jazz Siciliana	Plays the Music of Carla Bley	"440", "The Lone Arranger", "Dreams So Real", "Baby Baby", "Joyful Noise", "Egyptian", and "Blunt Object"
1989	Charlie Haden	The Montreal Tapes: with Paul Bley and Paul Motian	"Ida Lupino"
1990	Leo Kottke	That's What	"Jesus Maria"
1991	Paul Bley	Paul Plays Carla	"Vashkar", "Floater", "Seven", "Around Again", "Ida Lupino", "Turns", "And Now the Queen", "Ictus", "Olhos de Gato" and "Donkey"
1991	John Surman	Adventure Playground	"Seven"
1992	Paul Bley	Homage to Carla	"Seven", "Closer", "Olhos de Gato", "And Now the Queen", "Vashkar", "Around Again", "Donkey", "King Korn", "Ictus", "Turns" and "Overtoned"
1994	John McLaughlin	After the Rain	"Sing Me Softly of the Blues"
1997	Steve Kuhn	Sing Me Softly of the Blues	"Sing Me Softly of the Blues"
2000	Michel Portal	Dockings	"Ida Lupino"
2000	Mark Turner	Ballad Session	"Jesus Maria"
2001	Don Preston	Transformation	"Walking Batteriewoman" and "The Donkey"
2001	Ken Vandermark	Free Jazz Classics Vols. 1 & 2	"King Korn" and "Calls" in segue
2003	Roberto Ottaviano	Live in Israel	"Ida Lupino"
2004	Gary Burton	Generations	"Syndrome"
2004	Leo Kottke	Try and Stop Me	"Jesus Maria"
2004	Whit Dickey	In a Heartbeat	"Calls"
2004	Chris Wiesendanger, Christian Weber and Dieter Ulrich	We Concentrate	"Jesus Maria", "Batterie" and "King Korn"
2005	Arturo O'Farrill	Live in Brooklyn	"Utviklinsang" and "Walking Battery Woman"
2005	Håkon Kornstad and Håvard Wiik	Eight Tunes We Like	"Calls"
2006	Howard Tate	Portrait of Howard	"The Lord Is Listenin' to Ya, Hallelujah"
2006	Håkon Kornstad and Håvard Wiik	The Bad and the Beautiful	"King Korn"
2006	Dave Palmer	Romance	"Ida Lupino"
2007	Eberhard Weber	Stages of a Long Journey	"Syndrome"
2007	Jonas Kullhammar	Andratx	"Ida Lupino"
2008	Guillaume de Chassy	Faraway So Close	"Ida Lupino"
2008	Marcin Wasilewski	January	"King Korn"
2009	Gary Burton	Quartet Live	"Syndrome"
2009	Emanuele Arciuli	Gates to Everywhere	"Romantic Notions 1-8"
2010	Cindy Blackman	Another Lifetime	"Vashkar", "Vashkar Reprise" and "Vashkar – The Alternate Dimension Theory"
2010	Nels Cline Singers	Initiate	"And Now the Queen"
2011	John Scofield	A Moment's Peace	"Lawns"
2012	Steve Kuhn	Wisteria	"Permanent Wave"
2013	Jeff Berlin	Low Standards	"Vashkar"
2013	Barry Altschul	The 3dom Factor	"Ictus"
2013	George Schuller	Listen Both Ways	"Jesus Maria"
2015	Mary Halvorson	Meltframe	"Ida Lupino"
2015	Rüdiger Krause	A Guitar Named Carla	"Like Animals", "Time and Us", "Real Life Hits", "Ida Lupino", "Musique mecanique III", "Utviklingssang", "Funnybird Song", "Four Banana", "Reactionary Tango", "Escalator Over The Hill" and "Lawns"
2016	Giovanni Guidi	Ida Lupino	"Ida Lupino"
2016	Frank Kimbrough	Solstice	"Seven"
2018	Nels Cline 4	Currents, Constellations	"Temporarliy"
2020	Marcin Wasilewski	Arctic Riff	"Vashkar"
