= Always Pack Your Uniform on Top =

Live album by Steve Swallow
- Released: June 5, 2000
- Recorded: April 1999
- Studio: Ronnie Scott's Jazz Club, London England
- Genre: Jazz
- Length: 47:32
- Label: Xtra Watt 10
- Producer: Steve Swallow

Steve Swallow chronology
Are We There Yet? (1998)	Always Pack Your Uniform on Top (2000)	Damaged in Transit (2001)

Always Pack Your Uniform on Top is a live album by bassist Steve Swallow recorded at Ronnie Scott's Jazz Club in December 1999 and released on the Xtra Watt label in 2000.

== Reception ==
Professional ratings
Review scores
Source	Rating
Allmusic	3/5 stars
The Penguin Guide to Jazz Recordings	3/4 stars

Allmusic awarded the album 3 stars and the review by David R. Adler states: "This is Swallow's third standards-derived quintet album, following in the footsteps of 1994's Real Book and 1996's Deconstructed... Although there's a brand new batch of tunes, Swallow applies the same approach, using familiar progressions as the basis for clever original music". In JazzTimes Bill Bennett wrote: "His gifts as a composer is equally evident in this set... Throughout, the ensemble work is outstanding, with Goodrick and Nussbaum in constant touch". On All About Jazz Glen Astarita noted: "Always Pack Your Uniform On Top is a class act - as the band most assuredly brought down the house at this time-honored jazz venue".

== Track listing ==
All compositions by Steve Swallow.

1. "Bend over Backward" - 11:29
2. "Dog With a Bone" - 6:12
3. "Misery Loves Company" - 7:48
4. "Reinventing the Wheel" - 7:48
5. "Feet First" - 7:26
6. "La Nostalgie de la Boue" - 6:49

== Personnel ==
- Steve Swallow - bass guitar
- Barry Ries - trumpet
- Chris Potter - tenor saxophone
- Mick Goodrick - guitar
- Adam Nussbaum - drums
- Tom Mark - Engineer
