= Billy Drummond =

American drummer

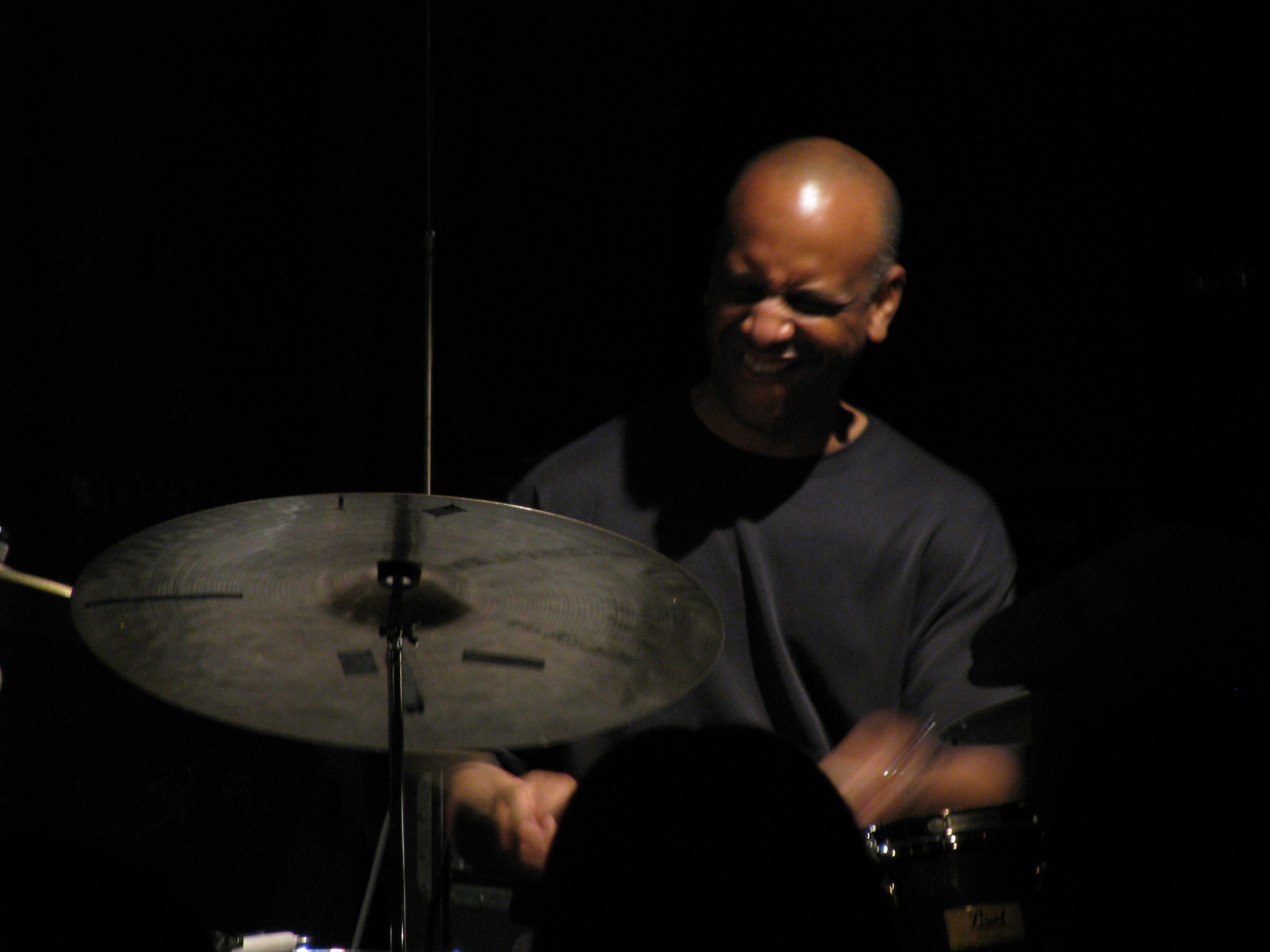
- Billy Drummond in 2008

Background information
- Born: Willis Robert Drummond Jr. June 19, 1959 (age 67); Newport News, Virginia, U.S.
- Genre: Jazz
- Occupation: Musician
- Instrument: Drums
- Years active: 1980s–present
- Labels: Criss Cross; SteepleChase
- Website: billydrummonddrums.com

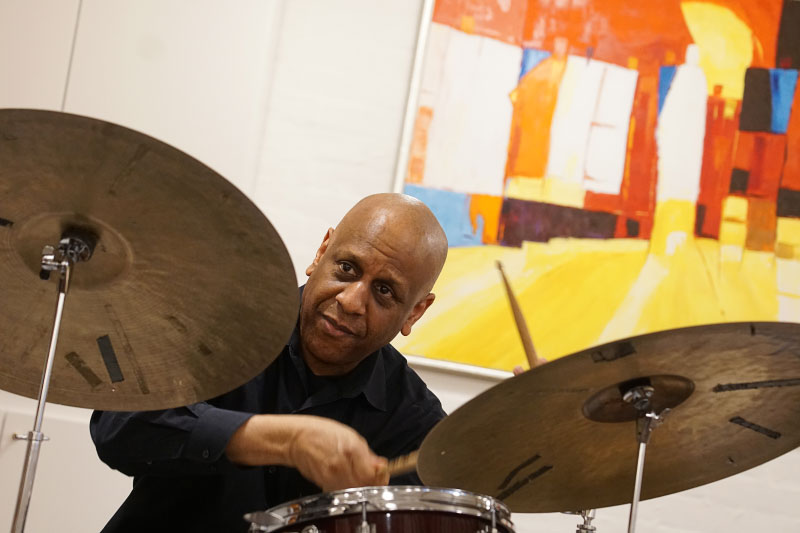
Billy Drummond in Aarhus, Denmark, 2020

Willis Robert "Billy" Drummond Jr. (born June 19, 1959) is an American jazz drummer.

== Early life ==
Billy Drummond was born in Newport News, Virginia, where he grew up listening to the extensive jazz record collection of his father, an amateur drummer and jazz enthusiast. He started playing the drums at the age of four, and was performing locally in his own band by the age of eight, and playing music with other kids in the neighborhood, including childhood friends, Victor Wooten, and the other Wooten brothers, who lived a few doors away and through whom he met Consuela Lee Moorehead, composer, arranger, music theory professor, and the founder of the Springtree/Snow Hill Institute for the Performing Arts. He attended Shenandoah College and Conservatory of Music on a Classical Percussion scholarship and, upon leaving school, became a member of a local Top 40 band called The Squares with bassist Oteil Burbridge.

== Career ==
In 1986, encouraged by Al Foster, who had invited him to sit in at the Village Vanguard and advised him to take the next step, he moved to New York and almost immediately joined the band, Out of the Blue, with whom he recorded their last album, Spiral Staircase (Blue Note Records). A year later, he joined the Horace Silver sextet, touring extensively with him before becoming a member of Sonny Rollins's band, with whom he toured for three years. During this period he also formed long-term musical associations with Joe Henderson, Bobby Hutcherson, Buster Williams, James Moody, JJ Johnson, Andrew Hill, and others.

He has made four albums as bandleader, including his Criss Cross album Dubai (featuring Chris Potter, Walt Weiskopf and Peter Washington), which was included in the list of “50 Crucial Jazz Drumming Recordings of the Past 100 Years” by Modern Drummer magazine. His most recent album, Valse Sinistre, leading his band Freedom of Ideas, with Micah Thomas, Dezron Douglas and Dayna Stephens, came out on the Canadian Cellar Live label in August 2022. He has made five albums as a co-leader, including We’ll Be Together Again with Javon Jackson and Ron Carter. In addition to touring he is Professor of Jazz Drums at the Juilliard School and New York University.

A sideman on over 350 records, Drummond has played and recorded with, among others, Bobby Hutcherson, Nat Adderley, Ralph Moore, Buster Williams, Charles Tolliver, Lew Tabackin and Toshiko Akiyoshi, Hank Jones, James Moody, Sonny Rollins, Andy LaVerne, Lee Konitz, Dave Stryker, George Colligan, Ted Rosenthal, Bruce Barth, Joe Lovano, Andrew Hill, Larry Willis, Toots Thielmans, Freddie Hubbard, Chris Potter, Eddie Gómez, Stanley Cowell, Javon Jackson, and Sheila Jordan. He is a long-time member of Carla Bley's Lost Chords Quartet, Sheila Jordan's Quartet, and the Steve Kuhn Trio. He is married to jazz singer and songwriter, Tessa Souter, with whom he has recorded four albums.

== Discography ==
=== As leader ===
- 1991: Native Colours (Criss Cross Jazz, 1992)
- 1993: The Gift (Criss Cross Jazz, 1994)
- 1995: Dubai (Criss Cross Jazz, 1996)
- 2000: The Drummonds, Letter to Evans (Videoarts Music, 2000)
- 2000: The Drummonds, Pas de Trois (True Life Jazz, 2003)
- 2001: The Drummonds, Beautiful Friendship (Videoarts Music, 2002)
- 2003: The Drummonds, Once Upon a Time (Videoarts Music, 2003)
- 2022: Valse Sinistre (Cellar Live, 2022)

Collaboration
With Bob Belden, Nicholas Payton, John Hart and Sam Yahel

- Mysterious Shorter (Chesky, 2006)

=== As a member ===
Out of the Blue

- Spiral Staircase (Blue Note, 1989)

Three's Company
With Ron Carter and Javon Jackson

- We'll Be Together Again (Chesky, 2016) – rec. 2014

=== As sideman ===
With Nat Adderley

- The Old Country (Alfa Jazz, 1991)
- A Night in Manhattan (Alfa Jazz, 1992)

With Atlantico

- En Rouge (La Fabrica'son, 2015)
- New Easter Island (La Fabrica'son, 2019)

With Carla Bley

- 2002: Looking for America (Watt/ECM, 2003)
- 2003: The Lost Chords (Watt/ECM, 2004)
- 2006: Appearing Nightly (Watt/ECM, 2008)
- 2007: The Lost Chords find Paolo Fresu (Watt/ECM, 2007)
- 2007: New Conversations (JZM, 2007)

With David Chesky

- Jazz in the New Harmonic (Chesky, 2013)
- Primal Scream (Chesky, 2015)
- Trio in the New Harmonic: Aural Paintings (Chesky, 2018)

With Stanley Cowell

- Are You Real (SteepleChase, 2014)
- Reminiscent (SteepleChase, 2015)
- No Illusions (SteepleChase, 2017)

With Anthony Ferrara

- Early Spring (Steeplechase, 2021)
- Gold Faded (Steeplechase, 2022)
- Factory Fresh (Steeplechase, 2025)

With David Hazeltine

- Waltz for Debbie (Venus, 1999)
- Mutual Admiration Society (Sharp Nine, 1999)
- Alice in Wonderland (Venus, 2004)
- Cleopatra's Dream (Venus, 2006)
- Manhattan (Chesky, 2006)
- Mutual Admiration Society 2 (Sharp Nine, 2009)

With Eddie Henderson

- 1998: Reemergence (Sharp Nine, 1999)
- 1998: Dreams of Gershwin (Key'stone, 2000)
- 2001: Oasis (Sirocco Jazz Limited, 2001)
- 2009: For All We Know (furthermore, 2010)

With Vincent Herring

- Dawnbird (Landmark, 1993)
- Secret Love (MusicMasters Jazz, 1993)
- Days of Wine and Roses (MusicMasters Jazz, 1996)

With Jonny King

- In from the Cold (Criss Cross, 1994)
- Notes from the Underground (Enja, 1996)

With Steve Kuhn

- 1997: Dedication (Reservoir, 1998)
- 1998: Countdown (Reservoir, 1999)
- 1999: The Best Things (Reservoir, 2000)
- 2001: Temptation (Venus, 2001)
- 2002: Pastorale (Sunnyside, 2007)
- 2002: Waltz – Red Side (Venus, 2002)
- 2002: Waltz – Blue Side (Venus, 2002)
- 2004: Easy to Love (Venus, 2004)
- 2005: Pavanne for a Dead Princess (Venus, 2006)
- 2007: Baubles, Bangles and Beads (Venus, 2008)
- 2010: I Will Wait for You (Venus, 2010)

With Tim Lin

- Romance in the Formosa (Linsanity Music, 2022)
- Emmpathy (Linsanity Music, 2023)

With Jeremy Pelt

- Tales, Musings, and Other Reveries (HighNote, 2015)
- Jive Culture (HighNote, 2016)

With Chris Potter

- Vertigo (Concord, 1998)
- This Will Be (Storyville, 2001) – live

With Andrew Rathbun

- Semantics (Steeplechase, 2022)
- Lost in the Shadows (Steeplechase, 2025)

With Mike Richmond

- The Pendulum (SteepleChase, 2017)
- Tones for Joan's Bones (SteepleChase, 2018)

With Tim Ries

- Alternate Side (Criss Cross, 2001)
- Live at Smalls (SmallsLIVE, 2011) – live

With Renee Rosnes

- For the Moment (Blue Note, 1990)
- Without Words (Blue Note, 1992)
- Art & Soul (Blue Note, 1999)
- With a Little Help from My Friends (Blue Note, 2001)
- Life on Earth (Blue Note, 2003)

With Archie Shepp

- True Blue (Venus, 1999)
- Deja Vu (French Ballads) (Venus, 2001)

With Jim Snidero

- Strings (Milestone, 2003)
- Close Up (Milestone, 2004)
- Crossfire (Savant, 2009)

With John Swana

- John Swana and Friends (Criss Cross, 1991)
- Feeling's Mutual (Criss Cross, 1993)

With Walt Weiskopf

- Simplicity (Criss Cross, 1993)
- Sleepless Nights (Criss Cross, 1998)
- Siren (Criss Cross, 2000)
- Sight to Sound (Criss Cross, 2003)

With Scott Wendholt

- Scheme of Things (Criss Cross, 1993)
- What Goes Unsaid (Double Time Jazz, 2000)

With Larry Willis

- Blue Fable (HighNote, 2007)
- The Offering (HighNote, 2008)

With Peter Zak

- The Decider (SteepleChase, 2009)
- Nordic Noon (SteepleChase, 2012)
- The Eternal Triangle (SteepleChase, 2013)
- Standards (SteepleChase, 2016)
- One Mind (Fresh Sound, 2018)

With others

- Tomas Franck, In New York (Criss Cross, 1991)
- Bobby Hutcherson, Mirage (Landmark, 1991)
- Jon Faddis, Hornucopia (Columbia, 1991)
- Sam Newsome, Sam I Am (Criss Cross, 1992)
- Charles Fambrough, The Charmer (CTI,1992)
- Bill Pierce, Rolling Monk (Paddle Wheel, 1993)
- Joe Henderson, Blue Note Years (Blue Note, 1993)[4CD] – compilation
- Rob Bargad, Better Times (Criss Cross, 1994)
- Lee Konitz, Dearly Beloved (SteepleChase, 1996)
- George Cables, Bluesology (SteepleChase, 1997)
- Lee Konitz and Paul Bley, Out of Nowhere (SteepleChase, 1997)
- Lee Konitz and Rich Perry, RichLee! (SteepleChase, 1997)
- Donald Brown, Wurd on the Skreet (Space Time, 1998)
- Tim Ries, Universal Spirits (Criss Cross, 1998)
- Andy Fusco, Out of the Dark (Criss Cross, 1998)
- Franco Ambrosetti, Light Breeze (Enja, 1998)
- Tommy Smith, Sound of Love (Linn, 1998)
- George Mraz, Duke's Place (Milestone, 1999)
- Carol Fredette, Everything I Need (Brownstone Recordings, 1999)
- Javon Jackson, Pleasant Valley (Blue Note, 1999)
- Sadao Watanabe, Remembrance (Verve, 1999)
- Jerome Harris ,Rendezvous (Stereophile, 1999)
- Joel Weiskopf, Search (Criss Cross, 1999)
- Mark Turner and Tad Shull, Two Tenor Ballads (Criss Cross, 2000)
- Andrew Hill, Dusk (Palmetto, 2000)
- Michael Urbaniak, Ask Me Now (SteepleChase, 2000)
- Carolyn Leonhart, Steal the Moon (Sunnyside, 2000)
- Marty Ehrlich, Song (Enja, 2001)
- John Campbell, Workin' Out (Criss Cross, 2001)
- Larry Coryell, Cedars of Avalon (HighNote, 2002)
- Sheila Jordan and Steve Kuhn, Little Song (HighNote, 2003)
- Marty Ehrlich, Line on Love (Palmetto, 2003)
- Gary Versace, Winter Sonata (M&I Jazz, 2004)
- Walt Weiskopf and Andy Fusco, Tea for Two (Criss Cross, 2005)
- David Hazeltine and George Mraz Trio, Manhattan (Chesky, 2006)
- Nicki Parrott, Moon River (Venus, 2007)
- Tessa Souter, Nights of Key Largo (Venus, 2008)
- Javon Jackson, Once Upon a Melody (Palmetto, 2008)
- Al Di Meola, Eddie Gómez, Yutaka Kobayashi, Beautiful Love: The NYC Session (Isol Discus Organization, 2008)
- Ron McCLure, New Moon (Sharp Nine, 2009)
- Nicki Parrott, Fly Me to the Moon (Venus, 2009)
- Dr. Lonnie Smith, Art of Organizing (Criss Cross, 2009)
- The Manhattan Transfer, The Chick Corea Songbook (Four Quarters Entertainment, 2009)
- Joe Locke and David Hazeltine, Mutual Admiration Society (Sharp Nine, 2009)
- Bill Mays, Mays at the Movies (SteepleChase, 2009)
- Jed Levy, One Night at the Kitano (SteepleChase, 2009)
- Arif Mardin, All My Friends are Here (NuNoise, 2010) – compilation
- V.A., Cedar Chest - The Cedar Walton Songbook (HighNote, 2010) – omnibus
- Andy Laverne, Steeplechase Jam Session Volume 29 (SteepleChase, 2010)
- Don Braden, Steeplechase Jam Session Volume 30 (SteepleChase, 2010)
- Ron McClure, Dedication (SteepleChase, 2010)
- Beat Kaestli, Invitation (Chesky, 2011)
- Yakov Okun, New York Encounter (Criss Cross, 2011)
- Tessa Souter, Beyond the Blue (Venus, 2011)
- Jesse Davis, Live at Smalls (SmallsLIVE, 2012) – live
- Tony Lakatos, Home Tone (SKP, 2012)
- Vincent Hsu, Homeland (AisaMuse, 2014)
- Burak Bedikyan, Leap of Faith (SteepleChase, 2015)
- John Hebert, Rambling Confessions (2015)
- Emma Larsson, Sing to the Sky (2015)
- Andy Fusco Whirlwind (SteepleChase, 2016)
- Freddie Redd, With Due Respect (SteepleChase, 2016)
- Camille Thurman, Inside the Moment (Chesky, 2017)
- Mark Whitfield, Live & Uncut (Chesky, 2017)
- Allegra Levy, Cities Between Us (SteepleChase, 2017)
- Tessa Souter, Picture in Black and White (NOA, 2018)
- Jim Snidero and Jeremy Pelt, Jubilation! Celebrating Cannonball Adderley (Savant, 2018)
- Frank Kimbrough, Monk's Dreams: The Complete Compositions of Thelonious Sphere Monk (Sunnyside, 2018)
- Pierre Eriksson, NYCD: A Tribute to Art Van Damme (self-released, 2018)
- Sam Dillon, Out in the Open (Cellar Live, 2018)
- Takayuki Yagi, New Departure (JazzTOKYO, 2018)
- Andrea Domenici, Playing Who I Am (Abeat, 2019)
- Stephen Riley, Friday the 13th (Steeplechase, 2020)
- Charles McPherson, Jazz Dance Suites (Chazz Mack Music, 2020)
- V.A., Kimbrough (Newvelle, 2021) – tribute
- Gabor Bolla, On the Move (Stunt, 2021)
- Vicki Burns, Lotus Blossom Days (ViBu Jazz, 2022)
- Stephen Riley, My Romance (SteepleChase, 2022)
- Skip Grasso, Becoming (Barking Coda Music, 2022)
- Carlos Franzetti, In the Wee Small Hours (Sunnyside, 2022)
- Adam Shulman, Just the Contrafacts (Cellar Music, 2022)
- Dave Pietro, The Talisman (Steeplechase, 2024)
- Charles McPherson, Reverence (Smoke Sessions, 2024)
- Mferghu, Manhattanville Serenade (Steeplechase, 2024)
- Ilya Osachuk, The Answer (self-released, 2024)
- Tessa Souter, Shadows and Silence: The Erik Satie Project (Naanara, 2025)

== Sources ==
- Billy Drummond / Music / Discography
- Leonard Feather and Ira Gitler, The Biographical Encyclopedia of Jazz. Oxford, 1999, p. 154.
- Gary W. Kennedy, "Billy Drummond". Grove Dictionary of Jazz online.
