= Parlance (album) =

Studio album by Steve Swallow
- Released: 1995
- Recorded: March 1995
- Studio: Studio De La Grande Armee, Paris, France
- Genre: Jazz
- Length: 53:54
- Label: Instant Present Records
- Producer: Brian Bennett

Steve Swallow chronology
Songs with Legs (1994)	Parlance (1995)	Deconstructed (1997)

Parlance is a studio album by American bassist Steve Swallow recorded together with British pianist John Taylor. The album was released in 1995 via Instant Present label.

== Track listing ==
No.	Title	Writer(s)	Length
1.	"Up Too Late"	Swallow	8:50
2.	"Hullo Bolinas"	Swallow	6:07
3.	"Full Circle"	Swallow	6:24
4.	"Parlance"	Swallow	4:25
5.	"Evans Above"		5:26
6.	"Never"	Swallow	6:53
7.	"Anxiety / The Color of Mortal Life"	Hubert Nuss	7:02
8.	"Carnation"	Swallow	3:36
9.	"Hermana Guappa"	Steve Arguelles	5:11
Total length:			53:54

== Personnel ==
Band

- Steve Swallow – bass
- John Taylor – piano

Production

- Brian Bennett – producer
- Philippe Laffont – engineer
- Mark Van – assistant engineer
