= The Carla Bley Big Band Goes to Church =

Live album by The Carla Bley Big Band
- Released: 1996
- Recorded: July 19–21, 1996
- Venue: Chiesa San Francesco Al Prato, Umbria Jazz, Perugia, Italy
- Genre: Jazz
- Length: 68:19
- Label: Watt/ECM
- Producer: Carla Bley & Steve Swallow

Carla Bley chronology
Songs with Legs (1994)	The Carla Bley Big Band Goes to Church (1996)	Fancy Chamber Music (1997)

The Carla Bley Big Band Goes to Church is a live album by American composer, bandleader and keyboardist Carla Bley recorded in Perugia, Italy as part of the Umbria Jazz Festival and released on the Watt/ECM label in 1996.

== Reception ==
The Allmusic review by Stacia Proefrock awarded the album 4½ stars and stated "The Carla Bley Big Band Goes to Church is a perfect showcase for the forward-thinking compositions and arrangements of Carla Bley... Not quite as experimental as her earlier compositions, this album manages, regardless to be among her best work in the '90s". The Penguin Guide to Jazz awarded it 3⅓ stars stating "The best Bley album since Fleur Carnivore? " The JazzTimes review by Willard Jenkins said "the music bears resemblance to what one might expect from an enlightened 21st century church service".

Professional ratings
Review scores
Source	Rating
Allmusic	4.5/5 stars
Penguin Guide to Jazz	3.5/4 stars
Tom Hull	B+

== Track listing ==
All compositions by Carla Bley except where noted.

1. "Setting Calvin's Waltz" - 23:51
2. "Exaltation/Religious Experience/Major" (Carl Ruggles/Bley/Bley) - 9:33
3. "One Way" - 8:29
4. "Beads" - 8:27
5. "Permanent Wave" - 10:07
6. "Who Will Rescue You?" - 7:52

== Personnel ==
- Carla Bley - piano
- Lew Soloff, Guy Barker, Claude Deppa, Steve Waterman - trumpet
- Gary Valente, Pete Beachill, Chris Dean - trombone
- Richard Henry - bass trombone
- Roger Janotta - flute, soprano saxophone, alto saxophone
- Wolfgang Puschnig - alto saxophone
- Andy Sheppard, Jerry Underwood - tenor saxophone
- Julian Argüelles - baritone saxophone
- Karen Mantler - organ, harmonica
- Steve Swallow - bass guitar
- Dennis Mackrel - drums
