= Tessa Souter =

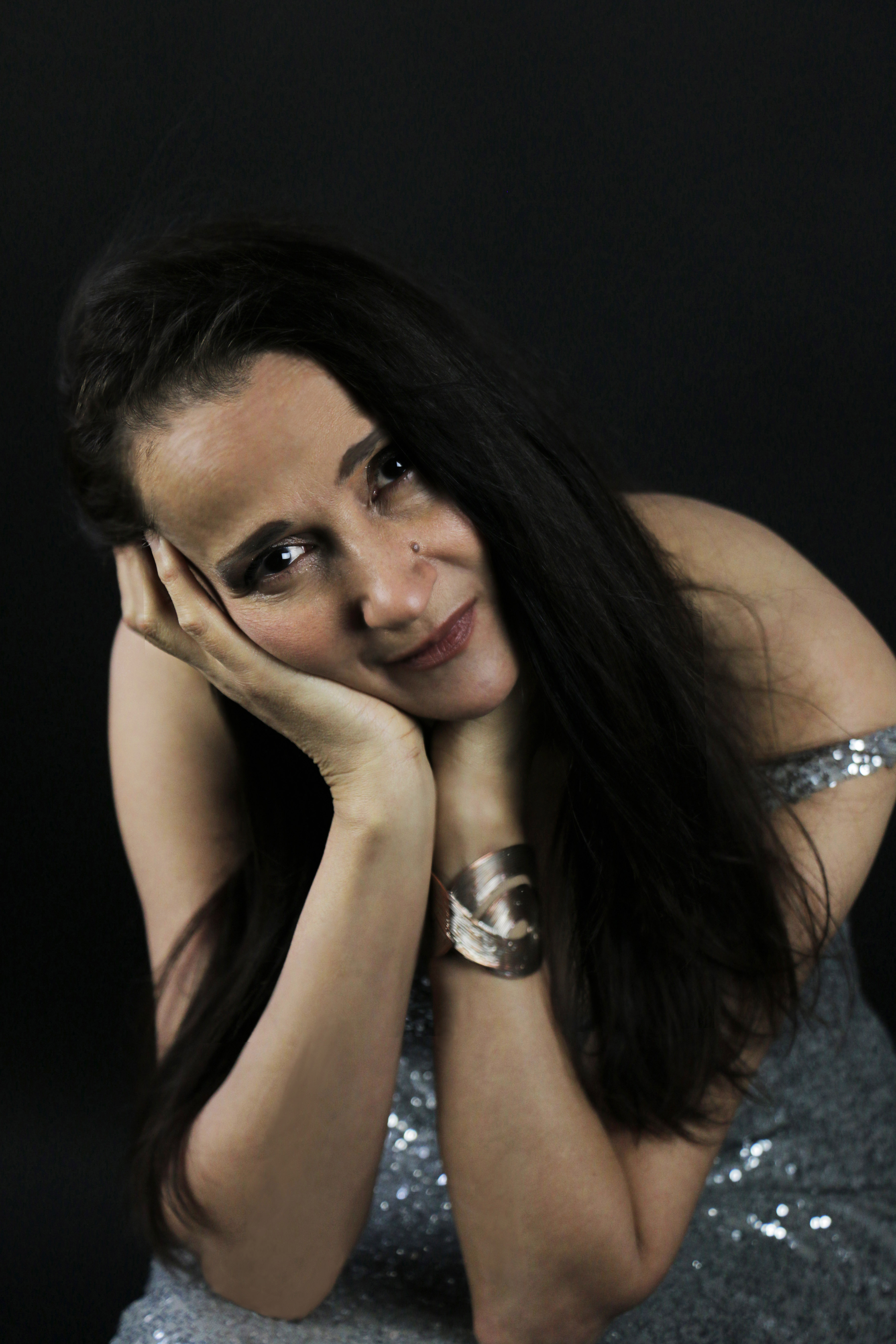
- Tessa Souter

Background information
- Born: April 3, 1956 (age 70); London, England
- Genre: Jazz
- Occupations: Singer, songwriter
- Years active: 1999–present
- Labels: Nara, Venus, Motéma
- Website: tessasouter.com

Tessa Souter /ˈsuːtər/ is a jazz singer, songwriter and writer.

== Early life ==
Tessa Souter was born in London to a Trinidadian father and an English mother. She studied piano, and then, at the age of twelve, taught herself to play guitar. At sixteen she ran away from home, got married, had a child and went back to school to study 'O and 'A' levels and later attended London University (Queen Mary College) where she received a degree in English Literature. After college, she worked in editing jobs, first for an engineering company, then at Parents magazine, before becoming a freelance copy editor and writer for Elle, Elle Decoration, Cosmopolitan, among other magazines.

In 1992, Souter moved to the U.S., working as a freelance writer for the international press, including the London Times, Guardian, Independent, The Daily Telegraph, Elle, Elle Decoration, House Beautiful, Vogue, Sydney Morning Herald, and South China Morning Post. In San Francisco she became one of the founding members of The Writer's Grotto along with Po Bronson, Ethan Canin, Ethan Watters, Josh Kornbluth, and David Munro.

== Career ==
In San Francisco, she began attending open mics in San Francisco for fun before moving to New York in 1997, where she continued to sit in at various jazz clubs in the city. Encouraged by various musicians to consider a musical career, she won a scholarship and studied briefly at Manhattan School of Music, where she met jazz legend Mark Murphy who offered her the opportunity to study with him for four years in exchange for running his workshops and private classes. She also cites jazz singer Sheila Jordan as a significant mentor.

She had her first professional gig at New York's Caffe San Marco in February 1999 and recorded her first album, Listen Love (Nara), in 2004. She was invited to record for the Japanese label Venus Records, making Nights of Key Largo in 2008 and Beyond the Blue in 2011, which was subsequently licensed by Motéma (for whom she had already recorded Obsession in 2009), who released it worldwide. It was chosen as a Jazz CD of the Year by the British Sunday Times magazine, when it was released there in 2013. In 2018, Souter released Picture in Black and White (NOA), which was the second of her albums to be chosen by the British Sunday Times magazine as a Jazz CD of the Year. She is married to drummer Billy Drummond.

A prolific lyricist, she was granted shared writing by Wayne Shorter for his song Ana Maria (which she recorded on Picture in Black and White). Kurt Elling contacted in her 2024 for permission to collaborate on her lyrics to the song, which he released a version of on his album, Wildflowers Volume 1. Her 2025 album Shadows and Silence: The Erik Satie Project, features her own lyrics, with jazz arrangements by Luis Perdomo, to a clutch of Erik Satie's most famous Gymnopedies and Gnossiennes.

She has performed and/or recorded with Lynne Arriale, Alan Broadbent, Alec Dankworth, Billy Drummond, Steve Wilson, Nadje Noordhuis, Joel Frahm, David Gilmore, Jim Hart, Nikki Iles, Howard Johnson, Steve Kuhn, Dana Leong, Joe Locke, Romero Lubambo, Marvin Sewell, Lew Soloff, Kenny Werner, Jay Leonhart, Luis Perdomo, Yotam Silberstein, Clarence Penn, Yasushi Nakamura and Keita Ogawa.

== Discography ==
- Listen Love (Nara Music, 2004)
- Nights of Key Largo (Venus, 2008)
- Obsession (Motéma Music, 2009)
- Beyond the Blue (Venus, 2012)
- Picture in Black and White (Noa, 2018)
- Shadows and Silence: The Erik Satie Project (Noanara, 2025)

== Books ==
- Souter, Tessa. 2006. Anything I Can Do You Can Do Better: How to Unlock Your Creative Dreams and Change Your Life. Vermillion/Penguin.
