= Urban Sax =

Urban Sax is an ensemble founded by the French composer Gilbert Artman made up of massive numbers of saxophones, accompanied by percussion and sometimes voices. The group is directed by Artman and performs his compositions, which are generally repetitive and minimalist, often sounding somewhat mechanistic rather than conventionally expressive.

The group was formed in 1973, when Artman organized a concert by a group of eight saxophonists he had produced at a classical music festival in Menton, in the south of France. In subsequent years, the number of players grew to 12, 16, 20, 24, and 30, and by the early 21st century, the group consisted of 52 musicians (with saxophones ranging from the soprano to bass registers). Artman frequently integrates local musicians and dancers into his performances, and thus the ensemble can encompass as many as 200 performers.

Urban Sax has performed throughout Europe, in Asia and at Expo 86 in Vancouver. The group's performances are performance art happenings; players wear metallic space suit-like costumes together with gas masks, and each performance is a unique ritualistic event that is planned for the particular architectural or natural space where it is to take place.

== The Group ==
Current and former members:

- Concept, composition and conducting: Gilbert Artman, Assistant Gerard Amsellem
- Administration Management : Gilles Yepremian
- Sound : Live, mixing: Bertin Meynard, Patrick Woindrich, Gilles Claret, Yvan Feder, Gerard Amsellem, Simon Rasetaniaina, Tod Todedjrapou, Phil Drom, Philippe Bolliet, Philippe Dufresnoy
- Lighting : Hugues Lechevrel, Gilles Claret, Sylvie de Nantes, François Guillet, Matthieu Aufort, Jean-Marie Prouvez, Michel Touitou, Thierry Montaigne, Todd Todedjrapou, Jacques Benyeta
- Costume production: Dao, Toto Rossi, Daniel Dagois, Wolfram Haider, Catherine Udino,
- Organization and internal coordination: Jacques Remus, Gerard Amsellem, Phil Drom, Tod Todedjrapou, Christian David, Alain Douchet, Cyril Badaut, Fred Mangin, Sarah Isacco (+ web-mastering), Philippe Dufresnoy, Lisa Berri, Sandrine Robillard, Miguel Yanover.
- Tenor Sax: Werner Durand, Geraldine Andre, Pascal Nicolle, Antoine Duvernet, Pascal Barres, Olivier Moret, Phil Drom, Bernard Ghiringhelli, Pierre Clementi, Andy Sheppard, Laurent Grangier, Ruben Alterio, Lionel Coronel, Jacky Dupety, Eric Barret, Yvan Feder, Richard Foy, Jacques Oeuzop-Milly, Jean-marc Poly, Antoine Rossi, Fred Wallich, Jacques Debray, Omar Mansouri, Olivier Poriel, Bruno Rioux Maillard, Moïse Sanchez, Miguel Yanover, Nicolas Stephan, Ivan Avice, Xavier Goulet, Manu le Houezec, Frédéric Mangin, Olivier Mascaro, Alain Osowski, Patrick Papineau, Sheik-Omar Sanogo, Fred Acquaviva, Cyril Badaut, Marc Thomas, Philippe Esclapez, Martial Dubois, Laurent Lemay, Hervé Milet, Sylvain Cathala, Armando Estima, Remy Bousseau, Gianfranco Grompone, Philippe Dufresnoy, Matthieu Allemandou, Guillaume Christophel, Walter Mineo, Thomas Laurent, Cedric Roms, Laurent Grouet, Matthieu Bresolin, Christophe Chirat, Eliahou Haziza, Isabelle Theillout, Mathias Luszpinski, Alain Vilaneau, Anatoli Gerassimov, Romano Pratesi, Adrien Begue, Patrick Hamel, Guilhem Verger, Ilia Lumbroso, Pierre Chaumie, Frederic Driay, Roland Seilhes, Nicolas Barbier, Raphael Herlem, Jacqueline Schulz, Clement Nourrit, Pascal Minier, Antoine Belec, Stephane Becarie, Andre Leneol, Annie Sabas, Axel Bagreaux, Bebo Carella, Cathy Dezon, David Moati, Denis Boniton, Fabien Durand, Eric Plande, Fred Bodu, Fred Buram, Geoffrey Secco, Jean Christophe Lewin, Jean Luc Tutakowsky, Stephane Bonnavaud, Serge Berger, Pierre Marcassoli
- Alto Sax: Claude Bernard, Jean Augeron, Christian Casaliggi, Patrice Quentin, Christian Chanet, Lionel Coronel, Adrien Duplay, Alain Potier, Daniel Dumas, Françoise Dupety, Claude Giverne, Paul Hugson, Philippe Hollande, Jacques Remus, Paul Stocker, Jean-Pierre Thiraut, Marlene Aufray, Alain Brammer, Sebastien Jalier, Philippe Dibetta, Bernard Duplay, Jean-Marc Gardeux, Lucile Antoine, Patricia Guigui, Christian Leydet, François Hucliez, Sabine Joannot, Jean-Michel Laugier, Charles Nguyen, Helene Nougaret, Christian Raynaud, Marc Thomas, Coralie Druelle, Alain Douchet, Kamel Hamdi, Evelyne Guyon-Canedo, Adrien Amey, Jean-François Becquaert, Sarah Isacco, Hervé Legendre, Robert Leriche, Hervé Millet, Jean-Louis Moisset, Marion Monnet, Raymond Rodriguez, Eric Todjerapou, Karine Weider, Philippe Ginestal, Sebastian Cohen, Tullia Morand, Claude Hebrard, Maïa Abed, François Lamelliere, Sara Zaoui, Timothée Grandguillotte, Cathy Heyden, Daniel Dagois, Wolfram Haider, Florence Kraus, Sebastien Arfouilloux, Veronique Jan, Sylvain Tamalet, Guy Roch, Bruno Ottavy, Eric Lombume, Ken Marti, Marielle Chatin, Alain Bruhl, Benedicte Courel, Marino Zappelinni, Julien Danty, Lionel Coronel, Olivier Hutin, Lynda Sery, Christelle Satti, Gwen Gautier, Bruno Kruch, Daniele Cabasso, Frederic Schmidely, Gilles Benson, Huw Lloyd, Nicklos Artman, Nicolas Jambin, Richard Learmont, Yannick Lasager, Yann Laporte
- Baritone Sax and Bass Sax: Gerard Amsellem, Nick Carver, Philippe Bolliet, Yvan Feder, Luc Lemasne, Frederic Farrieu, Armand Antonioli, Jean-Pierre Chaty, Daniel Kientzy, Cyril Badaut, Alain Mauviel, Colas Mathe, Fabien Chouraki, Carole Sauvanet, Alain Douchet, Jacques Frezal, Philippe Ortega, Romain Tallet, Serge Cahu, Manu Lochin, Sylvain Tamalet, Daniel Clement, Yann Balzer, Eric Bayle, Benjamin Kurpisz, Benoit Morin, Bernard Guerin, Luc Tavignot, Yann Quemere, Pierre Bocca Barteille,
- Soprano Sax: Sabine Breuillot, Richard Foy, Patrice Quentin, Thibault Saladin, Fred Wallich, Susan Allen, Jacques Remus, Antoine Duvernet, Philippe Motte, Patrick Thouroude, Michel Marin, Alain Vilaneau, Adrien Amey, Armando Estima, Jean Louis Moisset, Françoise Whittington, Paul Fathi Lacombe, Antoine Viard, Nicolas Teuscher,
- (Percussion) Vibraphone: Mireille Bauer, Olivier Cole, Pierre Marcault, Vincent Lespagnole, Pascal Battus, Anita Roussel, Philippe Vidal, Christophe Rossi, Jerome Cury, Georges Pennetier, Emiko Ota, Jean Pierlot, Jeanne Added, Gregoire Herman, Jose Babeu, Jano Hanela, Marc Blanc, Guglio Romoli, Muriel Castebois, Norbert Lucarain, Antonin Leymarie, Alain Rouaud
- (Strings) Cello: Thierry Arnoud, Yves Moreau, Pascal Morow, Sophie Zananini, Mireille Cholet, Diana Dimitrova Bock, Lucille Antoine, Florence Hennequin, Eglantine Chaffin, Veronique Tat, Diane Gauthier, François-Pierre Fol, Didier Petit, Arnold Achard, Dominique Hsu, Helene Bass, Jeanne Hadded, Julien Amedro,
- Trumpet: Minico Arnal, Jacques Berrocal et Antoine Rossi
- Guitum (Guitar-Synthesizer): Dominique Grimaud
- Piano: Anne Ballester, Peter Varady,
- Electric guitar, Bass guitar: Bernard Weber, Thierry Arredondo, Didier Berland, Jacques Boucher, Jean-Pierre Comencas, Livio Pineau, Xavier Baulleret, Sandrine Robillard, Jean Francois Pauvros, Bruno Porto
- Chorus: Chantal des Horts, Olivier Foy, Evelyne Hamon, Marie-Claire Haoussine, Anna Losskry, Catherine Mazauric, Liliane Vaquero, Julie Zimine, Marie-Laure de Beausacq, Beatriz Sterne de Fonteneu, Suzanne Bennarouche, Valérie Btesh, Martine Desoille, Cecile Maestre, Diane Dupuis, Viviane Ginapé, Deborah Kagan, Dominique Hamen, Véronique Kone, Dominique Greffier, Anne Lise Troadec, Dominique Lefevre, Elisabeth Steiner, Lea Schivre, Catherine Jallet, Elisabeth Miailhe, Joëlle Papineau, Micou Papineau, Joëlle Saladin, Clemence Desprez, Maryvonne Sosse, Galeta Streiter, Julie Zimine, Liliane Vaquero, Elisabeth Zimine, Edwige Chandelier, Anyel Dupuis, Cora Dupuis, Laetitia Frenod, Julie Gay, Jenny Godula, Dominique Martinelli, Dorea Diabate, Laure Urgin, Brigitte Renaud, Manuela Levillain, Marie Pierre Lecoq, Moina Stoch Erichson, Nadine Richert, Nouchka Lenders, Nauzicaa Passaris, Rhim Amich, Vincianne Regattierri, Traciana Graves, Christelle Chaaban, Cathy Varda, Nikki Matheson, Eleonore Faliere, Colette Kister, Ines Letoquart, Natacha Rosine, Yolande Rodriguez, Armelle Orieux, Toussy Thalassa, Barbara Weber, Karine Aime, Karine Vimont, Flore Boixel, Anne Warin, Carole Agostini, Sabine Carty, Christine Dugas, Cecile Rives, Rose Marie Todaro, Nathalie Fagour, Tiphenn Fauchois, Jeannette Kuehn, Véronique Miath, Hélène Vitorge, Dalhia Bellaiche, Lisa Berri, Anne Gouraud, Isabelle Ricard, Nathy Thai Thien, Alice Lechartier, Melody Linhart, Isabelle Charrier, Charlotte Cabanac, Laurence Dinjart, Chloe Norel, Frederique Genvrin, Barbara Weber, Sylvie Coulon, Virginie Laurent, Nathalie James, Zoya Zharzhevsky, Barbara Floro, Manon Iatttoni, Marion Cassel, Rachel Dubour, Anne Prud'hon, Evelyne Voillaume, Sylvie Coulon
- Dance : Agnes Brun, Alexandra Berthome, Anne Fournier, Florence Neumuller, Sandra Falcon, Beatrice Reynier, Anne Saddavong, Béatrice Crombe, Mandy Rabin, Catherine Testa, Murielle Martinenghi, Cecile Dalmagne, France Hervé, Sophie Niccoleau, Marie Pecquery, Florence D’hellier, Barbara Migny, Florence Neumuller, Emilie Bajard, Sandrine Robillard, Menaka de Mahodaya, Cecile Hannart, Corinne Hadjadj, Dorothee Marcivici, Emilie Martinez, Marie Falquet, Vera Kubikova

== Discography ==
- 1977 : Urban Sax 1- LP Cézame / Cobra COB 37.004 (CD 90 “Urban Sax 1 & 2” Spalax)
- 1978 : Urban Sax 2- LP Cézame / Cobra COB 37.017 (CD 90 “Urban Sax 1 & 2” Spalax)
- 1982 : avec Pierre Henry: Paradise Lost- LP Philips 6313 293
- 1986 : Fraction Sur Le Temps- LP Celluloïd CEL 6788 (CD 91 EPM Musique 982042)
- 1991 : Spiral- CD EPM Musique FCD 1125
- 1991 : Live In Tokyo - Mirage de Son- VHS EPM Musique FVK 700001
- 1993 : To the Happy Few- CD + recueil & partitions Cézame SAM 002
- 1995 : Urban Sax à Jakarta- CD + livre photos Cézame / Kosinus AWA 95002
- 2001 : Quad Sax - CD Spalax Music CD 14563
- 2014 : Inside - DVD 5.1 + CD + VINYL + Livret - Urban Noisy Records UN 45800
- 2016 : Live in Pori 1984 - CD + vinyl - Ektro Records ektro-123
