= Native Colours =

Studio album by Billy Drummond Quartet
- Released: 1992
- Recorded: March 15, 1991
- Studio: Van Gelder Studio, Englewood Cliffs, NJ
- Genre: Jazz
- Length: 62:34
- Label: Criss Cross Jazz; Criss 1057
- Producer: Peter Leitch

Billy Drummond chronology
Native Colours (1992)	The Gift (1995)

Native Colours is the debut album by drummer Billy Drummond which was recorded in 1991 and released on the Dutch Criss Cross Jazz label the following year.

== Reception ==
Professional ratings
Review scores
Source	Rating
Allmusic	3/5 stars
The Penguin Guide to Jazz Recordings	3/4 stars

In his review on Allmusic, Greg Turner stated "This is a fine debut by one of jazz's best young drummers".

== Track listing ==
All compositions by Renee Rosnes except where noted

1. "8/4 Beat" (Bobby Hutcherson) – 5:49
2. "Native Colours" – 6:11
3. "San Francisco Holiday - Worry Later" (Thelonious Monk) – 6:14
4. "Waltz for Sweetie" (Walter Bishop Jr.) – 10:08
5. "One for Walton" – 4:54
6. "Lexicon" – 6:45
7. "Ruby, My Dear" (Monk) – 6:10
8. "Yesterday's Gardenias" (Nelson Cogane, Sammy Mysels, Dick Robertson) – 9:57
9. "Happy House" (Ornette Coleman) – 6:25

== Personnel ==
- Billy Drummond – drums
- Steve Wilson – soprano saxophone, alto saxophone
- Steve Nelson – vibraphone
- Renee Rosnes – piano
- Ray Drummond – bass
