= Trios (Carla Bley album) =

Studio album by Carla Bley / Andy Sheppard / Steve Swallow
- Released: September 6, 2013
- Recorded: April 2013
- Genre: Jazz
- Length: 56:14
- Labels: ECM; ECM 2287
- Producer: Manfred Eicher

Carla Bley chronology
Carla's Christmas Carols (2009)	Trios (2013)	Andando el Tiempo (2016)

Trios is an album by American composer and pianist Carla Bley with saxophonist Andy Sheppard and bass guitarist Steve Swallow, recorded in April 2013 and released on ECM later that year. This was the first occasion on which these longtime collaborators had worked as a trio since 1994's Songs with Legs.

== Reception ==
Professional ratings
Review scores
Source	Rating
Allmusic	4/5 stars
The Guardian	4/5 stars
Tom Hull	B+

The AllMusic review by Thom Jurek awarded the album 4 stars and stated "Trios offers more than just re-arrangements of some of Bley's classic tunes with a smaller group; it portrays how timeless she is as an artist, and just how integral is her role in the development of modern creative jazz."

Writing in The Guardian, John Fordham observed "As the almost 20-year-old partnership between composer/pianist Carla Bley, bass guitarist Steve Swallow and British saxist Andy Sheppard has evolved, Bley the reluctant pianist has grown more assured, and the tonally subtle Sheppard more minimal, while Swallow holds the music in shape with his flawlessly purring lines."

The All About Jazz review by John Kelman said that "Without muss or fuss, Bley, Swallow and Sheppard have, with Trios, created that most perfect of chamber records, filled with shrewd surprises and a delicate dramaturgy that reveals itself further with each and every listen" Another review by Sammy Stein stated "Some of the tunes are familiar as Bley has recorded them before, but here they are given a new life, energy and subtle changes of interpretation. The communication between players and intensity of the musicians is clear. Simply put, this is great music, well played."

The JazzTimes review by Thomas Conrad said "Carla Bley’s reputation as an important composer and arranger is based on her work with larger ensembles. Trios is a glimpse into her aesthetic world stripped to its barest essentials... No layers are possible, only open-ended implications and the stark designs created by three very different instrumental voices juxtaposed in space."

== Track listing ==
All compositions by Carla Bley

1. "Utviklingssang" - 7:55
2. "Vashkar" - 7:22
3. "Les Trois Lagons (D'Après Henri Matisse): Plate XVII/Plate XVIII/Plate XIX" - 14:59
4. "Wildlife: Horns/Paws Without Claws/Sex with Birds" - 11:34
5. "The Girl Who Cried Champagne" - 14:24

== Personnel ==
- Carla Bley – piano
- Andy Sheppard – soprano saxophone, tenor saxophone
- Steve Swallow – bass guitar
