= The Lost Chords find Paolo Fresu =

Studio album by Carla Bley
- Released: November 6, 2007
- Recorded: May 19–20, 2007
- Genre: Jazz
- Label: Watt/ECM
- Producer: Steve Swallow

Carla Bley chronology
Appearing Nightly (2006)	The Lost Chords find Paolo Fresu (2007)	Carla's Christmas Carols (2009)

The Lost Chords find Paolo Fresu is an album by American composer, bandleader and keyboardist Carla Bley with Andy Sheppard, Steve Swallow, and Billy Drummond and Paolo Fresu recorded in Europe in 2007 and released on the Watt/ECM label.

== Reception ==
The Allmusic review by Thom Jurek awarded the album 4½ stars and stated "With all of her strengths on display here, from humor and a strict reliance on substance over her own considerable instrumental virtuosity, to her canny compositional skill at writing balanced and nuanced, elegant works that add to the actual literature of the music, this baby trumps The Lost Chords quartet date (it's sort of amazing that's even possible) in all the right places, making it arguably the finest small group record Bley's ever made".

The All About Jazz review by John Kelman said that "The Lost Chords Find Paolo Fresu finds Bley at her most elegant compositionally; but with a certain je ne sais quoi that still injects subtle levity. Beautiful" Another review by Budd Kopman stated "Carla Bley has composed music for her quartet, plus the outstanding Italian trumpeter Paolo Fresu that is just about the ideal mixture of beauty and intellect'.

The JazzTimes review by Thomas Conrad said "it is the best album in years from each of them. The fact that Fresu fits seamlessly into Bley’s band the Lost Chords proves that he is an unusually brainy sensualist. And the purity and warmth and soulfulness of his sound make Bley’s lyricism less ambiguous".

Professional ratings
Review scores
Source	Rating
Allmusic	4.5/5 stars
Tom Hull	B+
The Penguin Guide to Jazz Recordings	3.5/4 stars

== Track listing ==
All compositions by Carla Bley.

1. "The Banana Quintet: One Banana" – 8:29
2. "The Banana Quintet: Two Banana" – 6:37
3. "The Banana Quintet: Three Banana" – 3:50
4. "The Banana Quintet: Four" – 4:51
5. "The Banana Quintet: Five Banana" – 7:51
6. "The Banana Quintet: One Banana More" – 1:23
7. "Liver of Life" – 7:13
8. "Death of Superman/Dream Sequence No. 1: Flying" – 7:50
9. "Ad Infinitum" – 7:42

- Recorded at Studios La Buisonne, Avignon, France on May 19 & 20, 2007.

== Personnel ==
- Carla Bley – piano
- Paolo Fresu – trumpet, flugelhorn
- Andy Sheppard – soprano saxophone, tenor saxophone
- Steve Swallow – bass guitar
- Billy Drummond – drums
