= Damaged in Transit =

Live album by Steve Swallow, Chis Potter and Adam Nussbaum
- Released: October 14, 2003
- Recorded: December 2001; France
- Genre: Jazz
- Length: 55:20
- Label: Xtra Watt 11
- Producer: Steve Swallow

Steve Swallow chronology
Always Pack Your Uniform on Top (1999)	Damaged in Transit (2003)	L'Histoire du Clochard (2007)

Damaged in Transit is a live album by bassist Steve Swallow recorded on tour in France in December 2001 and released on the Xtra Watt label in 2003.

== Reception ==
Professional ratings
Review scores
Source	Rating
Allmusic	4/5 stars
The Guardian	4/5 stars
The Penguin Guide to Jazz Recordings	3/4 stars

Allmusic awarded the album 4 stars and the review by Thom Jurek states: "Swallow uses the gig forum to explore that preternatural jazz monster: counterpoint. A series of nine numbered items are edited together to sound more or less like one piece; these different selections offer varying sides of the contrapuntal equation. ...each piece is scored in order to provide the maximum opportunity within the melodic structure of a tune for ideas to flow freely as the trio members engage one another. A fine effort.". The Guardian's review by John Fordham said "Damaged In Transit is a no-frills, flat-out, brilliantly executed piece of stylistically-sweeping jazz jamming, with nothing else to listen to but some very long sax solos on very direct and outwardly simple tunes, underpinned by Swallow's elegant bass-playing and Adam Nussbaum's rumbly, Elvin Jones-like drumming". In JazzTimes Stuart Nicholson wrote: "Damaged in Transit is a masterpiece of fin de siecle postbop, a style doomed to perpetual virtuosic recapitulation". BBC reviewer Peter Marsh observed "Swallow's trio engage the head, heart and feet with their unpretentious yet cerebral swing. Unreservedly recommended". On All About Jazz Mark F. Turner noted: "The musical chemistry between the musicians is clear and each one accentuates the other's performance on Damaged in Transit. Recorded live in France in 2001, the concert seems to focus loosely on blending melodies with keen interaction". In Jazz Review John Kelman wrote: "A significant change from the quintet format, this may be Swallow’s most intensely engaging album in a career that spans over forty years... What is remarkable about Damaged in Transit is how full the trio sounds. With each instrument always finding its place in an ever-shifting environment, harmonies that are not played seem somehow implied. ...this is an album that continues to cement Swallow’s reputation as a writer and bandleader. Walking away from his comfort zone, Swallow enters new territory with Damaged in Transit, and meets it head-on with his usual confidence and dry sense of humour". PopMatters Robert R. Calder noted "this CD opens with the most straightforward unpretentious swinging jazz, and never leaves it behind. That’s one clue to its success, although overall the set is, well, chaste or spare or classical in texture and atmosphere. ...The music here is very big on harmony, on the grand underlying plan".

== Track listing ==
All compositions by Steve Swallow.

1. "Item 1, D.I.T." - 6:24
2. "Item 2, D.I.T." - 7:15
3. "Item 3, D.I.T." - 6:08
4. "Item 4, D.I.T." - 6:35
5. "Item 5, D.I.T." - 7:19
6. "Item 6, D.I.T." - 6:04
7. "Item 7, D.I.T." - 4:49
8. "Item 8, D.I.T." - 4:56
9. "Item 9, D.I.T." - 5:50

== Personnel ==
- Steve Swallow - bass guitar
- Chris Potter - tenor saxophone
- Adam Nussbaum - drums
