= Gary Valente =

American jazz trombonist (born 1953)

Gary Valente (born June 26, 1953) is a jazz trombonist.

== Early life ==
Valente was born on June 26, 1953, in Worcester, Massachusetts. He started playing the trombone as a young child, encouraged by his father, who played the same instrument. In the 1970s he studied at the New England Conservatory of Music, with Jaki Byard, and recorded with the conservatory's Jazz Repertory Orchestra.

== Later life and career ==
Valente became a prominent figure in contemporary big band jazz, as a member of bands led by Carla Bley, Lester Bowie, Chico O'Farrill, and George Russell. He has also played in a diverse range of smaller groups, including those led by Don Byron, Cab Calloway, Charlie Haden, Joe Lovano, and Andy Sheppard.

As a leader, he had a small band with tenor saxophonist Bob Hanlon in the late 1980s and co-founded Slideride with other trombonists in 1994. At the end of the 1990s he led a quintet that featured Lew Soloff.

== Discography ==
With Carla Bley

- Social Studies (Watt, 1981)
- Live! (Watt, 1982)
- I Hate to Sing (Watt, 1984)
- Heavy Heart (Watt, 1984)
- Fleur Carnivore (Watt, 1989)
- The Very Big Carla Bley Band (Watt, 1991)
- Big Band Theory (Watt, 1993)
- The Carla Bley Big Band Goes to Church (Watt, 1996)
- 4x4 (Watt, 2000)
- Looking for America (Watt, 2003)
- Appearing Nightly (Watt, 2008)

With Lester Bowie

- The Odyssey of Funk & Popular Music (Atlantic, 1998)
- When the Spirit Returns (Warner/Birdology, 2000)

With George Gruntz

- Global Excellence (TCB, 2001)
- Tiger by the Tail (TCB, 2006)
- Pourquoi Pas? Why Not? (TCB, 2008)

With Joe Lovano

- Worlds (Label Bleu, 1990)
- Viva Caruso (Blue Note, 2002)

With Nick Mason

- Nick Mason's Fictitious Sports (Harvest, 1981)
- Unattended Luggage (Parlophone, 2018)

With Arturo O'Farrill

- Song for Chico (Zoho, 2008)
- Final Night at Birdland (Zoho, 2013)

With Chico O'Farrill

- Heart of a Legend (Milestone, 1999)
- Carambola (Milestone, 2000)

With Ed Schuller

- Life Cycle (GM, 1982)
- The Eleventh Hour (Tutu, 1992)
- To Know Where One Is (Power Bros 1994)
- The Force (Tutu, 1996)

With Andy Sheppard

- Soft on the Inside (Antilles, 1990)
- Rhythm Method (Blue Note, 1993)
- Delivery Suite (Blue Note, 1994)

With others

- Ray Anderson, Craig Harris and George Lewis, Slideride (hat ART, 1995)
- Charlie Haden, The Ballad of the Fallen (ECM, 1983)
- Defunkt, Live in Europe (2002)
- George Russell, New York Big Band (Soul Note, 1982)
- George Schuller, Lookin' Up from Down Below (GM, 1989)
- Joseph Daley, The Seven Deadly Sins (Jaro, 2010)
- Karen Mantler, Karen Mantler's Pet Project (Virgin 2000)
- Orange Then Blue, Music for Jazz Orchestra (GM, 1987)
- Robert Wyatt, Different Every Time (Domino, 2014)
- Sara Lee, Make It Beautiful (Righteous Babe, 2000)
- Steve Weisberg, I Can't Stand Another Night Alone (XtraWATT, 1986)
- Tony Dagradi, Oasis (Gramavision, 1980)
