= Easy as Pie (Gary Burton album) =

Studio album by the Gary Burton Quartet
- Released: March 1981
- Recorded: June 1980
- Studio: Tonstudio Bauer; Ludwigsburg, West Germany
- Genre: Jazz
- Length: 47:44
- Label: ECM 1184
- Producer: Manfred Eicher

Gary Burton chronology
In Concert, Zürich, October 28, 1979 (1980)	Easy as Pie (1981)	Picture This (1982)

Easy as Pie is an album by the Gary Burton Quartet, recorded in June 1980 and released on ECM March the following year. The quartet features alto saxophonist James Odgren and rhythm section Steve Swallow and Michael Hyman.

== Reception ==
The AllMusic review by Scott Yanow stated: "The repertoire is stronger and less introverted than usual... Swinging sections alternate with more thoughtful pieces, resulting in a particularly well-rounded set."

Professional ratings
Review scores
Source	Rating
AllMusic	3/5 stars
The Rolling Stone Jazz Record Guide	4/5 stars

== Track listing ==
All compositions by Chick Corea except as indicated

1. "Reactionary Tango" (Carla Bley) - 11:40
2. "Tweek" - 5:34
3. "Blame It on My Youth" (Oscar Levant, Edward Heyman) - 5:43
4. "Summer Band Camp" (Mick Goodrick) - 7:47
5. "Isfahan" (Billy Strayhorn, Duke Ellington) - 8:05
6. "Stardancer" - 8:55

== Personnel ==
- Gary Burton – vibraphone
- Jim Odgren – alto saxophone
- Steve Swallow – electric bass
- Mike Hyman – drums
