= Picture This (Gary Burton album) =

Studio album by the Gary Burton Quartet
- Released: November 1982
- Recorded: January 1982
- Studio: Columbia, New York City
- Genre: Jazz
- Length: 44:47
- Label: ECM 1226
- Producer: Hans Wendl

Gary Burton chronology
Easy as Pie (1981)	Picture This (1982)	Lyric Suite for Sextet (1983)

Picture This is an album the Gary Burton Quartet, recorded in January 1982 and released on ECM in November. The quartet features alto saxophonist Jim Odgren and rhythm section Steve Swallow and Mike Hyman, a stable lineup in the early 1980s.

== Reception ==
The AllMusic review by Scott Yanow stated that "Burton always had the ability to blend in with nearly anyone, and the alto/vibes frontline is attractive... Well-played, if not overly memorable music."

Professional ratings
Review scores
Source	Rating
AllMusic	3/5 stars
The Rolling Stone Jazz Record Guide	3/5 stars

== Track listing ==
1. "Tanglewood '63" (Michael Gibbs) - 9:00
2. "Waltz" (Chick Corea) - 6:00
3. "Dreams So Real" (Carla Bley) - 7:14
4. "Tierra del Fuego" (Jim Odgren) - 7:07
5. "Duke Ellington's Sound of Love" (Charles Mingus) - 8:13
6. "Skylight" (Odgren) - 7:13

== Personnel ==
- Gary Burton – vibraphone
- Jim Odgren – alto saxophone
- Steve Swallow – electric bass
- Mike Hyman – drums
