= Big Band Theory =

Studio album by Carla Bley
- Released: 1993
- Recorded: July 2–3, 1993
- Genre: Jazz
- Length: 49:09
- Label: Watt/ECM
- Producer: Carla Bley

Carla Bley chronology
Go Together (1992)	Big Band Theory (1993)	Songs with Legs (1994)

Big Band Theory is an album by the American composer, bandleader and keyboardist Carla Bley, recorded and released on the Watt/ECM label in 1993.

== Reception ==
The AllMusic review by Scott Yanow stated that "overall this set (which is enjoyable enough) is less memorable than one would expect from Carla Bley". The Penguin Guide to Jazz awarded it 3 stars, stating: "This never quite fulfils the promise of some exciting arrangements and a rah of hot solists".

Professional ratings
Review scores
Source	Rating
AllMusic	3/5 stars
Tom Hull	B+
The Penguin Guide to Jazz	3/4 stars

== Track listing ==
All compositions by Carla Bley except as indicated

1. "On the Stage in Cages" - 12:39
2. "Birds of Paradise" - 20:21
3. "Goodbye Pork Pie Hat" (Charles Mingus) - 8:38
4. "Fresh Impression" - 7:39
- Recorded at Angel Recording Studios, London on July 2 & 3, 1993.

== Personnel ==
- Carla Bley - piano
- Alex Balanescu - violin
- Lew Soloff, Guy Barker, Claude Deppa, Steve Waterman - trumpet
- Gary Valente, Richard Edwards, Annie Whitehead - trombone
- Ashley Slater - bass trombone
- Roger Janotta - flute, soprano saxophone
- Wolfgang Puschnig - alto saxophone, flute
- Andy Sheppard - tenor saxophone, soprano saxophone
- Pete Hurt tenor saxophone
- Julian Argüelles - baritone saxophone
- Karen Mantler - organ
- Steve Swallow - bass guitar
- Dennis Mackrel - drums
