= Deconstructed (Steve Swallow album) =

Studio album by Steve Swallow
- Released: June 2, 1997
- Recorded: December 1996
- Studio: Grog Kill Studio, Willow, NY
- Genre: Jazz
- Label: Xtra Watt 9
- Producer: Steve Swallow

Steve Swallow chronology
Parlance (1995)	Deconstructed (1997)	Are We There Yet? (1998)

Deconstructed is an album by the bassist Steve Swallow, released on the Xtra Watt label in 1997.

== Reception ==
Professional ratings
Review scores
Source	Rating
AllMusic	4.5/5 stars
The Penguin Guide to Jazz Recordings	3/4 stars

The AllMusic review by Scott Yanow states: "This CD by electric bassist Steve Swallow is a major surprise, for his ten originals are essentially bebop, often using chord changes that sound familiar... This rare straight-ahead outing by Steve Swallow sounds fresh, lively, and creative, and it is one of his most rewarding recordings as a leader."

== Track listing ==
All compositions by Steve Swallow.

1. "Running in the Family" - 5:10
2. "Babble On" - 3:44
3. "Another Fine Mess" - 6:48
4. "I Think My Wife Is a Hat" - 5:45
5. "Bird World War" - 3:20
6. "Bug in a Rug" - 6:09
7. "Lost in Boston" - 5:00
8. "Name That Tune" - 5:39
9. "Viscous Consistency" - 6:02
10. "Deconstructed" - 5:30

== Personnel ==
- Steve Swallow – bass guitar
- Ryan Kisor – trumpet
- Chris Potter – tenor saxophone
- Mick Goodrick – guitar
- Adam Nussbaum – drums
