= 4x4 (Carla Bley album) =

4 x 4

Studio album by Carla Bley
- Released: 2000
- Recorded: July 1999
- Genre: Jazz
- Label: Watt/ECM
- Producers: Carla Bley & Steve Swallow

Carla Bley chronology
| Are We There Yet? (1998) | 4 x 4 (2000) | Looking for America (2002) |

4 x 4 is an album by American composer, bandleader and keyboardist Carla Bley with a chamber ensemble recorded in Oslo in 1999 and released on the Watt/ECM label in 2000.

== Reception ==
The Allmusic review by David R. Adler awarded the album 3 stars and stated "This batch of compositions is informed by Bley's distinctive brand of tongue-in-cheek playfulness... While the entire eight-piece band is consistently a pleasure, some of the album's most appealing moments occur during several Bley/Swallow duet passages. The two have been performing and recording as a duo for many years, so in a certain sense the whole band seems to revolve around them". The JazzTimes review by Aaron Steinberg said "Between gigs, the ruddy and no doubt road weary outfit took a time-out in Oslo to record 4 x 4. Bley and the band sound happy to have the time to themselves, and they mostly take it easy on light-hearted tunes with fun but simple arrangements". The Penguin Guide to Jazz awarded it 3 1/2 stars stating "with music as impressive and as ambitious as this, who's complaining? "

Professional ratings
Review scores
| Source | Rating |
|---|---|
| Allmusic | 3/5 stars |
| Penguin Guide to Jazz | 3.5/4 stars |
| Tom Hull | B+ |

== Track listing ==
All tracks are written by Carla Bley.

| No. | Title | Length |
|---|---|---|
| 1. | "Blues in 12 Bars / Blues in 12 Other Bars" | 14:32 |
| 2. | "Sidewinders in Paradise" | 8:36 |
| 3. | "Les Trois Lagons (d'apres Henri Matisse): Plate XVII/Plate XVIII/Plate XIX" | 15:37 |
| 4. | "Baseball" | 7:48 |
| 5. | "Útviklingssang" | 9:18 |

- Recorded at Rainbow Studio, Oslo in July 1999.

== Personnel ==
- Carla Bley – piano
- Lew Soloff – trumpet
- Wolfgang Puschnig – alto saxophone
- Andy Sheppard – tenor saxophone
- Gary Valente – trombone
- Larry Goldings – organ
- Steve Swallow – bass guitar
- Victor Lewis – drums
