= Fancy Chamber Music =

Studio album by Carla Bley
- Released: June 22, 1998
- Recorded: December 5–6, 1997
- Genre: Jazz
- Length: 53:04
- Label: Watt/ECM
- Producer: Carla Bley & Steve Swallow

Carla Bley chronology
The Carla Bley Big Band Goes to Church (1996)	Fancy Chamber Music (1998)	Are We There Yet? (1998)

Fancy Chamber Music is an album by the American composer, bandleader and keyboardist Carla Bley, recorded in England in 1997 and released on the Watt/ECM label in 1998.

== Reception ==
The AllMusic review by Tim Sheridan stated: "Always the iconoclast, here pianist Bley applies her keen musical skill on baroque and chamber styles with tongue firmly in cheek and a fine string section to set the mood". The Penguin Guide to Jazz stated: "Very little to separate the fancy from the funky. Vintage Bley".

Professional ratings
Review scores
Source	Rating
AllMusic	4/5 stars
The Penguin Guide to Jazz	3/4 stars
Tom Hull	B

== Track listing ==
All compositions by Carla Bley.

1. "Wolfgang Tango" - 14:29
2. "Romantic Notion No. 4" - 2:26
3. "End of Vienna" - 9:00
4. "Tigers in Training" - 19:02
5. "Romantic Notion No. 6" - 1:05
6. "Jon Benet" - 7:17
- Recorded at SnakeRanch Studio, London, England on December 5 & 6, 1997.

== Personnel ==
- Carla Bley - piano
- Steve Morris - violin
- Andrew Byrt - viola
- Emma Black - cello
- Steve Swallow - bass
- Alison Hayhurst - flute
- Sara Lee - clarinet, glockenspiel
- Chris Wells - percussion
