= Are We There Yet? (Carla Bley album) =

Live album by Carla Bley & Steve Swallow
- Released: June 21, 1999
- Recorded: October 1998
- Genre: Jazz
- Label: Watt/ECM
- Producer: Carla Bley & Steve Swallow

Carla Bley chronology
| Fancy Chamber Music (1997) | Are We There Yet? (1999) | 4 x 4 (1999) |

Steve Swallow chronology
| Deconstructed (1996) | Are We There Yet? (1998) | Always Pack Your Uniform on Top (1999) |

Are We There Yet? is a live album of duets by American composer, arranger, bandleader and keyboardist Carla Bley and bassist Steve Swallow recorded in Europe in 1998 and released on the Watt/ECM label in 1999. It is the pair's third duet recording following Duets (1988) and Go Together (1992).

== Reception ==
The Allmusic review by David R. Adler awarded the album 4 stars and stated "Bley's piano is remarkably versatile and passionate, and Swallow's signature electric bass sound tickles the senses". The JazzTimes review by Bill Bennett said "Bley on piano is by no means a virtuoso, leaving the solo chores to Swallow-certainly not a bad thing, in and of itself. And Bley plays like the composer that she is, with a wry sense of humor and a comprehensive sense of intent that gives its piece both intellectual and emotional weight".

Professional ratings
Review scores
| Source | Rating |
|---|---|
| Allmusic | 4/5 stars |
| The Penguin Guide to Jazz Recordings | 3/4 stars |
| Tom Hull | B+ |

== Track listing ==
All compositions by Carla Bley except where noted.

1. "Major" - 3:36
2. "A Dog's Life" (Steve Swallow) - 7:15
3. "Satie for Two" (Swallow) - 8:42
4. "Lost in the Stars" (Kurt Weill) - 5:16
5. "King Korn" - 4:38
6. "Playing With Water" (Swallow) - 4:42
7. "Musique Mecanique" - 13:25
- Recorded on tour in Europe in October 1998.

== Personnel ==
- Carla Bley - piano
- Steve Swallow - bass guitar
