= Life Goes On (Carla Bley album) =

Studio album by Carla Bley
- Released: February 14, 2020
- Recorded: May 2019
- Studio: Auditorio Stelio Molo RSI; Lugano, Switzerland
- Genre: Jazz
- Length: 56:39
- Label: ECM; ECM 2669
- Producer: Manfred Eicher

Carla Bley chronology
Andando el Tiempo (2016)	Life Goes On (2020)

Professional ratings
Review scores
Source	Rating
The Absolute Sound	5/5 stars
All About Jazz	4/5 stars
Allmusic	4/5 stars
DownBeat	5/5 stars
The Guardian	4/5 stars
Jazz Journal	5/5 stars
Jazz Trail	A-
Tom Hull	B+

Life Goes On is a studio album by American composer and pianist Carla Bley recorded in May 2019 and released on ECM on February 14, 2020. The trio features saxophonist Andy Sheppard and bass guitarist Steve Swallow.

== Reception ==
Jim Macnie of JazzTimes stated, "The fourth album in a quarter-century’s worth of collabs by the buoyant trio of the pianist, bassist Steve Swallow, and saxophonist Andy Sheppard, Life Goes On teems with the kind of balance that has marked their previous discs, but it also boasts an extra dose of eloquence... The group’s chemistry is ultra-refined at this late date; the carefully calibrated sharing of duties brings a quizzical serenity to this improv-slanted chamber music."

Brian Payne of Jazz Journal commented, "Bley is distinctive on piano throughout the album, Sheppard supple and circuitous on tenor and soprano sax and Swallow rich, warm and melodic on bass. Bley says 'We’re essentially a chamber music ensemble and this allows me to write music for us free of bombast and exaggeration.' If you add 'quirky,' 'original' and 'politically incorrect,' I think her words would likely trump any other description of this most intriguing album."

Paul de Barros in his review for DownBeat wrote, "During Bley’s long and rich career, there have been times when her work has merely seemed smart, but not emotionally resonant. Here, it’s both, and her trio is all in for life—as long as it lasts."

== Track listing ==
All tracks are written by Carla Bley.

No.	Title	Length
1.	"Life Goes On: Life Goes On"	6:00
2.	"Life Goes On: On"	4:46
3.	"Life Goes On: And On"	4:10
4.	"Life Goes On: And Then One Day"	9:02
5.	"Beautiful Telephones I"	4:35
6.	"Beautiful Telephones II"	6:13
7.	"Beautiful Telephones III"	6:16
8.	"Copycat: After You"	5:29
9.	"Copycat: Follow the Leader"	0:17
10.	"Copycat: Copycat"	9:51
Total length:		56:39

== Personnel ==
- Carla Bley – piano
- Andy Sheppard – soprano saxophone, tenor saxophone
- Steve Swallow – bass guitar
