= Andando el Tiempo =

Studio album by Carla Bley / Andy Sheppard / Steve Swallow
- Released: May 6, 2016
- Recorded: November 2015
- Studios: Auditorio Stelio Molo, RSI, Lugano
- Genre: Jazz
- Length: 47:16
- Labels: ECM; ECM 2485
- Producer: Manfred Eicher

Carla Bley chronology
Trios (2013)	Andando el Tiempo (2016)	Life Goes On (2020)

Andando el Tiempo is an album by American composer and pianist Carla Bley with saxophonist Andy Sheppard and bass guitarist Steve Swallow released on the ECM label. Though the musicians are longtime collaborators, this is their third album as a trio and second on the ECM label. It is Bley's first complete album of new compositions in eight years and is titled after a three part meditation on addiction and recovery, inspired by a friend's struggle with alcoholism.

== Reception ==
Professional ratings
Review scores
Source	Rating
Allmusic	3.5/5 stars
The Guardian	4/5 stars
All About Jazz	4.5/5 stars
Elmore	80/100
Jazz Journal	4/5 stars
The Irish Times	4/5 stars
Pitchfork	7.8/10
Tom Hull	B+

In The New York Times, Nate Chinen called the album "Chamberlike and willowy, suffused with melancholy, it reflects her sly noncompliance with jazz and classical conventions, which has been a prevalent theme of her half-century career". Allmusic awarded the album 3½ stars and said it was "a delicately passionate, classically influenced set" and that "Ultimately, it's that shared intensity, born out of the trio's decades-long partnership, that makes Andando el Tiempo such an engaging listen". They also selected it as one of their Favorite Jazz Albums of 2016.

Many reviews compared it to the trio's previous release. Writing in The Guardian, John Fordham observed "A more personal, private and succinct album than its predecessor, Trios, it’s just as captivating, and inconceivable in the hands of anyone else". The All About Jazz review by John Kelman said it was "an album of largely introspective music that shares much with its predecessor, but also acts as a flip side of the same coin" and credited the producer stating "Eicher's own ear for detail renders both Trios and Andando el Tiempo as more sonically open, with greater clarity across the layers produced by these three players...and the room in which they recorded, live, without any baffling or separation Another review by Karl Ackerman stated "the collection is as fine a small-group recording as Bley has produced in her career. While she has mastered all characteristics of musical narrative, here she has minimized the levity and occasional excesses in favor of warmth and class. It is a beautiful album".

Bley's playing was noted by Cormac Larkin of The Irish Times who said "it is Bley the pianist who seems particularly liberated by the different arrangement, and the playing – from a woman who once described herself as 1 per cent player, 99 per cent composer – is moving and starkly lyrical". The Wall Street Journal's Martin Johnson called the album "'a showcase for Ms. Bley’s intimate music, and it features superb, reserved performances in a trio setting featuring two longtime collaborators... their rapport is easy to hear; there are few unaccompanied solos, and most of the interplay sounds intuitive and spontaneous rather than composed... Unlike many pianists, Ms. Bley isn’t a flamboyant soloist; instead her style pushes the music gently into new realms." In JazzIz, Lean Crowley stated "Her playing on Andando el Tiempo is, arguably, better than ever. Her typical quirk is slightly subsided for something much deeper and more intimate" Pitchfork's Seth Colter Walls said "At 80 years of age, she remains an individual—and still composes like a born melodist, too".

== Track listing ==
All compositions by Carla Bley.

1. "Sin Fin" - 10:21
2. "Potación de Guaya" - 9:48
3. "Camino al volver" - 8:27
4. "Saints Alive!" - 8:35
5. "Naked Bridges/Diving Brides" - 10:05

== Personnel ==
- Carla Bley – piano
- Andy Sheppard – soprano saxophone, tenor saxophone
- Steve Swallow – bass guitar
