= Steve Swallow =

American jazz bassist and composer (born 1940)

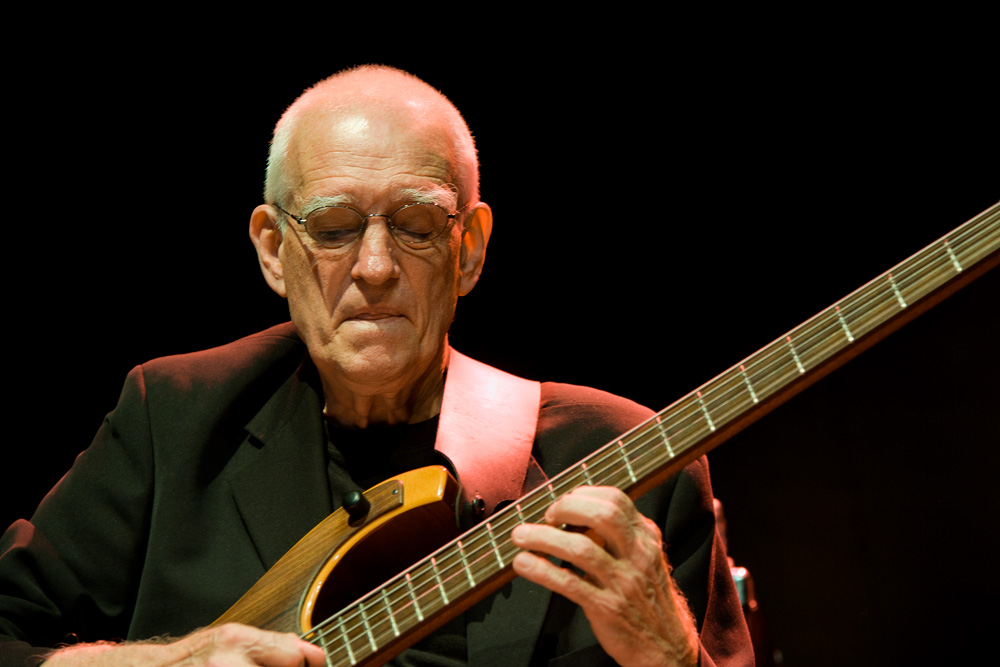
- Swallow at Moers Festival, Moers, Germany, 2012

Background information
- Born: October 4, 1940 (age 85); Fair Lawn, New Jersey, U.S.
- Genres: Jazz; fusion
- Occupations: Musician, composer, educator
- Instruments: Electric bass guitar, double bass
- Years active: 1960–present
- Labels: Palmetto, RCA, Atlantic, WATT, Blue Note, Winter & Winter, Verve, Impulse!

Steve Swallow (born October 4, 1940) is an American jazz bassist and composer, known for his collaborations with Jimmy Giuffre, Gary Burton, and Carla Bley. He was one of the first jazz double bassists to switch entirely to electric bass guitar.

== Biography ==
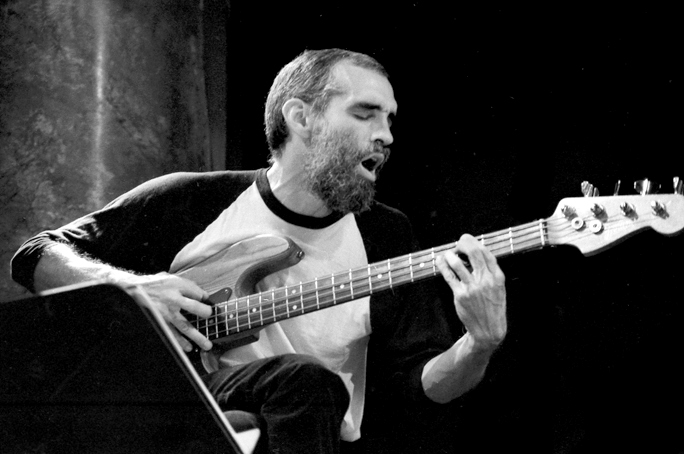
Swallow in San Francisco, 1981

Born in Fair Lawn, New Jersey, United States, Swallow studied piano and trumpet, as a child, before turning to the double bass at the age of 14. While attending a prep school, he began trying his hand in jazz improvisation. In 1960, he left Yale University, where he was studying composition, and settled in New York City, playing at the time in Jimmy Giuffre's trio along with Paul Bley. After joining Art Farmer's quartet in 1963, Swallow began to write. It is in the 1960s that his long-term association with Gary Burton's various bands began.

In the early 1970s, Swallow switched exclusively to electric bass guitar, of which he prefers the five-string variety. He was first introduced to the electric bass while doing a music trade show with Gary Burton and trying a Gibson EB-2. Along with Monk Montgomery and Bob Cranshaw, Swallow was among the first jazz bassists to do so (with much encouragement from Roy Haynes, one of Swallow's favorite drummers). He plays with a pick (made of copper by Hotlicks), and his style involves intricate solos in the upper register. He was one of the early adopters of the high C string on a bass guitar.

From 1974 to 1976, Swallow taught at the Berklee College of Music. He contributed several of his compositions to the Berklee students who assembled the first edition of The Real Book. He later recorded an album, Real Book, with the picture of a well-worn, coffee-stained book on the cover.

In 1978, Swallow became a member of Carla Bley's band. He was Bley's romantic partner from the 1980s until her death in 2023. He toured extensively with John Scofield in the early 1980s, and has returned to this collaboration several times over the years.

Swallow has consistently won the electric bass category in DownBeat yearly polls, both Critics' and Readers', since the mid-1980s. His compositions have been covered by, among others, Jim Hall (who recorded his first tune, "Eiderdown"), Bill Evans, Chick Corea, Stan Getz and Gary Burton. Swallow's instruments are built by Harvey Citron.

== Partial discography ==
=== As leader/co-leader ===
- Hotel Hello with Gary Burton (ECM, 1974)
- Home – music to poems by Robert Creeley (ECM, 1980)
- Night-Glo with Carla Bley (Watt, 1985)
- Carla (Xtra Watt, 1987)
- Duets with Carla Bley (Watt, 1988)
- The Life of a Trio: Saturday with Paul Bley and Jimmy Giuffre (Owl, 1989)
- The Life of a Trio: Sunday with Paul Bley and Jimmy Giuffre (Owl, 1989)
- Swallow (Xtra Watt, 1991)
- Go Together with Carla Bley (Watt, 1992)
- Real Book (Xtra Watt, 1993)
- Songs with Legs (Watt, 1994) with Carla Bley and Andy Sheppard
- Parlance (Instant Present, 1995) with John Taylor
- Deconstructed (Xtra Watt, 1996)
- Are We There Yet? with Carla Bley (Watt, 1998)
- Always Pack Your Uniform on Top (Xtra Watt/ECM, 2000)
- Noisy Old Men (Jam, 2002) with Mick Goodrick, John Abercrombie, Gary Chaffee
- Damaged in Transit with Chris Potter and Adam Nussbaum (Xtra Watt, 2003)
- So There with Robert Creeley (Xtra Watt, 2006)
- L'Histoire du Clochard with Ohad Talmor (Palmetto, 2007)
- Carla's Christmas Carols with Carla Bley and the Partyka Brass Quintet (Watt, 2009)
- Playing in Traffic with Ohad Talmor and Adam Nussbaum (Auand, 2009)
- Into the Woodwork (Xtra Watt, 2013) – recorded in 2011
- The New Standard with Jamie Saft and Bobby Previte (RareNoise, 2014)
- Loneliness Road with Jamie Saft, Bobby Previte and Iggy Pop (RareNoise, 2017)
- Winter Songs (ECM, 2026)

=== As sideman ===
With Rabih Abou-Khalil

- Blue Camel (Enja, 1992)
- The Sultan's Picnic (Enja, 1994)

With Carla Bley

- 1978: Musique Mecanique (Watt, 1979)
- 1979: Social Studies (Watt, 1980)
- 1980: Live! (Watt, 1981) – live
- 1981–83: I Hate to Sing (Watt, 1984) – live
- 1983: Heavy Heart (Watt, 1984)
- 1986–87: Sextet (Watt, 1987)
- 1988: Fleur Carnivore (Watt, 1989) – live
- 1990: The Very Big Carla Bley Band (Watt, 1991)
- 1993: Big Band Theory (Watt, 1993)
- 1996: The Carla Bley Big Band Goes to Church (Watt, 1996) – live
- 1997: Fancy Chamber Music (Watt, 1998)
- 1999: 4 x 4 (Watt, 2000)
- 2002: Looking for America (Watt, 2003)
- 2003: The Lost Chords (Watt, 2004) – live
- 2006: Appearing Nightly (Watt, 2008) – live
- 2007: The Lost Chords find Paolo Fresu (Watt, 2007)
- 2013: Trios (ECM, 2013)
- 2015: Andando el Tiempo (ECM, 2016)
- 2019: Life Goes On (ECM, 2020)

With Paul Bley

- Footloose! (Savoy, 1963)
- Closer (ESP-Disk, 1966)
- Hot (Soul Note, 1985)

With Gary Burton

- The Groovy Sound of Music (RCA, 1963)
- The Time Machine (RCA, 1966)
- Tennessee Firebird (RCA, 1966)
- Duster (RCA, 1967)
- Lofty Fake Anagram (RCA, 1967)
- A Genuine Tong Funeral (RCA, 1967)
- Gary Burton Quartet in Concert (RCA, 1968)
- Country Roads & Other Places (RCA, 1969)
- Throb (Atlantic, 1969)
- Good Vibes (Atlantic, 1969)
- Paris Encounter (Atlantic, 1969) with Stéphane Grappelli
- Dreams So Real (ECM, 1975)
- Passengers (ECM, 1977)
- Times Square (ECM, 1978)
- Easy as Pie (ECM, 1980)
- Picture This (ECM, 1982)
- Whiz Kids (ECM, 1986)
- Real Life Hits (ECM, 1984)
- Quartet Live (Concord Jazz, 2009)

With Art Farmer

- Interaction (Atlantic, 1963) – with Jim Hall
- Live at the Half-Note (Atlantic, 1963) – with Jim Hall
- To Sweden with Love (Atlantic, 1964) – with Jim Hall
- The Many Faces of Art Farmer (Scepter, 1964)
- Sing Me Softly of the Blues (Atlantic, 1965)

With Jimmy Giuffre

- 1961 (ECM, 1992 – re-issue of the 1961 Verve-albums Fusion & Thesis) – with Paul Bley
- Emphasis, Stuttgart 1961 (hatArt, 1992)
- Flight, Bremen 1961 (hatArt, 1993)
- Graz Live 1961 (ezz-thetics / Hat Hut, 2019)
- Free Fall (Columbia, 1962)

With Steve Kuhn

- Three Waves (Contact, 1966)
- Trance (ECM, 1974)
- Wisteria (ECM, 2012)
- At This Time (Sunnyside, 2016)

With Michael Mantler

- The Jazz Composer's Orchestra (JCOA, 1968)
- The Hapless Child (WATT, 1976)
- Movies (WATT, 1977)
- More Movies (WATT, 1980)
- Something There (WATT, 1982)

With Paul Motian

- Reincarnation of a Love Bird (JMT, 1995)
- Flight of the Blue Jay (Winter & Winter, 1995)
- Trio 2000 + One (Winter & Winter, 1997)
- Play Monk and Powell (Winter & Winter, 1998)

With George Russell

- Ezz-thetics (Riverside, 1961)
- The Stratus Seekers (Riverside, 1962)
- The Outer View (Riverside, 1962)

With John Scofield

- Bar Talk (Arista Novus, 1980)
- Shinola (Enja, 1982)
- Out Like a Light (Enja, 1983)
- I Can See Your House From Here (Blue Note, 1994)
- Quiet (Verve, 1996)
- EnRoute: John Scofield Trio LIVE (Verve, 2004)
- This Meets That (Universal Records, 2007)
- Country for Old Men (Impulse!, 2016)
- Swallow Tales (ECM, 2020)

With others

- Dave Douglas, Riverside (Greenleaf, 2014) – recorded in 2014
- Don Ellis, Out of Nowhere (Candid, 1988) – recorded in 1961
- Pierre Favre, Window Steps (ECM, 1996) – recorded in 1995
- Stan Getz, The Stan Getz Quartet in Paris (Verve, 1967) – live recorded in 1966
- Chico Hamilton, El Exigente: The Demanding One (Flying Dutchman, 1970)
- Tore Johansen, I.S. (Inner Ear, 2010)
- Sheila Jordan, Portrait Of Sheila (Blue Note, 1963)
- Pete La Roca, Basra (Blue Note, 1965)
- Joe Lovano, Universal Language (Blue Note, 1992)
- Gary McFarland, Point of Departure (Impulse!, 1963)
- Pat Metheny and John Scofield, I Can See Your House from Here (Blue Note Records, 1994)
- Jimmy Raney, Jim Hall and Zoot Sims, Two Jims and Zoot (Mainstream, 1964)
- Andy Sheppard, Dancing Man & Woman (Provocateur, 2000)
- Hans Ulrik, Anders Mogensen, Niclas Knudsen, The Meeting (2020)
