= Wisteria (Steve Kuhn album) =

Studio album by Steve Kuhn
- Released: April 20, 2012
- Recorded: September 2011
- Studio: Avatar (New York, New York)
- Genre: Jazz
- Length: 67:21
- Label: ECM; ECM 2257
- Producer: Manfred Eicher

Steve Kuhn chronology
| I Will Wait for You: The Music of Michel Legrand (2010) | Wisteria (2012) | Break of Day (2014) |

Wisteria is a jazz album by pianist Steve Kuhn and his trio, recorded is September 2011 and released on ECM in April the following year.

== Reception ==
Professional ratings
Review scores
| Source | Rating |
|---|---|
| Allmusic | 4/5 stars |
| The Guardian | 4/5 stars |

The AllMusic review by Ken Dryden awarded the album four stars, stating "Steve Kuhn has excelled in many settings in a career spanning over five decades, but he is at his best leading a trio. Like many top pianists, Kuhn interacts with his musicians rather than relegating them exclusively to the role of accompanists... Highly recommended!"

Writing in The Guardian, John Fordham commented "It's straightish jazz, but in a class of its own."

In JazzTimes Lloyd Sachs enthused "The Brooklyn-born, Boston-schooled artist certainly has refined his style over the years, striking new balances between his inside and outside concepts. But if he has lost any of his creative edge, that isn’t evident on Wisteria, which even at its most lyrical has a bright and sometimes bursting immediacy."

The All About Jazz review by John Kelman called it "yet another milestone in Kuhn's discography."

== Track listing ==
All compositions by Steve Kuhn, except where noted.

1. "Chalet" - 6:27
2. "Adagio" - 7:06
3. "Morning Dew" - 6:37
4. "Romance" (Dori Caymmi) - 4:28
5. "Permanent Wave" (Carla Bley) - 6:37
6. "A Likely Story" - 6:45
7. "Pastorale" - 6:15
8. "Wisteria" (Art Farmer) - 5:50
9. "Dark Glasses" (Swallow) - 5:53
10. "Promises Kept" - 5:33
11. "Good Lookin' Rookie" (Swallow) - 5:50

== Personnel ==
- Steve Kuhn – piano
- Steve Swallow – bass guitar
- Joey Baron – drums
