= Looking for America (album) =

Studio album by Carla Bley
- Released: 2003
- Recorded: October 7–8, 2002
- Genre: Jazz
- Label: Watt/ECM
- Producer: Steve Swallow

Carla Bley chronology
4 x 4 (1999)	Looking for America (2003)	The Lost Chords (2003)

Looking for America is an album by American composer, bandleader and keyboardist Carla Bley recorded in 2002 and released on the Watt/ECM label in 2003.

== Reception ==
The Allmusic review by Thom Jurek awarded the album 4 stars and stated "Looking for America is a fun, innovative, and indefatigable album by one of the true geniuses in modern jazz". The JazzTimes review by Harvey Siders said "Inevitably, sardonic wit pervades her search on Looking for America as fragments of "The Star-Spangled Banner" materialize-dreamlike, impressionistically and, above all, whimsically-throughout the CD". The Penguin Guide to Jazz awarded it 3⅓ stars stating "As an exploration of Americana, this is a fine and fun album".

Professional ratings
Review scores
Source	Rating
Allmusic	4/5 stars
Penguin Guide to Jazz	3.5/4 stars

== Track listing ==
All compositions by Carla Bley except where noted.

1. "Grand Mother" - 0:53
2. "The National Anthem: OG Can UC?/Flags/Whose Broad Stripes?/Anthem/Keep It Spangled" - 21:49
3. "Step Mother" - 3:18
4. "Fast Lane" - 5:17
5. "Los Cocineros" - 10:57
6. "Your Mother" - 1:41
7. "Tijuana Traffic" - 8:05
8. "God Mother" - 1:27
9. "Old MacDonald Had a Farm" (Traditional) - 6:15

- Recorded at Avatar Studios, New York, NY on October 7 & 8, 2002.

== Personnel ==
- Carla Bley - piano, conductor
- Earl Gardner, Lew Soloff, Byron Stripling, Giampaolo Casati - trumpet
- Robert Routch - french horn (tracks 1, 3, 6 & 8)
- Jim Pugh, Gary Valente, Dave Bargeron - trombone
- David Taylor - bass trombone
- Lawrence Feldman - alto saxophone, soprano saxophone, flute
- Wolfgang Puschnig - alto saxophone, flute
- Andy Sheppard - tenor saxophone
- Gary Smulyan - baritone saxophone
- Karen Mantler - organ, glockenspiel
- Steve Swallow - bass guitar
- Billy Drummond - drums
- Don Alias - percussion
