= The Very Big Carla Bley Band =

Studio album by Carla Bley
- Released: August 13, 1991
- Recorded: October 29–30, 1990
- Studio: Bauer Studios, Ludwigsburg, Germany
- Genre: Jazz
- Length: 52:41
- Label: Watt/ECM
- Producer: Carla Bley

Carla Bley chronology
Fleur Carnivore (1988)	The Very Big Carla Bley Band (1991)	Go Together (1992)

The Very Big Carla Bley Band is an album by American composer, bandleader and keyboardist Carla Bley released on the Watt/ECM label in 1991.

== Reception ==
The Allmusic review by Brian Olewnick awarded the album 2 1/2 stars and stated "The result is a fairly solid, if slightly bland, date that may cause the listener to pine for her earlier "excesses"... in the end, Bley's themes and structures tend more toward the competent than the stirring or memorable, leaving one desirous of the richer fare that she has served in the past". The Penguin Guide to Jazz awarded it 3 stars, stating "A stirring live outfit the Very Big Band translates well to record, with plenty of emphasis on straightforward blowing from featured soloists".

Professional ratings
Review scores
Source	Rating
Allmusic	2.5/5 stars
Penguin Guide to Jazz	3/4 stars

== Track listing ==
All compositions by Carla Bley.

1. "United States" – 15:32
2. "Strange Arrangement" – 7:46
3. "All Fall Down" – 12:46
4. "Who Will Rescue You?" – 7:12
5. "Lo Ultimo" – 9:25

== Personnel ==
- Carla Bley – piano
- Lew Soloff, Guy Barker, Claude Deppa, Steven Bernstein – trumpet
- Gary Valente, Richard Edwards, Fayyaz Virji – trombone
- Ashley Slater – bass trombone
- Roger Janotta – oboe, flute, clarinet, soprano saxophone
- Wolfgang Puschnig – alto saxophone, flute
- Andy Sheppard – tenor saxophone, soprano saxophone
- Pete Hurt – tenor saxophone, clarinet
- Pablo Calogero – baritone saxophone
- Karen Mantler – organ
- Steve Swallow – bass guitar
- Victor Lewis – drums
- Don Alias – percussion
