= Hotel Hello =

Studio album by Gary Burton & Steve Swallow
- Released: 1975
- Recorded: May 13–14, 1974
- Studio: Aengus Studio; Fayville, Massachusetts
- Genre: Jazz
- Length: 36:00
- Label: ECM 1055 ST
- Producer: Manfred Eicher

Gary Burton chronology
Seven Songs For Quartet And Chamber Orchestra (1974)	Hotel Hello (1975)	Ring (1974)

Hotel Hello is an album by vibraphonist Gary Burton and bassist Steve Swallow recorded over two days in May 1974 and released on ECM the following year.

== Reception ==
Professional ratings
Review scores
Source	Rating
AllMusic	2.5/5 stars
The Penguin Guide to Jazz Recordings	4/4 stars
The Rolling Stone Jazz Record Guide	3/5 stars

The Penguin Guide to Jazz listed the album as part of its suggested "core collection" and described it as "by far the most impressive of Burton's two-handers and an ideal opportunity to examine the vibist in close-ups." They concluded by calling it "one of the high-points of ECM's distinguished catalogue."

In a review for AllMusic, Scott Yanow wrote: "the music is introverted, quiet, and occasionally swinging, but mostly floating... Thoughtful background music with no real surprises or excitement."

Writing for ECM blog Between Sound and Space, Tyran Grillo called the album a "long-forgotten jewel," and commented: "Hotel Hello is a unique entry in the Burton catalogue, for it is the only one that feels as if it were painted in black and white. What it lacks in vibrancy... of color, it makes up for, if not surpasses, in its visceral sentiment.... This is a consistently solid effort and arousing in its many changes."

== Track listing ==
All tracks are written by Steve Swallow except as noted.

Side I
No.	Title	Writer(s)	Length
1.	"Chelsea Bells (for Hern)"		4:25
2.	"Hotel Overture + Vamp"		3:39
3.	"Hotel Hello"		5:24
4.	"Inside In"	Mike Gibbs	2:43
5.	"Domino Biscuit"		1:56

Side II
No.	Title	Writer(s)	Length
1.	"Vashkar"	Carla Bley	5:58
2.	"Sweet Henry"	Jack Gregg; Steve Swallow	4:02
3.	"Impromptu"	Gary Burton; Swallow	2:29
4.	"Sweeping Up"		5:24

== Personnel ==
- Gary Burton – vibraharp, organ, marimba
- Steve Swallow – bass, acoustic piano, electric piano
