= Appearing Nightly =

Live album by Carla Bley and Her Remarkable Big Band
- Released: September 9, 2008
- Recorded: July 17–18, 2006
- Genre: Jazz
- Length: 54:00
- Label: Watt/ECM
- Producer: Carla Bley & Steve Swallow

Carla Bley chronology
The Lost Chords (2003)	Appearing Nightly (2008)	The Lost Chords find Paolo Fresu (2007)

Appearing Nightly is a live album by American composer, bandleader and keyboardist Carla Bley, recorded in Paris in 2006 and released on the Watt/ECM label in 2008. Bley's compositions and arrangements incorporate many references to big bands and jazz standards from the swing era. The album contains two compositions commissioned by the Jazz Orchestra of Sardinia, and a suite inspired by nightclubs and big bands of the 1950s commissioned for the Monterey Jazz Festival.

== Reception ==
The Allmusic review by Thom Jurek awarded the album 4 stars and stated "Ultimately, this is a very enjoyable set, one that begs repeated playing and deeper listening to get all the referent points, at the very least. But the truth is that it is so enjoyable, you'll find yourself getting lost in the music so often you'll forget to check".

The All About Jazz review by C. Michael Bailey said that "Comparisons of Bley's big band talents to Ellington and Charles Mingus are not hyperbole. In a field crowded with every measure of big bands, Carla Bley's Big Band stands as one of the most inventive and unique ensembles" Another review by Budd Kopman stated "Bley has surely succeeded in musically incarnating her past and her love of that music with her ever-present wit and high spirits".

The JazzTimes review by Mike Shanley said "Carla Bley’s humor shapes a good portion of her music, but it never becomes the main focus of a composition... A sly wink, musically speaking, can say so much... the mood ranges from lyrically sentimental to hard swinging on a harmonic area not normally associated with big bands". In June 2009 the well-respected Jazz Journalists Association honored the album with their award Record of the Year.

Professional ratings
Review scores
Source	Rating
Allmusic	4/5 stars

== Track listing ==
All compositions by Carla Bley.

1. "Greasy Gravy" - 8:50
2. "Awful Coffee" - 6:11
3. "Appearing Nightly at the Black Orchid: 40 On-20 Off/Second Round/What Would You Like to Hear/Last Call" - 25:23
4. "Someone to Watch" - 5:56
5. "I Hadn't Anyone 'Till You" (Ray Noble) - 7:38
- Recorded live at New Morning in Paris on July 17 & 18, 2006.

== Personnel ==
- Carla Bley - piano
- Earl Gardner, Lew Soloff, Florian Esch - trumpet
- Beppe Calamosca, Gary Valente, Gigi Grata - trombone
- Richard Henry - bass trombone
- Roger Jannotta - soprano saxophone, alto saxophone, flute
- Wolfgang Puschnig - alto saxophone, flute
- Andy Sheppard, Christophe Panzani - tenor saxophone
- Julian Argüelles - baritone saxophone
- Karen Mantler - organ
- Steve Swallow - bass guitar
- Billy Drummond - drums
