= Carla's Christmas Carols =

Studio album by Carla Bley, Steve Swallow and the Partyka Brass Quintet
- Released: November 3, 2009
- Recorded: December 4–9, 2008
- Genre: Jazz
- Label: Watt/ECM
- Producer: Steve Swallow

Carla Bley chronology
The Lost Chords find Paolo Fresu (2007)	Carla's Christmas Carols (2009)	Trios (2013)

Carla's Christmas Carols is an album of Christmas carols arranged by American composer, bandleader and keyboardist Carla Bley with bassist Steve Swallow and the Partyka Brass Quintet, recorded in France in 2008 and released on the Watt/ECM label in 2009.

== Reception ==
The AllMusic review by Thom Jurek awarded the album four stars and stated, "While the argument that there should be a moratorium on Christmas recordings is a good one in the 21st century, Carla's Christmas Carols provides a powerful counter to that view. She has added so much to these songs without taking away any of the warmth, joy, and nostalgia inherent to the season or their place in it".

The All About Jazz review by John Kelman said that "Most Christmas albums are only good for a limited time each year. The songs Bley has chosen may have such iconic significance as to be tied to a specific time of year, but the arrangements and playing are so good that Carla's Christmas Carols transcends the season for which it's intended; an album that will also bring more than a little welcome cool to the heat of the summer."

Professional ratings
Review scores
Source	Rating
Allmusic	4/5 stars
Tom Hull	B+

== Track listing ==
1. "O Tannenbaum" (Traditional) - 2:30
2. "Away in a Manger" (James R. Murray) - 5:54
3. "The Christmas Song" (Mel Torme, Bob Wells) - 5:15
4. "Ring Christmas Bells" (Mykola Leontovych) - 5:49
5. "God Rest Ye Merry Gentlemen Part 1" (Traditional) - 4:47
6. "God Rest Ye Merry Gentlemen Part 2" (Traditional) - 5:19
7. "It Came Upon a Midnight Clear" (Richard Storrs Willis, Edmund Sears) - 4:57
8. "Hell's Bells" (Carla Bley) - 5:13
9. "Jesus Maria" (Bley) - 8:33
10. "Jingle Bells" (James Pierpont) - 3:06
11. "O Holy Night" (Adolphe Adam, Placide Cappeau) - 7:29
12. "Joy to the World" (Lowell Mason, Isaac Watts) - 1:38

Recorded at La Buissonne Studios, Avignon, France on December 4–9, 2008.

== Personnel ==
- Carla Bley - piano, celeste
- Steve Swallow - bass guitar, chimes
- Tobias Weidinger - trumpet, flugelhorn, glockenspiel
- Axel Schlosser - trumpet, flugelhorn, chimes
- Christine Chapman - horn
- Adrian Mears - trombone
- Ed Partyka - bass trombone, tuba
