= Andy Sheppard =

British jazz saxophonist and composer

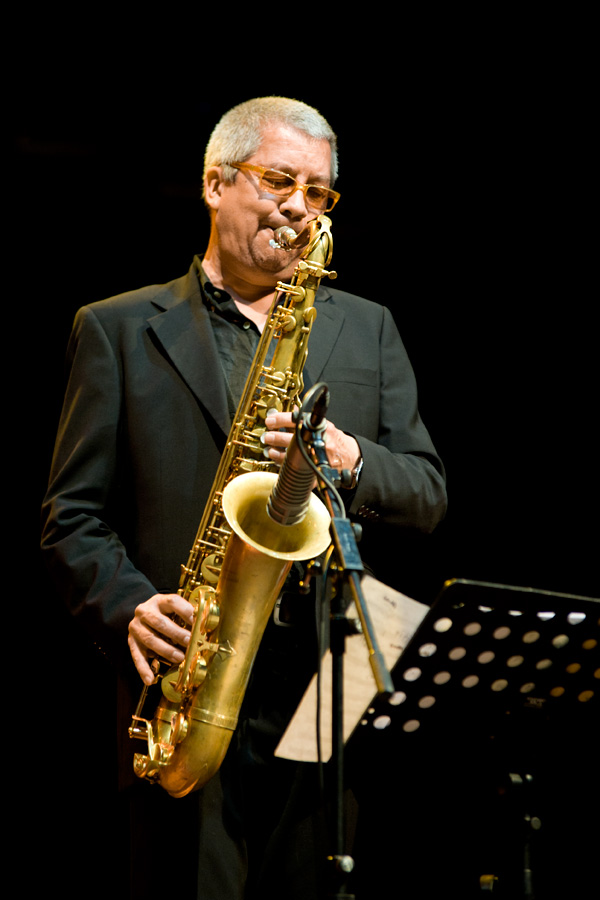
- Sheppard performing 2012

Background information
- Born: 20 January 1957 (age 69); Warminster, Wiltshire, England
- Genres: Jazz
- Occupation: Musician
- Instruments: Tenor saxophone, Soprano saxophone
- Years active: 1978–present
- Website: Official website

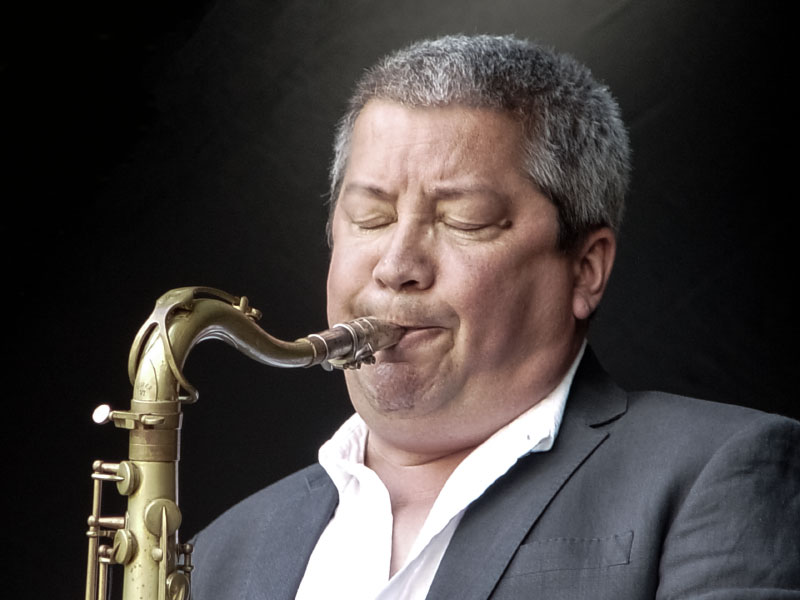
Sheppard at Aarhus Jazz Festival (Denmark 2009)

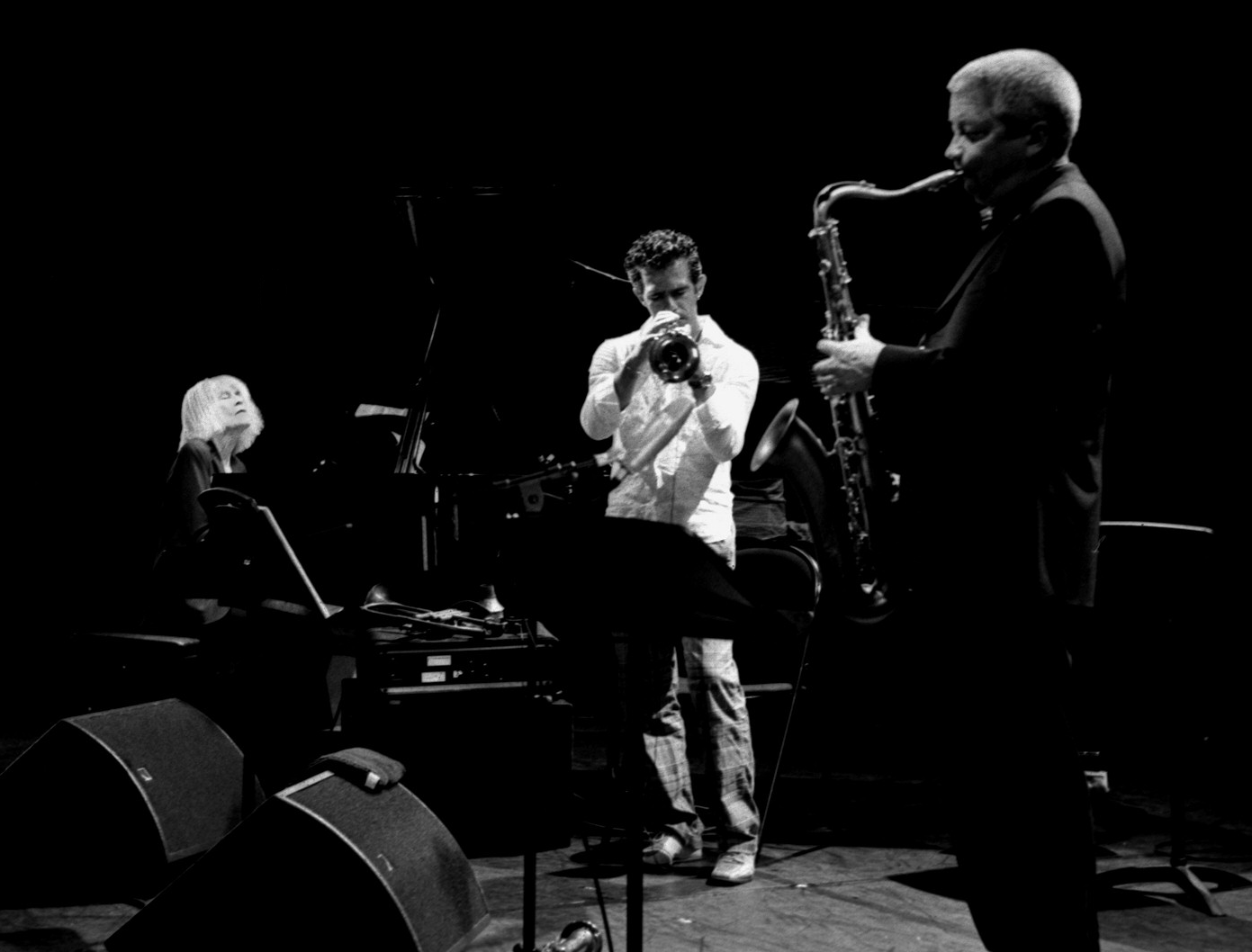
Sheppard (right) in Monaco with Carla Bley and Paolo Fresu

Andy Sheppard (born 20 January 1957) is a British jazz saxophonist and composer. He has been awarded several prizes at the British Jazz Awards, and has worked with some notable figures in contemporary jazz, including Gil Evans, Carla Bley, George Russell and Steve Swallow. In 2019 he was presented the degree of Doctor of Music honoris causa by the University of Bristol.

== Biography ==
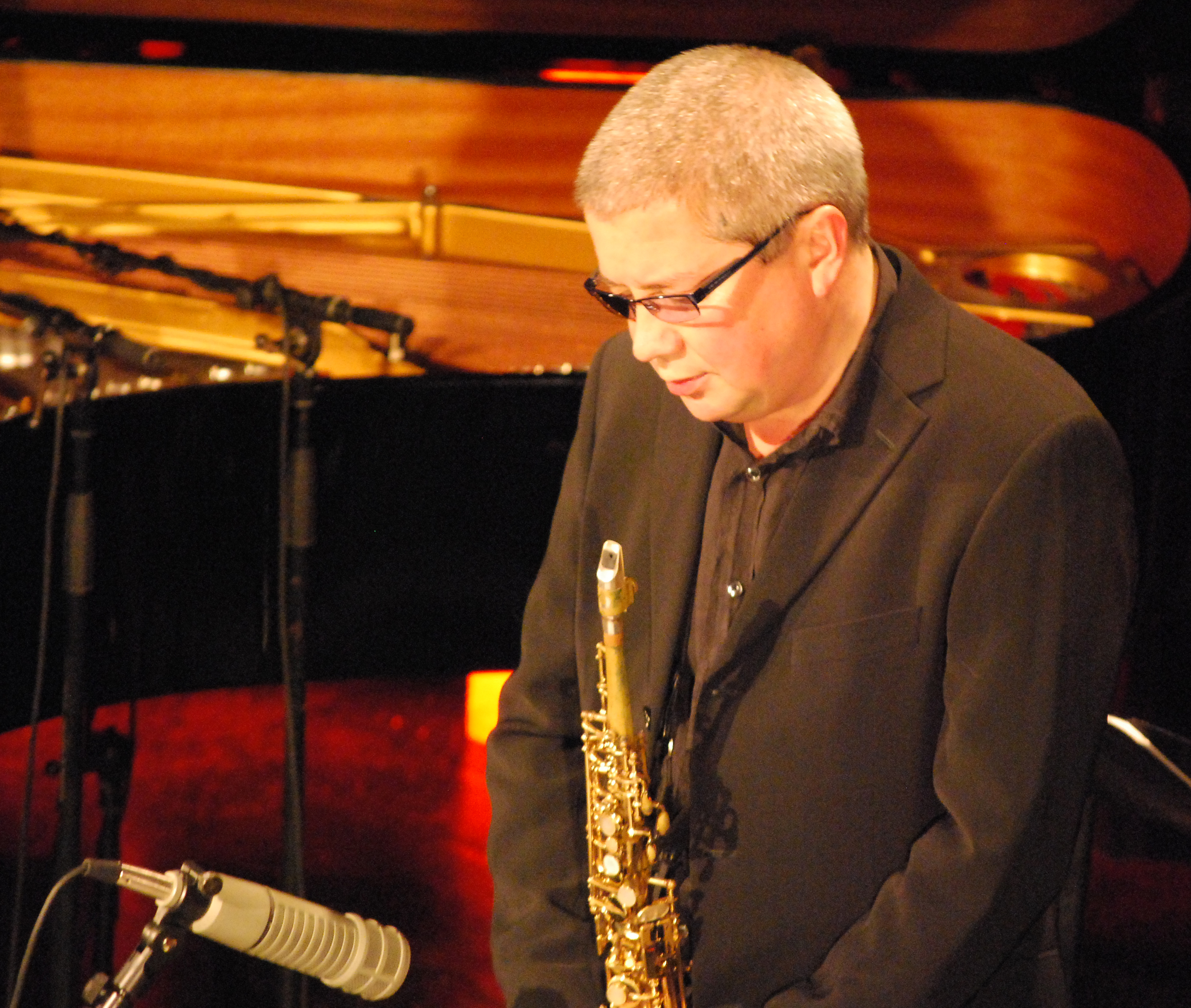
Sheppard performing in 2008 with Carla Bley

Sheppard was born in Warminster, Wiltshire, England, in 1957. At the age of 19 he emerged as a musician in the Salisbury-based contemporary quartet Sphere in the late 1970s, gigging only three weeks after picking up the saxophone. He honed his skills in the wine bars and jazz clubs of the UK and Europe in the early 1980s. He also played with world music groups and with more established improvisers such as Keith Tippett. While still with Sphere, Sheppard moved to Paris, working with French bands Lumière and Urban Sax. In the mid-1980s Sheppard returned to the UK, playing often on Ki Longfellow-Stanshall's and Vivian Stanshall's Bristol, England-based Old Profanity Showboat, and released his self-titled debut solo album, featuring Randy Brecker and Steve Swallow, who also produced the album. The record was well received and led to Sheppard being awarded the Best Newcomer prize at the 1987 British Jazz Awards, followed by the Best Instrumentalist Award in 1988. '87 also saw Sheppard join George Russell's Living Time Orchestra and tour with Gil Evans. His second solo album, Introductions in the Dark, was released in 1989. Unusually for a jazz record, the album entered the UK pop charts. Off the back of this, Sheppard was awarded Best Album and Best Instrumentalist in 1989's British Jazz Awards, became the subject of television documentaries for both the BBC and HTV, and toured the world, taking the first Western jazz group to play in Outer Mongolia.

Sheppard formed his first big band, the Soft on the Inside Band, in 1990 for an album of the same name. The band featured many notable players, including drummer Han Bennick, trumpeter Claude Deppa and trombonist Gary Valente. This band turned into In Co-Motion, which included keyboardist Steve Lodder and bassist Sylvan Richardson, who released an eponymous album in 1991. After this Sheppard signed a deal with Blue Note Records, who issued Rhythm Method in 1993. The In Co-Motion band was expanded for this release and dubbed Big Co-Motion. Big Co-Motion recorded a live album at London jazz club Ronnie Scott's, Delivery Suite, which was released by Blue Note in 1994.

The TV movie The Music Practice, based on Andy Sheppard's music, took part in the contest The Golden Prague, presented by Czech Television, in 1997 in Czech Republic.

== Discography ==
=== As leader ===
- Andy Sheppard (Antilles, 1987)
- Introductions in the Dark (Antilles, 1989)
- Soft on the Inside (Antilles, 1990)
- 66 Shades of Lipstick with Keith Tippett (EG, 1990)
- In Co-Motion (Antilles, 1991)
- Rhythm Method (Blue Note, 1993)
- Inclassificable with Nana Vasconcelos & Steve Lodder (Label Bleu, 1994)
- Delivery Suite (Blue Note, 1994)
- Moving Image with Steve Lodder (Verve, 1996)
- Learning to Wave (Provocateur, 1998)
- Dancing Man & Woman (Provocateur, 2000)
- Nocturnal Tourist (Provocateur, 2001)
- Music for a New Crossing with Kathryn Tickell (Provocateur, 2001)
- P.S. with John Parricelli (Provocateur, 2003)
- Movements in Colour (ECM, 2009)
- Trio Libero (ECM, 2012)
- Surrounded by Sea (ECM, 2015)
- Romaria (ECM, 2018)

With Carla Bley & Steve Swallow

- Songs with Legs (WATT/ECM, 1995)
- The Lost Chords (WATT/ECM, 2004)
- Trios (ECM, 2013)
- Andando el Tiempo (ECM, 2016)
- Life Goes On (ECM, 2020)

=== As sideman ===
With Carla Bley

- Fleur Carnivore (WATT/ECM, 1989)
- The Very Big Carla Bley Band (WATT/ECM, 1991)
- Big Band Theory (Watt, 1993)
- The Carla Bley Big Band Goes to Church (Watt, 1996)
- 4 x 4 (WATT/ECM, 2000)
- Looking for America Looking for America (WATT/ECM, 2003)
- The Lost Chords find Paolo Fresu (WATT/ECM, 2007)
- Appearing Nightly (WATT, 2008)

With Rita Marcotulli

- Koine (Storie Di Note 2002)
- On the Edge of a Perfect Moment (Incipit, 2005)
- Us and Them (Casa Del Jazz 2008)
- Basilicata Coast to Coast (Alice, 2011)

With John Martyn

- The Apprentice (Permanent, 1990)
- Cooltide (Permanent, 1991)
- Couldn't Love You More (Gala, 1992)
- No Little Boy (Gala, 1993)
- Live at Bristol 1991 Official Bootleg (One World, 1998)
- On the Cobbles (Independiente, 2004)

With George Russell

- New York (Electric Bird, 1988)
- The London Concert (Label Bleu, 1989)
- The 80th Birthday Concert (Concept, 2005)

With Sphere

- Sphere (1981)
- Present Tense (1985)

With Judie Tzuke

- Ritmo (Chrysalis, 1983)
- Turning Stones (Polydor, 1989)
- Left Hand Talking (Cherry Red, 2008)

=== As sideman ===
- Ketil Bjornstad, La Notte (ECM, 2013)
- The Blue Aeroplanes, Rough Music (Beggars Banquet, 1994)
- The Blue Aeroplanes, Cavaliers (Swarffinger, 2000)
- Marie Bergman & Maj-Britt Kramer, Who Calls the Tune (Stunt, 2002)
- Curtis Clark, Live at the Bimhuis (Nimbus West)
- Barbara Dennerlein, Hot Stuff (Enja, 1991)
- Espen Eriksen Trio, Perfectly Unhappy (Rune Grammofon, 2018)
- Peter Erskine, Remy Chaudagne, Andy Sheppard, 3 Couleurs (Carbon 7, 1995)
- Gil Evans & Laurent Cugny, Rhythm a Ning (EmArcy, 1988)
- Gil Evans & Laurent Cugny, Golden Hair (EmArcy, 1989)
- Svein Folkvord, Across (Vossa Jazz 2004)
- Freur, Doot-Doot (CBS, 1983)
- Freur, Get Us Out of Here (CBS, 1986)
- John Harle, Terror and Magnificence (Argo, 1996)
- John Harle, The Ship (BBC, 2002)
- Andy Hamilton, Silvershine (World Circuit, 1991)
- Billy Jenkins, Motorway at Night (De Core Music 1988)
- Tore Johansen, Earth Stills (Inner Ear, 2015)
- Trevor Jones, CrissCross (Intrada 1992)
- John Law, Out of the Darkness (Slam, 2006)
- Tony Levin, Live in Viersen (Rare Music, 2011)
- Baaba Maal, Firin' in Fouta (Mango, 1994)
- Joanna MacGregor, Joanna MacGregor and the Britten Sinfonia Present Moondog Sidewalk Dances (Sound Circus, 2006)
- Joanna MacGregor, Deep River (Sound Circus, 2010)
- Lee Morgan, Cage of Eyes (Lakeland, 1985)
- Nato, Triple Objet Creatif De Consommation Auditive (Cabana Music, 1982)
- Thierry Pastor, Le Coup de Folie (Flarenasch, 1982)
- Runrig, Mara (Chrysalis, 1995)
- Surinder Sandhu, Saurang Orchestra (Resonator 2003)
- Sylvain Sylvain, Paper, Pencil & Glue (Munster 2000)
- Steve Tilston, Such & Such (Market Square 2003)
- Up, Bustle & Out, City Breakers (Routes Music 2004)
- Urban Sax, Live in Pori 1984 (Ektro/Urban Noisy 2016)
