= Fleur Carnivore =

Live album by Carla Bley
- Released: 1989
- Recorded: November 14–16, 1988
- Genre: Jazz
- Length: 55:45
- Label: Watt/ECM
- Producer: Carla Bley

Carla Bley chronology
Duets (1988)	Fleur Carnivore (1989)	The Very Big Carla Bley Band (1990)

Fleur Carnivore is a live album by American composer, bandleader and keyboardist Carla Bley recorded at the Jazzhus Montmartre in 1988 and released on the Watt/ECM label in 1989.

== Reception ==
The album is recognised as one of Bley's finest. The Allmusic review by Stephen Cook awarded the album 4½ stars and stated, "On Fleur Carnivore, pianist Carla Bley deftly integrates her beautiful melodies into five complex, yet effortless sounding pieces... Fleur Carnivore is one of Bley's best titles and good place to start for newcomers". The Penguin Guide to Jazz awarded it 3½ stars stating, "This is something like a masterpiece".

Professional ratings
Review scores
Source	Rating
Allmusic	4.5/5 stars
Penguin Guide to Jazz	3.5/4 stars
Tom Hull	B+

== Track listing ==
All compositions by Carla Bley.

1. "Fleur Carnivore" - 11:12
2. "Song of the Eternal Waiting of Canute" - 9:48
3. "Ups and Downs" - 7:05
4. "The Girl Who Cried Champagne Parts 1-3" - 17:15
5. "Healing Power" - 10:27
- Recorded at the Montmartre, Copenhagen, Denmark on November 14–16, 1988.

== Personnel ==
- Carla Bley - piano
- Lew Soloff, Jens Winther - trumpet
- Frank Lacy - french horn, flugelhorn
- Gary Valente - trombone
- Bob Stewart - tuba
- Daniel Beaussier - oboe, flute
- Wolfgang Puschnig - alto saxophone, flute
- Andy Sheppard - tenor saxophone, clarinet
- Christof Lauer tenor saxophone, soprano saxophone
- Roberto Ottini - baritone saxophone, soprano saxophone
- Karen Mantler - harmonica, organ, vibes, chimes
- Steve Swallow - bass guitar
- Buddy Williams - drums
- Don Alias - percussion
