= Songs with Legs =

Live album by Carla Bley
- Released: 1994
- Recorded: May 1994
- Genre: Jazz
- Length: 54:14
- Label: Watt/ECM
- Producer: Carla Bley & Steve Swallow

Carla Bley chronology
Big Band Theory (1993)	Songs with Legs (1994)	The Carla Bley Big Band Goes to Church (1996)

Steve Swallow chronology
Real Book (1993)	Songs with Legs (1994)	Parlance (1995)

Songs with Legs is a live album by the American composer, bandleader and keyboardist Carla Bley with the saxophonist Andy Sheppard and the bass guitarist Steve Swallow recorded in Europe and released on the Watt/ECM label in 1994.

== Reception ==
The AllMusic review by Alex Henderson awarded the album 2½ stars and said, "For those who've said they wish Bley would solo more often, Songs with Legs is an album to hear." A biographer also highlighted her increased focus on piano and improvisation at this period in Bley's career, and highlighted the "soulful, spiritual-like piece 'The Lord Is Listenin' to Ya, Hallelujah!'". The Penguin Guide to Jazz awarded it 3 stars, saying, "She doesn't put a foot wrong throughout."

Professional ratings
Review scores
Source	Rating
AllMusic	2.5/5 stars
Penguin Guide to Jazz	3/4 stars
Tom Hull	B+

== Track listing ==
All compositions by Carla Bley except where noted.

1. "Real Life Hits" - 8:08
2. "The Lord Is Listenin' to Ya, Hallelujah!" - 7:48
3. "Chicken" - 8:21
4. "Misterioso" (Thelonious Monk) - 10:20
5. "Wrong Key Donkey" - 12:02
6. "Crazy with You" - 7:37

- Recorded live on tour in France, Italy, Austria, Germany, Turkey and England in May 1994.

== Personnel ==
- Carla Bley - piano
- Andy Sheppard - tenor saxophone, soprano saxophone
- Steve Swallow - bass guitar
