= The Lost Chords =

2004 live album by Carla Bley

Live album by Carla Bley
- Released: 2004
- Recorded: October 2003
- Genre: Jazz
- Label: Watt/ECM
- Producer: Steve Swallow

Carla Bley chronology
Looking for America (2002)	The Lost Chords (2004)	Appearing Nightly (2006)

The Lost Chords is a live album by American composer, bandleader and keyboardist Carla Bley with Andy Sheppard, Steve Swallow, and Billy Drummond recorded in Europe in 2003 and released on the Watt/ECM label in 2004.

== Reception ==
The album received critical approval. The Allmusic review by Thom Jurek awarded The Lost Chords 3½ stars and stated "The depth of communication here is marvelous, and given the level of comfort these musicians have with one another, that feeling of ease is communicated to the listener as well". The JazzTimes review by Geoffrey Himes said "if great jazz playing involves fresh harmonic thinking and ensemble give-and-take, this is some of the best jazz playing around.". The Penguin Guide to Jazz awarded it 4 stars calling it "A marvellous record... Recommended to fans and newcomers alike".

Professional ratings
Review scores
Source	Rating
Allmusic	3.5/5 stars
Penguin Guide to Jazz	4/4 stars

== Track listing ==
All compositions by Carla Bley.

1. "3 Blind Mice: 3 Blind Mice" - 5:33
2. "3 Blind Mice: Wink Leak/Traps/Leonard Feather" - 5:30
3. "3 Blind Mice: The Maze/Blind Mice Redux" - 4:14
4. "Hip Hop" - 7:44
5. "Tropical Depression" - 7:39
6. "Red" - 6:03
7. "Lost Chords: I" - 9:07
8. "Lost Chords: II" - 4:23
9. "Lost Chords: III" - 3:41
- Recorded live in Europe in October 2003.

== Personnel ==
- Carla Bley - piano
- Andy Sheppard - tenor saxophone
- Steve Swallow - bass guitar
- Billy Drummond - drums
