= Afternoon of a Georgia Faun =

- Original LP cover

Studio album by Marion Brown
- Released: 1970
- Recorded: August 10, 1970
- Studios: Sound Ideas Studio, NYC
- Genres: Avant-garde jazz; free jazz
- Length: 35:04
- Labels: ECM; ECM 1004 ST
- Producer: Manfred Eicher

Marion Brown chronology
In Sommerhausen (1969)	Afternoon of a Georgia Faun (1970)	Duets (1973)

Afternoon of a Georgia Faun is an album by American jazz saxophonist Marion Brown, recorded on August 10, 1970 and released on ECM later that year.

Along with Brown's Geechee Recollections and Sweet Earth Flying, Afternoon of a Georgia Faun is dedicated to the state of Georgia.

== Background ==
In an interview regarding the recording, Brown stated that the album was inspired by his youth, evoking "things that I saw and heard each day going from my house to school, church, visiting, roaming with my dog and a BB gun looking for birds to shoot... It was also... the things my ears enjoyed: birds singing outside my window, dogs barking, a rooster crowing in the morning, crickets in the summer, the sound of people having a good time in one of the houses where those good times are had, standing outside the sanctified church at night enjoying music, and the sound of happy feet stamping furiously, in tune with the preacher and themselves."

Concerning the recording session, pianist Chick Corea stated: "There was so much respect for one another in the studio that... as soon as the first sounds began and we knew we were recording, everyone was in it and totally listening to one another—listening to the sounds that the others were making and always putting something in that complimented the other sound or contrasted the other sound one way or the other."

Percussionist Andrew Cyrille reflected: "I don’t remember Marion saying, 'Stop. No. Do this, do that.' He just accepted what was going on... He just asked us to go ahead and play, and that's what we did... Everybody was kind of focused on him spiritually."

Author Bob Gluck suggested that Afternoon of a Georgia Faun was an influence on the group Circle, which featured both Corea and Braxton, as the album's recording took place shortly before Circle's first recording sessions later in August 1970.

== Reception ==
Professional ratings
Review scores
Source	Rating
AllMusic	4/5 stars
The Penguin Guide to Jazz Recordings	3/4 stars
Tom Hull – on the Web	B

In a review for AllMusic, Brian Olewnick praised the title track as "a wonderful, percussive evocation of pastoral Georgia, something along the lines of what the Art Ensemble of Chicago were doing around the same time, but without the satire and with a greater sense of serenity. As the flutes, reeds, voice, and piano enter, there is no idea of 'soloing'; instead, each contributes to the ongoing, evolving texture of the piece, creating a fabric that's as cohesive as it is unplanned." He considers "Djinji's Corner" "a bit more fleshed out, a little more 'traditional' in one way, though still quite unusual for the time... It gradually builds to something of a frenzy, but in an unforced manner that shows it to be merely another approach to the territory explored earlier." He concludes that the album constitutes "a key work in Marion Brown's oeuvre and a recording that belongs in any collection of contemporary jazz."

Writing for All About Jazz, Nic Jones commented: "Brown's music had become something which quietly demanded that its players also be virtuoso listeners. The presence of the likes of saxophonist Anthony Braxton and drummer Andrew Cyrille ensures that this isn't a problem, while Chick Corea commits to posterity some of the most extraordinary work he's ever put on record. Despite this—or, indeed, perhaps because of it—the degree to which Brown was now preoccupied with his 'Own Thing' as opposed to the 'New Thing' could not be more pronounced."

Writing for Between Sound and Space, Tyran Grillo called the album "a masterpiece of free jazz and well worth the chance for the adventurous listener."

In an article for the magazine The Bitter Southerner, Jon Ross wrote: "The title track on Georgia Faun is not about the notes played or the facility of each performer; Brown didn't even pick up his saxophone during the 17-minute tune, but the ideas, the organization, and the feeling are his own... Georgia Faun is a sound of recollection mixed with ancestral lineage. It's not nostalgia or a longing for 1930s Atlanta, but a re-creation of the feeling of the South."

== Track listing ==
All tracks are written by Marion Brown.

Side I
No.	Title	Length
1.	"Afternoon of a Georgia Faun"	17:01

Side II
No.	Title	Length
1.	"Djinji's Corner"	18:03
Total length:		35:04

== Personnel ==
- Marion Brown – alto saxophone, zomari, percussion
- Anthony Braxton – soprano and alto saxophones, clarinet, contrabass clarinet, musette, flute, percussion
- Bennie Maupin – tenor saxophone, alto flute, bass clarinet, acorn, bells, wood flute, percussion
- Jeanne Lee – vocals, percussion
- Gayle Palmore – vocals, piano, percussion
- Chick Corea – piano, bells, gong, percussion
- Jack Gregg – double bass, percussion
- Andrew Cyrille – percussion
- Larry Curtis – percussion (2)
- William Green – percussion (2)
- Billy Malone – African drums (2)

=== Technical personnel ===
- Manfred Eicher – producer
- George Klabin – engineer
- Dieter Henkel – artwork
