= Ikonen =

Ikonen is a Finnish surname. Notable people with the surname include:

- Anna-Kaisa Ikonen (born 1977), Finnish politician
- Ansa Ikonen (1913–1989), Finnish film and theater actress
- Glenn Ikonen (born 1955), Swedish Paralympic wheelchair curler
- Henri Ikonen (born 1994), Finnish professional ice hockey forward
- Jasse Ikonen (born 1990), Finnish professional ice hockey player
- Johanna Ikonen (born 1969), Finnish female ice hockey player
- Joni Ikonen (born 1999), Finnish ice hockey forward
- Juha Ikonen (born 1970), Finnish professional ice hockey player
- Juuso Ikonen (born 1995), Finnish professional ice hockey player
- Kari Ikonen (born 1973), Finnish pianist, Moog player, composer and Master of Music
- Lasse Ikonen (born 2003), Finnish footballer
- Leander Ikonen (1860–1918), Finnish architect and politician
- OG Ikonen, Finnish rapper
- Oskari Ikonen (1883–1938), Finnish politician
- Ossi Ikonen (born 1990), Finnish professional ice hockey defenceman
- Pasi Ikonen (1980–2024), Finnish orienteering competitor
- Pekka Ikonen (1877–1956), Finnish farmer, bank director and politician
- Pentti Ikonen (1934–2007), Finnish swimmer
- Pirkko Ikonen (1927–2026), Finnish politician
- Sara Ikonen (born 2004), Finnish professional footballer
- Toivo Ikonen (1891–1976), Finnish farmer, bank director and politician
- Väinö Ikonen (1895–1954), Finnish wrestler
