= Throb (Gary Burton album) =

Studio album by Gary Burton
- Released: 1969
- Recorded: June 2–5, 1969
- Studio: Atlantic, New York
- Genre: Jazz
- Length: 34:13
- Label: Atlantic
- Producer: Joel Dorn

Gary Burton chronology
Country Roads & Other Places (1969)	Throb (1969)	Good Vibes (1970)

Throb is an album by vibraphonist Gary Burton. recorded in 1969 and released on the Atlantic label. Burton is featured with guitarist Jerry Hahn, violinist Richard Greene, bassist Steve Swallow and drummer Bill Goodwin.

== Release and reception ==
Professional ratings
Review scores
Source	Rating
AllMusic	3/5 stars
Rolling Stone	(positive)
The Rolling Stone Jazz Record Guide	2/5 stars

Originally released on vinyl in 1969, the album was paired with Gary Burton's collaboration album with Keith Jarrett on a Rhino CD reissue in 1994 before being re-issued in Japan on CD in 2012 and 2017. The AllMusic review by Ron Wynn stated: "Burton continued the jazz-cum-rock and country experimentation that marked other LPs like Tennessee Firebird and Duster". The Penguin Guide to Jazz Recordings describes the album as “magnificent”, and “one of the most evocative records produced at the time.”

== Track listing ==
1. "Henniger Flats" (David Pritchard) - 4:25
2. "Turn of the Century" (Michael Gibbs) - 5:07
3. "Chickens" (Steve Swallow) - 2:29
4. "Arise, Her Eyes" (Swallow) - 3:51
5. "Prime Time" (Jerry Hahn) - 4:07
6. "Throb" (Gibbs) - 4:33
7. "Doin the Pig" (Swallow) - 3:47
8. "Triple Portrait" (Gibbs) - 4:28
9. "Some Echoes" (Gibbs) - 6:59

- Recorded at Atlantic Recording Studios in New York.

== Personnel ==
- Gary Burton – vibraphone, piano
- Richard Greene – violin
- Jerry Hahn – guitar
- Steve Swallow – bass
- Bill Goodwin – drums
