= Jack Gregg =

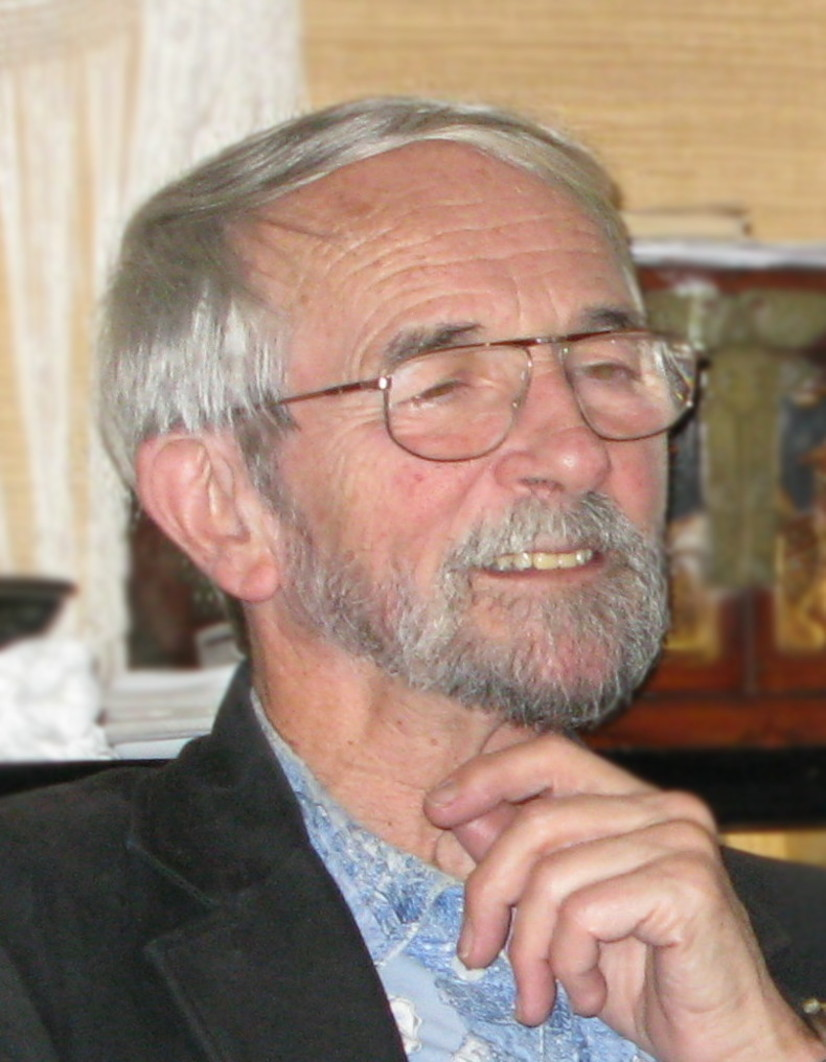
- Jack Gregg in 2010

Background information
- Born: 1938 (age 87–88)
- Origin: Memphis, Tennessee
- Genres: Jazz
- Instrument: Double bass
- Formerly of: Compost

Jack Gregg is an American jazz bass player. He grew up in Memphis, Tennessee, where he started playing the bass at the age of 15. In 1961 he joined the Claude Thornhill Orchestra and toured with the band for two years. In 1964, he moved to New York City, where he studied with Frederick Zimmermann and played in Roy Eldridge's band. He played in a trio led by harpist Daphne Hellman. In addition to jazz, their repertoire ranged from "the baroque of Bach, Scarlatti, Corelli and Couperin through the lush music of Tchaikovsky, Strauss and Debussy, to arrangements of contemporary composers such as the Beatles and Bobbie Gentry.

In 1971, Gregg, Jack DeJohnette, Bob Moses, Harold Vick and Juma Santos formed Compost, a jazz fusion band. Compost made two albums for Columbia Records, Take Off Your Body in 1971 and Life is Round in 1973. In an interview in 2000, Steve Swallow recalled that he had given his acoustic bass to Gregg in 1971, after having switched to electric bass.

In 1976, Gregg left the United States and subsequently lived in Europe, eventually settling in Paris. He toured with Gunter Hampel, Marion Brown, Joe Henderson, Laszlo Gardony and Joe Lee Wilson, among others, and has appeared on many recordings. He played on Abbey Lincoln's recording Golden Lady, which was recorded in Paris in 1980 while Gregg was touring as part of Marion Brown's rhythm section.

In 2005, he visited Lebanon to play at the B 018 nightclub in Beirut. While there, he met Walid Gholmieh and Ziad Rahbani and in the same year he moved to Beirut, where he set up the double bass program at the Lebanese National Higher Conservatory of Music and played in the Lebanese National Symphony Orchestra. Gregg, pianist Arthur Satyan and drummer Steve Phillips formed a trio called Three Wheel Drive that played "authentic jazz" in Lebanon from 1996 until 2004. In 2005, Gregg returned to Paris.
