= Stan Strickland =

American jazz singer, saxophonist, and flutist

Stan Strickland is an American singer, saxophonist, and flutist.

Strickland was a protege of Ran Blake. He recorded in the 1970s, on releases led by Baird Hersey and Paul Gresham. He later appeared on albums led by Laszlo Gardony and Bob Moses. Strickland is an associate professor at Berklee College of Music.
