= Something's Coming =

Something's Coming may refer to:

- "Something's Coming" (Desperate Housewives), an episode of the TV series Desperate Housewives
- "Something's Coming" (song), a song from the musical West Side Story
- Something's Coming! (album) a 1963 album by Gary Burton
- Something's Coming: The BBC Recordings 1969–1970, an album by Yes
- Something's Coming, a 2010 album by Ty Tabor
- "Something's Coming" (American Horror Story), an episode of the eleventh season of American Horror Story
- "Some Thing's Coming", a song by I Monster from the album Neveroddoreven
