= Tiger Okoshi =

American jazz fusion trumpeter (born 1950)

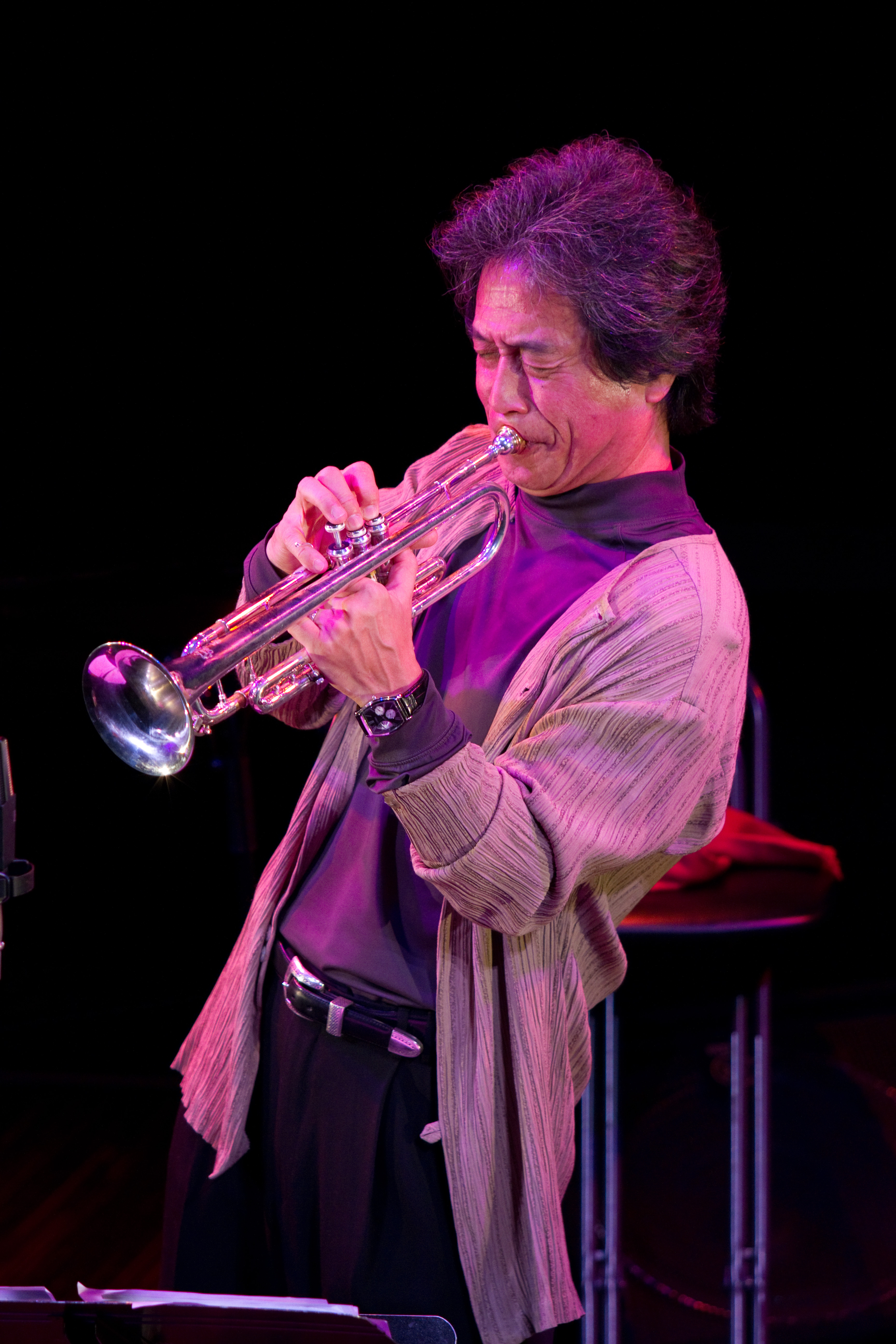

Background information
- Born: Toru Okoshi; March 21, 1950 (age 76); Ashiya, Hyōgo, Japan
- Genres: Jazz, jazz fusion
- Occupation: Musician
- Instrument: Trumpet
- Years active: 1972–present

Toru "Tiger" Okoshi (born March 21, 1950) is an American jazz fusion trumpeter born in Ashiya, Japan.

After studying at Kwansei Gakuin University, Okoshi moved to the U.S. in 1972. In 1975 he completed studies at the Berklee College of Music. Okoshi collaborated in the 1970s with Gary Burton, and played with the Mike Gibbs Orchestra at Carnegie Hall in 1974. Following this he toured with Buddy Rich. In the early 1990s, he played in George Russell's Living Time Orchestra and recorded with Bob Moses. In the early 2000s he recorded several songs on the album Orpheus Again by Bruce Arnold.

== Discography ==
=== As leader ===
- Tiger's Baku (JVC, 1981) with Vinnie Colaiuta, Gerry Etkins, Steve Forman, Robert Gonzales, Quinous Johnson, Tim Landers, Mike Stern
- Mudd Cake (JVC, 1982)
- Face to Face (JVC, 1989) with Gerry Etkins, Rikiya Higashihara, Takayuki Hijikata, Koh Shimizu
- That Was Then, This Is Now (JVC, 1990) with Gerry Etkins, Rikiya Higashihara, Takayuki Hijikata, Koh Shimizu
- Echoes of a Note (JVC, 1993) with Jay Anderson, Peter Erskine, Béla Fleck, Gil Goldstein, Mike Stern
- Two Sides to Every Story (JVC, 1994) with Jack DeJohnette, Vic Firth, Gil Goldstein, Dave Holland, Mike Stern
- Color of Soil (JVC, 1998) with Jay Anderson, Kenny Barron, Mino Cinelu, Hank Roberts
- Plays Standard (Geneon, 2008)

=== As sideman ===
With Bruce Arnold

- Orpheus Again (2010)
- With Dave Grusin NY-LA Dream Band (1983)

With Gary Burton

- Times Square (ECM, 1978)

With Lorraine Desmarais

- Live au Club Soda (2007)
