= David Pritchard =

David Pritchard may refer to:

- David Pritchard (chess player) (1919–2005), British chess writer
- David Pritchard (cricketer) (1893–1983), Australian cricketer
- David Pritchard (footballer) (born 1972), English former footballer
- David Pritchard (musician) (born 1949), American guitarist
- David E. Pritchard (born 1941), physics professor at the Massachusetts Institute of Technology
