= Who Is Gary Burton? =

Studio album by Gary Burton
- Released: 1963
- Recorded: September 14–15, 1962
- Studio: RCA Victor, New York City
- Genre: Jazz
- Label: RCA
- Producer: Marty Gold

Gary Burton chronology
New Vibe Man in Town (1961)	Who Is Gary Burton? (1963)	Something's Coming! (1964)

Who Is Gary Burton? is an album by vibraphonist Gary Burton, recorded in 1962 and released on the RCA label. Some of the musicians who appear are alto saxophonist Phil Woods, trombonist Bob Brookmeyer, trumpeter Clark Terry, pianist Tommy Flanagan, bassist John Neves and drummer Joe Morello.

== Reception ==
Professional ratings
Review scores
Source	Rating
AllMusic	4/5 stars
DownBeat	3.5/5 stars
The Penguin Guide to Jazz Recordings	3/4 stars

The AllMusic review by Ken Dryden stated: "The talented young vibraphonist had already proven himself as a sideman and was breaking new ground as a master technician on his instrument, utilizing four mallets simultaneously with seemingly little effort".

== Track listing ==
1. "Storm" (Chris Swansen) - 4:12
2. "I've Just Seen Her" (Lee Adams, Charles Strouse) - 4:15
3. "Fly Time Fly (Sigh)" (Michael Gibbs) - 4:31
4. "Conception" (George Shearing) - 4:01
5. "Get Away Blues" (Swansen) - 5:40
6. "My Funny Valentine" (Lorenz Hart, Richard Rodgers) - 5:22
7. "One Note" (Jaki Byard) - 5:20

- Recorded at RCA Victor's Studio A in New York City on September 14, (tracks 1 & 7) and 15 (tracks 2–6), 1962.

== Personnel ==
- Gary Burton – vibraphone
- Clark Terry – trumpet
- Bob Brookmeyer – valve trombone (tracks 1 & 7)
- Phil Woods – alto saxophone, clarinet
- Tommy Flanagan – piano
- John Neves – bass
- Joe Morello (tracks 1 & 7), Chris Swansen (tracks 2–6) – drums
