= Bruno Råberg =

Bruno Raberg
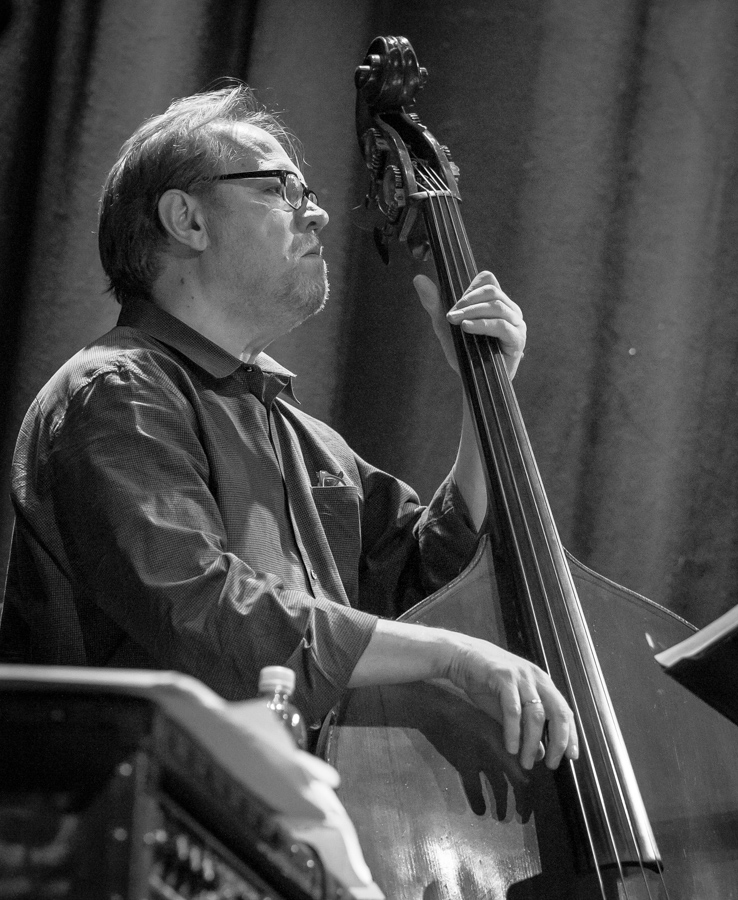
- Råberg performs in 2016.

Background information
- Born: July 13, 1954 (age 71); Sweden
- Genres: Jazz
- Occupation: Musician
- Instrument: Bass
- Years active: 1980s–present
- Website: brunoraberg.com

Bruno Råberg (born July 13, 1954) is a Swedish jazz bassist, composer, and music professor.

== Career ==
Råberg has performed/recorded with Kris Davis, Bruce Barth, Eje Thelin, Jim Black, Chris Cheek, Adam Cruz, George Garzone, Mick Goodrick, Donny McCaslin, Ben Monder, Terri-Lyne Carrington, Bob Moses, Kenny Werner, Matt Wilson, and Mike Mainieri. He is a senior Professor at Berklee College of Music in Boston

== Discography as a leader ==
- Pentimento feat. Donny McCaslin, Anders Boström (Boston Skyline, 1992)
- Orbis feat. Bob Moses, Ole Mathisen (Orbis Music, 1998)
- Presence feat. Ole Mathisen, Marcello Pellitteri (Orbis, 1999)
- Ascensio feat Allan Chase, Phil Grenadier (Orbis, 2003)
- Chrysalis feat. Donny McCaslin, Mick Goodrick (Orbis, 2004)
- Lifelines feat. Ben Monder, Chris Cheek(Orbis, 2008)
- Plunge (Orbis, 2012)
- Hot Box feat Phil Grenadier (Orbis, 2015)
- For the Unknown feat Allan Chase (Orbis, 2016)
- Triloka: Music for Strings feat Layth Sidiq, Naseem Alatrash (Orbis, 2016)
- Tailwind feat. Bruce Barth, Adam Cruz (Red Piano, 2018)
- Fantasy for Woodwind Quintet (Orbis, 2019)
- The Prospector feat Allan Chase, Austin McMahon (Orbis, 2020)
- Evolver Bruno Raberg Tentet (Orbis, 2024)
