= The Time Machine (Gary Burton album) =

Studio album by Gary Burton
- Released: 1966
- Recorded: April 5–6, 1966
- Genre: Jazz
- Length: 37:13
- Label: RCA
- Producer: Brad McCuen

Gary Burton chronology
The Groovy Sound of Music (1965)	The Time Machine (1966)	Tennessee Firebird (1967)

The Time Machine is an album by American vibraphonist Gary Burton recorded in 1966 and released on the RCA label. Burton also plays marimba and piano in a trio with bassist Steve Swallow and drummer Larry Bunker.

== Reception ==
The Allmusic review by Scott Yanow stated: "This Gary Burton LP was a bit unusual in that he overdubbed piano and marimbas in addition to his distinctive vibes... Interesting music overall".

Professional ratings
Review scores
Source	Rating
Allmusic	4/5 stars

== Track listing ==
All compositions by Gary Burton except as indicated

1. "The Sunset Bell" - 5:04
2. "Six-Nix, Quix, Flix" - 6:08
3. "Interim I" - 1:36
4. "Chega De Saudade (No More Blues)" (Antônio Carlos Jobim, Vinícius de Moraes) - 4:43
5. "Childhood" (Michael Gibbs) - 1:02
6. "Deluge" (Gibbs) - 4:47
7. "Norwegian Wood (This Bird Has Flown)" (John Lennon, Paul McCartney) - 3:26
8. "Interim II" - 0:54
9. "Falling Grace" (Steve Swallow) - 4:00
10. "My Funny Valentine" (Richard Rodgers, Lorenz Hart) - 5:33

- Recorded at RCA Victor's Studio B in New York City on April 5 & 6, 1966.

== Personnel ==
- Gary Burton — vibraphone, piano, marimba
- Steve Swallow — bass
- Larry Bunker — drums
