= In Pas(s)ing =

1979 album by Mick Goodrick

Studio album by Mick Goodrick
- Released: 1979
- Recorded: November 1978
- Studio: Talent Studio; Oslo, Norway
- Genre: Jazz
- Length: 42:38
- Label: ECM 1139
- Producer: Manfred Eicher

Mick Goodrick chronology
| In Pas(s)ing (1979) | Biorhythms (1980) |

In Pas(s)ing is the debut album by guitarist Mick Goodrick, recorded in November 1978 and released on ECM the following year. The quartet features reed player John Surman and rhythm section Eddie Gómez and Jack DeJohnette.

== Critical reception ==
Professional ratings
Review scores
| Source | Rating |
|---|---|
| AllMusic | 4.5/5 stars |

The Financial Post concluded that "it's the brawny masculine force of saxophonist John Surman which raises the tunes above pretty."

The AllMusic review by Ron Wynn deemed the album "a strong set that had fusion, straight-ahead, and even almost free pieces."

== Track listing ==
All tracks are written by Mick Goodrick except where noted

| No. | Title | Writer(s) | Length |
|---|---|---|---|
| 1. | "Feebles, Fables and Ferns" | | 8:02 |
| 2. | "In the Tavern of Ruin" | | 11:31 |
| 3. | "Summer Band Camp" | | 6:12 |
| 4. | "Pedal Pusher" | | 8:13 |
| 5. | "In Passing" | Goodrick; DeJohnette; Gomez; Surman | 8:50 |

== Personnel ==
- Mick Goodrick – guitar
- John Surman – soprano and baritone saxophones, bass clarinet
- Eddie Gómez – bass
- Jack DeJohnette – drums
