= Times Square (Gary Burton album) =

Studio album by Gary Burton
- Released: November 1978
- Recorded: January 1978
- Studio: Generation Sound, New York City
- Genre: Jazz
- Length: 38:13
- Label: ECM 1111
- Producer: Manfred Eicher

Gary Burton chronology
Passengers (1977)	Times Square (1978)	Duet (1979)

Professional ratings
Review scores
Source	Rating
AllMusic	4/5 stars
The Rolling Stone Jazz Record Guide	4/5 stars

Times Square is an album by vibraphonist Gary Burton recorded in January 1978 and released on ECM November later that year. The quartet features rhythm section Steve Swallow and Roy Haynes, and trumpeter Tiger Okoshi.

== Reception ==
AllMusic awarded the album four stars, noting that Tiger Okoshi's untypically prominent role on the trumpet results in a "fine outing".

== Track listing ==
1. "Semblance" (Keith Jarrett) – 4:01
2. "Coral" (Jarrett) – 5:48
3. "Peau Douce" (Steve Swallow) – 4:55
4. "Careful" (Jim Hall) – 4:42
5. "Midnight" (Swallow) – 4:21
6. "Radio" (Swallow) – 4:42
7. "True or False" (Swallow, Roy Haynes) – 2:21
8. "Como en Vietnam" (Swallow) – 6:43

The track listing on the original release incorrectly swaps tracks "Peau Douce" and "Careful".

== Personnel ==
- Gary Burton – vibraphone
- Steve Swallow – bass guitar
- Roy Haynes – drums
- Tiger Okoshi – trumpet
