= The Groovy Sound of Music =

Studio album by Gary Burton
- Released: 1965
- Recorded: December 21–22, 1964
- Studios: RCA Victor, Studio A, New York City
- Genre: Jazz
- Length: 35:59
- Label: RCA
- Producer: Joe René

Gary Burton chronology
Something's Coming! (1964)	The Groovy Sound of Music (1965)	The Time Machine (1966)

The Groovy Sound of Music is an album by vibraphonist Gary Burton, recorded in 1964 and released on the RCA label which features jazz interpretations of tunes from the Broadway musical The Sound of Music written by Richard Rodgers and Oscar Hammerstein II.

== Conception, Recording and Packaging ==
The album was recorded at the request of RCA Records who, as part of their negotiations with composer Richard Rodgers for the Sound of Music movie soundtrack (also released in 1965), had promised to get artists on their roster to record songs from the musical. It was recorded in two sessions, one featuring Burton as part of a jazz sextet (as well as playing "Edelweiss" solo), and the other with a small orchestra arranged and conducted by Gary McFarland.

Burton would later profess disappointments with the album, particularly with McFarland's uncharacteristically "conventional and uninspiring" arrangements. He was also embarrassed by the title and cover art that RCA chose for the project; after complaining to the company executive Steve Sholes and threatening to leave the label, he was promised that he would henceforth be allowed more input in such matters.

== Reception ==
The AllMusic review by Ken Dryden stated: "Aside from 'My Favorite Things', jazz musicians haven't been particularly drawn to songs from The Sound of Music, so the Groovy Sound of Music songbook by Gary Burton is quite a treat".

Professional ratings
Review scores
Source	Rating
AllMusic	4/5 stars

== Track listing ==
All compositions by Richard Rodgers and Oscar Hammerstein II

1. "Climb Ev'ry Mountain" - 4:50
2. "Maria" - 3:34
3. "An Ordinary Couple" - 4:50
4. "My Favorite Things" - 5:55
5. "Sixteen Going on Seventeen" - 4:30
6. "Do-Re-Mi" - 3:50
7. "Edelweiss" - 3:03
8. "The Sound of Music" - 5:27

- Recorded at RCA Victor's Studio A in New York City on December 21 & 22, 1964.

== Personnel ==
Musicians

- Gary Burton – vibraphone, arranger (tracks 2, 4 & 6)
- Phil Woods – alto saxophone, clarinet
- Joe Puma – guitar
- Bob Brookmeyer – valve trombone
- Steve Swallow – bass
- Ed Shaughnessy, Joe Hunt – drums
- Gary McFarland – arranger (tracks 1, 3, 5, 7 & 8)

Production

- Mickey Crofford – engineer
