= Mick Goodrick =

American jazz guitarist (1945–2022)

- Born: June 9, 1945; Sharon, Pennsylvania, U.S.
- Died: November 16, 2022 (aged 77)
- Genre: Jazz
- Occupations: Musician, teacher
- Instrument: Guitar

Mick Goodrick (June 9, 1945 – November 16, 2022) was an American jazz guitarist who spent most of his career as a teacher. In the early 1970s, he worked with Gary Burton and Pat Metheny.

== Biography ==
An Elvis fan, Goodrick began studying guitar in his pre-teens and was performing professionally a few years later. When he was sixteen, he became interested in jazz at a Stan Kenton Band Camp. He attended the Berklee School of Music from 1963 to 1967. He taught at Berklee, then spent a few years touring with Gary Burton. After returning to Boston, he settled into a career largely as an educator.

Goodrick has had many notable students, including Bill Frisell, Julian Lage, John Scofield, Lage Lund, Mike Stern, Avner Strauss, Rick Beato and Rale Micic. His first book, The Advancing Guitarist, is an instruction manual for guitarists of all styles. He has also written a series of books addressing the intricacies of harmonic voice leading.

Goodrick worked with Charlie Haden's Liberation Music Orchestra during the 1980s and early 1990s, with Jack DeJohnette in the late 1980s, and with Steve Swallow in the late 1990s. He performed in a duo with Pat Metheny at the Montreal Jazz Festival in 2005 and with Wolfgang Muthspiel at the Jazz Standard in 2008.

Goodrick died from complications of COVID-19 and Parkinson's disease on November 16, 2022, at the age of 77.

== Discography ==
=== As leader or co-leader ===
- In Pas(s)ing (ECM, 1979) with John Surman, Eddie Gómez, Jack DeJohnette
- Biorhythms (CMP, 1990) with Harvie Swartz, Gary Chaffee
- Rare Birds (RAM, 1993) with Joe Diorio
- Sunscreams (RAM, 1994) with Jerry Bergonzi, Bruce Gertz, Gary Chaffee
- In the Same Breath (CMP, 1996) with Dave Liebman, Wolfgang Muthspiel
- Noisy Old Men (Jam, 2002) with John Abercrombie, Steve Swallow, Gary Chaffee

=== As sideman ===
With Gary Burton

- The New Quartet (ECM, 1973)
- Ring (ECM, 1974)
- Seven Songs for Quartet and Chamber Orchestra (ECM, 1974)
- In the Public Interest (Polydor, 1974)
- Dreams So Real (ECM, 1976)

With Jack DeJohnette

- Sorcery (Prestige, 1974)
- Irresistible Forces (Impulse!, 1987)
- Audio-Visualscapes (Impulse!, 1988)

With Claudio Fasoli

- Bodies (Innowo, 1990)
- Cities (RAM, 1993)
- Ten Tributes (RAM, 1995)
- Trois Trios (Splasc(H), 1999)

With Charlie Haden

- The Ballad of the Fallen (ECM, 1983)
- Dream Keeper (DIW, 1990)
- The Montreal Tapes: Liberation Music Orchestra (Verve, 1999)

With others

- Jerry Bergonzi, On Again (RAM, 1998)
- Con Brio, Con Brio (Plug, 1983)
- Con Brio, The Ray (Not Fat, 1987)
- Hal Crook, Hero Worship (RAM, 1997)
- Pino Daniele, Un Uomo in Blues (CGD, 1990)
- Pino Daniele, Sotto 'O Sole (CGD, 1991)
- Dominique Eade, The Long Way Home (RCA Victor, 1999)
- Aydin Esen, Pictures (Bellaphon, 1989)
- Laszlo Gardony, Breakout (Avenue Jazz, 1994)
- Michael Gibbs, In the Public Interest (Polydor, 1974)
- Woody Herman, Woody (Cadet, 1970)
- Jim Hall, Live at Town Hall (Musicmasters, 1991)
- Charlie Mariano, Somewhere, Out there (New Edition 2013)
- Wolfgang Muthspiel, Live at the Jazz Standard (Material, 2010)
- Mika Pohjola, Myths & Beliefs (GM, 1996)
- Bruno Raberg, Chrysalis (OrbisMusic, 2004)
- Steve Swallow, Deconstructed (Xtra Watt, 1997)
- Steve Swallow, Always Pack Your Uniform on Top (Xtra Watt, 2000)
- Harvie Swartz, In a Different Light (Bluemoon, 1990)
- Harvie Swartz, Arrival (RCA 1992)
- Gary Thomas, By Any Means Necessary (JMT, 1989)
- Dan Wall, On the Inside Looking In (Double-Time, 2000)

== Selected books ==
- Goodrick, Mick (1987). The Advancing Guitarist: Applying Guitar Concepts and Techniques. Hal Leonard Corp. ISBN 0881885894.
- Goodrick, Mick (2003). Factorial Rhythm: For All Instruments. Liquid Harmony Books. ISBN 0971185824.
- Goodrick, Mick (2003). Mr. Goodchord's Almanac of Guitar Voice-Leading for the Year 2001 and Beyond, Vol. 1: Name That Chord. Liquid Harmony Books. ISBN 0971185808.
- Goodrick, Mick (2005). Mr. Goodchord's Almanac of Guitar Voice-Leading for the Year 2001 and Beyond, Vol. 2: Do Not Name That Chord. Liquid Harmony Books. ISBN 0971185816.
- Goodrick, Mick (2007). Mr. Goodchord's Almanac of Guitar Voice-Leading for the Year 2001 and Beyond, Vol. 3: Beyond the Mother Lode. Liquid Harmony Books. ISBN 9780971185845.
- Goodrick, Mick (2008). 36 Solo Pieces for Fingerstyle Guitar + Duo, Trio, & Quartet Arrangements. Liquid Harmony Books. ISBN 9780971185852.
- Goodrick, Mick; Miller, Tim (2012). Creative Chordal Harmony for Guitar: Using Generic Modality Compression. Berklee Press. ISBN 978-0876391280.
