= Seven Songs for Quartet and Chamber Orchestra =

Studio album by Gary Burton
- Released: August 1974
- Recorded: December 1973
- Studio: Hamburg, Germany
- Genre: Jazz
- Length: 37:06
- Label: ECM 1040 ST
- Producer: Manfred Eicher

Gary Burton chronology
The New Quartet (1973)	Seven Songs for Quartet and Chamber Orchestra (1974)	Ring (1974)

Professional ratings
Review scores
Source	Rating
AllMusic	3/5 stars
AllAboutJazz	5/5 stars

Seven Songs for Quartet and Chamber Orchestra is an album by jazz vibraphonist Gary Burton recorded in December 1973 and released on ECM August the following year. The quartet, featuring rhythm section Mick Goodrick, Steve Swallow and Ted Seibs, are backed by Michael Gibbs conducting the NDR Symphony Orchestra, who composed most of the music.

== Track listing ==
All tracks composed by Michael Gibbs except as noted

1. "Nocturne vulgaire/Arise Her Eyes" (Mike Gibbs, Steve Swallow) - 9:27
2. "Throb" - 5:27
3. "By Way of a Preface" - 4:33
4. "Phases" - 7:23
5. "The Rain Before It Falls" - 4:04
6. "Three" - 6:12

== Personnel ==
- Gary Burton – vibraharp
- Mick Goodrick – guitar
- Steve Swallow – bass
- Ted Seibs – drums
- Michael Gibbs – conductor
  - NDR Symphony Orchestra
