= New Train =

Studio album by Paul Pena
- Released: September 26, 2000
- Recorded: December 1973
- Genre: Rock/Soul/Folk rock
- Length: 44:05
- Label: Hybrid Recordings
- Producer: Ben Sidran

Paul Pena chronology
Paul Pena (1971)	New Train (2000)

Professional ratings
Review scores
Source	Rating
Allmusic	link
Rolling Stone	link

New Train is an album by Paul Pena, recorded in 1973 and released in 2000. The album was recorded at Bearsville Records and produced by Ben Sidran (keyboardist for the Steve Miller Band).

== The album ==
New Train features Grateful Dead member Jerry Garcia playing pedal steel guitar and Merl Saunders (frequent collaborator with Garcia and the Dead) on keyboards on "Venutian Lady" and "New Train", and the a cappella group The Persuasions singing on "Gonna Move" and "Let's Move and Groove."

Stylistically, the album runs the gamut from straight-up rock and roll (on the original version of "Jet Airliner") to folk to acid rock (on the Jimi Hendrix-esque "Cosmic Mirror") to Rhythm and Blues on the standout track "Gonna Move". The Grateful Dead-inspired "Venutian Lady" echoes their hit "Bertha".

Albert Grossman, owner of Bearsville Records, stopped release of the record after a dispute, possibly over the marketability of the record, or, according to Sidran, Pena's refusal to relocate to the East Coast to work more closely with Grossman.

Ben Sidran gave an unreleased copy of New Train to Steve Miller, who recorded Pena's "Jet Airliner" with his band for their 1977 album Book of Dreams. The "Jet Airliner" single went to #8 on the Billboard chart. Pena's primary source of income in his later years were royalties from that single.

The album remained unreleased for 27 years. After years of unsuccessful attempts, Pena's attorney (and original executive producer on the album) Jon Waxman negotiated for the album's release in 2000 on the New York-based Hybrid Recordings label.

== Track listing ==
All songs written by Pena except as indicated.

1. "Gonna Move" – 4:31
2. "New Train" – 4:53
3. "Jet Airliner" – 5:42
4. "Wait On What You Want" – 3:28
5. "Venutian Lady" – 4:43
6. "Cosmic Mirror" – 5:23
7. "Let's Move And Groove Together" (Johnny Nash) – 4:13
8. "Indian Boy" – 4:37
9. "A Bit Of All Right" – 3:43
10. "Taking Your Love Down" – 2:52

== Personnel ==
- Paul Pena - guitar, piano and vocals
- Ben Sidran - piano and organ
- Harvey Brooks - bass guitar
- Gary Mallaber - drums and percussion

== Special guests ==
- Jerry Garcia - pedal steel guitar on "Venutian Lady" and "New Train"
- Merl Saunders - keyboards on "Venutian Lady" and "New Train"
- The Persuasions - background vocals on "Gonna Move"
- Charles Greene - background vocals on "Let's Move and Groove Together"
- Arthur Adams - guitar on "A Bit of All Right"
- Dave Woodward - saxophone on "Cosmic Mirror"
- Nick DeCaro - arranged strings
- The Funky ladies - additional background vocals

== Production ==
- Producer: Ben Sidran
- Executive Producers: Jon M. Waxman and Gunther Weil
- Engineers: Adam Taylor and Bruce Botnick
- Mixing: Ben Sidran and Marty Feldman
- Mastering: George Marino
- Liner Notes: Ben Sidran
- Slipcase photograph: Jennifer Cheek Pantaleon
- Recorded at Intermedia in Boston and Wally Heider Studios in San Francisco
