= A Genuine Tong Funeral =

Studio album by Gary Burton
- Released: 1968
- Recorded: July 1967
- Genre: Jazz
- Length: 43:35
- Label: RCA
- Producer: Brad McCuen

Gary Burton chronology
| Lofty Fake Anagram (1967) | A Genuine Tong Funeral (1968) | Gary Burton Quartet in Concert (1968) |

A Genuine Tong Funeral is an album by vibraphonist Gary Burton featuring compositions by Carla Bley, recorded in 1967 and released on the RCA label in 1968. It features Burton with Bley herself on keyboards and conducting an expanded ensemble consisting of trumpeter Michael Mantler, trombonist Jimmy Knepper, tenor saxophonist Gato Barbieri, soprano saxophonist Steve Lacy, baritone saxophonist Howard Johnson, guitarist Larry Coryell, bassist Steve Swallow and drummer Bob Moses.

== Reception ==
Professional ratings
Review scores
| Source | Rating |
|---|---|
| The Penguin Guide to Jazz Recordings | 3.5/4 stars |

AllMusic awarded the album 4½ stars, with Scott Yanow stating: "One of vibraphonist Gary Burton's most intriguing recordings... The music is dramatic, occasionally a little humorous, and a superb showcase for Gary Burton's vibes".

== Track listing ==
All compositions by Carla Bley.

1. "The Opening / Interlude : Shovels / The Survivors / Grave Train" - 6:37
2. "Death Rolls" - 1:36
3. "Morning (Part 1)" - 1:43
4. "Interlude : Lament / Intermission Music" - 4:28
5. "Silent Spring" - 7:58
6. "Fanfare / Mother of the Dead Man" - 2:51
7. "Some Dirge" - 7:47
8. "Morning (Part 2)" - 1:17
9. "The New Funeral March" - 2:40
10. "The New National Anthem / The Survivors" - 6:34
- Recorded in New York City in July 1967.

== Personnel ==
- Gary Burton – vibraphone
- Carla Bley – conductor, piano, organ
- Michael Mantler – trumpet
- Jimmy Knepper – trombone, bass trombone
- Howard Johnson – tuba, baritone saxophone
- Steve Lacy – soprano saxophone
- Gato Barbieri – tenor saxophone
- Larry Coryell – guitar
- Steve Swallow – double bass
- Bob Moses – drums
