= Lorraine Desmarais =

Jazz pianist and composer

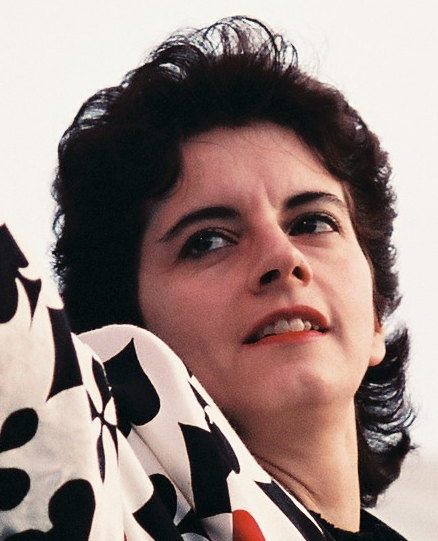

Background information
- Born: 15 August 1956 (age 68); Montreal, Quebec, Canada
- Genres: Jazz
- Occupation: Pianist
- Instrument: Piano
- Website: www.lorrainedesmarais.com

Lorraine Desmarais C.M. (born August 15, 1956) is a French-Canadian jazz pianist and composer.

== Early life and education ==
Born in Montreal, she earned a Bachelor of Music (1977) and Master of Music (1979) in classical piano at Université de Sherbrooke. She studied with Armas Maiste at McGill University in 1978 and 1979, and later took lessons from Kenny Barron in New York. She has also been influenced by Chick Corea and Oscar Peterson.

== Career ==
Desmarais has recorded ten albums as a solo performer and musical director, including several with well-known artists such as Michel Cusson and Michel Donato (Vision), Tiger Okoshi (Lorraine Desmarais), Don Alias (Andiamo), André Moisan, Jean Gaudreault and Ted Baskin from the Montreal Symphony Orchestra and Michel Bettez from the Orchestre Métropolitain (Bleu Silence), in addition to her long-standing team of Frédéric Alarie (double bass) and Camil Bélisle (drums). She has composed a number of pieces for herself and for other performers, including Oliver Jones and Angèle Dubeau.

She has been teaching in colleges and universities since 1985, and is a jazz piano professor at the Cégep Saint-Laurent in Montreal.

Desmarais was appointed a member of the Order of Canada in 2012.

== Discography ==
- Trio Lorraine Desmarais (Radio Canada, 1985)
- Andiamo (Radio Canada, 1986)
- Pianissimo (Radio Canada, 1987)
- Vision (Les Disques Scherzo, 1991)
- Lorraine Desmarais (Select, 1991)
- Bleu silence (Les Disques Scherzo, 1999)
- Love (Les Disques Scherzo, 2002)
- Jazz pour Noel / Jazz for Christmas with Jean-Pierre Zanella (Analekta, 2005)
- Live Club Soda with Tiger Okoshi and Michel Cusson (Analekta, 2007)
- Lorraine Desmarais Big Band (Analekta, 2009)
- Couleurs de lune (Analekta, 2012)
- Danses danzas dances (Analekta, 2016)
- Street Beat Suite (Analekta, 2023)

With Five Play

- On the brink (Arbors Records, 1999)
