= Jon Weber (musician) =

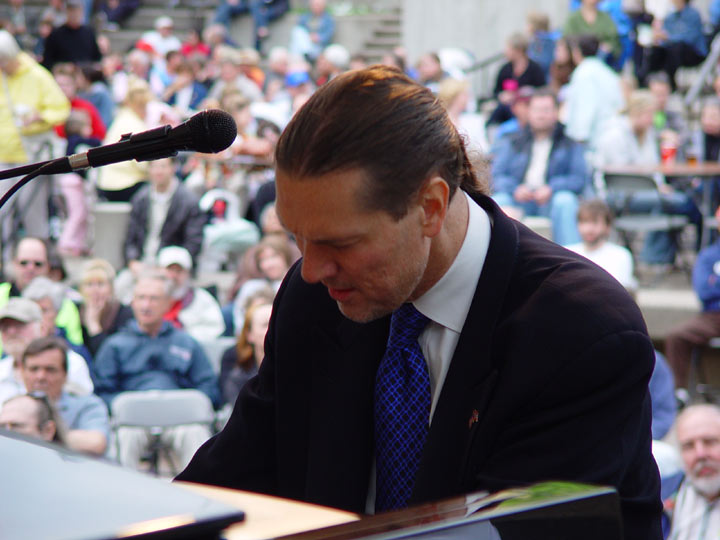
- Weber performing in 2010

Background information
- Genres: Jazz, post-bop, fusion, stride
- Occupations: Musician, composer
- Instruments: Piano, synthesizer
- Years active: 1979–present
- Label: 2nd Century Jazz

Jon Weber (born 1961, Milwaukee, Wisconsin) is a New York City and Chicago-based jazz pianist and composer whose compositions and performances have met critical and popular acclaim in many countries around the world. Largely self-taught, Weber has perfect pitch and remarkable melodic recall. He serves as host of Piano Jazz With Jon Weber on NPR.

== Early life ==
Weber began playing at a very young age. He lived and performed for many years in Chicago, and currently resides in New York City. He has performed and recorded with a broad range of musicians in the United States, Europe, India, Japan, and Australia.

== Later life and career ==
Weber's album Jazz Wagon was released in 1993 on imi Records, followed by a live album, Flying Keys, and It's Never Quite the Same, an album of tunes by composers Jay Livingston and Ray Evans. His most recent album, Simple Complex, features his own compositions. It was released in 2004 with Weber on piano, drummer Mark Walker, Eric Alexander on sax, trumpeters Diego Urcola and Roy Hargrove, bassists Avishai Cohen, Niels-Henning Ørsted Pedersen, Peter Washington and Gary Burton on vibraphone.

Weber produces and performs a popular concert series entitled 'From Joplin to Jarrett: 100 Years of Piano Jazz', which received positive reviews in such publications as The New York Times and the Wall Street Journal. (Review in external links below)

Weber's broadcast appearances have included NPR's Piano Jazz with the late pianist Marian McPartland, and Jazz Inspired with Judy Carmichael. In 2012 he began hosting an updated version of the popular Piano Jazz program, now called Piano Jazz with Jon Weber on NPR, replacing Mrs. McPartland, who stepped down from her longtime hosting duties in the fall of 2011.
