= Country Roads & Other Places =

Studio album by Gary Burton Quartet
- Released: 1969
- Recorded: September 24–27, 1968
- Genre: Jazz
- Length: 34:13
- Label: RCA Victor
- Producer: Brad McCuen

Gary Burton chronology
Gary Burton Quartet in Concert (1968)	Country Roads & Other Places (1969)	Throb (1969)

Country Roads & Other Places is an album by vibraphonist Gary Burton, recorded in 1968 and released in 1969 on the RCA Victor label. Burton doubles on piano with a quartet of guitarist Jerry Hahn, bassist Steve Swallow and drummer Roy Haynes.

== Reception ==
The AllMusic review by Scott Yanow stated, "In addition to both melodic and advanced jazz, Burton incorporates elements of country, rock, pop and even classical music on this fairly rare LP... the music is full of logical surprises that foreshadow the eclectic nature of much of '80s and '90s jazz".

Professional ratings
Review scores
Source	Rating
AllMusic	4/5 stars
The Penguin Guide to Jazz Recordings	3.5/4 stars

== Track listing ==
1. "Country Roads" (Gary Burton, Steve Swallow) - 5:06
2. "The Green Mountains" (Swallow) - 3:41
3. "True or False" (Swallow) - 1:45
4. "Gone, But Forgotten" (Burton, Mike Gibbs) - 3:45
5. "Ravel Prelude (Le tombeau de Couperin: Prelude)" (Maurice Ravel) - 3:14
6. "And on the Third Day" (Gibbs) - 4:06
7. "A Singing Song" (Burton) - 2:46
8. "Wichita Breakdown" (Burton, Jerry Hahn) - 2:43
9. "My Foolish Heart" (Ned Washington, Victor Young) - 2:30
10. "A Family Joy" (Gibbs) - 4:45
- Recorded at RCA's Studio B in New York City.

== Personnel ==
- Gary Burton – vibraphone, piano
- Jerry Hahn – guitar (tracks 1–4 and 6–10)
- Steve Swallow – bass (tracks 1–4 and 6–10)
- Roy Haynes – drums (tracks 1–4 and 6–10)
