= Good Vibes (Gary Burton album) =

Studio album by Gary Burton
- Released: 1970
- Recorded: September 2–4, 1969, March 11, 1970
- Studio: Atlantic, New York
- Genre: Jazz
- Length: 36:32
- Label: Atlantic
- Producer: Joel Dorn

Gary Burton chronology
Throb (1969)	Good Vibes (1970)	Gary Burton & Keith Jarrett (1971)

Good Vibes is an album by vibraphonist Gary Burton, recorded 1969–70 and released on the Atlantic label in 1970.

== Reception ==
The AllMusic review by Ken Dryden described the album as being "rather dated and less satisfying than the vast majority of his other recordings from the era".

Professional ratings
Review scores
Source	Rating
AllMusic	2.5/5 stars
The Penguin Guide to Jazz Recordings	2.5/4 stars
The Rolling Stone Jazz Record Guide	3/5 stars

== Track listing ==
All compositions by Gary Burton except where noted.

1. "Vibrafinger" – 6:37
2. "Las Vegas Tango" (Gil Evans) – 6:30
3. "Boston Marathon" – 7:19
4. "Pain in My Heart" (Naomi Neville) – 4:46
5. "Leroy the Magician" – 6:10
6. "I Never Loved a Man (The Way I Love You)" (Ronnie Shannon) – 5:11

- Recorded at Atlantic Recording Studios in New York on September 2–4, 1969.

== Personnel ==
- Gary Burton – vibraphone, piano, organ
- Eric Gale, Jerry Hahn, Sam Brown – guitar
- Richard Tee – piano, organ
- Steve Swallow – bass, electric bass
- Chuck Rainey – electric bass
- Bernard Purdie, Bill Lavorgna – drums, percussion
