= Compost (album) =

Take Off Your Body

Studio album by Compost
- Released: 1972
- Genre: Jazz
- Labels: Columbia KC 31176; CBS/Sony SOPL-33

Compost chronology
Take Off Your Body (1972)	Life Is Round (1973)

Jack DeJohnette chronology
Have You Heard? (1970)	Take Off Your Body (1972)	Ruta and Daitya (1973)

Professional ratings
Review scores
Source	Rating
Allmusic	2/5 stars

Compost (also titled Take Off Your Body) is the debut album from Compost. It features Jack DeJohnette, Bob Moses, Harold Vick, Jack Gregg and Jumma Santos. The album was recorded in 1971 and released on Columbia Records.

== Track listing ==
All compositions by Jack DeJohnette except as indicated

1. "Take Off Your Body" (Bob Moses)
2. "Thinkin'"
3. "Bwaata" (Moses, DeJohnette)
4. "Happy Peace"
5. "Country Song" (Jack Gregg, DeJohnette)
6. "Sweet Berry Wine" (DeJohnette, Moses, Harold Vick, Jumma Santos, Gregg)
7. "Funky Feet" (DeJohnette, Moses, Vick, Santos, Gregg)
8. "Inflation Blues"

== Personnel ==
- Jack DeJohnette – clavinet, organ, vibes, drums
- Bob Moses – drums, vocal
- Harold Vick – tenor saxophone, flute
- Jack Gregg – bass
- Jumma Santos – congas, percussion
