= The New Quartet =

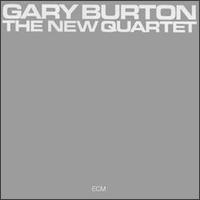

Studio album by Gary Burton
- Released: 1973
- Recorded: March 5–6, 1973
- Genre: Jazz
- Length: 45:56
- Label: ECM 1030 ST
- Producer: Manfred Eicher

Gary Burton chronology
Crystal Silence (1973)	The New Quartet (1973)	Seven Songs for Quartet and Chamber Orchestra (1974)

Professional ratings
Review scores
Source	Rating
AllMusic	4/5 stars
The Penguin Guide to Jazz Recordings	3/4 stars
The Rolling Stone Jazz Record Guide	4/5 stars

The New Quartet is an album by jazz vibraphonist Gary Burton, recorded over two days in March 1973 and released on ECM later that year. The quartet features rhythm section Mick Goodrick, Abraham Laboriel and Harry Blazer.

== Track listing ==
1. "Open Your Eyes, You Can Fly" (Chick Corea) - 6:40
2. "Coral" (Keith Jarrett) - 4:03
3. "Tying Up Loose Ends" (Gordon Beck) - 5:12
4. "Brownout" (Gary Burton) - 6:32
5. "Olhos de gato" (Carla Bley) - 5:38
6. "Mallet Man" (Gordon Beck) - 7:11
7. "Four or Less" (Mike Gibbs) - 6:10
8. "Nonsequence" (Mike Gibbs) - 4:30

== Personnel ==
- Gary Burton – vibraphone
- Michael Goodrick – guitar
- Abraham Laboriel – bass
- Harry Blazer – drums
