= Simple Complex =

Studio album by Jon Weber
- Released: 2004
- Recorded: 2003
- Studio: Deaf Dog Studios, Chicago
- Genre: Jazz
- Length: 1:03:49
- Label: 2nd Century Jazz
- Producer: Jon Weber

Jon Weber chronology
It's Never Quite the Same (1998)	Simple Complex (2004)

Simple Complex is a jazz album of original compositions by pianist Jon Weber. The album, which was released in 2004 by the 2nd Century Jazz Label, features Weber on piano, drummer Mark Walker, Eric Alexander on sax, trumpeters Diego Urcola and Roy Hargrove, bassists Avishai Cohen, the late Niels-Henning Ørsted Pedersen, Peter Washington and Gary Burton on vibraphone.

== Reception ==
Professional ratings
Review scores
Source	Rating
All About Jazz	4.5/5 stars
AllMusic	4/5 stars

The Chicago Tribune rated Simple Complex as the number one jazz CD of 2004. Critic Howard Reich praised "the originality of [Weber's] compositions, the ingenuity of his arrangements and the high sheen of the ensemble performances," and wrote: "even Weber's more ardent fans never could have guessed that the man can write and arrange at such an exalted level."

In a review for AllMusic, Scott Yanow commented: "The music ranges from 1960s hard bop to some more explorative playing that utilizes tricky rhythms and complex chord changes... Weber is generous in allocating solo space... The originals are excellent and a few of them... deserve to catch on."

Matt Merewitz of All About Jazz stated: "Jon Weber is a virtuoso, pure and simple. Weber delivers what amounts to a five star effort if only for his program of all original compositions, incisive in its compositional aesthetic." AAJ's Elliott Simon remarked: "Weber has mixed and matched some of the world's best musicians to present and interpret his work... this is broad, quick-paced music that uplifts with a bursting rhythmic intensity."

== Track listing ==
Composed by Jon Weber.

1. "Hot Ice" – 7:12
2. "No More Words" – 4:12
3. "Drastic Steps" – 5:22
4. "Mister Kleckley" – 6:37
5. "Simple Complex" – 7:38
6. "While She's Dreaming" – 5:15
7. "Is It Only Me?" – 7:04
8. "Jolie" – 4:25
9. "Whatever You Say" – 8:17
10. "Triska Deka" – 7:50

== Personnel ==
- Jon Weber – piano
- Eric Alexander – tenor saxophone (tracks 1, 3, 4, 5, 7, 9, and 10)
- Paul McCandless – oboe (track 6)
- Diego Urcola – trumpet (tracks 1, 3, 4, 5, 7, 9, and 10)
- Roy Hargrove – flügelhorn (track 2)
- Gary Burton – vibraphone (tracks 1, 4, 5, 8, and 10)
- John Moulder – acoustic guitar (track 8)
- John Ovnik – electric bass, sitar (tracks 1, 5, and 7)
- Peter Washington – double bass (track 3)
- Matt Clohesy – double bass (track 4)
- Niels-Henning Ørsted Pedersen – double bass (tracks 6 and 8)
- Avishai Cohen – double bass (tracks 7, 9, and 10)
- Mark Walker – drums, bongos (tracks 1, 3, 4, 5, 7, 8, 9, and 10)
- Jonas Johansen – drums (tracks 6 and 8)
- Rubén Alvarez – timbales (track 9)
- Siri Sonty – tanbura (track 7)
- Kalyan Pathak – tabla (track 7)
- Kurt Elling – vocals (track 7)
- Alicia Reneé – vocals (track 7)
