= Dreams So Real (album) =

Studio album by the Gary Burton Quintet
- Released: June 1976
- Recorded: December 1975
- Studio: Studio Bauer; Ludwigsburg, W. Germany
- Genre: Jazz
- Length: 38:31
- Label: ECM; ECM 1072 ST
- Producer: Manfred Eicher

Gary Burton chronology
Matchbook (1975)	Dreams So Real (1976)	Passengers (1977)

Dreams So Real: Music of Carla Bley is an album by the Gary Burton Quintet, featuring compositions by Carla Bley, recorded in December 1975 and released on ECM the following year. The quintet features guitarists Mick Goodrick and Pat Metheny and rhythm section Steve Swallow and Bob Moses.

== Reception ==
AllMusic's Michael G. Nastos states, "Generally regarded as one of Burton's top three recorded dates, it has stood the test of time. Perhaps some day, a complete collection of the vibist playing Carla Bley's many other compositions can be compiled to complement this surface-scratching but very important album."

Professional ratings
Review scores
Source	Rating
AllMusic	4.5/5 stars
The Penguin Guide to Jazz Recordings	2.5/4 stars
The Rolling Stone Jazz Record Guide	3/5 stars

== Track listing ==
All tracks are written by Carla Bley.

Side I
No.	Title	Length
1.	"Dreams So Real"	6:25
2.	"Ictus / Syndrome / Wrong Key Donkey"	10:27
3.	"Jesus Maria"	3:50
Total length:		20:42

Side II
No.	Title	Length
1.	"Vox humana"	7:04
2.	"Doctor"	4:16
3.	"Intermission Music"	6:29
Total length:		17:49

== Personnel ==
- Gary Burton – vibraphone
- Mick Goodrick – guitar
- Pat Metheny – electric 12-string guitar
- Steve Swallow – bass guitar
- Bob Moses – drums

== Charts ==
The album reached number twenty-five in Billboards Jazz albums charts.

Year	Chart	Position
1976	Billboard Jazz Albums	2
