= Vista (Marion Brown album) =

Studio album by Marion Brown
- Released: 1975
- Recorded: February 18–19, 1975
- Studios: Generation Sound Studios, New York City
- Genre: Jazz
- Length: 41:20
- Labels: Impulse! ASD 9304
- Producer: Ed Michel

Marion Brown chronology
Sweet Earth Flying (1974)	Vista (1975)	Awofofora (1976)

Vista is an album by American jazz saxophonist Marion Brown recorded in 1975 and released on the Impulse! label.

== Reception ==
The AllMusic review by Scott Yanow states: "This disc certainly boasts an impressive backup crew but does not seem to know what it wants to be. The solos are relatively short... and little that is all that memorable actually occurs. Better to acquire Marion Brown's earlier recordings".

Professional ratings
Review scores
Source	Rating
AllMusic	4/5 stars

== Track listing ==
1. "Maimoun" (Stanley Cowell) – 7:33
2. "Visions" (Stevie Wonder) – 5:40
3. "Vista" (Marion Brown) – 7:44
4. "Moment of Truth" (Bill Braynon) – 4:36
5. "Bismillahi 'Rrahmani' Rrahim" (Harold Budd) – 6:02
6. "Djinji" (Braynon) – 9:45

== Personnel ==
- Marion Brown — alto saxophone, wind chimes
- Stanley Cowell (tracks 1–3, 5–6)
- Anthony Davis — piano, electric piano
- Bill Braynon — celeste, electric piano (tracks 2–5)
- Reggie Workman — bass (tracks 1 & 3–6)
- Jimmy Hopps — drums (tracks 1 & 3–5)
- Ed Blackwell — drums, slit drums, (tracks 3 & 6)
- Jose Goico — congas, tambourine (tracks 1 & 3–6)
- Allen Murphy – vocals (track 2), bells (track 5)
- Harold Budd — celeste, gong (track 5)

== Production credits ==
- Ed Michel – Producer
- Tony May – Recording engineering (Generation Sound, NYC)
- Baker Bigsby – Mix engineering and additional recording (Westone Audio, LA)
