= Jazz Inspired =

- Genre: Jazz
- Running time: 1 hour
- Country of origin: United States
- Language(s): English
- Syndicates: C&D Productions
- Hosted by: Judy Carmichael
- Website: www.jazzinspired.com

Jazz Inspired is a weekly radio series hosted by Judy Carmichael. The program is broadcast on more than 170 radio stations throughout the United States and Canada, as well as Sirius XM Satellite radio's NPR Now. The one-hour broadcast features jazz musicians as well as jazz-related topics. The guests have ranged from jazz piano great Jon Weber, to magician Penn Jillette to Christopher Guest and Billy Joel. The program has a special focus on creativity and inspiration.

Judy Carmichael is herself an accomplished pianist.
