= Geechee Recollections =

Studio album by Marion Brown
- Released: 1973
- Recorded: June 4 & 5, 1973; Intermedia Sound, Boston
- Genre: Jazz
- Length: 43:47
- Label: Impulse!
- Producer: Ed Michel

Marion Brown chronology
Duets (1973)	Geechee Recollections (1973)	Sweet Earth Flying (1974)

Geechee Recollections is an album by the American jazz saxophonist Marion Brown recorded in 1973 and released on the Impulse! label. Along with Afternoon of a Georgia Faun and Sweet Earth Flying, it was one of Brown's albums dedicated to the US state of Georgia. The Geechee of the title are an African-American cultural group living in costal regions of Georgia and North Carolina, from whom Brown descended.

== Reception ==
Professional ratings
Review scores
Source	Rating
Allmusic	4/5 stars
Tom Hull – on the Web	B+

The Allmusic reviewer Brian Olewnick awarded the album 4 stars, writing, "Brown receives excellent support by a strong ensemble including trumpeter Leo Smith and the great drummer Steve McCall. Brown, with his marvelously limpid tone on alto, is a joy to hear and seems more at home and relaxed here than on some of his more strident early records. Recommended". The New York Times described his trio of Georgia-related albums as "his most notable recordings".

== Track listing ==
All compositions by Marion Brown except as indicated
No.	Title	Writer(s)	Length
1.	"Once upon a Time"		6:27
2.	"Karintha"	Brown, Jean Toomer	9:27
3.	"Buttermilk Bottom"		6:44
4.	"Introduction"		1:19
5.	"Tokalokaloka Part One"		7:02
6.	"Tokalokaloka Part Two"		9:41
7.	"Tokalokaloka Part Three"		1:49
8.	"Ending"		1:18
Total length:			43:46

== Personnel ==
- Marion Brown — alto saxophone, soprano saxophone, clarinet, percussion
- Leo Smith — brass, strings, percussion
- William Malone — thumb piano, autoharp
- James Jefferson — double bass, cello, percussion
- Steve McCall — drums, percussion
- A. Kobena Adzenyah — drums, African percussion
- Jumma Santos — congas, miscellaneous instruments
- Bill Hasson — percussion, narration
