= Compost (band) =

American jazz fusion band

Compost was an American jazz fusion band that released two albums for Columbia Records.

Its members were Bob Moses, Harold Vick, Jumma Santos, Jack Gregg and Jack DeJohnette. The band was formed in 1971 as a cooperative, with the members splitting the proceeds of a contract DeJohnette negotiated with Columbia Records to make four records. De Johnette recalled in a 2011 interview that the name suited the band's makeup as "a potpourri of mixes of things: Jazz, rock, some soul and some free-form things", which resulted in "good compost music".

After recording their first album, Take off Your Body, they performed as a group in New York several times, notably as the opening band for Yes on February 19, 1972 at the Academy of Music. They were offered the opportunity to continue as an opening band for Yes's Fragile Tour but were unable to do so because of the lack of sponsorship by their record company to cover their expenses. After their second album the band was released from the contract with Columbia. Both records were later rereleased in compact disc format by Wounded Bird Records.

Their second album, Life Is Round, also featured Roland Prince and Ed Finney on guitar as well as singers Jeanne Lee and Lou Courtney.

== Discography ==
- 1971: Compost (also titled Take Off Your Body)
- 1973: Life Is Round
