= New Vibe Man in Town =

Studio album by Gary Burton
- Released: 1961
- Recorded: July 6–7, 1961
- Studio: RCA Victor Studio B, New York City
- Genre: Jazz
- Length: 33:57
- Label: RCA
- Producer: George Avakian

Gary Burton chronology
New Vibe Man in Town (1961)	Who Is Gary Burton? (1963)

New Vibe Man in Town is the debut album by vibraphonist Gary Burton, recorded in 1961 and released on the RCA label. It features Burton in a trio with bassist Gene Cherico and drummer Joe Morello (of Dave Brubeck fame).

== Reception ==
Professional ratings
Review scores
Source	Rating
AllMusic	4/5 stars
DownBeat	3.5/5 stars

The AllMusic review by Scott Yanow stated: "Vibraphonist Gary Burton's debut as a leader shows that he was a brilliant player from the start of his career... This boppish set is easily recommended".

== Track listing ==
1. "Joy Spring" (Clifford Brown) - 3:39
2. "Over the Rainbow" (Harold Arlen, Yip Harburg) - 4:21
3. "Like Someone in Love" (Johnny Burke, Jimmy van Heusen) - 3:05
4. "Minor Blues" (Arif Mardin) - 5:30
5. "Our Waltz" (David Rose) - 4:30
6. "So Many Things" (Marian McPartland) - 4:14
7. "Sir John" (Blue Mitchell) - 4:10
8. "You Stepped Out of a Dream" (Nacio Herb Brown, Gus Kahn) - 4:28

- Recorded at RCA Victor's Studio B in New York City on July 6 & 7, 1961.

== Personnel ==
- Gary Burton – vibraphone
- Gene Cherico – bass
- Joe Morello – drums
