= Paul Pena (album) =

Studio album by Paul Pena
- Released: 1971
- Recorded: November 1971
- Genre: Soul, blues, rock
- Length: 40:06
- Label: Capitol
- Producer: Gunther Weil

Paul Pena chronology
Paul Pena (1971)	New Train (1973)

Professional ratings
Review scores
Source	Rating
AllMusic	3.5/5 stars
Christgau's Record Guide	A−

Paul Pena is the 1971 debut album by blind singer-songwriter Paul Pena (1950-2005). After 40 years out of print, the album has been officially re-released in mp3 format and is available at amazon.com and the iTunes Store.

== Track listing ==
All songs written by Paul Pena except where noted.

1. "Woke Up This Morning" – 4:50
2. "I'm Gonna Make It Alright" – 4:07
3. "The River" – 6:03
4. "One for the Lonely" – 4:48
5. "Something to Make You Happy" – 7:05
6. "My Adorable One" (Ida Irral Berger/Clara Thompson) – 3:30
7. "When I'm Gone" – 4:33
8. "Lullaby" – 5:10

== Personnel ==
- Paul Pena – guitar, keyboards (on "The River"), lead vocals, background vocals
- Jesse Raye – bass, background vocals
- Jim Wilkins – drums
- Ed Costa – keyboards, background vocals
- Jeff Baxter – steel guitar
- Jumma Santos – congas, maracas
- Betsy Morse – harp
- Clarice Taylor – background vocals
- Ellis Hall – background vocals
- Gil Thomas – background vocals
- Earl Frost – background vocals
- Ronnie Ingraham Concert Choir – background vocals (on "The River")

== Production ==
- Producer: Gunther Weil
- Engineers: Adam Taylor
- Mixing: Adam Taylor
- Photography: Steve Hansen
- Cover Art: Julia Pearl
- Liner Notes: Gerd Stern
- A&R Coordinator: Michael Sunday
- Recorded at Intermedia in Boston
