= Passengers (Gary Burton album) =

Studio album by the Gary Burton Quartet with Eberhard Weber
- Released: 1977
- Recorded: November 1976
- Studio: Talent, Oslo, Norway
- Genre: Jazz
- Length: 40:48
- Label: ECM; ECM 1092 ST
- Producer: Manfred Eicher

Gary Burton chronology
Dreams So Real (1976)	Passengers (1977)	Times Square (1978)

Passengers is an album by American jazz vibraphonist Gary Burton, with German jazz bassist Eberhard Weber. It was recorded for ECM in November 1976 and released the following year. Burton's quartet features rhythm section Pat Metheny, Steve Swallow and Danny Gottlieb.

== Reception ==
Professional ratings
Review scores
Source	Rating
AllMusic	4/5 stars
The Rolling Stone Jazz Record Guide	4/5 stars

The AllMusic review by Scott Yanow states, "Although none of the individual songs caught on, the attractive sound of the post-bop unit and an opportunity to hear Pat Metheny in his formative period make this a CD reissue worth exploring."

== Track listing ==
All tracks are written by Pat Metheny, except as noted.

Side I
No.	Title	Writer(s)	Length
1.	"Sea Journey"	Chick Corea	9:18
2.	"Nacada"		4:15
3.	"The Whopper"		5:32

Side II
No.	Title	Writer(s)	Length
1.	"B & G (Midwestern Nights Dream)"		8:26
2.	"Yellow Fields"	Weber	7:02
3.	"Claude and Betty"	Swallow	6:15

== Personnel ==
The Gary Burton Quartet with Eberhard Weber

- Gary Burton – vibraphone
- Eberhard Weber – bass
- Pat Metheny – guitar
- Steve Swallow – bass guitar
- Dan Gottlieb – drums

Technical personnel

- Manfred Eicher – producer
- Jan Erik Kongshaug – recording engineer
- Bob Ludwig – mastering at Masterdisk, NYC, USA
- Dieter Bonhorst – layout
- Lajos Keresztes – cover photography
- Roberto Masotti – photography
