= Gary Burton Quartet in Concert =

Live album by Gary Burton Quartet
- Released: 1968
- Recorded: February 23, 1968
- Venue: Carnegie Recital Hall, New York City
- Genre: Jazz
- Length: 49:55
- Label: RCA
- Producer: Brad McCuen

Gary Burton chronology
A Genuine Tong Funeral (1968)	Gary Burton Quartet in Concert (1968)	Country Roads & Other Places (1969)

Gary Burton Quartet in Concert is a live album by vibraphonist Gary Burton recorded in 1968 at Carnegie Hall and released by RCA. Burton’s quartet consists of guitarist Larry Coryell, bassist Steve Swallow and drummer Bob Moses.

== Reception ==
Scott Yanow of Allmusic stated: "The material (by Mike Gibbs, Burton, Coryell and Bob Dylan) is quite strong, and there are some hints of the avant-garde".

Professional ratings
Review scores
Source	Rating
Allmusic	4/5 stars

== Track listing ==
All compositions by Gary Burton, except where indicated.

1. "Blue Comedy" (Mike Gibbs) – 9:02
2. "The Sunset Bell" – 5:17
3. "Lines" (Larry Coryell) – 3:06
4. "Walter L." – 6:36
5. "Wrong Is Right" (Coryell) – 6:14
6. "Dreams" – 5:49
7. "I Want You" (Bob Dylan) – 3:06
8. "One, Two, 1–2–3–4" (Burton, Coryell) – 10:45

== Personnel ==
- Gary Burton — vibraphone
- Larry Coryell — guitar
- Steve Swallow — double bass
- Bob Moses — drums
