= Lofty Fake Anagram =

Studio album by Gary Burton
- Released: 1967
- Recorded: August 15–17, 1967
- Genre: Jazz Fusion
- Length: 37:48
- Label: RCA
- Producer: Brad McCuen, Darol Rice

Gary Burton chronology
Duster (1967)	Lofty Fake Anagram (1967)	A Genuine Tong Funeral (1968)

Lofty Fake Anagram is an album by vibraphonist Gary Burton, recorded in 1967 and released on the RCA label. It features Burton with guitarist Larry Coryell, bassist Steve Swallow and drummer Bob Moses.

== Reception ==
The AllMusic review by Scott Yanow stated that "it is the interplay between Burton and the rockish Coryell in this early fusion group (predating Miles Davis' Bitches Brew by two years) that makes this session most notable".

Professional ratings
Review scores
Source	Rating
AllMusic	4.5/5 stars
The Penguin Guide to Jazz Recordings	3.5/4 stars
Rolling Stone	Positive

== Track listing ==
All compositions by Gary Burton except as indicated.

1. "June the 15, 1967" (Mike Gibbs) - 4:52
2. "Feelings and Things" (Gibbs) - 4:06
3. "Fleurette Africaine" (Duke Ellington) - 3:41
4. "I'm Your Pal" (Steve Swallow) - 3:05
5. "Lines" - 3:13
6. "The Beach" - 3:43
7. "Mother of the Dead Man" (Carla Bley) - 4:59
8. "Good Citizen Swallow" - 5:34
9. "General Mojo Cuts Up" (Swallow) - 4:35

- Recorded at RCA Victor's Music Center of the World, Hollywood, CA, on August 15–17, 1967.

== Personnel ==
- Gary Burton – vibraphone
- Larry Coryell – guitar
- Steve Swallow – bass
- Bob Moses – drums
