= Gary Burton =

American jazz vibraphonist (born 1943)

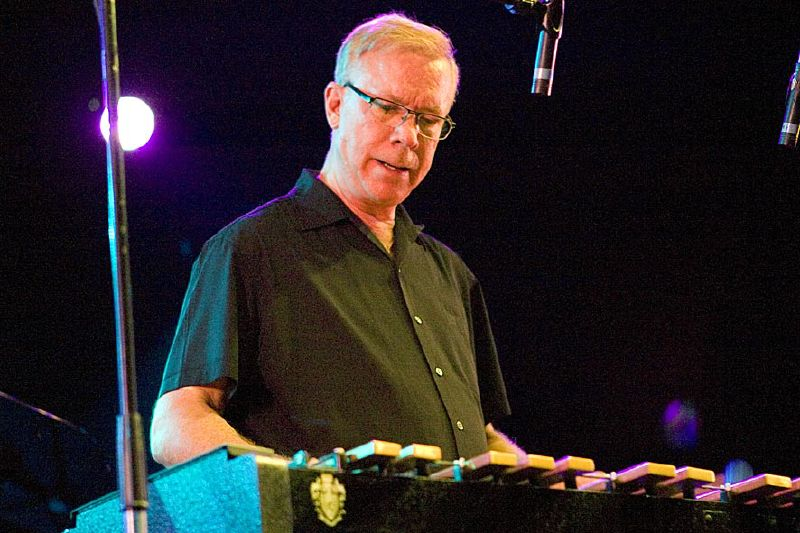
- Burton in 2008

Background information
- Born: January 23, 1943 (age 83); Anderson, Indiana, U.S.
- Genres: Jazz; fusion
- Occupations: Musician; composer; music educator
- Instrument: Vibraphone
- Years active: 1960–2017
- Labels: RCA; Atlantic; ECM; Concord; Mack Avenue

Gary Burton (born January 23, 1943) is an American retired jazz vibraphonist, composer, and educator. He developed a pianistic style of four-mallet technique as an alternative to the prevailing two-mallet technique. This approach caused him to be heralded as an innovator, and his sound and technique are widely imitated. He is also known for pioneering jazz fusion and popularizing the duet format in jazz, as well as being a major figure in music education from his 30 years teaching at the Berklee College of Music.

== Biography ==
Burton was born in Anderson, Indiana, United States. Beginning with music at six years old, he mostly taught himself to play the marimba and vibraphone. He began studying piano at age sixteen while finishing high school at Princeton Community High School in Princeton, Indiana (1956–60). He has cited jazz pianist Bill Evans as the inspiration for his approach to the vibraphone.

Burton attended Berklee College of Music in Boston, Massachusetts, in 1960–61, and the Stan Kenton Clinic at Indiana University in 1960. He studied with Herb Pomeroy and soon befriended composer and arranger Michael Gibbs. After establishing his career during the 1960s, he returned to join the staff of Berklee from 1971 to 2004, serving first as professor, then dean, and executive vice president, during his last decade at the college. In 1989, Burton received an Honorary Doctorate of Music from Berklee.

Early in his career, at the behest of Nashville saxophonist Boots Randolph, Burton moved to Nashville, Tennessee, and recorded with several musicians from the area, including guitarist Hank Garland, pianist Floyd Cramer, and guitarist Chet Atkins.

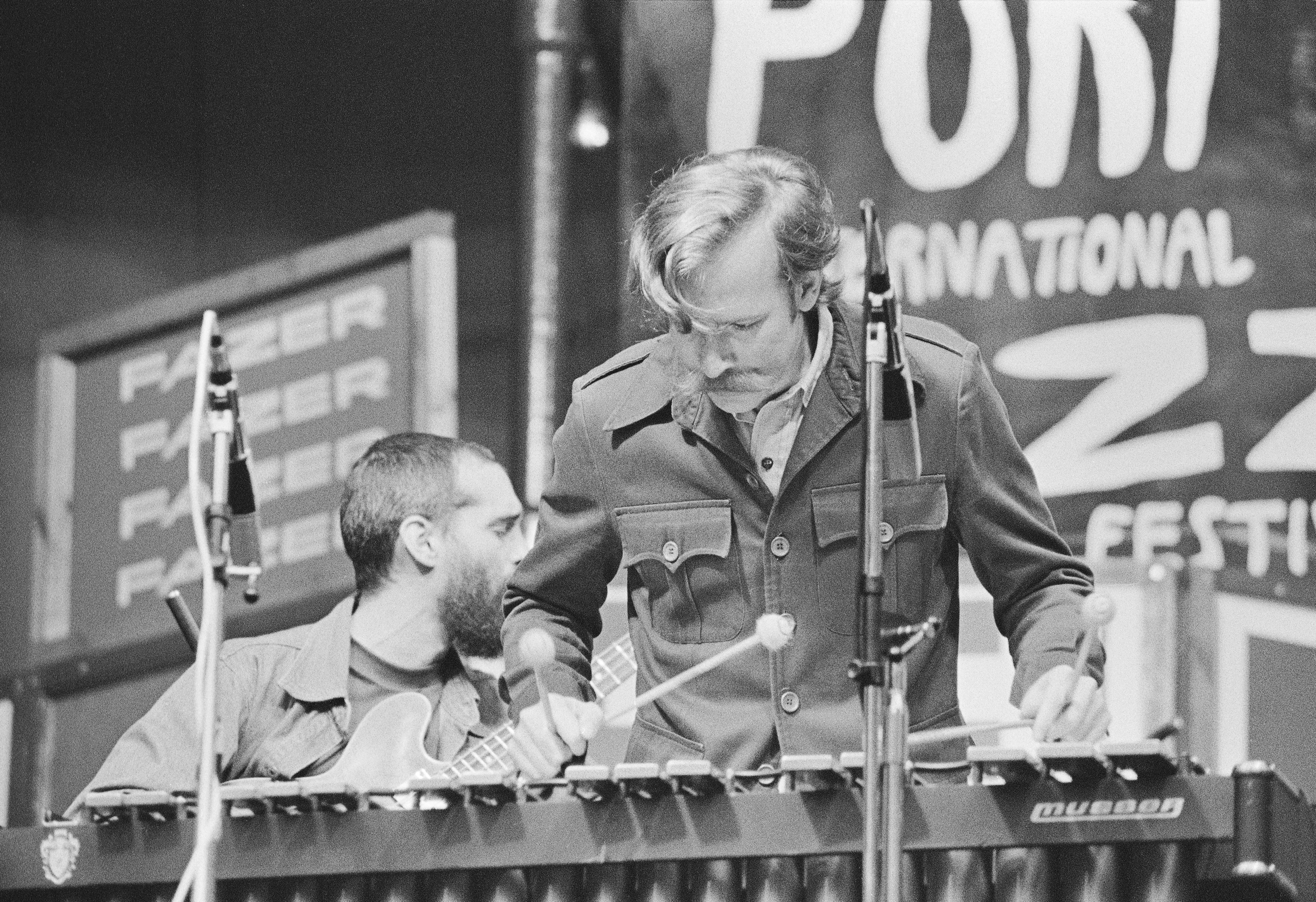
New Gary Burton Quartet at the Pori Jazz festival, Pori, Finland, 1974. Behind Burton is bassist Steve Swallow.

Burton toured the U.S. and Japan with pianist George Shearing. Shearing asked Burton to write a whole album of compositions for him which were released as Out of the Woods in 1965. Burton described the album in his autobiography, Learning to Listen, as his "most ambitious effort at composing and arranging". Burton played with saxophonist Stan Getz from 1964 to 1966. It was during this time that he appeared with the band in the movie Get Yourself a College Girl, playing "The Girl from Ipanema" with Astrud Gilberto. In 1967, he formed the Gary Burton Quartet with guitarist Larry Coryell, drummer Roy Haynes, and bassist Steve Swallow. Predating the jazz-rock fusion craze of the 1970s, the group's first album, Duster, combined jazz, country, and rock. However, some of Burton's previous albums (notably Tennessee Firebird and The Time Machine, both from 1966) had already shown his inclination toward such experimentation. After Coryell left the quartet in the late 1960s, Burton worked with guitarists Jerry Hahn, David Pritchard, Mick Goodrick, Pat Metheny, John Scofield, Wolfgang Muthspiel, Kurt Rosenwinkel, and Julian Lage.

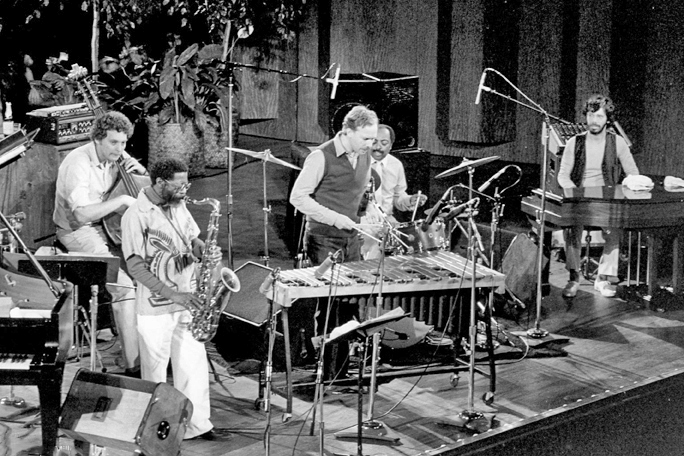
Burton with the Roy Haynes Quintet at the radio KJAZ Festival, Davies Symphony Hall, San Francisco, 1981. From left: Miroslav Vitouš, Joe Henderson, Burton, Roy Haynes, and Chick Corea.

Burton was named DownBeat magazine's Jazzman of the Year in 1968 (the youngest to receive that title) and won his first Grammy Award in 1972. The following year, Burton began a forty-year collaboration with pianist Chick Corea, recognized for popularizing the format of jazz duet performance. Their eight albums won Grammy Awards in 1979, 1981, 1997, 1999, 2009, and 2013.

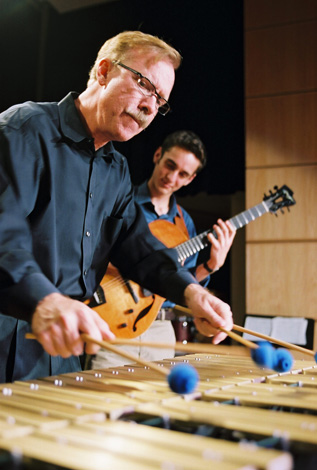
Burton with guitarist Julian Lage

Burton has played with a wide variety of jazz musicians, including Gato Barbieri, Carla Bley, Chick Corea, Peter Erskine, Stan Getz, Hank Garland, Stéphane Grappelli, Herbie Hancock, Keith Jarrett, B. B. King, Steve Lacy, Pat Metheny, Makoto Ozone, Tiger Okoshi, Astor Piazzolla, Tommy Smith, Ralph Towner, and Eberhard Weber.

Burton is known for his variation of traditional four-mallet grip which has come to be known as the "Burton grip", and is popular among jazz vibraphonists, as well as some concert marimbists, including Pius Cheung and Evelyn Glennie.

From 2004 to 2008, Burton hosted a weekly jazz radio show on Sirius Satellite Radio. In 2011, he released his first album for Mack Avenue Records, entitled Common Ground, featuring the New Gary Burton Quartet (with Julian Lage, Scott Colley, and Antonio Sánchez). In 2013, the group released Guided Tour, their second recording for Mack Avenue. Burton's autobiography, Learning to Listen, was published by Berklee Press in August 2013 and was voted "Jazz Book of the Year" by the Jazz Journalists Association.

Burton retired from performing in March 2017 following a farewell tour with pianist and longtime collaborator Makoto Ozone.

== Personal life ==
Burton is openly gay. He was married to Katherine Goldwyn in the early 1980s and has two children. He was in a homosexual relationship by the mid-1980s, and he came out publicly in a 1994 radio interview with Terry Gross. In 2013, he married Jonathan Chong in Provincetown, Massachusetts. Burton's current partner is Dustin Le.

== Discography ==
=== As leader/co-leader ===
Recording date	Title	Label	Year released	Notes
1961-07-06, -07	New Vibe Man in Town	RCA	1961	
1962-09-14, -15	Who Is Gary Burton?	RCA	1963	
1963-02-14, -20; 1963-03-11	3 in Jazz	RCA	1963	
1963-08-14 – -16	Something's Coming!	RCA	1964	
1964-12-21, -22	The Groovy Sound of Music	RCA	1965	
1966-04-05, -06	The Time Machine	RCA	1966	
1966-09-19 – -21	Tennessee Firebird	RCA	1967	
1967-04-18 – -20	Duster	RCA	1967	Quartet
1967-07	A Genuine Tong Funeral	RCA	1968	
1967-08-15 – 17	Lofty Fake Anagram	RCA	1967	
1968-02-23	Gary Burton Quartet in Concert	RCA	1968	Live
1968-09-24 – 27	Country Roads & Other Places	RCA	1969	
1969-06-02 – -05	Throb	Atlantic	1969	
1969-11-04	Paris Encounter with Stéphane Grappelli	Atlantic	1972	
1969-09-02 – -04, 1970-03-11	Good Vibes	Atlantic	1970	
1970-07-23	Gary Burton & Keith Jarrett	Atlantic	1971	
1971-06-02	Live in Tokyo	Atlantic	1971	Live at Sankei Hall, Tokyo
1971-06-19, 1971-09-07	Alone at Last	Atlantic	1972	3 tracks from live at the Montreux Jazz Festival
1972-11-06	Crystal Silence with Chick Corea	ECM	1973	
1973-03-05, -06	The New Quartet	ECM	1973	
1973-06-25, -26	In The Public Interest with Mike Gibbs	Polydor	1974	
1973-12	Seven Songs for Quartet and Chamber Orchestra	ECM	1974	
1974-05-13, -14	Hotel Hello with Steve Swallow	ECM	1975	
1974-07-23, -24	Ring with Eberhard Weber	ECM	1974	
1974-07-26, -27	Matchbook with Ralph Towner	ECM	1975	
1975-12	Dreams So Real	ECM	1976	
1976-11	Passengers with Eberhard Weber	ECM	1977	
1978-01	Times Square	ECM	1978	
1978-10-23 – -25	Duet with Chick Corea	ECM	1979	
1979-10-28	In Concert, Zürich, October 28, 1979 with Chick Corea	ECM	1980	Live at Limmathaus, Zürich
1980-06	Easy as Pie	ECM	1981	
1981-01	Live in Cannes	Jazz World	1996	Live at Palais des Festivals et des Congrès
1982-01	Picture This	ECM	1982	
1982-09	Lyric Suite for Sextet with Chick Corea	ECM	1983	
1984-11	Real Life Hits	ECM	1985	
1985-05	Slide Show with Ralph Towner	ECM	1986	
1985-07-28	Gary Burton And The Berklee Allstars	JVC	1986	
1986-06	Whiz Kids	ECM	1987	
1986-07	The New Tango with Astor Piazzolla	Atlantic	1987	Live at the Montreux Jazz Festival
1988?	Times Like These	GRP	1988	
1989-05-06 – -10	Reunion with Pat Metheny, Will Lee, Peter Erskine, Mitchel Forman	GRP	1990	
1990-03-29	Right Time, Right Place with Paul Bley	GNP Crescendo	1990	
1991?	Cool Nights	GRP	1991	
1991-10-10, 1992-04-25	Six Pack	GRP	1992	
1993-05	It's Another Day with Rebecca Parris	GRP	1994	
1994-10-31, 1994-11-01	Face to Face with Makoto Ozone	GRP	1995	
1994-11-08	Four Duke with Jay Leonhart, Joe Beck, Terry Clarke	LRC	1995	also released as Play the Music of Duke Ellington
1996-09-20 – -22	Departure	Concord Jazz	1997	
1996-12-02 – -05	Ástor Piazzolla Reunion: A Tango Excursion	Concord Jazz	1998	
1997-06	Native Sense - The New Duets with Chick Corea	Stretch	1997	
1997-12-15 – -17	Like Minds with Chick Corea, Pat Metheny, Roy Haynes, and Dave Holland	Concord Jazz	1998	
1999-01-20 – -24	Libertango: The Music of Ástor Piazzolla	Concord Jazz	2000	
2000-05-11, -23, -24, 2000-06--03	For Hamp, Red, Bags, and Cal	Concord Jazz	2001	
2001-08-14, -15, 2001-10-14, -15	Virtuosi with Makoto Ozone	Concord Jazz	2002	
2003-09-16 – -18	Generations	Concord Jazz	2004	
2004-11-08, -10	Next Generation	Concord Jazz	2005	
2007-06-10, -11	Quartet Live with Pat Metheny, Steve Swallow, Antonio Sanchez	Concord Jazz	2009	Live at Yoshi's, Oakland, California
2007–05, 2007-07	The New Crystal Silence with Chick Corea	Concord Jazz	2008	[2CD] Live
2011?	Common Ground	Mack Avenue	2011	
2012?	Hot House with Chick Corea	Concord Jazz	2012	
2013-03-21 – -23	Time Thread with Makoto Ozone	Universal	2013	
2013?	Guided Tour	Mack Avenue	2013	

Compilations

- Works (ECM, 1984)[LP]
- Collection (GRP, 1996)
- Take Another Look. A Career Retrospective (Mack Avenue, 2018)[5LP]

=== As a member ===
The Nashville All-Stars

- After the Riot at Newport (RCA Victor, 1960)

Mack Avenue Superband

- Live from the Detroit Jazz Festival – 2013 (Mack Avenue, 2014) – live rec. 2013

=== As sideman ===
With Thomas Clausen

- Café Noir (Intermusic, 1991)
- Flowers and Trees (MA Music, 1992)

With Hank Garland

- Jazz Winds from a New Direction (Columbia, 1961) – also released as Hank Garland & Gary Burton's Three-Four The Blues (CBS, 1961)
- The Unforgettable Guitar of Hank Garland (Columbia, 1962)

With Stan Getz

- Getz Au Go Go (Verve, 1964) – live
- Getz/Gilberto No. 2 (Verve, 1966) – live rec. 1964
- The Stan Getz Quartet in Paris (Verve, 1967) – live rec. 1966
- The Canadian Concert of Stan Getz (Can-Am, 1983) – rec. 1965
- Nobody Else But Me (Verve, 1994) – rec. 1964

With George Shearing

- Jazz Concert (Capitol, 1963) – live
- Out of the Woods (Capitol, 1965) – rec. 1964
- Rare Form! (Capitol, 1966) – live rec. 1963

With Eberhard Weber

- Fluid Rustle (ECM, 1979)
- Hommage à Eberhard Weber (ECM, 2015) – live

With others

- Chet Atkins, After the Riot at Newport with the Nashville Allstars (RCA, 1960) – live
- Bob Brookmeyer, Bob Brookmeyer and Friends (Columbia, 1965)
- Eric Clapton, Journeyman (Reprise, 1989)
- Bruce Cockburn, The Charity of Night (True North, 1996)
- Floyd Cramer, Last Date (RCA Victor, 1960)
- Eddie Daniels, Benny Rides Again (GRP, 1992)
- Tim Hardin, Tim Hardin 1 (Verve, 1966)
- Howard Jones, One to One (Elektra, 1986)
- Quincy Jones, Quincy Jones Explores the Music of Henry Mancini (Mercury, 1964)
- k.d. lang, Ingénue (Sire, 1992)
- Livingston Taylor, There You Are Again (Coconut Bay, 2006)
- Jay Leonhart, Four Duke (Absolute Spain, 1995)
- Arif Mardin, Journey (Atlantic, 1974)
- Steve Swallow, Swallow (Xtra Watt, 1992)
- Jon Weber, Simple Complex (2nd Century Jazz, 2004)

== Grammy Awards ==
Year	Nominee / work	Award	Result
1972	Alone at Last	Grammy Award for Best Jazz Performance by a Soloist	Won
1979	Duet (with Chick Corea)	Grammy Award for Best Jazz Instrumental Album, Individual or Group	Won
1982	In Concert, Zürich, October 28, 1979 (with Chick Corea)	Grammy Award for Best Jazz Instrumental Album, Individual or Group	Won
1998	"Rhumbata", Native Sense (with Chick Corea)	Grammy Award for Best Jazz Instrumental Solo	Won
2000	Like Minds (with Chick Corea, Pat Metheny, Roy Haynes and Dave Holland)	Grammy Award for Best Jazz Instrumental Album, Individual or Group	Won
2009	The New Crystal Silence (with Chick Corea)	Grammy Award for Best Jazz Instrumental Performance	Won
2012	Hot House (with Chick Corea)	Grammy Award for Best Improvised Jazz Solo	Won

== See also ==
- Vibraphone
- List of vibraphonists
