= David Pritchard (musician) =

American musical artist (born 1949)

- Born: March 3, 1949 (age 77)
- Occupations: Guitarist, composer

David Pritchard (born March 3, 1949) is an American acoustic, classical, and jazz guitarist.

== Biography ==
Pritchard began studying classical guitar at the age of 12 but as a teenager his interest turned to jazz. As a high school student, he founded the jazz-rock group Quintet de Sade and at the age of 20 he joined the Gary Burton Quartet, replacing guitarist Jerry Hahn. In 1970, he co-founded, along with pianist/composer Pete Robinson, the jazz-fusion group Contraband. Several years followed where he freelanced in the Los Angeles area while also teaching at the Dick Grove School of Music. In 1978 he recorded his first album as a leader, Lightyear, followed a year later by City Dreams, featuring trumpeter Freddie Hubbard, pianist Patrice Rushen, drummer Chester Thompson, and bassist/producer Larry Klein.

In the late eighties, he changed his writing and playing style away from jazz and into a more classical and minimalist style, playing mainly acoustic and classical guitars. He also began writing music for multiple acoustic guitars and solo classical guitar, and formed a guitar trio to perform his music. His first all-acoustic recording was Air Patterns in 1988 and was subsequently signed by Zebra Records for his second acoustic album Unassigned Territory, which was produced by Denny Bruce and also featured singer Teri deSario. He has recorded four more acoustic albums of his original works on his own label, Morphic Resonance Music, the most recent being Evanescent.

As a composer, his classical guitar quartet Stairs has been recorded and performed by the Los Angeles Guitar Quartet and the Aquarelle Guitar Quartet. He has also written three books, one consisting of jazz fusion studies and the other two consisting of works for solo classical guitar.

== Discography ==
=== As a co-leader with pianist Pete Robinson ===
- Contraband, Time and Space (Epic Records, 1970)

=== As a leader ===
- Lightyear (Inner City, 1978)
- City Dreams (Inner City 1979)
- Air Patterns (Molecular Music, 1990)
- Unassigned Territory (Zebra 1999)
- Velocity (Morphic Resonance, 2003)
- Vertical Eden (Morphic Resonance, 2008)
- Metal Roads (Morphic Resonance, 2010)
- Among the Missing (Morphic Resonance, 2014)
- Evanescent (Morphic Resonance, 2019)

=== As a sideman ===
==== With Gary Burton ====
- Very Touchy (Joker 1978)

==== With Michael Gibbs Orchestra/Gary Burton Quartet ====
- Festival 69 (Turtle, 2018)

==== With David Axelrod ====
- Marchin’ (MCA, 1980)

=== As a composer ===
- Gary Burton Throb Records (Atlantic, 1969)
- Los Angeles Guitar Quartet Spin (Telarc, 2009)
- Aquarelle Guitar Quartet Aspects Chandos (2016)

=== Books ===
- Pritchard, David Music for the Contemporary Guitarist. (Belwin Mills Publ. Corp,1986).
- Pritchard, David Clockworks for Solo Guitar (Columbia Music/Theodore Presser Co.,1994)
- Pritchard David 6 Pieces for Guitar Solo (Mel Bay/Bill's Music Shelf, 2010), ISBN 978-078668225-6
