= Kari Ikonen =

- Born: 1973 (age 51–52); Korpilahti, Finland
- Occupation(s): Musician, composer
- Instrument(s): Piano, Moog, Rhodes, keyboards
- Years active: 1992–present
- Labels: Ozella Music, Fiasko Records, Eclipse, Texicalli
- Website: kariikonen.com

Kari Ikonen (born 1973) is a Finnish pianist, Moog player, and composer. He received the Yrjö-award from Jazz Finland in 2013, as the Finnish Jazz Musician of the Year.

After having studied piano with Matti Laukkanen for four years (1989–1993) at Jyväskylä Institute of Music, Ikonen continued his studies 1994 in piano and later in composition at the Jazz Music Department of Sibelius Academy, with such teachers as Jarmo Savolainen, Jukkis Uotila, Anders Jormin, Maria Schneider, Mike Gibbs, Sonny Heinilä and Olli Kortekangas. He also spent a semester in 1996 at the Rotterdam conservatorium, where he studied with Rob van Kreevelt. He got his master's degree from Sibelius Academy in 2001.

He led the band Karikko for close to 15 years and was active in bands such as Gnomus, Mia Simanainen's Ahava-band, Slo Motive and Markus Holkko Quartet. In addition to many small jazz groups, Ikonen has composed music to European Saxophone Ensemble, UMO Jazz Orchestra, The Guards Brass Septet, Jyväskylä Big Band, Tanguedia Quintet, Quinteto Otra Vez and Uusinta!-chamber orchestra.

Ikonen has worked with Louis Sclavis, Lee Konitz, Ingrid Jensen, Bob Moses, Stan Sultzman, Vincent Courtois, Mathias Eick, UMO, Juhani Aaltonen, Eero Koivistoinen, and Otto Donner.

Ikonen's playing and/or compositions can be heard on more than 40 records. Apart from playing and composing, Ikonen has worked as a teacher at Jyväskylä Institute of Music 1993–1994, Estonia Academy of Music and Theater 2007–2011 and Sibelius Academy since 1998.

He is active with Kari Ikonen Trio, Trio Toffa, Quartet Ajaton, Jeff Denson Trio and Orchestra Nazionale della Luna.

== Discography (selected) ==
=== As leader ===
Kari Ikonen Trio

- Wind, Frost & Radiation (Ozella Music 2018) (to be released in April 2018)
- AJMiLIVE #14 (AJMiLIVE 2016)
- Beauteous Tales And Offbeat Stories (Ozella Music 2015)
- Bright (Ozella Music 2013)

Kari Ikonen

- Impressions, Improvisations and Compositions (Ozella, 2021)
- Ikonostasis (Ozella, 2017)
- Karikko (Fiasko Records 2001)

Kari Ikonen & Karikko

- The Helsinki Suite (Eclipse Music 2011)
- Oceanophonic (Texicalli Records 2008)

=== Collaborations / As musician ===
Trio Toffa

- Positive (Eclipse Music 2016)

Quartet Ajaton

- Elixir (Ecplipse Music 2016)

Orchestra Nazionale della Luna

- Orchestra Nazionale Della Luna (Jazz Avatars 2017)

Ahava

- Ahava (Fiasko Records 2001)

Slo Motive

- Arrival (Eclipse Music 2012)

Gnomus

- Gnomus Diagnosis (Fiasko Records 2007) Jazz-Emma-nominé!
- Gnomus: 28 Août 2005 (Fiasko Records 2005)
- Gnomus II (Fiasko Records 2004)
- Gnomus (Fiasko Records 2000)

Lang & Luolajan-Mikkola

- Transit (RockAdillo 2005)

Markus Holkko

- Markus Holkko: From Circuits With Love (Texicalli 2010)
- Markus Holkko Quartet: Being Here (Jupiter 2007) Jazz-Emma-prize!

Mr Fonebone

- Hit and Run (Texicalli 2007)
- Mr Fonebone live featuring Ingrid Jensen (Texicalli 2001)
- Mr Fonebone (Antti Rissanen 1997)

Otto Donner

- Otto Donner Free For All: Live at the Five Corners (TUM 2010)

Quartet Coyote

- TRJVK + voc. (Texicalli 2004)
- Moisturizing (Texicalli 2000)

=== Recorded compositions ===
UMO Jazz Orchestra

- Umo on Umo (UMO 2008)
- Sauna Palaa (UMO 2005)

Quinteto ¡Otra Vez! & La Nueva Orquesta de Cuerdas

- Quinteto ¡Otra Vez! & La Nueva Orquesta de Cuerdas (Otra Vez 2005)

== Awards, grants and residencies ==
Awards and honors

- 2000 First prize at Jazz Composers Alliance/Julius Hemphill Composition Awards, USA
- 2001 Jazz-Emma (Finland's Grammy) for the best jazz album of 2001
- 2002 First prize at the "Scrivere in Jazz" composition contest in Sassari, Italy
- 2012 Nominated for the Teosto Award for the compositions of the album The Helsinki Suite
- 2013 The Yrjö Award as the Finnish Jazz Musician of the Year 2013

Grants

- 2011 1.5-year artist grant from the Arts Council of Finland
- 2014 1-year artist grant from the Kone Foundation
- 2017 5-year artist grant from the Arts Promotion Centre Finland

Numerous smaller grants from Finnish Culture Foundation, The Finnish Arts Council, MES, ESEK, LUSES, Georg Malmstén Foundation and others.

Artist residencies

- 2004, 2015 and 2018 at the Cité internationale des arts in Paris
- 2005 Villa Karo in Benin
- 2006 Hot Clube de Portugal/Pepiniérès pour Jeunes Artistes in Lisbon
- 2011 ACSL in Yerevan, Armenia
- 2012 Circolo Scandinavo in Rome
