= Laszlo Gardony =

Hungarian-American jazz pianist and composer

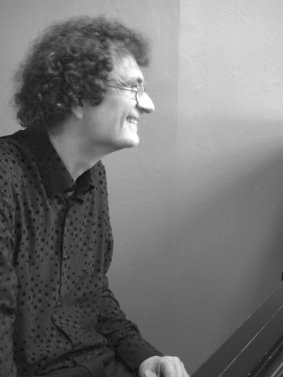

Background information
- Born: 1956 (age 69–70); Hungary
- Genre: Jazz
- Occupation: Musician
- Instrument: Piano
- Years active: 1980s–present
- Labels: Antilles, Sunnyside
- Website: www.lgjazz.com

Laszlo Gardony (born 1956) is a Hungarian-born American jazz pianist and composer. Gardony performs as a solo artist and leads his own trio, quartet and sextet. He is also a featured sideman with several other groups.

== Biography ==
Gardony studied at the Béla Bartók Conservatory in Budapest, graduating in 1979. He also holds a Masters of Education in Mathematics and Physics from Eötvös Loránd University.

In 1983 he moved to the United States on a scholarship to study at Berklee College of Music in Boston. He was the first student in the school's history to be offered a teaching position upon graduation. He has been a full Professor of Piano at Berklee for nearly two decades.

While still a student at Berklee, he formed the group Forward Motion with Tommy Smith, Terje Gewelt and Ian Froman. He soon formed his first trio with Froman and Miroslav Vitous with whom he recorded The Secret for Antilles Records. His second album, The Legend of Tsumi (Antilles) featured Dave Holland and Bob Moses.

In 1987, he won first prize at the Great American Jazz Piano Competition. Since 1987 he has been on the faculty at Berklee where he is Professor of Piano. In 2023, Gardony was invited to join the National Academy of Recording Arts and Sciences/GRAMMYs as a Voting Member.

Gardony's first album for Sunnyside Records was a critically acclaimed solo piano disc, Changing Standards. His next album, Breakout (Avenue Jazz Records), was released in 1994 and featured Mick Goodrick on guitar as well as George Jinda (talking drum; udu), Satoshi Takeishi (taiko drums) and Stomu Takeishi (electric bass).

Gardony returned to Sunnyside in 2001 with a trio recording, Behind Open Doors which featured Jamey Haddad and John Lockwood. Subsequently, Gardony has recorded four albums with bassist John Lockwood and drummer Yoron Israel, his working trio of nine years: Ever Before Ever After (Sunnyside) in 2003, Natural Instinct (Sunnyside) in 2006, Dig Deep (Sunnyside) in 2008 and Signature Time (Sunnyside) in 2011 Signature Time also features multi-instrumentalist, vocalist, Stan Strickland on a few tracks as well as drummer Yoron Israel on the vibraphone. His 2013 recording is a solo piano album, Clarity (Sunnyside) In 2015 Gardony released a live sextet album, Life in Real Time (Sunnyside) with Bill Pierce, Don Braden, Stan Strickland, Yoron Israel and John Lockwood. The album was named by the Boston Globe as one of the 10 best jazz albums of 2015 His 2017 release - also on Sunnyside - is a solo piano disc titled Serious Play In 2019 he released another solo piano album, "La Marseillaise" (Sunnyside). Then in 2022 Gardony recorded a critically acclaimed trio album "Close Connection" (Sunnyside) which was released in December, 2022

Among other projects, he has also been involved in violinist Matt Glaser's group, The Wayfaring Strangers, a fusion of bluegrass and jazz. Gardony has performed with the Wayfaring Strangers at numerous venues and festivals, including Symphony Hall with the Boston Pops, with the Utah Symphony in Salt Lake City, and at Merlefest in North Carolina. Gardony has also performed with David "Fathead" Newman at several festivals, and with Eddie Gomez's Per Sempre Quintet. Both Randy Brecker and Dave Liebman have performed as guest soloists with Gardony's group. Gardony is featured on two Yoron Israel & High Standards albums: Visions – The Music of Stevie Wonder (Ronja, 2012) and This Moment (Ronja, 2015). He is also a featured soloist on New York-based flutist Christian Artmann's 2018 CD, "Our Story" (Sunnyside) and on his 2023 album, "The Middle of Life" (Sunnyside). Gardony's composition, "Meeting You There" was featured on Chihiro Yamanaka's Blue Note album, "Guilty Pleasure".

== Critical reception ==
Gardony has been praised for his "fluid pianism" in The New York Times and for his "uniformly high quality of compositions", harmonic complexity and emotional content which All About Jazz found to be comparable with Bill Evans'. The Jazz Review described him as "a pianist worthy of praise within the highest pantheon of performers". Dave Brubeck called Gardony a "great pianist".

== Discography ==
Year recorded	Title	Label	Personnel
1988	The Secret	Antilles	Trio, with Miroslav Vitous (bass), Ian Froman (drums)
1989	The Legend of Tsumi	Antilles	Trio, with Dave Holland (bass), Bob Moses (drums)
1993	Changing Standards	Sunnyside	Solo piano
1994	Breakout	Avenue	With Mick Goodrick (guitar), Stomu Takeishi (bass), George Jinda and Satoshi Takeishi (drums, percussion)
2001	Behind Open Doors	Sunnyside	Trio, with Jamey Haddad (drums), John Lockwood (bass)
2003	Ever Before Ever After	Sunnyside	Trio, with John Lockwood (bass), Yoron Israel (drums); in concert
2006	Natural Instinct	Sunnyside	Trio, with John Lockwood (bass), Yoron Israel (drums)
2008	Dig Deep	Sunnyside	Trio, with John Lockwood (bass), Yoron Israel (drums)
2011	Signature Time	Sunnyside	Quartet, with John Lockwood (bass), Yoron Israel (drums, vibraharp), Stan Strickland (tenor sax, vocals)
2013	Clarity	Sunnyside	Solo piano
2015	Life in Real Time	Sunnyside	Sextet, with Stan Strickland, Don Braden and Billy Pierce (sax), John Lockwood (bass), Yoron Israel (drums)
2017	Serious Play	Sunnyside	Solo piano
2019	La Marseillaise	Sunnyside	Solo piano
2022	Close Connection	Sunnyside	Trio with John Lockwood and Yoron Israel
