= Sweet Earth Flying =

Studio album by Marion Brown
- Released: 1974
- Recorded: May 6 & 7, 1974; Intermedia Sound Studios, Boston
- Genre: Jazz
- Length: 38:52
- Label: Impulse! AS 9275
- Producer: Ed Michel

Marion Brown chronology
Geechee Recollections (1973)	Sweet Earth Flying (1974)	Vista (1975)

Sweet Earth Flying is an album by American jazz saxophonist Marion Brown recorded in 1974 and released on the Impulse! label. Along with Afternoon of a Georgia Faun and Geechee Recollections, it was one of Brown's albums dedicated to the US state of Georgia.

== Reception ==
Professional ratings
Review scores
Source	Rating
Allmusic	4.5/5 stars
Tom Hull – on the Web	B+

The Allmusic review by Brian Olewnick awarded the album 4 1/2 stars stating "Sweet Earth Flying is arguably Marion Brown's finest work and certainly one of the underappreciated treasures of '70s jazz... Very highly recommended to open-eared jazz fans of all tastes".

== Track listing ==
All compositions by Marion Brown except as indicated

1. "Sweet Earth Flying Part 1" - 3:38
2. "Sweet Earth Flying Part 3" - 5:55
3. "Sweet Earth Flying Part 4: Prince Willie" (Brown, Bill Hasson) - 5:55
4. "Sweet Earth Flying Part 5" - 5:06
5. "Eleven Light City Part 1" - 7:16
6. "Eleven Light City Part 2" - 2:08
7. "Eleven Light City Part 3" - 5:50
8. "Eleven Light City Part 4" - 3:04

== Personnel ==
- Marion Brown — alto saxophone, soprano saxophone
- Muhal Richard Abrams (tracks 2–8), Paul Bley (tracks 1, 2, 5–8) — piano, electric piano, organ
- James Jefferson — bass, electric bass
- Steve McCall — drums, percussion
- Bill Hasson — percussion, narration
