= Pius Cheung =

Chinese-Canadian percussionist

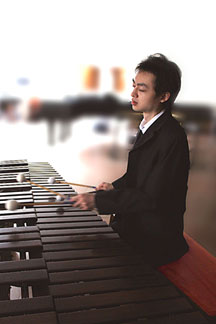
Pius Cheung

Pius Cheung (Chinese: 張鈞量) is a percussionist, pianist, composer and educator, called "a young Chinese-Canadian virtuoso," by The New York Times. Born in China, he moved to British Columbia at age twelve. He received his bachelor's degree from the Curtis Institute of Music in Philadelphia and his doctorate from the University of Michigan. He is currently an associate professor of percussion at the University of Oregon.
