= Paul Pena =

American singer-songwriter (1950-2005)

Background information
- Born: January 26, 1950; Hyannis, Massachusetts, U.S.
- Died: October 1, 2005 (aged 55) San Francisco, California, U.S.
- Genres: Rock; blues rock; psychedelic rock; Tuvan throat singing
- Occupations: Musician; songwriter
- Instruments: Guitar; vocals
- Years active: 1960s–1974; 1995–2005
- Labels: Capitol; Hybrid
- Spouse: Babe (died 1991)
- Website: paulpena.com

Paul Pena (/piːnə/ PEE-na; January 26, 1950 – October 1, 2005) was an American singer, songwriter and guitarist.

Pena's music from the first half of his career touched on Delta blues, jazz, morna, flamenco, folk, and rock and roll. Pena is probably best known for writing the song "Jet Airliner," a major 1977 hit for the Steve Miller Band and a staple of classic rock radio; and for appearing in the 1999 documentary film Genghis Blues, wherein he displayed his abilities in the field of Tuvan throat singing.

== Early years ==
Pena was born in Hyannis, Massachusetts, to Jack and Virginia Pena. He was of Cape Verdean descent. Pena was born with congenital glaucoma, and was almost completely blind since birth. From the age of five, he attended the Perkins School for the Blind in Watertown, Massachusetts, graduating in 1967. He then attended Clark University in Worcester, Massachusetts.

== Career ==
=== Early career ===
In February 1969, Pena's band played at the Electric Factory in Philadelphia, Pennsylvania, opening twice for both Frank Zappa and the Mothers of Invention and the Grateful Dead. Later that year, he performed at the Newport Folk Festival.

After moving to San Francisco in 1971, Pena opened for Jerry Garcia and Merl Saunders at the Keystone in Berkeley and other area clubs many times over the course of the next three years. Pena said of Keystone owner Freddie Herrera, "His idea of an audition was for me to come and open up for Garcia and Saunders. That went on for some time. Whenever he would have somebody, not knowing who would open, he would call me."

Pena's debut album was the self-titled Paul Pena, released in 1972 to critical acclaim but little commercial success. His second and final album, New Train, was recorded in 1973 but did not see release until 2000, owing to creative and business disputes with Albert Grossman, head of Bearsville Records, who considered the record unmarketable. "Paul was devastated," said Gunther Weil, his manager. "It was essentially the end of Paul's career." Steve Miller heard the unreleased album and covered "Jet Airliner" on his 1977 album Book of Dreams. The song was a top 10 hit, and the royalties earned from this cover version helped support Pena for the rest of his life.

New Train was finally released in 2000 to critical acclaim, with Rolling Stone writing that "Pena's guitar blends icepick class with the rainblow blues of Jimi Hendrix." Pena toured in support of the album, including an appearance on Late Night with Conan O'Brien, where he played "Jet Airliner."

=== Throat singing ===
While listening to shortwave radio in 1984, Pena heard Tuvan throat singing on a Radio Moscow broadcast. He also heard Jill Purce, one of the pioneers of overtone chanting in the West. Seven years later he found a copy of Tuva: Voices from the Center of Asia in a record store and listened to it continuously. Based on that record and extended experimentation, he was able to teach himself the vocal techniques called Khoomei, Sygyt, and Kargyraa, saying:

After playing the CD continuously for several months and driving many of my friends away by making weird noises while experimenting with my voice, I finally learned a few of the basic techniques of this fascinating group of vocal styles by remembering the styles of some of the blues greats of the past—especially Charlie Patton, Tommy McClennan, and Chester "Howlin' Wolf" Burnett.

Pena attended a performance of Tuvan throat singing at the Asian Art Museum of San Francisco on February 6, 1993. He performed an impromptu Tuvan song in the kargyraa style, which impressed famous Tuvan throatsinger Kongar-ol Ondar. Tuvans affectionately call him "Cher Shimjer" ("earthquake") because of the deepness of his voice. Pena said, "My voice is lower than most Tuvans. They have a style that makes your voice lower. When I use that, there's a slow song when I hit a note that's four white keys from the left of the piano."

The 1999 film Genghis Blues documented Pena's journey to Tuva. It won the 1999 Sundance Film Festival Audience Award for a Documentary, and was nominated for an Academy Award in 2000 in the Documentary Feature category.

== Personal life and death ==
Pena's wife Babe died in 1991 of kidney failure. Pena was in poor health in the years leading up to his death, and died at his San Francisco apartment at the age of 55 on October 1, 2005, from complications from diabetes and pancreatitis.

== Discography ==
- Paul Pena (Capitol, 1972)
- New Train (Hybrid, 2000)
