= Duster (Gary Burton album) =

Studio album by Gary Burton Quartet
- Released: 1967
- Recorded: April 18–20, 1967
- Studio: RCA Victor Studio B, New York City
- Genre: Jazz fusion
- Length: 33:01
- Label: RCA
- Producer: Brad McCuen

Gary Burton chronology
Tennessee Firebird (1967)	Duster (1967)	Lofty Fake Anagram (1967)

Duster is an album by vibraphonist Gary Burton, recorded in 1967 and released by RCA. It features Burton with electric guitarist Larry Coryell, bassist Steve Swallow and drummer Roy Haynes.

Duster is considered one of the first jazz fusion albums. It peaked at number 15 on Billboard's Top Jazz Albums.

== Reception ==
Professional ratings
Review scores
Source	Rating
AllMusic	4/5 stars
DownBeat	5/5 stars
MusicHound Jazz	3.5/5 stars
The Penguin Guide to Jazz Recordings	4/4 stars

The AllMusic review by Scott Yanow described it as "one of the first fusion records", also stating: "Although Burton's basic sound had not changed from the previous year, his openness toward other styles made his Quartet one of the most significant jazz groups of the period".

== Track listing ==
All compositions by Mike Gibbs except where indicated.

1. "Ballet" – 4:54
2. "Sweet Rain" – 4:24
3. "Portsmouth Figurations" (Steve Swallow) – 3:03
4. "General Mojo's Well Laid Plan" (Swallow) – 4:58
5. "One, Two, 1-2-3-4" (Gary Burton, Larry Coryell) – 5:56
6. "Sing Me Softly of the Blues" (Carla Bley) – 4:05
7. "Liturgy" – 3:26
8. "Response" (Burton) – 2:15

== Personnel ==
Musicians

- Gary Burton – vibraphone
- Larry Coryell – guitar
- Steve Swallow – double bass
- Roy Haynes – drums

Production

- Donald Elfman – liner notes, reissue producer
- Ray Hall – engineer
- Brad McCuen – producer
- Thomas Molesky – cover design
- Tom Zimmerman – photography
- Mike Zwerin – liner notes

== Chart history ==
Chart (1969)	Peak position
U.S. Billboard Top Jazz Albums	15
