= Jerry Hahn =

American jazz guitarist

- Born: September 21, 1940 (age 84); Alma, Nebraska, U.S.
- Genres: Jazz
- Occupation: Musician
- Instrument: Guitar

Jerry Hahn (born September 21, 1940, Alma, Nebraska) is an American jazz guitarist.

Hahn studied at Wichita State University, then moved to San Francisco in 1962, where he played with John Handy (1964–66). He toured with the 5th Dimension in 1968 and worked with Gary Burton from 1968 to 1969. In addition to recording his own album in 1967, he led the Jerry Hahn Brotherhood, a country-blues jazz-rock ensemble, in 1970. In 1972, Hahn appeared as a session musician on "Run That Body Down" and "Armistice Day", two tracks from Paul Simon, the singer-songwriter's eponymous solo album. Later in the decade he became a teacher at Wichita State and performed less until 1986, when he moved to Portland, Oregon. He played locally and taught at Portland State University. The Jerry Hahn Method for Jazz Guitar was published by Mel Bay Publications in 2003.

== Discography ==
- Ara-Be-In (Changes, 1967)
- The Jerry Hahn Brotherhood (Columbia, 1970)
- Moses (Fantasy, 1973)
- Jerry Hahn & His Quintet (reissue of Ara-Be-In, Arhoolie, 1975)
- Time Changes (Enja, 1995)
- Hahn Solo (Migration, 2006)
- Jazz Hymns (Migration, 2009)
- Hahn Songs (Self-released, 2010)

With Gary Burton

- Country Roads & Other Places (RCA, 1969)
- Throb (Atlantic, 1969)
- Good Vibes (Atlantic, 1969)

With John Handy

- Recorded Live at the Monterey Jazz Festival (Columbia, 1966)
- The 2nd John Handy Album (Columbia, 1966)
