= Bob Moses (musician) =

American jazz drummer (born 1948)

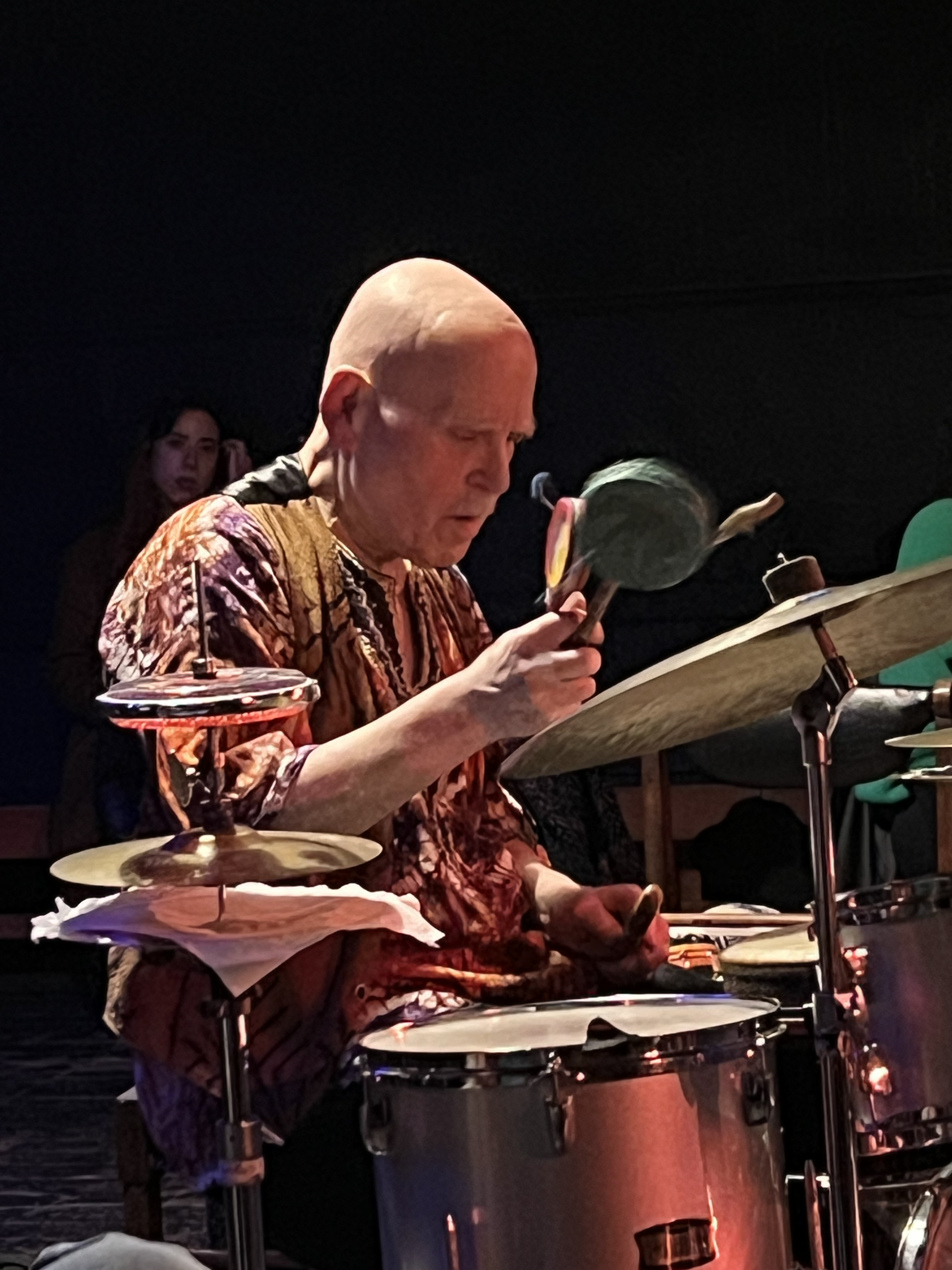

Background information
- Also known as: Ra-Kalam Bob Moses
- Born: Robert Laurence Moses; January 28, 1948 (age 78); New York City, U.S.
- Genres: Jazz, avant-garde jazz
- Occupations: Musician, composer, bandleader
- Instruments: Drums, percussion
- Years active: 1964–present
- Label: Gramavision
- Formerly of: The Free Spirits, Gary Burton bands, Michael Gibbs Big Band, Steve Kuhn bands

Robert Laurence Moses (born January 28, 1948) is an American jazz drummer.

== Biography ==
He was born in New York City. Moses played with Roland Kirk in 1964–65 while he was still a teenager. In 1966, he and Larry Coryell formed The Free Spirits, a jazz fusion ensemble, and from 1967 to 1969 he played in Gary Burton's quartet, including drumming for the Grammy-nominated album Gary Burton Quartet in Concert. He played on the landmark 1967 Burton album A Genuine Tong Funeral, but due to creative disputes with the album's composer Carla Bley, he was credited as "Lonesome Dragon". Moses and Bley would later reconcile and he became a vocal booster for her music.

Moses recorded with Burton in the 1970s, in addition to work with Dave Liebman/Open Sky, Pat Metheny, Mike Gibbs, Hal Galper, Gil Goldstein, Steve Swallow, Steve Kuhn/Sheila Jordan (from 1979 to 1982), George Gruntz, and Emily Remler (from 1983 to 1984). In the early 1970s he was a member of Compost with Harold Vick, Jumma Santos, Jack Gregg and Jack DeJohnette.

His first release as a leader was 1968's Love Animal. His second release was 1973's Bittersuite in the Ozone. His records for Gramavision in the 1980s were critically acclaimed.

He is the author of the drum method book Drum Wisdom, published in 1984.

Moses performs alongside John Lockwood, Damon Smith, Jaap Blonk, Don Pate, and John Medeski with guitarist Tisziji Muñoz and teaches at New England Conservatory.

In 2022, he recorded a trio album with the Norwegian bassist Arild Andersen and Slovenian guitarist Samo Šalamon entitled Pure and Simple, after Šalamon had an extensive interview with him.

== Discography ==
=== As leader ===
- Bittersuite in the Ozone (Mozown, 1975)
- Tributaries with Richard Sussman, Andy LaVerne (Inner City, 1979)
- Family (Sutra, 1980)
- When Elephants Dream of Music (Gramavision, 1983)
- Visit with the Great Spirit (Gramavision, 1984)
- The Story of Moses (Gramavision, 1987)
- Drumming Birds with Billy Martin (ITM, 1987)
- Wheels of Colored Light (Open Minds, 1992)
- Time Stood Still (Gramavision, 1994)
- Devotion (Soul Note, 1996)
- Love Everlasting with Tisziji Muñoz (Amulet, 1999)
- Nishoma (Grapeshot, 2000)
- Love Animal (Amulet, 2003)
- Meditation on Grace with Michel Lambert (FMR, 2008)
- Father's Day B'hash (Sunnyside, 2009)
- The Illuminated Heart (Ra-Kalam, 2012)
- Ecstatic Weanderings with Greg Burk (Jazzwerkstatt, 2012)
- Ultra Minor with Jon Catler (FreeNote, 2018)

With The Free Spirits

- Out of Sight and Sound (ABC, 1967)
- Live at the Scene, February 22nd 1967 (Sunbeam, 2011)

With Compost

- Take Off Your Body (Columbia, 1971)
- Life Is Round (Columbia, 1973)

With Open Sky
(Trio with Dave Liebman and Frank Tusa)

- Open Sky (PM, 1973) – rec. 1972
- Spirit in the Sky (PM, 1975)

=== As sideman ===
With Gary Burton

- Lofty Fake Anagram (RCA, 1967)
- A Genuine Tong Funeral (RCA, 1968)
- Gary Burton Quartet in Concert (RCA, 1968)
- Ring (ECM, 1974)
- Dreams So Real (ECM, 1976)

With Michael Gibbs

- In the Public Interest (Polydor, 1974)
- Directs the Only Chrome-Waterfall Orchestra (Bronze, 1975)
- Big Music (Venture, 1988)
- By the Way (Ah Um, 1993)

With Steve Kuhn

- Motility (ECM, 1977)
- Non-Fiction (ECM, 1978)
- Playground (ECM, 1980)
- Last Year's Waltz (ECM, 1982)

With Dave Liebman

- Drum Ode (ECM, 1975)
- Homage to John Coltrane (Owl, 1987)
- Spirit Renewed (Owl, 1991)

With Steve Marcus

- Tomorrow Never Knows (Vortex, 1968)
- Count's Rock Band (Vortex, 1969)
- The Lord's Prayer (Vortex, 1969)

With Tisziji Muñoz

- The Paradox of Independence (Anami Music, 2014)
- When Coltrane Calls! Session 3: Living Immortality (Anami Music, 2015)
- Scream of Ensoundment (Anami Music, 2017)

With others (listed chronologically)

- Roland Kirk, I Talk with the Spirits (Limelight, 1965)
- Larry Coryell, Lady Coryell (Vanguard, 1968)
- Danny Kalb, Crosscurrents (Cotillion, 1969)
- Terumasa Hino, Hino's Journey to Air (Love, 1970)
- Todd Rundgren, Runt (Ampex, 1970)
- Paul Bley, The Paul Bley Synthesizer Show (Milestone, 1971)
- Gunter Hampel, Ballet-Symphony No 5, Symphony No. 6. The Music of Gunter Hampel (Birth1971)
- Pat Metheny, Bright Size Life (ECM, 1976)
- David Friesen, Waterfall Rainbow (Inner City, 1977)
- Gil Goldstein, Pure as Rain (Chiaroscuro, 1977)
- Roland Kirk, Kirk's Work (Mercury, 1977)
- Ernie Krivda, Satanic (Inner City, 1977)
- Ernie Krivda, The Alchemist (Inner City, 1978)
- Franco Ambrosetti, Close Encounter (Enja, 1978)
- Hal Galper, Speak with a Single Voice (Century, 1979)
- Steve Swallow, Home (ECM, 1980)
- Aki Takase, ABC (Union Jazz, 1982)
- George Gruntz, Theatre (ECM, 1984)
- Emily Remler, Transitions (Concord Jazz, 1984)
- Emily Remler, Catwalk (Concord Jazz, 1985)
- Tony Dagradi, Sweet Remembrance (Gramavision, 1987)
- George Gruntz, Happening Now! (hat ART, 1988)
- Torsten de Winkel, Torsten de Winkel Acoustic Quartet (Hot Wire, 1991)
- Hal Galper, Redux '78 (Concord Jazz, 1991)
- Torsten de Winkel, Tribute: Talking to the Spirits (Hot Wire, 1993)
- Kustomized, The Battle for Space (Matador, 1995)
- Paul Bley, Circles (Milestone, 2004)
- Brian Landrus, Forward (Cadence, 2009)
- Darius Jones, Man'ish Boy (A Raw & Beautiful Thing) (AUM Fidelity, 2009)
- Brian Landrus, Everlasting (CIMP, 2011)
- Kari Ikonen, Ikonostasis (Ozella, 2017)
- Bukky Leo, Spaceships over Africa (Ra Kalam, 2017)
- Vinny Golia & Henry Kaiser, Astral Plane Crash (Balance Point, 2018)
- Burton Greene, Damon Smith, Life's Intense Mystery (Astral Spirits/Monofonus, 2019)
- Henry Kaiser, More Requia (Metalanguage, 2019)
- Samo Salamon, Arild Andersen & Ra Kalam Bob Moses, Pure and Simple (Samo, 2022)
- Kyle Quass and Damon Smith, The Harmony of Things as They Are, (off-label, 2023)
- Samo Salamon, Vasil Hadžimanov & Ra Kalam Bob Moses, Dances of Freedom (Samo, 2024)
- Samo Salamon & Ra Kalam Bob Moses, Dream Suites Vol. 1 (Samo, 2025)
