= Pekka Ikonen =

Finnish politician

Pietari (Pekka) Ikonen (18 July 1877, in Jääski – 13 September 1956) was a Finnish farmer, bank director and politician. He was a member of the Parliament of Finland from 1914 to 1916, representing the Finnish Party.
