= Tennessee Firebird =

Studio album by Gary Burton
- Released: 1967
- Recorded: September 19–21, 1966
- Genre: Jazz
- Length: 35:15
- Label: RCA
- Producer: Brad McCuen, Chet Atkins

Gary Burton chronology
| The Time Machine (1966) | Tennessee Firebird (1967) | Duster (1967) |

Tennessee Firebird is an album by vibraphonist Gary Burton, recorded in 1966 and released on the RCA label in 1967. The session featured both jazz and country musicians, including guitarist Chet Atkins, saxophonist Steve Marcus, fiddler Buddy Spicher, harmonica player Charlie McCoy and drummer Roy Haynes.

== Reception ==
The AllMusic review by Ron Wynn stated: "While the concept of 'jazz-rock' was in its embryonic stages, Burton was experimenting with a style combining jazz improvisation with rock energy and rhythms. This 1967 session added another ingredient to the musical mix: country and bluegrass sensibility".

Professional ratings
Review scores
| Source | Rating |
|---|---|
| AllMusic | 3/5 stars |
| The Penguin Guide to Jazz Recordings | 3/4 stars |

== Track listing ==
All compositions by Gary Burton, except as indicated

1. "Gone" (Smokey Rogers) - 4:52
2. "Tennessee Firebird" - 2:57
3. "Just Like a Woman" (Bob Dylan) - 3:48
4. "Black Is the Color of My True Love's Hair" (Traditional) - 1:53
5. "Faded Love" (Bob Wills, John Wills, Billy Jack Wills) - 3:22
6. "Panhandle Rag" (Leon McAuliffe) - 1:33 Bonus track on CD reissue
7. "I Can't Help It (If I'm Still in Love With You)" (Hank Williams) - 2:54
8. "I Want You" (Dylan) - 3:28
9. "Alone and Forsaken" (Williams) - 2:49
10. "Walter L." - 4:41
11. "Born to Lose" (Ted Daffan) - 2:43
12. "Beauty Contest" - 1:25
13. "Epilogue" - 0:23

- Recorded at RCA Victor´s "Nashville Sound" Studio in Nashville, Tennessee, on September 19–21, 1966.

== Personnel ==
- Gary Burton – vibraphone, piano, organ
- Steve Marcus – soprano saxophone, tenor saxophone
- Buddy Emmons – steel guitar
- Sonny Osborne – banjo
- Buddy Spicher – fiddle
- Chet Atkins, Jimmy Colvard, Ray Edenton – guitar
- Charlie McCoy – harmonica
- Bobby Osborne – mandolin
- Henry Strzelecki, Steve Swallow – bass
- Kenneth Buttrey, Roy Haynes – drums
