= Juma Santos =

American musician

- Also known as: Juma Santos
- Born: James Reginald Riley; December 27, 1948; Massachusetts, United States
- Died: September 1, 2007 (aged 59)
- Genres: African; Caribbean; jazz; fusion; R&B
- Occupation: Percussionist
- Instruments: Percussion, drums

Juma Santos, also known as Jumma Santos (born James R. Riley, December 27, 1948 – September 1, 2007) was a percussionist known for his extensive work over four decades with African music, Caribbean music, jazz, fusion and R&B artists recognizes as a master drummer.

He combined and fused styles and playing techniques of various African musical instruments, experimenting with rhythms, songs, and chants with modern jazz harmonies and melodic forms and structures. His career included performing with many noted artists on projects of historical significance, including recording on more than 75 albums.

Santos recorded on Miles Davis's Bitches Brew and toured with Davis for a year, credited as "Jim Riley". He also toured and recorded with Nina Simone, David Sanborn and Taj Mahal. Other performance residencies include stints with Ahmad Jamal, Dave Liebman, Pee Wee Ellis, Jack DeJohnette, Gato Garcia, Don Alias, Freddie Hubbard, the Fabulous Rhinestones, Harvey Brooks, Roy Ayers, Don Moye, and his own groups, Rosewater Foundation, Afro Jazz Messengers, the Pan-African Drum Ensemble, the Jumma Society and Sounds of the Urban Forest. Juma can be seen performing with Nina Simone in the academy award-winning documentary Summer of Soul.

He taught a generation of aspiring Afro-Cuban percussionists in NYC in the 1990s (at the Fareta School of African Dance and Drum) and in Detroit in the 2000s.

Juma Santos was also a fine photographer/painter who had had several successful exhibitions.

He died in September 2007, in Chicago, apparently of complications from malaria, at the age of 59 and mainly because his religious beliefs did not allow him to use traditional Western medicine when he became ill.

== Discography ==
=== As sideman ===
- 1969: Bitches Brew, Miles Davis
- 1969: Black Gold, Nina Simone
- 1971: Ubiquity, Roy Ayers
- 1971: Paul Pena, Paul Pena
- 1971: Compost, Compost
- 1972: He's Coming, Roy Ayers
- 1973: Life is Round, Compost
- 1973: Geechee Recollections, Marion Brown
- 1973: Lawrence of Newark, Larry Young
- 1973: Andy Pratt, Andy Pratt
- 1973: Live at Berkeley, Nina Simone
- 1976: Light'n Up, Please!, Dave Liebman
- 1976: David Sanborn, David Sanborn
- 1977: Beyond the Rain, Chico Freeman
- 1979: The Love Connection, Freddie Hubbard
- 1984: Georgia Blue, Julius Arthur Hemphill and the JAH Band, [Minor Music 1984]
- 1992: Family Portrait, Victor Lewis
- 2006: A Gift From Trane, Ghasem Batamuntu [Tahoe Records]
