= The Bitter Southerner =

Publication in Atlanta, Georgia, US

- Editor: Dave Whitling, Valerie Boyd, Josina Guess, Rachel Priest
- Categories: General Interest
- Frequency: Trianualy
- Circulation: 20,000
- Founded: August 13, 2013; 13 years ago as an online cite
- First issue: Spring 2021; 4 years ago
- Country: United States
- Based in: Atlanta, Georgia
- Language: English
- Website: bittersoutherner.com

The Bitter Southerner is a progressive magazine that was created on August 6, 2013, by Chuck Reece, Dave Whitling, Kyle Tibbs Jones, and Butler Raines. The first print edition came out in 2021. In 2015, Eric NeSmith joined the team and became Publisher of The Bitter Southerner. The publication is headquartered in Atlanta, Georgia. The website publishes feature length stories and photographic essays about an often-overlooked aspect of Southern culture: the progressive South. In addition to its magazine-style content, the organization also produces a podcast, compiles videos, and curates a folklore project. It has been described in the New York Times as a kind of "kitchen-sink New Yorker."

After one year of operations in 2014, The Bitter Southerner web page had an average of 50,000 unique visitors and 12,000 subscribers to its newsletter. In 2020, the Atlanta Journal-Constitution stated that The Bitter Southerner averages 138,000 pageviews a month from 90,000 unique visitors. In the same article, it was announced that Reece would be leaving the publication after 7 years. The publication describes its two major reader bases as Southerners who have since moved elsewhere and non-Southerners who have moved to the South. The publication has been supported by prominent Southerners like Patterson Hood of the Drive-By Truckers, singer-songwriter Rosanne Cash, and chef Hugh Acheson.

For his work with The Bitter Southerner, TIME Magazine named Chuck Reece as one of their 31 people changing the South in 2018. In this article, Reece describes a "Bitter Southerner," their reader base as "… somebody who loves this region but also is willing to acknowledge and not gloss over the many difficult pieces of its history."

"Really, what drove it more than anything else is seeing the media stereotypes. With most media, you get one of two versions of the South: You sort of get the polite tea party — and I don't mean that in the political sense — genteel, hospitable South, or you get the "redneck" stereotypes. You never get anything in between. That's what bothered us. We've got all the great stories in the middle. It feels like we tapped into something that was latent out there, which was that people in the South were hoping to find some kind of medium that would portray the good stuff in a smart way."
- Chuck Reece

== History ==
Reece and his co-founders launched The Bitter Southerner because they got "pissed off...Bitter as it were." It was partially the lack of inclusion of a single Southern drinking establishment on Drinks International's list of the Top 50 bars in the world that pushed them to launch the publication. The name -- "The Bitter Southerner"—reveals the original concept of a cocktail blog. Reece states that the title "[is] like a quadruple entendre."

In the spring of 2021, during a membership drive, The Bitter Southerner launched a triennial print magazine with stories, poetry, and art from across the South.

In 2025 the magazine had a circulation of 20,000.

== Awards ==
- 2019 James Beard Award for Foodways Writing: Shane Mitchell, "A Hunger for Tomatoes"
- 2019 James Beard Award for Profile Writing: Michael Adno, "The Short and Brilliant Life of Ernest Matthew Mickler"
- 2018 James Beard Award / M.F.K. Fisher Distinguished Writing Award: Shane Mitchell, "Who Owns Uncle Ben?"
- 2016 James Beard Award for Profile Writing: Wendell Brock, "Christiane Lauterbach: The Woman Who Ate Atlanta"
