= Something's Coming! (album) =

Studio album by Gary Burton
- Released: 1964
- Recorded: August 14–16, 1963
- Studio: RCA Victor, New York City
- Genre: Jazz
- Length: 35:15
- Label: RCA
- Producer: George Avakian

Gary Burton chronology
3 in Jazz (1963)	Something's Coming! (1964)	The Groovy Sound of Music (1965)

Something's Coming! is an album by vibraphonist Gary Burton recorded in 1963 and released on the RCA label in 1964. This album features Burton playing with guitarist Jim Hall, bassist Chuck Israels and drummer Larry Bunker, three musicians associated with pianist Bill Evans.

== Reception ==
The Allmusic review by Scott Yanow stated: "Gary Burton's third full-length album as a leader finds him rapidly developing into a fresh new voice on the vibes".

Professional ratings
Review scores
Source	Rating
Allmusic	3/5 stars

== Track listing ==
1. "On Green Dolphin Street" (Bronisław Kaper, Ned Washington) - 4:04
2. "Melanie" (Michael Gibbs) - 3:51
3. "Careful" (Jim Hall) - 4:07
4. "Six Improvisatory Sketches" (Michael Gibbs) - 5:04
5. "Something's Coming" (Leonard Bernstein, Stephen Sondheim) - 6:10
6. "Little Girl Blue" (Richard Rodgers, Lorenz Hart) - 7:05
7. "Summertime" (DuBose Heyward, George Gershwin) - 4:54

- Recorded at RCA Victor's Studio B in New York City on August 14–16, 1963.

== Personnel ==
- Gary Burton — vibraphone
- Jim Hall — guitar
- Chuck Israels — bass
- Larry Bunker — drums
