= WATT Records =

American record label

- Founded: 1973
- Founder: Carla Bley and Michael Mantler
- Distributor(s): New Music Distribution Service, ECM Records
- Genre: Jazz, Avant-garde jazz, Experimental jazz
- Country of origin: U.S.
- Location: New York, NY

WATT Records was a record label, recording studio, and music publisher founded by Carla Bley and Michael Mantler in May 1973. WATT was distributed by ECM Records. Bley and Mantler also set up New Music Distribution Service to promote WATT and new music.

== Discography ==
Album	Artist	Year	Notes
No Answer	Michael Mantler	1973	
Tropic Appetites	Carla Bley	1974	
13 & ¾	Michael Mantler & Carla Bley	1975	
The Hapless Child	Carla Bley	1976	Texts by Edward Gorey
Silence	Michael Mantler	1976	Texts by Harold Pinter
Movies	Carla Bley	1977	
Dinner Music	The Carla Bley Band	1977	
European Tour 1977	Carla Bley	1978	
Musique Mecanique	Carla Bley	1979	
More Movies	Michael Mantler	1980	
Social Studies	Carla Bley	1981	
Something There	Michael Mantler	1982	
Live!	Carla Bley	1982	
I Hate to Sing	Carla Bley	1984	
Heavy Heart	Carla Bley	1984	
Alien	Michael Mantler	1985	
Night-Glo	Carla Bley	1985	
Sextet	Carla Bley	1987	
Live	Michael Mantler	1987	
Many Have No Speech	Michael Mantler	1987	
Duets	Carla Bley with Steve Swallow	1988	
Fleur Carnivore	Carla Bley	1989	
The Very Big Carla Bley Band	Carla Bley	1991	
Go Together	Carla Bley with Steve Swallow	1992	
Big Band Theory	Carla Bley	1993	
Songs with Legs	Carla Bley with Andy Sheppard and Steve Swallow	1994	
The Carla Bley Big Band Goes to Church	The Carla Bley Big Band	1996	
Fancy Chamber Music	Carla Bley	1998	
Are We There Yet?	Carla Bley with Steve Swallow	1999	
4x4	Carla Bley	2000	
Looking for America (album)	Carla Bley	2003	
The Lost Chords	Carla Bley	2004	
The Lost Chords find Paolo Fresu	Carla Bley	2007	
Appearing Nightly	Carla Bley	2008	
Carla's Christmas Carols	Carla Bley	2009	
