= Movies (Michael Mantler album) =

Studio album by Michael Mantler
- Released: February 1978
- Recorded: March 1977
- Studios: Grog Kill, US
- Genre: Jazz
- Length: 37:37
- Label: WATT
- Producer: Carla Bley

Michael Mantler chronology
Silence (1977)	Movies (1978)	More Movies (1980)

Professional ratings
Review scores
Source	Rating
AllMusic	4/5 stars
The Penguin Guide to Jazz Recordings	4/4 stars

Movies is a studio album by Austrian trumpeter Michael Mantler, leading guitarist Larry Coryell, keyboardist Carla Bley, bassist Steve Swallow and drummer Tony Williams. Recorded in March 1977 at Grog Kill Studios, US, it was released in 1978 by WATT Records.

== Track listing ==
All tracks are written by Michael Mantler.

Side one
No.	Title	Length
1.	"Movie One"	3:38
2.	"Movie Two"	5:28
3.	"Movie Three"	3:47
4.	"Movie Four"	5:57

Side two
No.	Title	Length
1.	"Movie Five"	3:20
2.	"Movie Six"	3:41
3.	"Movie Seven"	5:54
4.	"Movie Eight"	5:53
Total length:		37:37
