= The Jazz Composer's Orchestra (album) =

Studio album by Jazz Composer's Orchestra
- Released: 1968
- Recorded: January–July 1968
- Genre: Free jazz
- Length: 73:40
- Label: JCOA
- Producer: Michael Mantler

Jazz Composer's Orchestra chronology
Communication (1965)	The Jazz Composer's Orchestra (1968)	Escalator over the Hill (1971)

Professional ratings
Review scores
Source	Rating
Allmusic	4.5/5 stars
DownBeat	5/5 stars
The Penguin Guide to Jazz	3.5/4 stars
Rolling Stone	(favorable)
The Rolling Stone Jazz Record Guide	4/5 stars

The Jazz Composer's Orchestra is a 1968 album by the Jazz Composer's Orchestra recorded over a period of six months with Michael Mantler as composer, leader and producer. Many of the key figures in avant-garde jazz from the time contributed on the album including Don Cherry, Pharoah Sanders, Gato Barbieri, Larry Coryell, Roswell Rudd, and Carla Bley. The album's finale features a two-part concerto for Cecil Taylor and orchestra.

Mantler "updated" the album in 2014 as The Jazz Composer's Orchestra Update on ECM Records. It features the Nouvelle Cuisine Big Band, an orchestra with parallel instrumentation conducted by Christoph Cech and new soloists: Michael Mantler (trumpet), Bjarne Roupé (guitar), Wolfgang Puschnig (alto saxophone), Harry Sokal (tenor saxophone), David Helbock (piano), and the radio.string.quartet.vienna.

== Reception ==
Langdon Winner's Rolling Stone review stated "This is a record which all rock musicians as well as general audiences should listen to with care. The first JCOA album is a summit meeting on the Mount Olympus of contemporary jazz which deserves wide attention... By any standard of musical excellence it is a masterpiece."

Brian Olewnick of Allmusic stated: "The breadth of this piece, its expansiveness, and its tension between order and chaos is one of the single high-water marks of avant-garde jazz. Communications is a masterwork in and of itself and laid the basis for stunning work by others in decades hence, notably Barry Guy and his London Jazz Composer's Orchestra. It's an essential document for anyone interested in avant jazz and late-20th century creative music."

== Track listing ==
All tracks by Michael Mantler

1. "Communications #8" – 14:03
2. "Communications #9" – 8:14
3. "Communications #10" – 13:42
4. "Preview" – 3:29
5. "Communications #11" (part 1) – 15:32
6. "Communications #11" (part 2) – 18:14

== Personnel ==
- Michael Mantler – conductor, composer, producer
- Don Cherry – cornet, trumpet
- Randy Brecker – flugelhorn
- Stephen Furtado – flugelhorn
- Lloyd Michels – flugelhorn
- Bob Northern – French horn
- Julius Watkins – French horn
- Jimmy Knepper – trombone
- Roswell Rudd – trombone
- Jack Jeffers – bass trombone
- Howard Johnson – tuba
- Al Gibbons – soprano saxophone
- Steve Lacy – soprano saxophone
- Steve Marcus – soprano saxophone
- Bob Donovan – alto saxophone
- Gene Hull – alto saxophone
- Jimmy Lyons – alto saxophone
- Frank Wess – alto saxophone
- George Barrow – tenor saxophone
- Gato Barbieri – tenor saxophone
- Pharoah Sanders – tenor saxophone
- Lew Tabackin – tenor saxophone
- Charles Davis – baritone saxophone
- Carla Bley – piano
- Cecil Taylor – piano, liner notes
- Larry Coryell – guitar
- Kent Carter – bass
- Ron Carter – bass
- Bob Cunningham – bass
- Richard Davis – bass
- Eddie Gómez – bass
- Charlie Haden – bass
- Reggie Johnson – bass
- Alan Silva – bass
- Steve Swallow – bass
- Reggie Workman – bass
- Andrew Cyrille – drums
- Beaver Harris – drums

Production

- Paul Goodman – engineer
- Paul Haines – liner notes
- Paul McDonough – artwork, cover design
- Timothy Marquand – liner notes
