= Swallow (Steve Swallow album) =

Studio album by Steve Swallow
- Released: 1992
- Recorded: September–November 1991
- Studio: Grog Kill Studio, Willow, NY
- Genre: Jazz
- Length: 50:34
- Label: Xtra Watt 6
- Producer: Carla Bley & Steve Swallow

Steve Swallow chronology
Duets (1988)	Swallow (1992)	Go Together (1992)

Swallow is an album by bassist Steve Swallow released on the Xtra Watt label in 1992.

== Reception ==
Professional ratings
Review scores
Source	Rating
Allmusic	4.5/5 stars
The Penguin Guide to Jazz Recordings	3.5/4 stars

Allmusic awarded the album 4 1/2 stars and the review by Michael G. Nastos states: "All nine cuts were written by this premier electric bass guitarist and performed by a sextet with guests".

== Track listing ==
All compositions by Steve Swallow.

1. "Belles" - 3:59
2. "Soca Symphony" - 8:02
3. "Slender Thread" - 5:45
4. "Thrills and Spills" - 4:07
5. "William and Mary" - 5:49
6. "Doin' It Slow" - 7:30 Bonus track on CD
7. "Thirty Five" - 5:48
8. "Ballroom" - 5:13
9. "Playing with Water" - 4:21

== Personnel ==
- Steve Swallow - bass guitar
- Steve Kuhn - piano
- Carla Bley - organ
- Karen Mantler - synthesizer, harmonica
- Hiram Bullock, John Scofield - guitar
- Gary Burton - vibraphone
- Robby Ameen - drums
- Don Alias - percussion
