= Carla (album) =

Studio album by Steve Swallow
- Released: 1987
- Recorded: Winter 1986–1987
- Studio: Grog Kill Studio, Willow, NY
- Genre: Jazz
- Length: 40:36
- Label: Xtra Watt; 2
- Producer: Carla Bley & Steve Swallow

Steve Swallow chronology
Night-Glo (1985)	Carla (1987)	Duets (1988)

Carla is an album by the bassist Steve Swallow, released on the Xtra Watt label in 1987.

== Reception ==
Professional ratings
Review scores
Source	Rating
AllMusic	3/5 stars
The Penguin Guide to Jazz Recordings	3/4 stars

AllMusic's review by Scott Yanow states: "The post-bop music is reasonably unpredictable and, although not essential, holds one's interest".

== Track listing ==
All compositions by Steve Swallow.

1. "Deep Trouble" - 6:09
2. "Crab Alley" - 3:46
3. "Fred and Ethel" - 4:55
4. "Read My Lips" - 4:53
5. "Afterglow" - 6:01
6. "Hold It Against Me" - 5:37
7. "Count the Ways" - 3:48
8. "Last Night" - 5:42

== Personnel ==
- Steve Swallow - bass guitar, keyboards
- Larry Willis - piano
- Carla Bley - organ, additional keyboards
- Hiram Bullock - guitar
- Victor Lewis - drums
- Don Alias - percussion
- Ida Kavafian - violin
- Ikwhan Bae - viola
- Fred Sherry - cello
