= Escalator over the Hill =

Studio album by Carla Bley and Paul Haines
- Released: 1971
- Recorded: 1968–1971
- Genre: Avant-garde jazz; post-bop; rock opera; Third Stream
- Length: 103:35
- Label: JCOA Records (LP); WATT Records (CD)
- Producer: Michael Mantler

Jazz Composer's Orchestra chronology
The Jazz Composer's Orchestra (1968)	Escalator over the Hill (1971)	Relativity Suite (1973)

Carla Bley chronology
Jazz Realities (1966)	Escalator over the Hill (1971)	Tropic Appetites (1974)

Professional ratings
Review scores
Source	Rating
All About Jazz	(favorable)
AllMusic	3/5 stars
DownBeat	5/5 stars
The Penguin Guide to Jazz Recordings	3.5/4 stars
The Rolling Stone Jazz Record Guide	5/5 stars
Stylus	(favorable)

Escalator over the Hill (or EOTH) is mostly referred to as a jazz opera, but it was released as a "chronotransduction", with "words by Paul Haines, adaptation and music by Carla Bley, production and coordination by Michael Mantler", performed by the Jazz Composer's Orchestra.

== History ==
Escalator over the Hill is more than an hour and a half long and was recorded over three years (1968 to 1971). It was originally released as a triple LP box which also contained a booklet with lyrics, photos and profiles of the musicians. Side six of the original LPs ended in a locked groove, the final track "...And It's Again" continuing infinitely on manual record players. (For the CD reissue, the hum is allowed to play for 18 minutes before slowly fading out.)

In 1997, a live version of Escalator over the Hill, re-orchestrated by Jeff Friedman, was performed for the first time in Cologne, Germany. In 1998, "Escalator" toured Europe. Another live performance took place in May 2006 in Essen, Germany.

The musicians involved in the original recording play in various combinations, covering a wide range of musical genres, from Kurt Weill's theater music, to free jazz, rock and Indian music. Writer Stuart Broomer considers this to be a summing up "much of the creative energy that was loose between 1968 and 1972".

Viva acts as narrator. Jack Bruce also appears on bass and vocals. Among the vocalists is an early career Linda Ronstadt, in addition to Jeanne Lee, Paul Jones, Carla Bley, Don Preston, Sheila Jordan, and Bley's and Mantler's then-4-year-old daughter Karen Mantler.

== Reception ==
Jonathon Cott's Rolling Stone article stated: "Like an electric transformer, Escalator Over the Hill synthesizes and draws on an enormous range of musical materials – raga, jazz, rock, ring modulated piano sounds, all brought together through Carla Bley's extraordinary formal sense and ability to unify individual but diverse musical sections by means of the editing of the record medium... The opera is an international musical encounter of the first order."

Marcello Carlin, writing for Stylus Magazine, considers the album to be "the greatest record ever made." He said: "No protest, no social commentary. No expression of love, of grief, of hope, of despair. It is literally whatever you want to make of it. It is devoid of every quality which you might assume would qualify it to be the greatest of all records. And yet it is that tabula rasa in its heart, the blank space which may well exist at the very heart of all music, revealing the hard truth that we have to fill in the blanks, we have to interpret what is being played and sung, and our interpretation is the only one which can possibly be valid, as we cannot discern any perspective other than our own."

== Track listing ==
All lyrics are written by Paul Haines; all music is composed by Carla Bley.

Side one
No.	Title	Length
1.	"Hotel Overture"	13:11
Total length:		13:11

Side two
No.	Title	Length
1.	"This Is Here..."	6:02
2.	"Like Animals"	1:21
3.	"Escalator over the Hill"	4:57
4.	"Stay Awake"	1:31
5.	"Ginger and David"	1:39
6.	"Song to Anything That Moves"	2:22
Total length:		17:54

Side three
No.	Title	Length
1.	"EOTH Theme"	0:35
2.	"Businessmen"	5:38
3.	"Ginger and David Theme"	0:57
4.	"Why"	2:19
5.	"It's Not What You Do"	0:17
6.	"Detective Writer Daughter"	3:16
7.	"Doctor Why"	1:28
8.	"Slow Dance (Transductory Music)"	1:50
9.	"Smalltown Agonist"	5:24
Total length:		21:48

Side four
No.	Title	Length
1.	"End of Head"	0:38
2.	"Over Her Head"	2:38
3.	"Little Pony Soldier"	4:36
4.	"Oh Say Can You Do?"	1:11
5.	"Holiday in Risk"	3:10
6.	"Holiday in Risk Theme"	0:52
Total length:		13:07

Side five
No.	Title	Length
1.	"A.I.R. (All India Radio)"	3:58
2.	"Rawalpindi Blues"	12:44
Total length:		16:43

Side six
No.	Title	Length
1.	"End of Rawalpindi"	9:40
2.	"End of Animals"	1:26
3.	"...And It's Again"	8:55
Total length:		20:01 1:43:35

- The CD release has sides one to three on CD 1, and sides four to six on CD 2.
- "... And It's Again" runs for 27:17 on the CD release, with the locked groove at the end of the original LP playing for 18 minutes. This is followed by a hidden track (starting at 27:02) consisting of calliope music and Bill Leonard saying “Oh say can you do?”, followed by faint laughter.

== Personnel ==
=== Principal cast ===
- Jack, Parrot: Jack Bruce
- Leader, Mutant, Voice, Desert Women: Carla Bley
- Sand Shepherd: Don Cherry
- Ginger: Linda Ronstadt
- Ginger II: Jeanne Lee
- David: Paul Jones
- Doctor, Lion: Don Preston
- Viva: Viva
- Cecil Clark: Tod Papageorge
- His Friends: Charlie Haden, Steve Ferguson
- Calliope Bill: Bill Leonard
- Roomer: Bob Stewart
- Ancient Roomer: Karen Mantler
- Loudspeaker: Roswell Rudd
- Used Woman: Sheila Jordan
- Operasinger: Rosalind Hupp
- Nurse: Jane Blackstone
- Yodelling Ventriloquist: Howard Johnson
- Therapist: Timothy Marquand
- Dad: Perry Robinson
- Phantoms, Multiple Public Members, Hotelpeople, Women, Men, Flies, Bullfrogs, Mindsweepers, Speakers, Blindman:
Jane Blackstone, Carla Bley, Jonathan Cott, Sharon Freeman, Steve Gebhardt, Tyrus Gerlach, Eileen Hale, Rosalind Hupp, Jack Jeffers, Howard Johnson, Sheila Jordan, Michael Mantler, Timothy Marquand, Nancy Newton, Tod Papageorge, Don Preston, Bill Roughen, Phyllis Schneider, Bob Stewart, Pat Stewart, Viva

=== Musicians (alphabetical) ===
- Gato Barbieri – tenor saxophone
- Souren Baronian – clarinet
- Karl Berger – vibraphone
- Carla Bley – organ, celeste, chimes, calliope, piano
- Sam Brown – guitar
- Jack Bruce – bass, vocal
- John Buckingham – tuba
- Sam Burtis – trombone
- Bob Carlisle – French horn
- Don Cherry – trumpet
- Roger Dawson – congas, xylophone
- Sharon Freeman – French horn
- Charlie Haden – bass
- Peggy Imig – clarinet
- Jack Jeffers – bass trombone
- Leroy Jenkins – violin
- Howard Johnson – tuba
- Sheila Jordan – vocal
- Jimmy Knepper – trombone
- Jeanne Lee – vocal
- Jimmy Lyons – alto saxophone
- Michael Mantler – prepared piano, trumpet, valve trombone
- Ron McClure – bass
- John McLaughlin – guitar
- Bill Morimando – orchestra bells, celeste
- Paul Motian – drums, dumbec
- Nancy Newton – viola
- Don Preston – Moog synthesizer
- Enrico Rava – trumpet
- Perry Robinson – clarinet
- Linda Ronstadt – vocal
- Roswell Rudd – trombone
- Calo Scott – cello
- Michael Snow – trumpet
- Chris Woods – baritone saxophone
- Richard Youngstein – bass

=== Musicians (chronotransductional) ===
==== Orchestra (& Hotel Lobby Band) ====
- Carla Bley (piano)
- Jimmy Lyons (alto saxophone)
- Gato Barbieri (tenor saxophone)
- Chris Woods (baritone saxophone)
- Michael Mantler, Enrico Rava (trumpet)
- Roswell Rudd, Sam Burtis, Jimmy Knepper (trombone)
- Jack Jeffers (bass trombone)
- Bob Carlisle, Sharon Freeman (French horn)
- John Buckingham (tuba)
- Nancy Newton (viola)
- Karl Berger (vibraphone)
- Charlie Haden (bass)
- Paul Motian (drums)
- Roger Dawson (congas)
- Bill Morimando (orchestra bells, celeste).

==== Jack's Traveling Band ====
- Carla Bley (organ)
- John McLaughlin (guitar)
- Jack Bruce (bass)
- Paul Motian (drums)

==== Desert Band ====
- Carla Bley (organ)
- Don Cherry (trumpet)
- Souren Baronian (clarinet)
- Leroy Jenkins (violin)
- Calo Scott (cello)
- Sam Brown (guitar)
- Ron McClure (bass)
- Paul Motian (dumbec)

==== Original Hotel Amateur Band ====
- Carla Bley (piano)
- Michael Snow (trumpet)
- Michael Mantler (valve trombone)
- Howard Johnson (tuba)
- Perry Robinson, Peggy Imig (clarinet)
- Nancy Newton (viola)
- Richard Youngstein (bass)
- Paul Motian (drums)

==== Phantom Music ====
- Carla Bley (organ, celeste, chimes, calliope)
- Michael Mantler (prepared piano)
- Don Preston (Moog synthesizer)

== Awards ==
- Jazz Album of the Year 1972 by a Melody Maker Readers Poll
- Oscar du meilleur disque de jazz moderne (best modern jazz album) in 1972, given by the Académie du Jazz.
