= Tropic Appetites =

Studio album by Carla Bley
- Released: 1974
- Recorded: 1973–74
- Genres: Post-bop, jazz
- Label: WATT Records/ECM Watt 1
- Producer: Michael Mantler

Carla Bley chronology
Escalator over the Hill (1971)	Tropic Appetites (1974)	Dinner Music (1976)

Professional ratings
Review scores
Source	Rating
Allmusic	4.5/5 stars
The Rolling Stone Jazz Record Guide	3/5 stars
The Penguin Guide to Jazz Recordings	3.5/4 stars
Tom Hull	B+

Tropic Appetites is a jazz album by Carla Bley released in 1974, following her debut Escalator over the Hill. The lyrics are contributed by Bley's friend Paul Haines, based on his journeys to Southeast Asia in the preceding years. Unlike on the orchestral Escalator, the band is an octet, with Julie Tippetts as lead vocalist.

== Track listing ==
1. "What Will Be Left Between Us and the Moon Tonight?" − 11:06
2. "In India" − 1:11
3. "Enormous Tots" − 6:06
4. "Caucasian Bird Riffles" − 5:10
5. "Funnybird Song" − 1:19
6. "Indonesian Dock Sucking Supreme" − 8:56
7. "Song of the Jungle Stream" − 10:15
8. "Nothing" − 3:35

== Personnel ==
- Gato Barbieri (uncredited) − tenor sax, percussion
- Carla Bley − organ, piano, electric piano, celeste, cello, marimba, percussion, vocals, clavinet, producer, engineer
- Paul Haines − performer
- Dave Holland − bass, cello
- Howard Johnson − tuba, bass clarinet, baritone sax, soprano sax, vocals
- Michael Mantler − trombone, trumpet, valve trombone, producer
- Toni Marcus − violin, viola
- Paul Motian − drums, percussion
- Julie Tippetts − vocals
- Karen Mantler – vocals
