= Harcsa =

Harcsa is a Hungarian surname. Notable people with the surname include:

- Veronika Harcsa (born 1982), Hungarian singer and songwriter
- Zoltán Harcsa (born 1992), Hungarian boxer
