= Go Together =

Studio album by Carla Bley & Steve Swallow
- Released: 1993
- Recorded: Summer 1992
- Genre: Jazz
- Length: 52:32
- Label: Watt/ECM
- Producer: Carla Bley & Steve Swallow

Carla Bley chronology
The Very Big Carla Bley Band (1990)	Go Together (1993)	Big Band Theory (1993)

Steve Swallow chronology
Swallow (1991)	Go Together (1992)	Real Book (1993)

Go Together is an album of duets by the American composer, bandleader and keyboardist Carla Bley and bassist Steve Swallow, recorded and released on the Watt/ECM label in 1993. It is the pair's second duet recording following Duets (1988).

== Reception ==
The AllMusic review by Scott Yanow stated: "A melodic but explorative player, Bley (whose use of space sometimes recalls Thelonious Monk) interacts closely with the electric bass of Steve Swallow on this excellent duet session". The Penguin Guide to Jazz called it "an intriguingly relaxed and unhurried survey of (mostly) older material".

Professional ratings
Review scores
Source	Rating
AllMusic	4/5 stars
Tom Hull	B+
The Penguin Guide to Jazz	3/4 stars

== Track listing ==
All compositions by Carla Bley except where noted.

1. "Sing Me Softly of the Blues" - 5:52
2. "Mother of the Dead Man" - 5:54
3. "Masquerade in 3 Parts: Carnation/Dark Glasses/Mustache" (Steve Swallow) - 13:08
4. "Ad Infinitum" - 5:56
5. "Copyright Royalties" - 6:31
6. "Peau Douce" (Swallow) - 4:46
7. "Doctor" - 4:21
8. "Fleur Carnivore" - 6:21

- Recorded at Grog Kill Studio, Willow, New York in the Summer of 1992.

== Personnel ==
- Carla Bley - piano
- Steve Swallow - bass guitar
