= Golnar Shahyar =

Iranian-Canadian musician and activist, born 1985

Golnar Shahyar گلنار شهیار
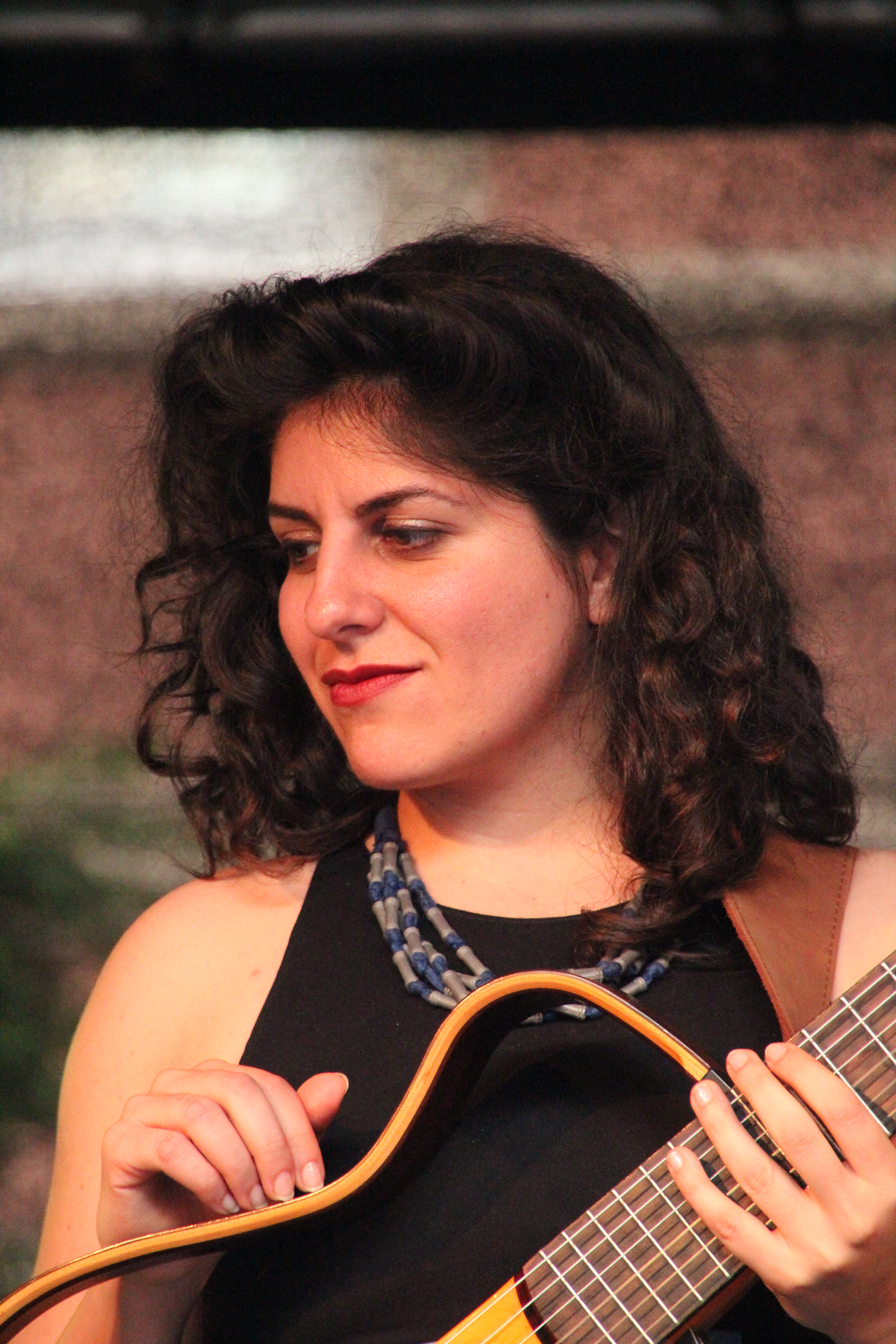

Background information
- Born: 1985 (age 40–41); Tehran, Iran
- Genres: avant-garde jazz
- Occupations: Musician and music curator
- Instruments: Vocals, guitar, piano
- Years active: 2014–present
- Labels: Lotus Records, Vienna
- Member of: Golnar & Mahan Trio
- Website: golnarshahyar.com

Golnar Shahyar (Persian: گلنار شهیار, born 1985) is an Iranian-Canadian musician active as composer, singer, guitarist and pianist. After her teenage years in Iran, she moved to Canada in 2002. Since 2008 she has lived in Austria and is known both as solo performer and in several groups. Apart from other musical traditions, her music is inspired both by Iranian music as well as by ethno jazz.

Among other venues, Shahyar has performed at the Vienna Musikverein, the Royal Festival Hall, London, and the Elbphilharmonie in Hamburg. In her performances and interviews, she has also spoken out for the feminist movement in Iran. She is known for her activism for diversity in Austria's cultural scenes.

== Life and career ==
Shahyar was born in Tehran into a middle-class family; she lived there until she was 17. In 2001, she moved with her parents to Toronto, Canada, where she later earned a bachelor's degree in biology from York University. In 2008, having decided to embark on a career in music, she relocated to Vienna, where she studied singing and music theory at the University of Music and Performing Arts.

Shahyar draws her musical inspiration from various musical cultures, ranging from North African and Iranian music to jazz and contemporary ethno jazz. In addition to her native Persian, she also sings in English, Kurdish, Turkish, Spanish and Ladino, the language of the Jewish-Sephardic population of al-Andalus. With her protest song "Tell my mother she has no daughter anymore", sung in Persian, she quoted a slogan of the feminist revolution in Iran. It expresses the grief about women who have fallen victim to oppression in Iran. In November 2022, this composition was recorded live at the Viennese jazz club Porgy & Bess.

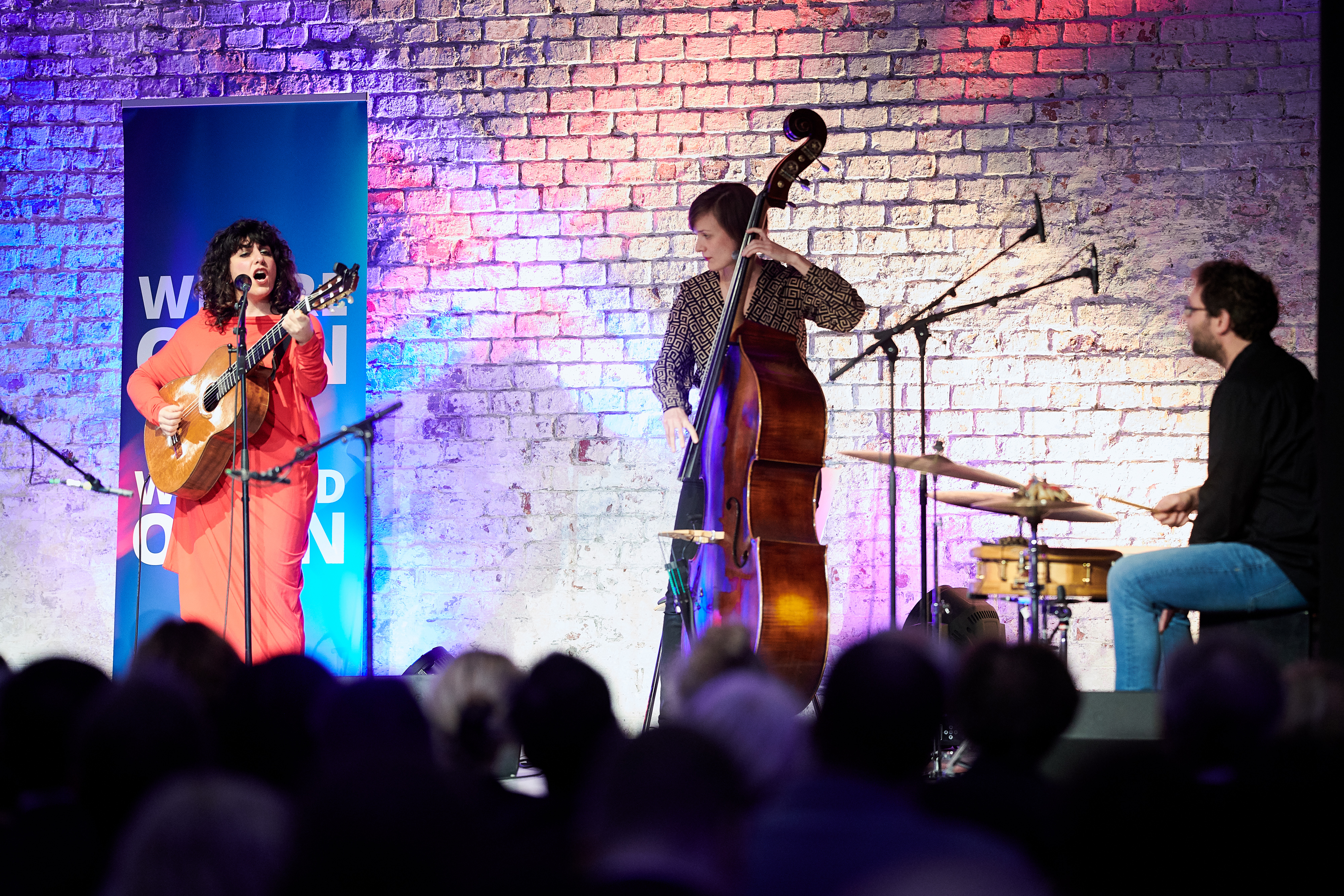
Golnar Shahyar, Judith Ferstl und András Dés at the opening ceremony of the Central European University Vienna on 15 November 2019

Shahyar has become known through her performances and recordings in various groups. With guitarist Mahan Mirarab and percussionist Shayan Fathi, she founded the world music trio Sehrang and released the album Dar Lahze in 2014. She has also performed with Mirarab and percussionist Amir Wahba as the Golnar & Mahan Trio, for example in November 2023 at the Vienna Konzerthaus. In the trio Gabbeh, Shahyar has appeared as singer along clarinetist Mona Matbou Riahi and bassist Manu Mayr. On 15 November 2019, Shahyar played with bassist Judith Ferstl and drummer András Dés at the opening of the Central European University in Vienna.

In 2017, Shahyar was featured on BBC World Service in a programme of global beats from Iran. On 16 November 2022, she took to the stage along with other Iranian and international musicians during the Woman, Life, Freedom Festival for solidarity with women in Iran at the Royal Festival Hall. In May 2024, she and clarinetist Kinan Azmeh appeared as guest artists with the NDR Bigband at the Elbphilharmonie in Hamburg.

In addition to her performances and studio productions as a singer and instrumentalist, Shahyar has also worked as actress and composer of music for theatre, dance and contemporary opera. In the 2017/2018 season, she served as artistic director for the festival The Female Voice of Iran at the Zeitgenössische Oper Berlin. In the 2022 musical theatre Negar at the Deutsche Oper Berlin, Shahyar played and sang the title role for music composed by fellow Iranian musician Keyvan Chemirani.

With the aim of attracting due attention to musicians and other artists, especially from the so-called "independent scenes", Shahyar published an Open letter to music and cultural journalists in Austria in 2020. In this appeal, she criticized the "widespread marginalization", especially of artists from migrant communities in the established cultural sectors. She further called for appropriate representation of the diverse cultural expressions and cultural influences and ended her appeal as "an invitation to more solidarity in the Austrian music industry."

== Discography ==
- Dar Lahze with Trio Sehrang, Lotus Records, Vienna 2014
- Sormeh with Mona Matbou Riahi und Jelena Popržan, Lotus Records 2014
- Derakht with Golnar & Mahan Trio, Lotus Records 2017
- Tear Drop, Klaeng Records 2022, shortlisted for the German Jazz Award 2023 as Debut Album of the Year International

== Literature ==
- Johnson, Bruce (12 August 2016). Jazz and Totalitarianism. Routledge. p. 319. ISBN 978-1-317-49942-8.
