= Folly Seeing All This =

Studio album by Michael Mantler
- Released: 1993
- Recorded: June 1992
- Genre: Avant-garde jazz; chamber jazz; third stream
- Length: 44:44
- Label: ECM; ECM 1485
- Producer: Michael Mantler

Michael Mantler chronology
| Michael Mantler Live (1987) | Folly Seeing All This (1993) | Cerco un Paese Innocente (1995) |

Folly Seeing All This is an album by Austrian jazz trumpeter Michael Mantler recorded in June 1992 and released on ECM the following year. The ensemble features guitarist Rick Fenn, flautist Wolfgang Puschnig, pianist Karen Mantler, percussionist Dave Adams and the Balanescu Quartet, with a guest appearance from vocalist Jack Bruce singing Samuel Beckett's final poem, "What Is the Word".

== Reception ==
The AllMusic review by Peter Nappi stated: "At once melodic and challenging, Folly Seeing All This is experimental chamber jazz at its most enjoyable."

Professional ratings
Review scores
| Source | Rating |
|---|---|
| AllMusic | 3/5 stars |
| Tom Hull | B |
| The Penguin Guide to Jazz Recordings | 3/4 stars |

== Track listing ==
All music is composed by Michael Mantler

| No. | Title | Lyrics | Length |
|---|---|---|---|
| 1. | "Folly Seeing All This" | | 28:44 |
| 2. | "News" | | 11:31 |
| 3. | "What Is the Word" | Samuel Beckett | 4:37 |

== Personnel ==
- Michael Mantler – trumpet
- Rick Fenn – guitar
- Wolfgang Puschnig – alto flute
- Karen Mantler – piano, voice ("What Is the Word")
- Dave Adams – vibraphone, chimes
- The Balanescu Quartet
  - Alexander Balanescu – violin
  - Clare Connors – violin
  - Bill Hawkes – viola
  - Jane Fenton – cello
- Jack Bruce – voice ("What Is the Word")
