= I Hate to Sing =

Live album by Carla Bley
- Released: 1984
- Recorded: August 19–21, 1981 & January 11–13, 1983
- Genre: Jazz
- Length: 48:09
- Label: Watt/ECM
- Producer: Carla Bley

Carla Bley chronology
Live! (1981)	I Hate to Sing (1984)	Heavy Heart (1983)

I Hate to Sing is a live album by American composer, bandleader and keyboardist Carla Bley recorded at the Great American Music Hall in 1981 (at the same concerts that produced Live!) combined with three tracks recorded at Grog Kill Studios in 1983 and released on the Watt/ECM label in 1984.

== Reception ==
The AllMusic review by Stacia Proefrock stated "here the airy, goofy tone seems to be the only thing holding the album together. Fans of the Carla Bley Band will appreciate the group's jovial performance and loose, swinging style, but this is little more than a novelty album". The Penguin Guide to Jazz awarded the album 2 stars. The JazzTimes review by Willard Jenkins said, "There's a comic, antic quality afoot here-and isn't that what one expects from Bley in regular doses? The dose is over the top here, particularly on the title track. Certain band members, including the boss, take turns letting the listener know in no uncertain terms why they are instrumentalists and not singers. Dissonant voices collide with dissonant chords on track one, anchored by Steve Swallow's distinctive electric bass on "The Internationale." This one is perhaps even more madcap than usual because of the confluence of flat, non-singing singers balanced with a sort of Germanic romanticism that in places would have brought a smile to Kurt Weill".

Professional ratings
Review scores
Source	Rating
AllMusic	2.5/5 stars
Tom Hull	B+
The Penguin Guide to Jazz	2/4 stars

== Track listing ==
All compositions by Carla Bley.

1. "The Internationale" - 5:58
2. "Murder" - 3:57
3. "Very Very Simple" - 6:47
4. "I Hate to Sing" - 8:22
5. "The Piano Lesson" - 6:08
6. "The Lone Arranger" - 9:06
7. "Battleship" - 7:53
- Recorded at the Great American Music Hall, San Francisco, California on August 19–21, 1981 (tracks 1–4) and at Grog Kill Studio, Willow, New York, on January 11–13, 1983 (tracks 5–7).

== Personnel ==
- Carla Bley - organ, glockenspiel, piano (track 3), voice (tracks 2 & 3)
- Michael Mantler - trumpet
- Steve Slagle - alto saxophone, soprano saxophone, clarinet, voice (track 6)
- Tony Dagradi - tenor saxophone
- Vincent Chancey - french horn
- Gary Valente - trombone, voice (track 6)
- Earl McIntyre - tuba (track 1)
- Arturo O'Farrill - piano, organ (track 3)
- Steve Swallow - bass guitar, voice (track 6), drums (track 4)
- D. Sharpe - drums, voice (track 4)
