= Paul Haines (poet) =

Canadian songwriter and poet (1933–2003)

Paul Haines (1932 – January 21, 2003) was an American poet and jazz lyricist. Born in Vassar, Michigan, Haines eventually settled in Canada after spending time in Europe, Asia, and the United States; he had a long stint as a French teacher at Fenelon Falls Secondary School, in Ontario, Canada. Active in New York City in the 60s, he recorded Albert Ayler's Ghosts. A second recording made by Ayler called Spiritual Unity (1965) included a printed folio with text by Paul Haines called "You and the Night and Music."

Haines's best-known work is Escalator over the Hill, a collaboration with Carla Bley.

Haines and his wife Jo Hayward had three children: Emily, Avery and Tim. Emily Haines is a songwriter and musician with Metric, Broken Social Scene, and Emily Haines & The Soft Skeleton. Avery Haines is a Canadian television journalist and television show host. Tim Haines is owner of Bluestreak Records in Peterborough, Ontario, Canada.

== Bibliography ==
=== Poetry ===
- Third World Two, Self-published (1981)
- Secret Carnival Workers, Coach House Books (2007)

=== Producer ===
- Ghosts by Albert Ayler
- New York Eye and Ear Control by Michael Snow
- Footloose by Paul Bley

=== Musical interpretations of his poetry ===
- Escalator over the Hill, jazz opera by Carla Bley with libretto by Haines (WATT, 1971)
- "Smalltown Agonist" / "Little Pony Soldier", single release from Escalator (WATT, 1971)
- Tropic Appetites by Carla Bley (WATT, 1974)
- Paul Haines – Darn It!, project produced by Kip Hanrahan, with Haines on two tracks (American Clavé, 1993)
- A Beautiful Western Saddle by Curlew (Tom Cora, Amy Denio a.o.), with Haines on two tracks (Cuneiform, 1993)
- "Halts" on Trace by Roof with Phil Minton, Tom Cora, Michael Vatcher and Luc Ex (Red Note, 1999)
- Passages by Jesse Stewart and Paul Haines, Guelph Jazz Festival.
- Which Side Are You On by 4 Walls with Minton, Vatcher, Ex and Veryan Weston (Red Note, 2004)

=== References to Paul Haines ===
- "Fame finds Dubin at last," Miller, Mark. The Globe and Mail; Toronto, Ont. 13 Jan 1979: 37. “Another piece, probably to be called Circuitry (the titles for what were essentially spontaneous compositions are being extracted by Snow from an essay by Paul Haines, Larry’s Listening, which will accompany the record), is largely a duet, pairing Dubin with programmed synthesizer patterns.”
- The Globe and Mail, Nov 14, 1981, p. A4. Paul Haines' video showing at The Music Gallery, Toronto.
- Heroes, Stephen Smith, The Globe and Mail, 1991 29 June 1991: C1. John Oswald selects Paul Haines as a Canadian hero.
- Sub Rosa [Peterborough, Ontario, Canada], vol. 5 No. 1, Spring 1995 issue devoted entirely to "Paul Haines: Poetry/ Video/ Jazz", by Tom Sekowski, Stuart Broomer, Roswell Rudd and Michel Contat. Edited by Daniel Kernohan.
- Where Words and Music Converge: Escalator on Tour, By Mike Zwerin, International Herald Tribune, July 5, 1998. The article discusses the revival of the piece with a new tour at the time. Before this the piece had never been played live.
- "Paul Haines" by Andrew Jones, Jazziz, November 1995.
- "Paul Haines / Now Can You Tell Me: An Article by Stuart Broomer: Words and Music: A Beautiful Western Saddle", Coda, July/August 1995.
- "Paul Haines - The Musical Psychic", by Tom Sekowski. Exclaim! [Canada], March 1995.
- "Paul Haines - Man with a Future Vision", by Tom Sekowski, The Newspaper [Toronto, Canada], 11/23/94."
- Toronto Star (1971-2009); Toronto, Ontario [Toronto, Ontario] 22 Oct 1994: F14. Geoff Chapman's Jazz Column has a review of "Darn It," entitled "Peterson and Perlman lack spark, Burning for Buddy cooks unevenly” Jazz." Chapman writes: "Darn It! (American Clave) is a two CD anthology of poems by Paul Haines with an army of jazz folk providing acoustic, impressionistic settings for his obscure, minimalist texts. Contributors include Paul Bley, Don Pullen, Evan Parker, Henry Threadgill, and Canada’s Mary Margaret O’Hara and D. D. Jackson among nearly 60 musicians performing 33 songs."
- "His words fit into music 'like fish in water'" by Carl Wilson, The Globe and Mail, May 8, 2003, page R7. "“He wrote a glorious dada-polemic booklet for the original pressing of Ayler’s 1964 Spiritual Unity, a key album in jazz history…,” ibid.
- "Sometimes good isn't enough,"Pennee, Robert. The Guelph Mercury, 08 Sep 2003: B6.
- "A word with the past, a look to the future" by Robert Everett-Green, The Globe and Mail, July 25, 2007.
- "Paul Haines" by Andrew Jones, JAZZIZ, November 1995.
- "Paul Haines - Now Can You Tell Me: An Article by Stuart Bloomer: Words and Music: A Beautiful Western Saddle", Coda Magazine, July/Aug 1995.
- "Paul Haines - The Musical Psychic", by Tom Sekowski. Exclaim! [Canada], March 1995.
- "Paul Haines - Man with a Future Vision", by Tom Sekowski, The Newspaper [Toronto, Canada], 11/23/94.
- "Where Words and Music Converge : 'Escalator' on Tour," By Mike Zwerin, International Herald Tribune, July 15, 1998.
- "Paul Haines," Michel Contat, Le Monde; Paris [Paris]. 01 Feb 2003: p. 18.
- Siena/ symposium: Paul Haines attends the Siena Jazz Festival and University, reflects on jazz education and later collects a variety of views on its meaning Coda Magazine Iss. 307, (Jan/Feb 2003): 36–46.
- "His words fit into music 'like fish in water,' by Carl Wilson,The Globe and Mail, 08 May 2003.
- by Carl Wilson,The Globe and Mail, 08 May 2003, p. R7.
- "Paul Haines - Memorial Program" on Jazz Profiles hosted by Ben Young, WKCR-FM, Columbia University, New York City.
- "A word with the past, a look to the future," by Robert Everett- Green. The Globe and Mail, 25 July 2007, pg. R3. Interview with daughter musician Emily Haines where she discusses her father's influence.

=== Videography ===
- Jubilee (1992, 21 mins)
- Our Rudd's Golden Curtain (1992, 19 mins)
- Learning to Cope with Hope (1992, 3 mins)
- An All-Ethnic Electric Program (1992 transfer from 1966 16mm., 25 mins)
- Curlew: Paul Haines Set to Music (1989, 44 mins)
- Rice Scented in our Absence (1983, 33 mins)
- Third World Two (1981, 50mins)--50 poems (French and English) read or sung by an all-star cast, with original music by Carla Bley, Derek Bailey, Steve Swallow and Sheila Jordan.
- Understanding an Interruption; 16 Musics (1981, 60 mins)--Paul Bley, Rudd-Lacy, Albert Ayler, Mike Mantler, Gary Burton, Evan Parker, Derek Bailey, Larry Dubin-CCMC, Carla Bley, Monica Zetterlund, Stuart Broomer, and Kip Hanrahan.

=== Live Event ===
- An Evening of Poetry & Jazz, November 25, 1995, Market Hall, Peterborough: Michael Snow & Jack Vorvis performed a set of free improvisation and then Paul Haines presented his videos. The show sold out. It was produced by Daniel Kernohan in cooperation with Artspace and the Kawartha Jazz Society.

=== Mix tapes ===
Haines produced a number of audio cassette "mystery tapes", mostly drawn from his personal recording collection. These were not commercially issued but only passed around to friends and associates.
