= Home (Steve Swallow album) =

Studio album by Steve Swallow
- Released: 1980
- Recorded: September 1979
- Studio: Columbia Recording Studios; New York City
- Genre: Jazz
- Length: 42:16
- Label: ECM 1159
- Producer: Manfred Eicher

Steve Swallow chronology
Hotel Hello (1974)	Home (1980)	Night-Glo (1985)

Home is an album by bassist Steve Swallow recorded in September 1979 and released on the ECM label. The sextet features featuring Sheila Jordan singing the poetry of Robert Creeley, backed by pianist Steve Kuhn, saxophonist David Liebman, Lyle Mays on synthesizer, and drummer Bob Moses.

== Reception ==
The AllMusic review by Ron Wynn awarded the album 2½ stars calling it an "Interesting concept".

Professional ratings
Review scores
Source	Rating
Allmusic	2.5/5 stars
The Penguin Guide to Jazz Recordings	3.5/4 stars

== Track listing ==
All music by Steve Swallow and text by Robert Creeley

1. "Some Echoes" – 5:37
2. ""She Was Young..." (From "The Finger")" – 3:34
3. ""Nowhere One..."" – 5:01
4. "Colors" – 4:23
5. "Home" – 3:24
6. "In the Fall" – 4:00
7. ""You Didn't Think..."" – 2:55
8. "Ice Cream" – 4:17
9. "Echo" – 5:23
10. "Midnight" – 3:42

== Personnel ==
- Steve Swallow – electric bass
- Sheila Jordan – voice
- Steve Kuhn – piano
- David Liebman – saxophones
- Lyle Mays – synthesizer
- Bob Moses – drums
