= Musique Mecanique =

Studio album by Carla Bley
- Released: 1979
- Recorded: August–November 1978
- Studio: Grog Kill Studio, Willow, New York
- Genre: Jazz
- Length: 44:51
- Label: Watt/ECM
- Producer: Carla Bley

Carla Bley chronology
European Tour 1977 (1977)	Musique Mecanique (1979)	Social Studies (1980)

Musique Mecanique is an album by American composer, bandleader and keyboardist Carla Bley, recorded in 1978 and released on the Watt/ECM label in 1979.

== Reception ==
The AllMusic review by Scott Yanow stated, "Carla Bley's tentet performs some of her most colorful themes on this often-humorous and generally stimulating set". The Penguin Guide to Jazz awarded the album 3 stars. Robert Christgau commented, "I'm still attracted to Bley's humor, best displayed here in the title piece, a wry take on the charms and imperfections of the mechanical mode. But this is basically desultory, hinting at the feckless formalism an obsession with textures so often conceals. Beyond the jokes, and the deliberately aborted moments of lyricism, she really doesn't have much to say. Weill sure did. And so did Satie."

Professional ratings
Review scores
Source	Rating
AllMusic	4/5 stars
Christgau's Record Guide	B
The Penguin Guide to Jazz	3/4 stars
The Rolling Stone Album Guide	4/5 stars

== Track listing ==
All compositions by Carla Bley.

1. "440" - 9:48
2. "Jesus Maria and Other Spanish Strains" - 11:54
3. "Musique Mecanique I" - 9:46
4. "Musique Mecanique II (At Midnight)" - 7:02
5. "Musique Mecanique III" - 6:28

== Personnel ==
- Carla Bley - organ, piano (track 2), toy piano (track 3)
- Michael Mantler - trumpet
- Alan Braufman - alto saxophone, clarinet, flute
- Gary Windo - tenor saxophone, bass clarinet, vocal
- John Clark - french horn
- Roswell Rudd - trombone, vocal on "Musique Mecanique II (At Midnight)"
- Bob Stewart - tuba
- Terry Adams - piano, electric pump organ
- Steve Swallow - bass guitar
- D. Sharpe - drums
- Charlie Haden - acoustic bass (track 2)
- Eugene Chadbourne - acoustic guitar, electric guitar, walkie-talkie (track 2)
- Karen Mantler - glockenspiel
