= Karen Mantler =

American jazz musician (born 1966)

Karen Mantler (born 25 April 1966, in New York City, New York, United States) is an American jazz pianist, singer, and composer. She is the daughter of musician-composers Carla Bley and Michael Mantler.

== Career ==
Her musical debut consisted of contributing vocals on Carla Bley's album Escalator Over the Hill (1971) at the age of four, followed by appearing on Bley's Tropic Appetites (1974). She then continued performing and recording on glockenspiel, organ and chromatic harmonica in many of Carla Bley's ensembles and projects from 1977 on to the present.

She studied at the Berklee College of Music in Boston on a scholarship from 1985 to 1987. She moved back to New York City in 1987 where she formed her own ensemble to record her first two albums for the XtraWATT record label (distributed by ECM Records), My Cat Arnold (1989) and Karen Mantler and Her Cat Arnold Get the Flu (1990). The band toured Europe several times and also appeared at venues in New York, on David Sanborn's Night Music television show, and at the Montreal International Jazz Festival (1991). She recorded two more albums of her music, Farewell (XtraWATT, 1996) and Pet Project (Virgin Classics, 2000). In 2003 she collaborated with Robert Wyatt on his album Cuckooland, playing keyboards, singing and contributing three compositions.

She has performed and recorded with a wide variety of musicians including Steve Swallow, Motohiko Hino, Michael Mantler, Terry Adams, Robbie Dupree, Artie Traum, Peter Blegvad, John Greaves, Chris Cutler, Dagmar Krause, Annie Whitehead, Anton Fier's band The Golden Palominos, the Ghost Train Orchestra, Kronos Quartet, and Tony Scherr. She has also been featured in Hal Willner productions.

As well as creating the WATTxtraWATT web site, she has been the designer of every WATT and XtraWATT CD cover and booklet since 2003.

At the same time she has been working with her trio featuring bassist Kato Hideki and multi-instrumentalist Doug Wieselman. Her fifth recording as a leader, entitled Business Is Bad, was released in June 2014 (XtraWATT/14).

In April 2024, Mantler was a guest vocalist with Ghost Train Orchestra and Kronos Quartet performing a Moondog repertoire at New York's Town Hall.

== Discography ==
=== As leader ===
- My Cat Arnold (XtraWATT, 1989)
- Karen Mantler and Her Cat Arnold Get the Flu (XtraWATT, 1990)
- Farewell (XtraWATT, 1996)
- Karen Mantler's Pet Project (Virgin, 2000)
- Business Is Bad (XtraWATT, 2014)

With Carla Bley

- Escalator Over the Hill (JCOA, 1971)
- Tropic Appetites (WATT, 1974)
- Musique Mecanique (WATT, 1979)
- Fleur Carnivore (WATT, 1989)
- The Very Big Carla Bley Band (WATT, 1991)
- Big Band Theory (WATT, 1993)
- The Carla Bley Big Band Goes to Church (WATT, 1996)
- Looking for America (WATT, 2003)
- Appearing Nightly (WATT, 2008)

With others

- Carried Away, Robbie Dupree (Village Green/Gold Castle, 1989)
- Verlaine, John Greaves (Harmonia Mundi)
- Sailing Stone, Motohiko Hino (Gramavision, 1992)
- It's There, Motohiko Hino (Enja, 1993)
- Folly Seeing All This, Michael Mantler (ECM, 1993)
- The School of Understanding, Michael Mantler (ECM, 1997)
- Swallow, Steve Swallow (XtraWATT, 1992)
- South of Lafayette, Artie Traum (Roaring Stream, 2002)
- Cuckooland, Robert Wyatt (Rykodisc, 2003)
- Go Figure, Peter Blegvad (ReR, 2017)
- Songs and Symphoniques: The Music of Moondog, Ghost Train Orchestra (2023)
