= Heavy Heart (album) =

Studio album by Carla Bley
- Released: 1984
- Recorded: September–October, 1983
- Studio: Grog Kill Studio, Willow, New York
- Genre: Jazz
- Length: 38:55
- Label: Watt/ECM
- Producer: Carla Bley

Carla Bley chronology
I Hate to Sing (1981–83)	Heavy Heart (1984)	Night-Glo (1985)

Heavy Heart is an album by American composer, bandleader and keyboardist Carla Bley, recorded in 1983 and released on the Watt/ECM label in 1984.

== Reception ==
The AllMusic review by Richard S. Ginell stated that "while Heavy Heart is a somewhat bright, light-minded album, there are plenty of dark undercurrents to be heard". The Penguin Guide to Jazz awarded the album 2 stars.

Professional ratings
Review scores
Source	Rating
AllMusic	3/5 stars
DownBeat	3/5 stars
Tom Hull	B+
The Penguin Guide to Jazz	2/4 stars

== Track listing ==
All compositions by Carla Bley.

1. "Light or Dark" - 6:04
2. "Talking Hearts" - 6:49
3. "Joyful Noise" - 5:08
4. "Ending It" - 6:04
5. "Starting Again" - 5:04
6. "Heavy Heart" - 9:50

== Personnel ==
- Carla Bley - organ, synthesizer
- Michael Mantler - trumpet
- Steve Slagle - alto saxophone, baritone saxophone, flute
- Gary Valente - trombone
- Earl McIntyre - tuba
- Kenny Kirkland - piano
- Hiram Bullock - guitar
- Steve Swallow - bass guitar
- Victor Lewis - drums
- Manolo Badrena - percussion
