= European Tour 1977 =

Studio album by the Carla Bley Band
- Released: 1978
- Recorded: September 1977
- Studios: Bavaria Musik, Munich, Germany
- Genre: Jazz
- Length: 42:30
- Label: Watt/ECM
- Producer: Carla Bley

Carla Bley chronology
Dinner Music (1976)	European Tour 1977 (1978)	Musique Mecanique (1978)

European Tour 1977 is an album by American composer, bandleader and keyboardist Carla Bley. Recorded in 1977 in Munich, Germany, it was released on the Watt/ECM label in 1978.

== Reception ==
Professional ratings
Review scores
Source	Rating
AllMusic	4.5/5 stars
Christgau's Record Guide	A−
DownBeat	4/5 stars
The Penguin Guide to Jazz	3/4 stars

Scott Yanow of AllMusic stated: "One of Carla Bley's most rewarding recordings ... unusual, somewhat innovative and always fun music." The Milwaukee Journal considered it "among the funniest jazz albums ever made." In 1996, Billboard noted that Bley has "been steadily praised for integrating whimsy into her scores... On European Tour 1977, there was a daffy nature to the sophisticated orchestration."

== Track listing ==
All compositions by Carla Bley

1. "Rose and Sad Song" - 11:11
2. "Wrong Key Donkey" - 7:52
3. "Drinking Music" - 4:26
4. "Spangled Banner Minor and Other Patriotic Songs" (Including Flags, And Now the Queen, King Korn, and The New National Anthem) - 19:17

== Personnel ==
- Carla Bley – organ, tenor saxophone
- Michael Mantler – trumpet
- Elton Dean – alto saxophone
- Gary Windo – tenor saxophone
- John Clark – french horn, guitar
- Roswell Rudd – trombone
- Bob Stewart – tuba
- Terry Adams – piano
- Hugh Hopper – bass guitar, bass drum
- Andrew Cyrille – drums
