= Kian Soltani =

Austrian-Iranian cellist (born 1992)

- کیان سلطانی
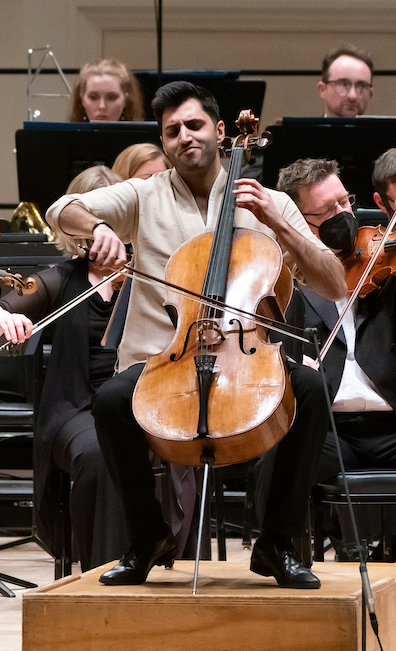
- Soltani plays the Cello Concerto of Edward Elgar with the Royal Philharmonic Orchestra at Carnegie Hall, January 2022
- Born: 3 June 1992 (age 34); Bregenz, Austria
- Citizenship: Austrian
- Occupation: Cellist
- Parent: Farzaneh Navai
- Website: www.kiansoltani.com

Kian Soltani (Persian: کیان سلطانی; born 3 June 1992) is an Austrian-Iranian cellist, born in Bregenz to a family of Iranian musicians. He has held the post of principal cellist in Daniel Barenboim's West-Eastern Divan Orchestra, where he came to prominence performing Beethoven's Triple Concerto on the orchestra's 2015 tour.

He began playing the cello at the age of four and, at age 12 he began his studies with Ivan Monighetti at the Basel Music Academy. He completed his studies as a member of the Young Soloist Programme at the Kronberg Academy in Germany, and the International Music Academy in Liechtenstein. For the 2018–2019 season, he was Artist-in-Residence at the Residentie Orchestra in The Hague.

== Awards and competitions ==
Soltani was awarded the Lucerne Festival's 2017 Credit Suisse Young Artist Award and the Schleswig-Holstein Musik Festival's 2017 Leonard Bernstein Award. He received the Luitpold Prize (German: Luitpoldpreis) of the Festival Kissinger Sommer in 2014. In 2013, he won the first prize at the Paulo Cello Competition in Helsinki, Finland. He has also won the first prize in the Karl Davidoff International Cello Competition in Latvia and the International Cello Competition 'Antonio Janigro' in Croatia, and became a member of the Anne-Sophie Mutter Foundation in 2014.

== Selected recordings ==
Soltani signed an exclusive recording contract with Deutsche Grammophon/Universal Classics in 2017. His debut album Home was released in February 2018, and pairs works by Schubert and Schumann with folk song settings by Reza Vali and Soltani himself. He also accompanied Austrian-Iranian guitarist Mahan Mirarab on his 2026 album Unspoken.

- Soltani, Kian; Schubert, Franz; Schumann, Robert; Vali, Reza; Pilsan, Aaron (2018), Home (in no linguistic content), [Europe], [France]: Universal music. [Universal music France], OCLC 1085384602
