= Social Studies (Carla Bley album) =

Studio album by Carla Bley
- Released: 1981
- Recorded: September–December 1980
- Studio: Grog Kill Studio, Willow, New York
- Genre: Jazz
- Length: 41:16
- Label: Watt/ECM
- Producer: Carla Bley

Carla Bley chronology
Musique Mecanique (1978)	Social Studies (1981)	Live! (1981)

Social Studies is an album by American composer, bandleader and keyboardist Carla Bley, recorded in 1980 and released on the Watt/ECM label in 1981.

== Reception ==
The AllMusic review by Alex Henderson stated: "Bley's risk-taking serves her quite well on Social Studies, an unorthodox and adventurous pearl that is as rewarding as it is cerebral". The Penguin Guide to Jazz awarded the album 3 stars, stating that "Social Studies shouldn't be missed: a bookish cover masks some wonderfully wry music".

Professional ratings
Review scores
Source	Rating
AllMusic	4.5/5 stars
Tom Hull	B+
The Penguin Guide to Jazz	3/4 stars
The Rolling Stone Jazz Record Guide	3/5 stars

== Track listing ==
All compositions by Carla Bley except where noted.

1. "Reactionary Tango (In Three Parts)" (Carla Bley, Steve Swallow) - 12:54
2. "Copyright Royalties" - 6:45
3. "Útviklingssang" - 6:31
4. "Valse Sinistre" - 4:56
5. "Floater" - 5:56
6. "Walking Batteriewoman" - 4:24

== Personnel ==
- Carla Bley - organ, piano
- Michael Mantler - trumpet
- Carlos Ward - alto saxophone, tenor saxophone
- Tony Dagradi - tenor saxophone, clarinet
- Joe Daley - euphonium
- Gary Valente - trombone
- Earl McIntyre - tuba
- Steve Swallow - bass guitar
- D. Sharpe - drums
