= Bin-Jip =

Hungarian band

- Origin: Budapest, Hungary
- Genres: Electronic, Trip hop, Nu jazz, Experimental
- Years active: 2010–present
- Label: Lab6
- Members: Veronika Harcsa; Bálint Gyemant; Andrew J

Bin-Jip is a Hungarian electronic music group, comprising Veronika Harcsa as singer and writer, Bálint Gyémánt as guitarist and Andrew J as producer and DJ.

== History ==
The name "Bin-Jip" ("empty houses”) originates from the South Korean movie of the same name, which is a well-liked movie by the members. The strange story of the movie took place in apartments and rooms showing similarity with the band's history, which was born in Andrew J's living-room. That is where their first songs were written and the musicians create a band.

== Discography ==
Their debut album, Enter, was released in the second half of 2010 by their own label LAB6 in Hungary and by Whereabouts Records in Japan. At this time and during the following tour, Zsolt Kaltenecker was also a member of Bin-Jip. Enter won the Alternative Album of the Year 2011 Fonogram Award in Hungary.

Their second album, Heavy, was released in December 2014.
