= David Helbock =

Austrian jazz musician (born 1984)

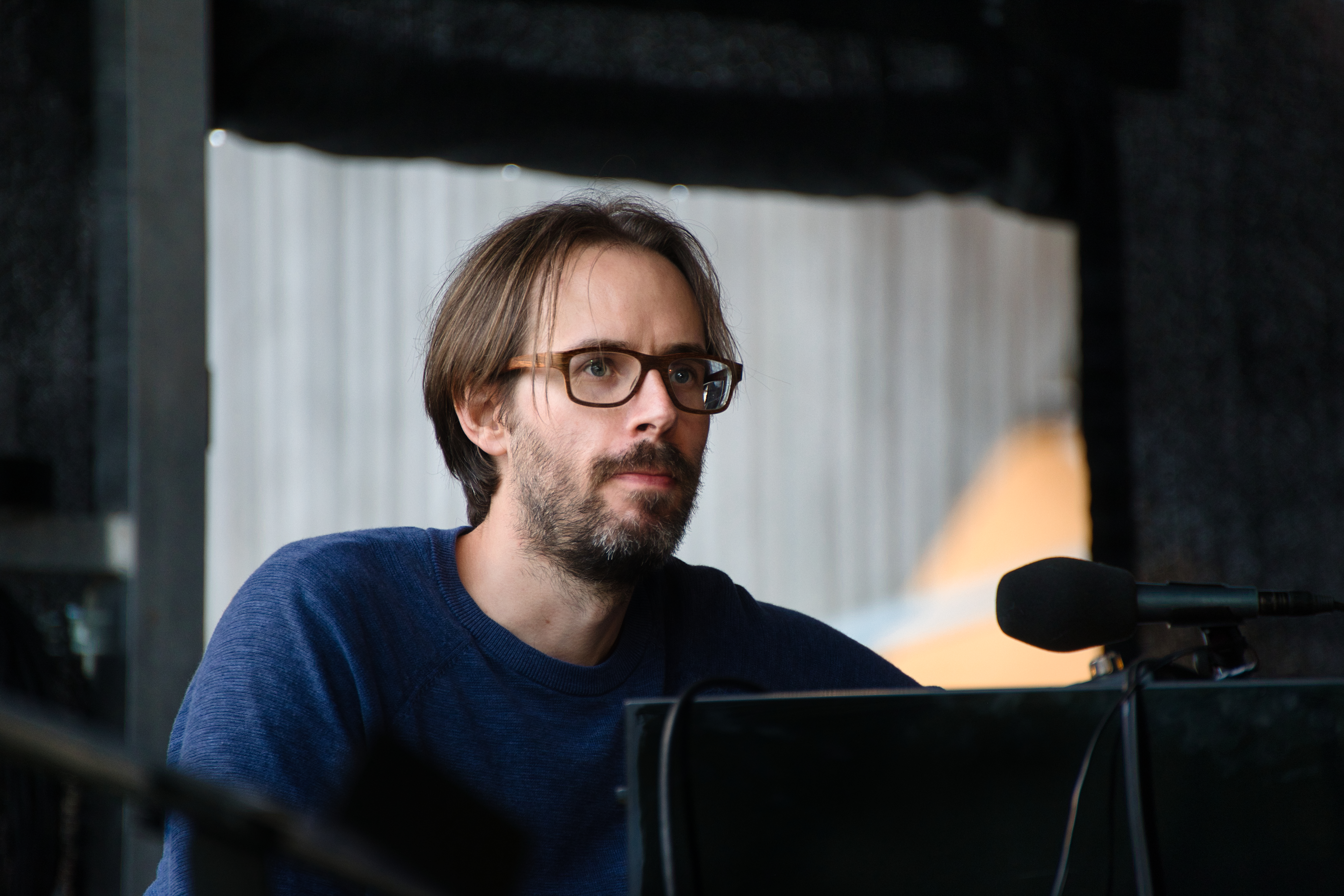
- David Helbock

Background information
- Born: David Helbock; 28 January 1984 (age 42); Koblach, Austria
- Genres: Jazz, Modern Jazz, Jazz fusion
- Occupations: Musician, composer
- Instruments: Piano, Keyboards
- Labels: ACT Music, Traumton Records
- Website: davidhelbock.com

David Helbock (born 28 January 1984 in Koblach) is an Austrian jazz musician.

== Music education ==
Helbock began playing piano at the age of six. After several years of lessons at the music school Feldkirch and at the jazz seminar Dornbirn, he switched to the music high school in Feldkirch in 1998. During school he began to study piano with Ferenc Bognar at the Vorarlberg State Conservatory, where he completed his classical concert diploma in 2005.

Since 2000, Helbock has also taken lessons with the New York jazz pianist Peter Madsen, with whom he also played in his ensemble CIA (Collective of Improvising Artists) and more recently formed the Austrian Syndicate.

== Activities ==
With his different musical projects, like the "David Helbock Trio", "David Helbock's Random/Control" and also as a solo artist, Helbock toured all over the planet.

In 2012, Helbock released Purple, an album on which he only covers songs by Prince, such as 1999, Alphabet St. , Kiss and Purple Rain. In 2014, Helbock appeared as a soloist on Michael Mantler's CD The Jazzcomposers Orchestra – Update, released by ECM Records. He also plays on Mantler's albums Comment c'est (2017), Coda (2021) & Sempre Notte (2024).

Since 2010 till 2015 Helbock's CDs as a leader were published on the label Traumton in Berlin. Since 2016 Helbock is an exclusive artist with the record company ACT Music from Munich. Up to date Helbock released seven albums on ACT – "Into the Mystic" (2016 with the David Helbock Trio), "Tour d´Horizon" (2018 with Random/Control), "Playing John Williams" (2019 – Solopiano), "The New Cool" (2021 with Arne Jansen & Sebastian Studnitzky), "Playground" (2022 with French singer Camille Bertault) and "Austrian Syndicate" (2023 with his former teacher Peter Madsen and an Austrian rhythm section dedicated to Joe Zawinul and featuring guest appearances of Dhafer Youssef, Lakecia Benjamin, Maria João (singer), Fred Wesley & Alex Acuña ). In 2025 Helbock released two albums - a live studio session recorded at the "Little Big Beat Studio" in Liechtenstein feat. his longterm trio "Random/Control" feat. the German singer Fola Dada and also his 7th album for ACT - "Faces of Night" in Duo with young Austrian e-bassist & cellist Julia Hofer and guests like Lorenz Raab, Veronika Harcsa & Mahan Mirarab.

In 2010 he released his "Personal Realbook", a compositional project, where he wrote one tune every day for a whole year, inspired by the Brazilian jazz legend Hermeto Pascoal. Hermeto also contributed a song to Helbock's Album "Think of Two" in 2014.

== Awards ==
Helbock is a prizewinner at the world-biggest Jazzpianosolo Competition in Montreux 2007 and 2010 and also won the audience prize. In 2011 he was awarded the Outstanding Artist Award of the government of Austria.

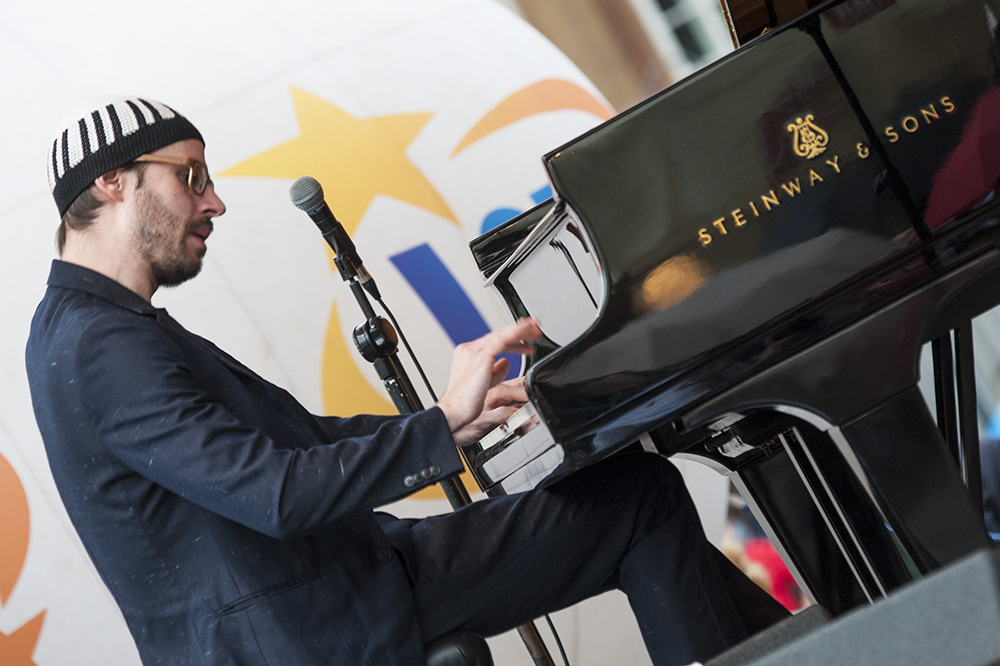
David Helbock on piano during an open-air concert in The Old Town's Square in Warsaw, Poland on 16 July 2016

== Selected discography ==
- 1998: Happiness (Solo)
- 2003: Emotions (Solopiano)
- 2004: Transformation (David Helbock Trio)
- 2006: Celebrating modern Genius (HDV Trio)
- 2007: Time (Solopiano)
- 2008: Suite of Philosophical Sounds – SUN RA (with Peter Madsen's CIA)
- 2008: All In (HDV Trio)
- 2010: My Personal Realbook (Sheet Music)
- 2010: Thousand Miles Journey (with Peter Madsen's CIA)
- 2010: David Helbock's Random/Control
- 2011: Diagonal (Frick/Helbock Duo)
- 2012: Purple (Solopiano)
- 2014: Think of Two (Random/Control)
- 2014: What's Next? I Don't Know! (Raab/Helbock Duo)
- 2014: The Jazzcomposers Orchestra – Update (with Michael Mantler)
- 2015: Mistura (with Peter Madsen)
- 2015: Aural Colors (David Helbock Trio)
- 2016: Into the Mystic (David Helbock Trio)
- 2016: Comment Cést (with Michael Mantler)
- 2018: Tour d´Horizon (Random/Control)
- 2019: Playing John Williams (Solopiano)
- 2021: Coda Orchestra Suites (with Michael Mantler)
- 2021: The New Cool (with Arne Jansen & Sebastian Studnitzky)
- 2022: Playground (with Camille Bertault)
- 2023: Austrian Syndicate (with Peter Madsen, Raphael Preuschl, Herbert Pirker, Claudio Spieler and guests)
- 2024: Sempre Notte (with Michael Mantler)
- 2025: David Helbock´s Random/Control feat. Fola Dada (Little Big Beat Studio Livesession)
- 2025: Faces of Night (David Helbock / Julia Hofer Duo feat. Lorenz Raab, Veronika Harcsa & Mahan Mirarab)
