= Sextet (Carla Bley album) =

Studio album by Carla Bley
- Released: 1987
- Recorded: December 1986 & January 1987
- Studio: Grog Kill Studio, Willow, New York
- Genre: Jazz, jazz fusion
- Length: 40:58
- Label: Watt/ECM
- Producer: Carla Bley

Carla Bley chronology
Night-Glo (1985)	Sextet (1987)	Duets (1988)

Sextet is an album by American composer, bandleader and keyboardist Carla Bley, released on the Watt/ECM label in 1987.

== Reception ==
Professional ratings
Review scores
Source	Rating
AllMusic	3/5 stars
Tom Hull	B+
The Penguin Guide to Jazz	2.5/4 stars

AllMusic's Richard S. Ginell stated: "The sound bathes in a polished golden ambience very much in keeping with a product distributed under the ECM banner". The Penguin Guide to Jazz awarded the album 2½ stars.

== Track listing ==
All compositions by Carla Bley.

1. "More Brahms" - 7:31
2. "Houses and People" - 7:26
3. "The Girl Who Cried Champagne" - 6:08
4. "Brooklyn Bridge" - 6:35
5. "Lawns" - 7:06
6. "Healing Power" - 6:22

== Personnel ==
- Carla Bley - organ, synth bass (track 2)
- Larry Willis - piano
- Hiram Bullock - guitar, bass guitar (track 4)
- Steve Swallow - bass guitar
- Victor Lewis - drums
- Don Alias - percussion
