= Real Book (album) =

Studio album by Steve Swallow
- Released: 1994
- Recorded: December 1993
- Studio: Grog Kill Studio, Willow, NY
- Genre: Jazz
- Length: 49:08
- Label: Xtra Watt 7
- Producer: Steve Swallow

Steve Swallow chronology
Go Together (1992)	Real Book (1994)	Songs with Legs (1994)

Real Book is an album by the bassist Steve Swallow, released on the Xtra Watt label in 1994.

== Reception ==
Professional ratings
Review scores
Source	Rating
AllMusic	4/5 stars
The Penguin Guide to Jazz Recordings	3/4 stars

AllMusic awarded the album 4 stars and the review by Rick Anderson states: "This program finds him showing off his considerable writing chops with the help of an all-star group... His focus on the upper registers and the polyester tone of his five-string bass guitar will continue to annoy those who prefer to hear the bass played dark, low and woody, but there's no denying the consistent inventiveness of his playing or the charm of these compositions".

== Track listing ==
All compositions by Steve Swallow.

1. "Bite Your Grandmother" - 4:40
2. "Second Handy Motion" - 4:47
3. "Wrong Together" - 5:19
4. "Outfits" - 5:52
5. "Thinking Out Loud" - 5:04
6. "Let's Eat" - 5:38
7. "Better Times" - 3:49
8. "Willow" - 4:13
9. "Muddy in the Bank" - 3:20
10. "Ponytail" - 6:26

== Personnel ==
- Steve Swallow - 5 string bass guitar
- Tom Harrell - trumpet, flugelhorn
- Joe Lovano - tenor saxophone
- Mulgrew Miller - piano
- Jack DeJohnette - drums
