= New Music Distribution Service =

American record distributor

- Company type: non profit
- Industry: distributor
- Founded: 1972
- Founder: Carla Bley; Michael Mantler
- Headquarters: New York City

New Music Distribution Service (or NMDS) was a non-profit record distributor based in New York City. It was founded in 1972 by Carla Bley and Michael Mantler as a means of distributing artist produced recordings of, primarily, experimental contemporary music. It was a program of the Jazz Composer's Orchestra Association (JCOA). The NMDS began by distributing recordings released by many different independent labels and artists, including Nodlew (Weldon Irvine's label), Jahari (Richard Dunbar's label), Gibex (Michael William Gilbert's label), Philip Glass's Chatham Square label, and many others. Several international labels such as Incus and ECM were also included in their catalogs. The biggest selling album in NMDS history was the ECM release of Return to Forever (Chick Corea album), which strained the seams at the service and led to ECM's first US major distribution deal.

The service maintained a philosophy of keeping all labels in stock at all times. Carla Bley remembered being rejected by the gatekeepers at traditional record companies and vowed that NMDS would be non-judgemental for the artists.

In 1984, the NMDS was awarded a $10,000 grant by the Robert Sterling Clark Foundation.

Due to the long illness of a manager, and the resultant failure to pay New York state taxes, NMDS suspended operations in 1990.
