= Night-Glo =

Studio album by Carla Bley
- Released: 1985
- Recorded: June–August 1985
- Studio: Grog Kill Studio, Willow, New York
- Genre: Jazz
- Length: 36:22
- Label: Watt/ECM
- Producer: Carla Bley & Steve Swallow

Carla Bley chronology
| Heavy Heart (1983) | Night-Glo (1985) | Sextet (1986) |

Steve Swallow chronology
| Home (1980) | Night-Glo (1985) | Carla (1987) |

Night-Glo is an album by American composer, bandleader and keyboardist Carla Bley, with bassist Steve Swallow, recorded and released on the Watt/ECM label in 1985.

== Reception ==
The AllMusic review by Richard S. Ginell deemed the album "a relaxed, easygoing, easy-listening series of compositions that nearly spills over into fuzak... Bley permits the lazy pina-colada mood to amble undisturbed from track to track". The Penguin Guide to Jazz awarded the album 2½ stars.

Professional ratings
Review scores
| Source | Rating |
|---|---|
| AllMusic | 2.5/5 stars |
| Tom Hull | B− |
| The Penguin Guide to Jazz | 2.5/4 stars |

== Track listing ==
All compositions by Carla Bley.

1. "Pretend You're in Love" - 4:30
2. "Night-Glo" - 6:45
3. "Rut" - 7:37
4. "Crazy With You" - 5:13
5. "Wildlife: Horns/Paws Without Claws/Sex With Birds" - 12:33

== Personnel ==
- Carla Bley - organ, synthesizer
- Steve Swallow - bass guitar
- Randy Brecker - trumpet, flugelhorn
- Paul McCandless - oboe, english horn, bass clarinet, soprano saxophone, tenor saxophone, baritone saxophone
- John Clark - french horn
- Tom Malone - trombone
- David Taylor - bass trombone
- Larry Willis - piano, electric piano
- Hiram Bullock - guitar
- Victor Lewis - drums
- Manolo Badrena - percussion
