= Live! (Carla Bley album) =

Live album by Carla Bley
- Released: 1982
- Recorded: August 19–21, 1981
- Venue: Great American Music Hall, San Francisco, California
- Genre: Jazz
- Length: 41:39
- Label: Watt/ECM
- Producer: Carla Bley

Carla Bley chronology
Social Studies (1980)	Live! (1982)	I Hate to Sing (1981–83)

Live! is a live album by American composer, bandleader and keyboardist Carla Bley, recorded at the Great American Music Hall in 1981 and released on the Watt/ECM label in 1982.

== Reception ==
Critical reaction to the album is generally positive but varies. The AllMusic review by Brian Olewnick stated: "Listeners looking for prime Carla Bley would do better to search out her earlier, far more adventurous and creative work". The Penguin Guide to Jazz awarded the album 3½ stars and stated: "Live! is a treat, representing one of the finest performances by her and Mantler on record".

Professional ratings
Review scores
Source	Rating
AllMusic	3/5 stars
The Penguin Guide to Jazz	3.5/4 stars
Tom Hull	A−

== Track listing ==
All compositions by Carla Bley.

1. "Blunt Object" - 5:10
2. "The Lord Is Listenin' to Ya, Hallelujah!" - 7:24
3. "Time and Us" - 7:59
4. "Still in the Room" - 9:06
5. "Real Life Hits" - 4:26
6. "Song Sung Long" - 7:30

== Personnel ==
- Carla Bley - organ, glockenspiel, piano (track 3)
- Michael Mantler - trumpet
- Steve Slagle - alto saxophone, soprano saxophone, flute
- Tony Dagradi - tenor saxophone
- Vincent Chancey - French horn
- Gary Valente - trombone
- Earl McIntyre - tuba, bass trombone
- Arturo O'Farrill - piano, organ (track 3)
- Steve Swallow - bass guitar
- D. Sharpe - drums
