= Dinner Music =

Studio album by Carla Bley
- Released: 1977
- Recorded: July–September 1976
- Studio: Grog Kill Studio, Willow, New York
- Genre: Jazz
- Length: 48:09
- Label: Watt/ECM
- Producer: Carla Bley and George James

Carla Bley chronology
Tropic Appetites (1974)	Dinner Music (1977)	European Tour 1977 (1977)

Dinner Music is an album by American composer, bandleader and keyboardist Carla Bley, recorded in 1976 and released on the Watt/ECM label in 1977.

== Reception ==
Professional ratings
Review scores
Source	Rating
AllMusic	4.5/5 stars
Christgau's Record Guide	B+
Tom Hull	B+
The Penguin Guide to Jazz	3/4 stars
The Rolling Stone Jazz Record Guide	3/5 stars

The AllMusic review by Michael G. Nastos stated: "First excursion on a funky trail, executed immaculately. Near essential".

== Track listing ==
All compositions by Carla Bley except where noted.

1. "Sing Me Softly of the Blues" – 7:43
2. "Dreams So Real" – 5:36
3. "Ad Infinitum" – 5:54
4. "Dining Alone" (lyrics by Bley & John Hunt) – 4:36
5. "Song Sung Long" – 6:02
6. "Ida Lupino" – 7:57
7. "Funnybird Song" – 3:05
8. "A New Hymn" – 7:25

== Personnel ==
- Carla Bley – organ, piano, tenor saxophone, vocals
- Michael Mantler – trumpet
- Carlos Ward – alto saxophone, tenor saxophone, flute
- Roswell Rudd – trombone
- Bob Stewart – tuba
- Richard Tee – piano, electric piano
- Cornell Dupree (tracks 1 & 7), Eric Gale, (tracks 2, 4 & 6) – guitar
- Gordon Edwards – bass guitar
- Steve Gadd – drums
