= Mahan Mirarab =

Austrian-Iranian musician, born 1983

Mahan Mirarab ماهان میرعرب
- Born: 1983 (age 42–43); Tehran, Iran
- Genres: Jazz, World music
- Occupations: Musician, composer
- Instruments: Guitar, tar, oud
- Years active: 2010–present
- Label: ACT Music
- Website: www.mahanmirarab.com

Mahan Mirarab (Persian: ماهان میرعرب, born 1983) is an Iranian musician (guitar, tar, oud, vocals, composition) living in Vienna, Austria. He is known for his interpretations blending Iranian traditional music with European chamber music, world music and contemporary jazz.

== Life and career ==
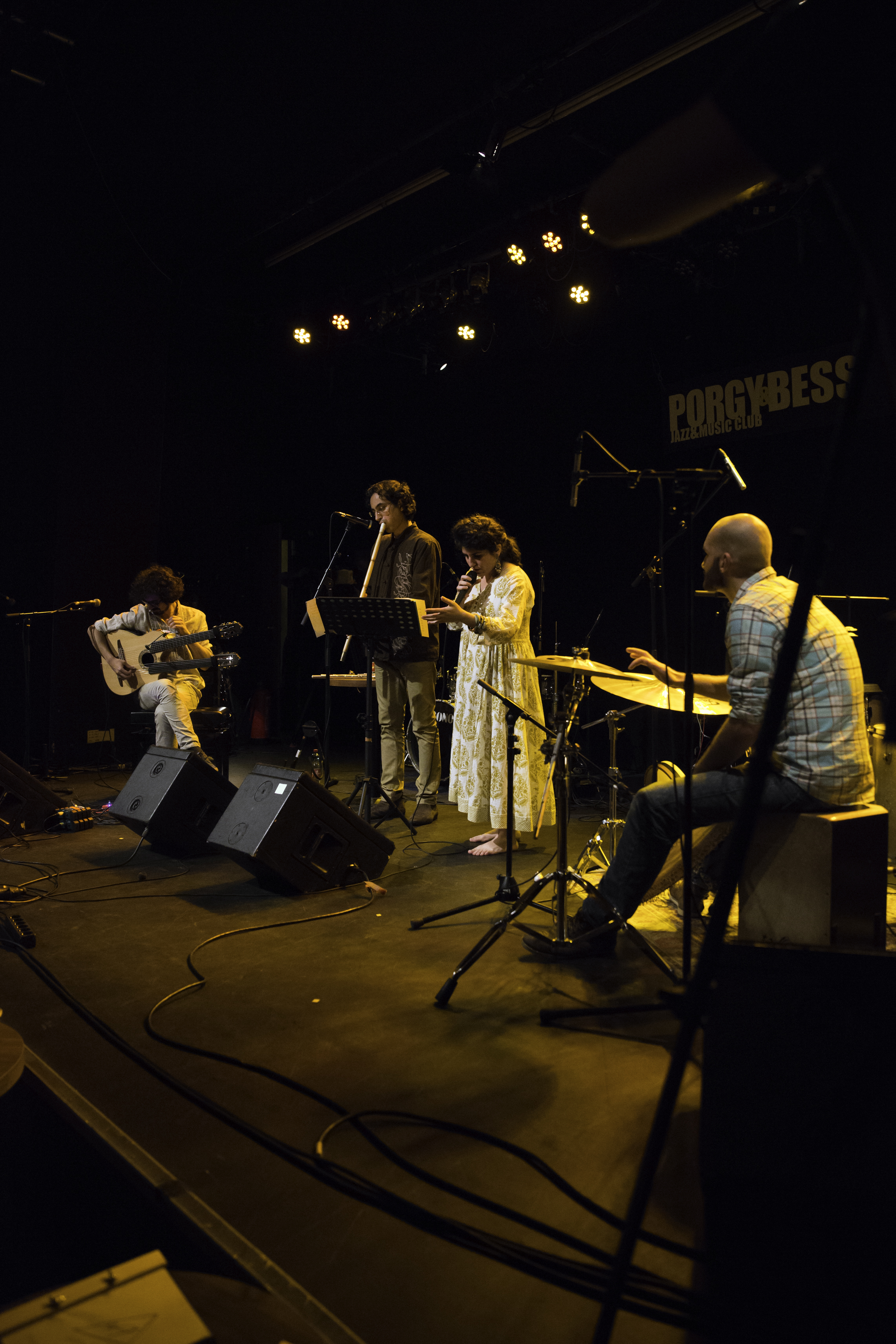
Mahan Mirarab Band at the Austrian World Music Awards 2015

Mirarab grew up in Tehran and, as a teenager, studied both Iranian music as well as the musical cultures of the Arabs, Turks and Kurds. Among other influences, he studied jazz improvisation in a workshop with Armenian jazz pianist Vahagn Hayrapetyan. He also studied architecture at the University of Tehran.

Mirarab moved to Vienna in 2009 and began playing on a custom-made double-neck guitar both with traditional frets and a frettless fingerboard. He started his own band with Golnar Shahyar (vocals, guitar), Kaveh Sarvarian (flute), Haggai Cohen-Milo (bass) and Amir Wahba (percussion), which he later expanded into a septet.

=== Performances and albums ===
In addition to concerts in Austria, Mirarab has performed in the Pierre Boulez Saal, Berlin, the Cultural Center Bozart, Brussels, at festivals in London and Slovakia and at the Morgenland Festival Osnabrück.

With Golnar Shahyar and percussionist Shayan Fathi, Mirarab founded the world music trio Sehrang and released the album Dar Lahze in 2014, inspired by Iranian music. At the Jazzfest Berlin 2019, he shared the stage with American jazz musician Anthony Braxton and numerous other musicians. In March 2024, he performed his composition Say Your Most Beautiful Word in Duisburg.

Mirarab also has worked as a composer for stage and film music. In April 2025, his music for Romabaron – No Z***** Baron, a free interpretation of Johann Strauss’s operetta The Gypsy Baron was performed at Tanzquartier Wien.

== Recognition and awards ==
- Austrian World Music Awards 2015, finalist with his Mahan Mirarab Band
- Austrian Jazz Award 2025, Live Act 2025, 3rd winner

== Discography ==
=== with his trio formations ===
- Persian Side of Jazz, 2010
- Choub, 2013
- Dar Lahze, 2014
- Derakht, 2017
- Say Your Most Beautiful Word, 2022

=== with Kian Soltani, Golnar Shahyar and Lars Danielsson ===
- Unspoken, ACT Music, 2026

== Reception ==
Mirarab has been described by Austrian public radio OE1 to have embarked on “a sound expedition that presents a colourful mixture of rhythms and harmonies, as well as a rich musical vocabulary and profound knowledge of various musical styles.“ Commenting on Mirarab’s music for a concert in Brussels, the Austrian Cultural Forum wrote: “He represents a generation of young musicians with a migrant background in Europe who are changing the sound boundaries in the music industry.“

In May 2011, All About Jazz magazine remarked "Mirarab's enigmatic, transcendent guitar playing, fusing Middle Eastern textures with traditional jazz rhythms".

On the release of his 2026 album Unspoken, where he was accompanied by Kian Soltani, Golnar Shahyar and Lars Danielsson, World Music Central noted an influence by Austrian jazz fusion composer Joe Zawinul, and called the tune Jina a memory of the killing of Jina Mahsa Amini in Iran. On 13 June 2026, Austrian public radio broadcast an interview with Mirarab, speaking about his latest album, his life and career.
