= Veronika Harcsa =

Hungarian singer (born 1982)

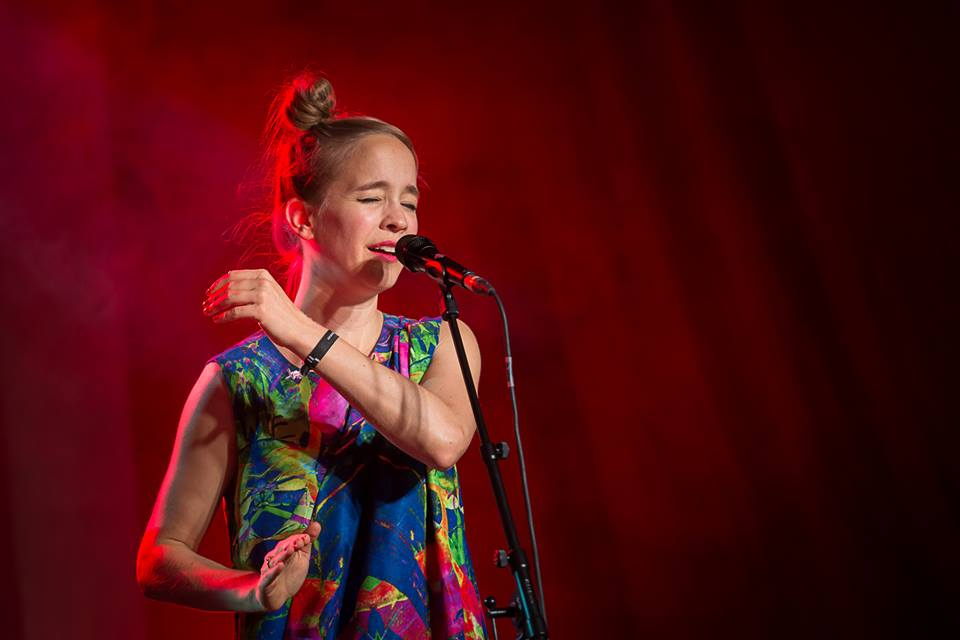
- Harcsa at Cosmopolite in Oslo, 2017

Background information
- Born: October 8, 1982 (age 44); Budapest, Hungary
- Genres: Jazz, alternative rock
- Occupation: Singer
- Years active: 2005–present
- Website: www.harcsaveronika.hu

Veronika Harcsa (born October 8, 1982, in Budapest, Hungary) is a Hungarian jazz singer and songwriter, known to be active in various musical genres. She has received the Hungarian Music Award for Best Jazz Album and Best Alternative Album.

== Career ==
Harcsa began studying at Budapest University of Technology and Economics before switching to the Liszt Academy of Music, graduating in 2008. She earned her master's degree in 2014 from the Royal Conservatory of Brussels.

Her current main project is a duo with guitar player Balint Gyémánt. The duo attended the 2015 Jazzahead! meeting in Europe. Their second album, Tell Her, was released on Traumton Records in February 2017 to critical acclaim.

Veronika founded her first jazz band, a quartet, in 2005. Between 2006 and 2011, the group released four albums, two of which reached the top of the vocal jazz charts at Tower Records in Japan. Alongside her jazz career, she has gained success within the alternative music scene in Hungary, collaborating with the Erik Sumo Band and the Pannonia Allstars Ska Orchestra. She also featured on two albums of the experimental electronic trio Bin-Jip and in a musical and literary project based on works by the Hungarian avant-garde poet Lajos Kassák. She was awarded "Best Voice of Budapest Fringe" at the Budapest Fringe Festival in 2007.

In 2014, she became a permanent artist-in-residence at the Valley of Arts Festival in Kapolcs, Hungary, where she is responsible for the jazz program of the ten-day annual festival.

In 2014–15, Harcsa ran a monthly concert series in Berlin, presenting guest musicians from the local scene, including David Friedman, Julia Hülsmann, Samuel Blaser and David Helbock. In 2025 the album "Faces of Night" by David Helbock & Julia Hofer on ACT Music was released with Harcsa as a guest.

Harcsa has performed at festivals and clubs in over 25 countries worldwide. She has collaborated with Erik Truffaz, Enrico Pieranunzi, Kris Defoort, Nicola Conte, the Franz Liszt Chamber Orchestra, Concerto Budapest and many others.

== Discography ==
- Harcsa Veronika: Speak Low (2005 self release HU and 2007 Nature Bliss, Japan)
- Harcsa Veronika: You Don't Know It's You (2008 self release HU and Nature Bliss, Japan)
- Harcsa Veronika: Red Baggage (2009 self release HU and Nature Bliss, Japan)
- Bin-Jip: Enter (2010 LAB6 Records HU and Whereabouts Records, Japan)
- Harcsa Veronika: Lámpafény (2011 self release HU and Whereabouts Records, Japan)
- Harcsa Veronika – Gyémánt Bálint: Lifelover (2014 Traumton Records)
- Bin-Jip: Live at the Planetarium (DVD and Blu-ray, 2014 self release HU)
- Bin-Jip: Heavy (2014 LAB6 Records HU and Whereabouts Records, Japan)
- Harcsa/Keszég/Márkos/Benkő/Pándi: Kassák (2015 self release HU)
- Harcsa Veronika – Gyémánt Bálint: Tell Her (2017 Traumton Records)

== Awards and nominations ==
Year	Award	Category	Result
2007	Budapest Fringe Festival	Best Voice	Won
2009	Fonogram Awards	Best Jazz Album of the Year – You Don't Know It's You	Won
2009	40th Hungarian Film Week	Best Original Score – Lost Times (with Albert Márkos)	Won
2011	Fonogram Awards	Best Alternative Album of the Year – Bin-Jip: Enter	Won
2014	Balcony TV	Video of the Month – Bin-Jip: Noway Boy (selected by the New York editors)	Won

== See also ==
- Hungarian alternative
- Pannonia Allstars Ska Orchestra
- Bin-Jip
