= Duets (Carla Bley & Steve Swallow album) =

Studio album by Carla Bley & Steve Swallow
- Released: November 7, 1988
- Recorded: Summer 1988
- Genre: Jazz
- Length: 54:52
- Label: Watt/ECM
- Producer: Carla Bley, Steve Swallow

Carla Bley chronology
| Sextet (1986) | Duets (1988) | Fleur Carnivore (1988) |

Steve Swallow chronology
| Carla (1987) | Duets (1988) | Swallow (1991) |

Duets is an album by American composer, bandleader and keyboardist Carla Bley with bassist Steve Swallow recorded and released on the Watt/ECM label in 1988.

== Reception ==
The Allmusic review by David Nelson McCarthy awarded the album 4½ stars and stated that "their tremendous musical rapport and precise wit are really beautiful. It comes highly recommended". The Penguin Guide to Jazz awarded it 3 stars, stating that it is "an entertaining album and an ideal primer on Bley's compositional and improvising techniques".

Professional ratings
Review scores
| Source | Rating |
|---|---|
| Allmusic | 4.5/5 stars |
| Penguin Guide to Jazz | 3/4 stars |

== Track listing ==
All compositions by Carla Bley except where noted.

1. "Baby Baby" - 6:28
2. "Walking Batteriewoman" - 4:01
3. "Útviklingssang" - 4:42
4. "Ladies in Mercedes" (Steve Swallow) - 5:44
5. "Romantic Notions No. 3" - 7:02
6. "Remember" (Swallow) - 5:24
7. "Ups and Downs" - 6:16
8. "Reactionary Tango (In Three Parts)" (Bley, Swallow) - 8:44
9. "Soon I Will Be Done With the Troubles of This World" (Traditional) - 6:58

Recorded at Grog Kill Studio, Willow, New York in the Summer of 1988.

== Personnel ==
- Carla Bley - piano
- Steve Swallow - bass guitar
