= Michael Mantler =

Austrian jazz trumpeter and composer

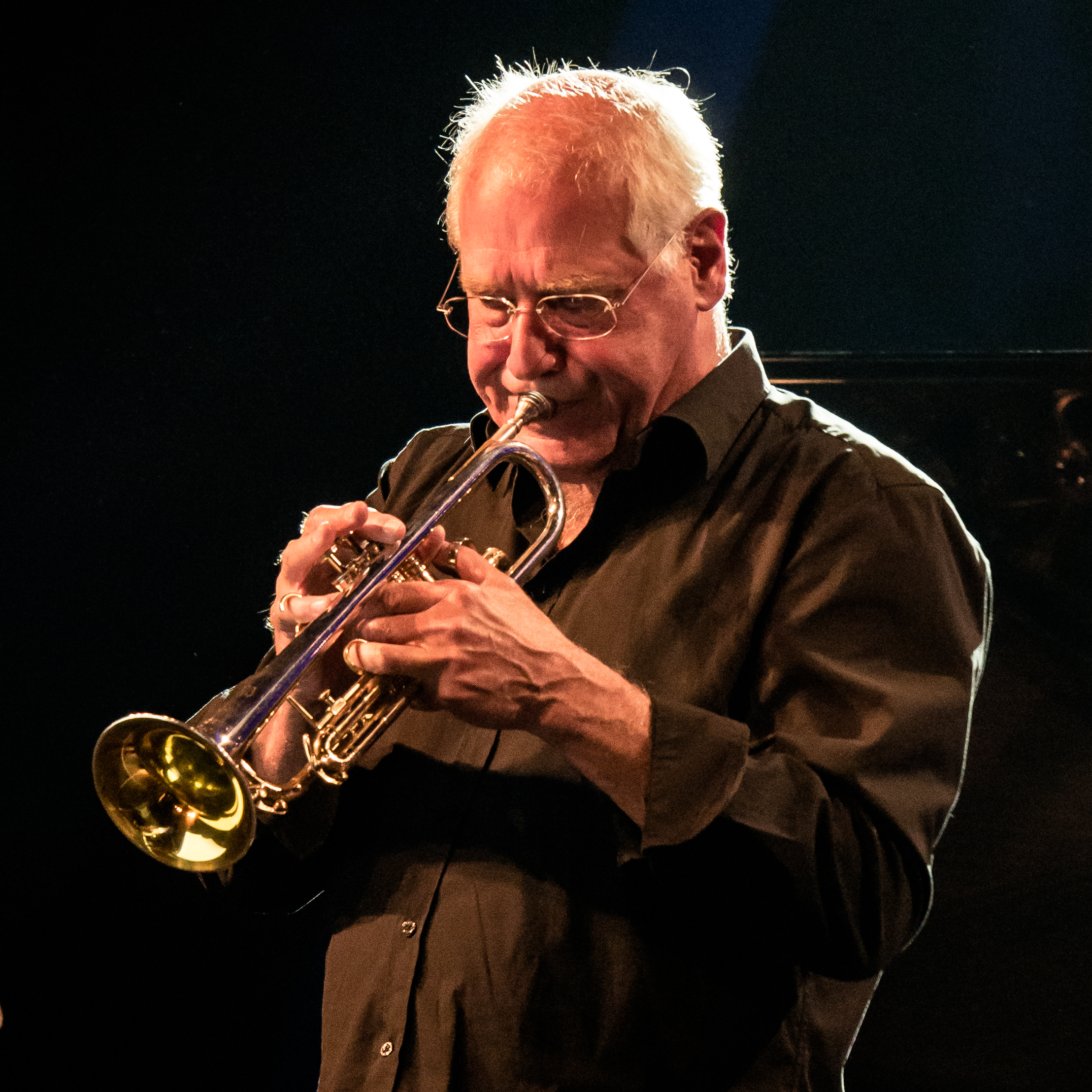
- Michael Mantler at the Moers Festival, Moers, Germany, 2015

Background information
- Born: August 10, 1943 (age 83); Vienna, Austria
- Genres: Avant-garde jazz, contemporary music
- Occupations: Composer, musician
- Instrument: Trumpet
- Years active: 1964–present
- Labels: JCOA, WATT, ECM
- Website: www.mantlermusic.com

Michael Mantler (born August 10, 1943) is an Austrian avant-garde jazz trumpeter and composer of contemporary music.

== Career: United States ==
Mantler was born in Vienna, Austria. In the early 1960s, he was a student at the Academy of Music and Vienna University, concentrating on trumpet and musicology. He continued his studies at the Berklee School of Music in Boston, Massachusetts, United States. In 1964, he moved to New York City and joined the Jazz Composers Guild with Roswell Rudd, Archie Shepp, and Cecil Taylor. He founded the Jazz Realities quintet with Carla Bley and toured in Europe with Steve Lacy. After the Guild broke up, he established the Jazz Composer's Orchestra Association (JCOA). Its purpose was to provide an outlet for new orchestral jazz compositions. For its first record release he produced a double album of his music during 1968, entitled The Jazz Composer's Orchestra, with soloists Cecil Taylor, Don Cherry, Roswell Rudd, Pharoah Sanders, Larry Coryell, and Gato Barbieri. Some of this music was also performed during the "Long Concerts" at the Electric Circus in New York in 1969.

The problems of independently distributing the orchestra's record label, led him to form the New Music Distribution Service (as a division of JCOA) in 1972, an organization which was to serve many independent labels for almost twenty years. Mantler and Bley started their own company, WATT Records, which was a record label, recording studio, and music publisher. By the mid 1970s, both orchestra and distributor discontinued their activities.

Mantler recorded many solo albums with varying instrumentation and personnel, emphasizing his work as a composer rather than as a band leader. Appearing live infrequently, he concentrated on composing and recording. He recorded Something There with the string section of the London Symphony Orchestra and several albums using the words of writers Samuel Beckett (No Answer), Harold Pinter (Silence), and Edward Gorey (The Hapless Child).

Reviewing Mantler's 1978 Movies LP in Christgau's Record Guide, Robert Christgau wrote, "Great title for the ultimate soundtrack demo, utilizing the chops and sound of Larry Coryell, Tony Williams, Steve Swallow, and Carla Bley on bracing (if rather detached) compositions that unite the conventions of jazz group writing with those of twentieth-century European music. Sticks to the ribs."

Commissions and performances with European orchestras followed, at the Danish Radio, the Swedish Radio, the North and West German Radio, and the Lille Opera. His 1987 album Many Have No Speech contained songs in English, German, and French that were based on the poetry of Samuel Beckett, Ernst Meister, and Philippe Soupault, with vocals by rock musicians Jack Bruce, Marianne Faithfull, and Robert Wyatt.

From 1977 until 1985, he was also a member of the Carla Bley Band, touring extensively throughout Europe, the US, and Japan, as well as appearing on all of the Band's recordings. Mantler and Bley were married from 1965 –1991 and had one daughter, Karen Mantler, who became a musician.

== Career: Europe ==
In 1991, he left the United States and moved to Europe, dividing his time between Copenhagen, Denmark and the South of France.

A new orchestral piece was commissioned by the Austrian Donau Festival, and was premièred near Vienna in June 1991 by the Nö.Tonkünstlerorchester, conducted by Michael Gibbs, with Andy Sheppard as soloist. New compositions were also commissioned by the Danish Radio Big Band and the North German Radio Big Band in Hamburg.

During 1992, Mantler recorded a new album, titled Folly Seeing All This, released by ECM Records in March 1993, which features the Balanescu Quartet plus other instrumentalists. The album includes instrumental compositions and one song, music set to Samuel Beckett's last work written shortly before his death in 1989, the poem "What Is the Word" featuring the voice of Jack Bruce.

In 1993, he formed the Chamber Music and Songs ensemble, featuring his trumpet plus Mona Larsen (voice), Bjarne Roupé (guitar), Kim Kristensen (keyboards), and a string quartet consisting of Marianne Sørensen (violin), Mette Winther (viola), Gunnar Lychou (viola), and Helle Sørensen (cello). Its premiere took place at the Copenhagen Jazzhouse in September, followed by a studio production at Denmark Radio.

Cerco un Paese Innocente, a "Suite of Songs and Interludes for Voice, Untypical Big Band, and Chamber Ensemble", with words by the Italian poet Giuseppe Ungaretti, had its premiere in concert at Denmark Radio in January 1994. Featured were the voice of Mona Larsen, Mantler's ensemble, and the Danish Radio Big Band, conducted by Ole Kock Hansen. The work was subsequently recorded in the studio and released by ECM Records in 1995.

The School of Understanding ("sort-of-an-opera") had its première in August 1996 at Arken, the new Museum of Modern Art in Copenhagen. Participants included singers Jack Bruce, Mona Larsen, Susi Hyldgaard, John Greaves, Don Preston, Karen Mantler, Per Jørgensen, and Robert Wyatt. The recording was released as a double-CD by ECM in November 1997, followed by a new live production at the Hebbel Theater in Berlin.

His One Symphony, commissioned by the broadcaster Hessischer Rundfunk, was premiered in November 1998 by the Radio Symphony Orchestra Frankfurt, conducted by Peter Rundel. The recording of the work was released in February 2000, together with previously recorded material featuring Mona Larsen and the Chamber Music and Songs ensemble interpreting songs set to texts by Ernst Meister.

Hide and Seek, an album of songs with words by Paul Auster (from his play by the same name) for chamber orchestra and the voices of Robert Wyatt and Susi Hyldgaard, was released in March 2001. Theatrical productions of the work, conceived by Rolf Heim (who has previously worked with Mantler on the School of Understanding performances), were produced in the Spring of 2002 in Copenhagen (Kanonhallen, February) and Berlin (Hebbel Theater, March).

His Concerto for Marimba and Vibraphone (commissioned by Portuguese percussionist Pedro Carneiro in 2001) premiered at the Hessischer Rundfunk in March 2005 with the Radio Symphony Orchestra Frankfurt conducted by Pascal Rophé.

During September 2006, Porgy & Bess in Vienna presented a series of retrospective portrait concerts with his Chamber Music and Songs ensemble

In recognition of his life's work he received several Austrian awards: the State Prize for Improvised Music, the Prandtauer Prize of the City of St. Pölten, where he spent his early youth, and the Music Prize of the City of Vienna.

The anthology Review (recordings 1968 – 2000), released by ECM in 2006, traced his musical path during more than 30 years of recordings for JCOA, WATT, and ECM.

He appeared at the JazzFest Berlin in November 2007 with his Concertos project, featuring the Kammerensemble Neue Musik Berlin under the direction of Roland Kluttig. A studio recording of the concertos with soloists Bjarne Roupé (guitar), Bob Rockwell (tenor saxophone), Roswell Rudd (trombone), Pedro Carneiro (marimba and vibraphone), Majella Stockhausen (piano), Nick Mason (percussion), and Mantler on trumpet, was released by ECM during November 2008.

His next CD (For Two), a series of duets for guitar (Bjarne Roupé) and piano (Per Salo), was released by ECM during June 2011.

New works were commissioned and performed by the Max Brand Ensemble, conducted by Christoph Cech (Chamber Music Eight, Tage der Neuen Musik, Krems, Austria, 2012) and by the Chaos Orchestra, conducted by Arnaud Petit (Oiseaux de Guerre, featuring singer Himiko Paganotti, Forum Blanc-Mesnil, France, 2014).

During September 2013, Porgy & Bess in Vienna presented his Jazz Composer's Orchestra Update project, featuring the Nouvelle Cuisine Big Band, conducted by Christoph Cech, with soloists Michael Mantler (trumpet), Harry Sokal and Wolfgang Puschnig (saxophones), Bjarne Roupé (guitar), David Helbock (piano) and the radio.string.quartet.vienna. The program included a complete re-working of all the pieces from the original 1968 The Jazz Composer's Orchestra album, as well as of older material from as early as 1963, never before performed or recorded. A selection of recordings from these performances was released by ECM Records during November 2014. The complete project was performed live several times during 2015/16: at the Moers Festival and at the North Sea Jazz Festival in Rotterdam (with the Nouvelle Cuisine Big Band) and at the German Jazzfestival Frankfurt (with the hr-Bigband), as well as in Portugal at the Lisbon Jazz em Agosto Festival (with the Orquestra Jazz de Matosinhos)

Comment c'est (How It Is), a song cycle for voice (Himiko Paganotti) and chamber orchestra (the Max Brand Ensemble) was premiered with two concerts at Porgy & Bess in Vienna during September 2016. A studio recording of the work was released by ECM Records during November 2017.

With the subsequent project, the Orchestra Suites, he continued working on further orchestral reinterpretations of older works, very selectively choosing material for more "updates" of different musics that were particularly dear to him. The result was a series of suites (HideSeek, Alien, Cerco, Folly, TwoThirteen) for a larger orchestra, conducted by Christoph Cech, presented and recorded at three concerts during September 2019, again at Vienna's Porgy & Bess. The resulting album, CODA - Orchestra Suites, as well as a series of print editions (including engraved and facsimile scores of selected recorded work from a 50-year period), were released in July 2021 by ECM Records.

The compositions from his Concertos album were performed September 2021 in Vienna and again in Graz at the Big Band Bang Festival in 2022, with the Janus Ensemble and soloists, conducted by Christoph Cech.

Songs for bass clarinet (Gareth Davis) and trumpet soloists, vocal and brass ensembles and percussion, with texts by Samuel Beckett, Ernst Meister, Giuseppe Ungaretti and Michael Mantler, were premiered October 2022 at the Jazz Goes to Town festival at Hradec Králové in the Czech Republic, followed by a repeat performance at Porgy & Bess in Vienna.

The New Songs Ensemble featuring John Greaves (voice), Annie Barbazza (voice), Michael Mantler (trumpet), Gareth Davis (bass clarinet), Bjarne Roupé (guitar), David Helbock (piano) and the radio.string.quartet - Bernie Mallinger (violin), Igmar Jenner (violin), Cynthia Liao (viola), Sophie Abraham (cello) - performed new versions of the same songs at Porgy & Bess in Vienna during September 2023. At that occasion Mantler was awarded the Austrian Cross of Honour for Science and Art, First Class. A recording of this concert was released on CD (Sempre Notte - Live Songs) by Dark Companion Records in September 2024. Additional performances by the New Songs ensemble took place during 2024/25 in Vienna, Piacenza, Siena, and Rome.

A new work, Music for Strings, Piano & Bass Clarinet, was premiered at Porgy & Bess September 2025, featuring David Helbock and Gareth Davis.

== Discography ==
=== As composer or leader ===
- 1966: Communication (Fontana) Jazz Composer's Orchestra
- 1966: Jazz Realities (Fontana) with Steve Lacy and Carla Bley
- 1968: The Jazz Composer's Orchestra (JCOA/ECM) with Cecil Taylor, Don Cherry, Pharoah Sanders, Larry Coryell, Roswell Rudd, and Gato Barbieri
- 1974: No Answer (Watt/ECM) with Don Cherry, Jack Bruce, Carla Bley; words by Samuel Beckett
- 1975: 13 (Watt/ECM) for two orchestras and piano
- 1976: The Hapless Child (Watt/ECM) with Robert Wyatt, Terje Rypdal, Carla Bley, Jack DeJohnette, Steve Swallow; settings of written works by Edward Gorey
- 1977: Silence (Watt/ECM) with Robert Wyatt, Kevin Coyne, Chris Spedding; words by Harold Pinter
- 1978: Movies (Watt/ECM) with Larry Coryell, Steve Swallow, and Tony Williams
- 1980: More Movies (Watt/ECM) with Philip Catherine, Steve Swallow, and Gary Windo
- 1983: Something There (Watt/ECM) with Nick Mason, Mike Stern, Michael Gibbs, and the London Symphony Orchestra strings
- 1985: Alien (Watt/ECM) with Don Preston
- 1987: Live (Watt/ECM) with Jack Bruce, Rick Fenn, Don Preston, John Greaves, and Nick Mason
- 1988: Many Have No Speech (Watt/ECM) with Jack Bruce, Marianne Faithfull, Robert Wyatt, Rick Fenn, the Danish Radio Concert Orchestra; words by Samuel Beckett, Ernst Meister, and Philippe Soupault
- 1990: The Watt Works Family Album (WATT/ECM) sampler
- 1993: Folly Seeing All This (ECM) with the Balanescu Quartet, Rick Fenn, and Jack Bruce; words by Samuel Beckett
- 1995: Cerco Un Paese Innocente (ECM) with Mona Larsen, Chamber Ensemble, and the Danish Radio Big Band; words by Giuseppe Ungaretti
- 1997: The School of Understanding (opera) (ECM) with Jack Bruce, Mona Larsen, Susi Hyldgaard, John Greaves, Don Preston, Karen Mantler, Per Jørgensen, Robert Wyatt, chamber ensemble, strings of the Danish Radio Concert Orchestra, conducted by Giordano Bellincampi; words by Michael Mantler
- 2000: Songs and One Symphony (ECM) with Mona Larsen plus Chamber Ensemble and the Radio Symphony Orchestra Frankfurt, conducted by Peter Rundel; words by Ernst Meister
- 2001: Hide and Seek (ECM) with Robert Wyatt, Susi Hyldgaard, and chamber ensemble; words by Paul Auster
- 2006: Review (ECM) 22 track compilation of recordings 1968 - 2000
- 2008: Concertos (ECM) with Michael Mantler, Bjarne Roupé, Bob Rockwell, Roswell Rudd, Pedro Carneiro, Majella Stockhausen, Nick Mason, Kammerensemble Neue Musik Berlin, conducted by Roland Kluttig
- 2011: For Two (ECM) with Bjarne Roupé and Per Salo
- 2014: Jazz Composer's Orchestra Update (ECM) with Michael Mantler, Bjarne Roupé, Harry Sokal, Wolfgang Puschnig, radio.string.quartet.vienna, David Helbock, Nouvelle Cuisine Big Band, conducted by Christoph Cech
- 2017: Comment c'est (ECM) with Michael Mantler, Himiko Paganotti, Max Brand Ensemble, conducted by Christoph Cech; words by Michael Mantler
- 2021: Coda - Orchestra Suites (ECM) with Michael Mantler, Bjarne Roupé, David Helbock, orchestra conducted by Christoph Cech
- 2024: Sempre Notte (Dark Companion Records) — with Michael Mantler, John Greaves, Annie Barbazza, Bjarne Roupé, Gareth Davis, the New Songs Ensemble.

=== With Carla Bley ===
- 1971: Escalator over the Hill
- 1974: Tropic Appetites
- 1977: Dinner Music
- 1978: European Tour 1977
- 1979: Musique Mecanique
- 1981: Social Studies
- 1982: Live!
- 1983: Mortelle Randonnée (PolyGram)
- 1984: I Hate to Sing
- 1984: Heavy Heart

Contributions to Tribute Albums

- 1981: Amarcord Nino Rota (Hannibal)
- 1984: That's the Way I Feel Now (A&M)

=== With others ===
- 1969: A Genuine Tong Funeral, Gary Burton (RCA)
- 1970: Liberation Music Orchestra, Charlie Haden and the Liberation Music Orchestra (Impulse!)
- 1976: Kew. Rhone., John Greaves and Peter Blegvad (Virgin)
- 1981: Nick Mason's Fictitious Sports, Nick Mason (Harvest)
- 1983: The Ballad of the Fallen Charlie Haden and the Liberation Music Orchestra (ECM)
