= Carla Bley =

American jazz composer (1936–2023)

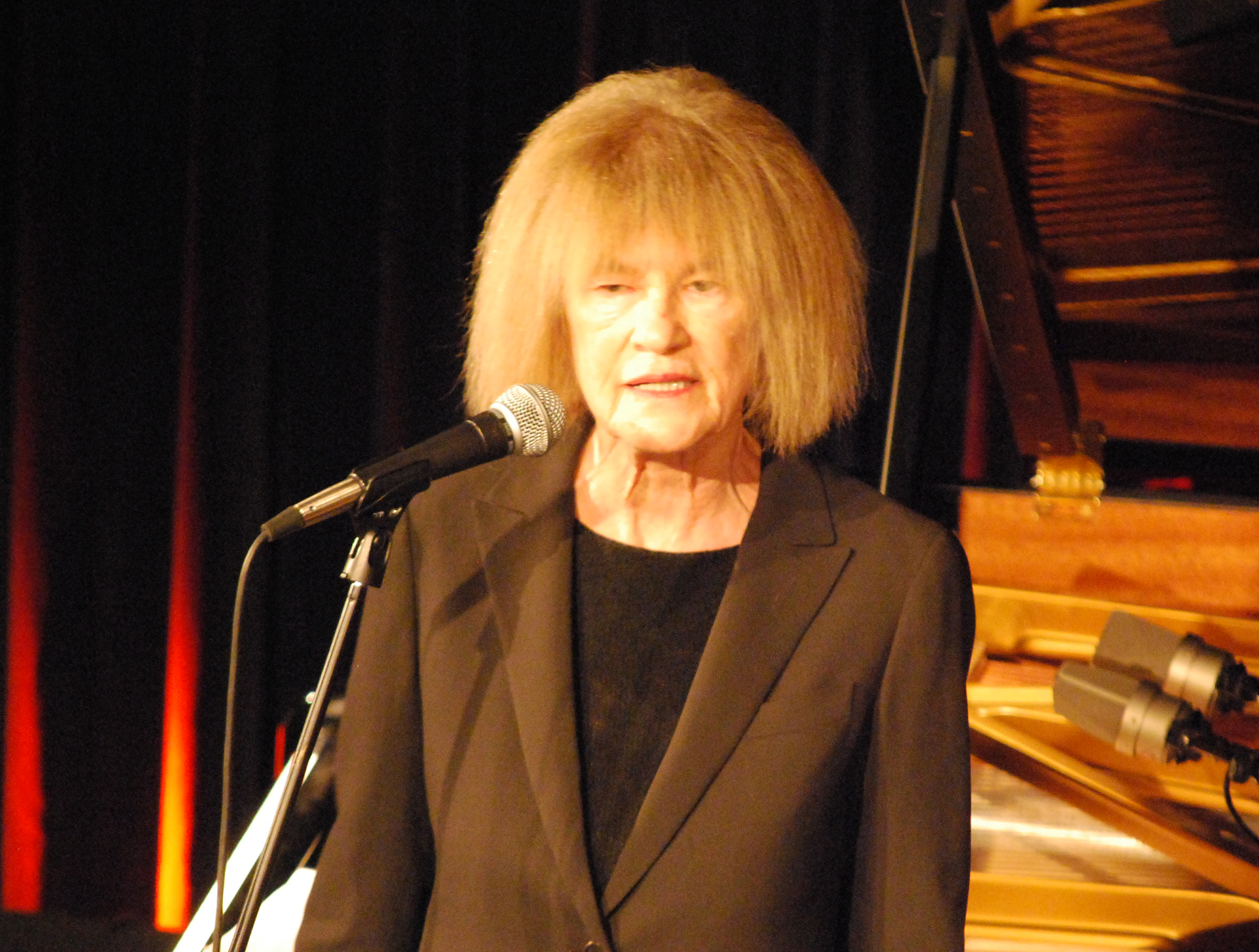
- Bley in 2009

Background information
- Born: Lovella May Borg; May 11, 1936; Oakland, California, U.S.
- Died: October 17, 2023 (aged 87) Willow, New York, U.S.
- Genre: Jazz
- Occupations: Musician; bandleader; composer
- Instruments: Piano; organ
- Years active: 1960–2020
- Labels: WATT; ECM; Universal
- Formerly of: Michael Mantler; Steve Swallow; Paul Bley; Nick Mason; Johnny Griffin; Gary Burton; Jimmy Giuffre; George Russell; Art Farmer; Liberation Music Orchestra; Jack Bruce; Charlie Haden; Jazz Composer's Orchestra; Paul Haines

Carla Bley (born Lovella May Borg; May 11, 1936 – October 17, 2023) was an American jazz composer, pianist, organist, and bandleader. An important figure in the free jazz movement of the 1960s, she gained acclaim for her jazz opera Escalator over the Hill (released as a triple LP set), as well as a book of compositions that have been performed by many other artists, including Gary Burton, Jimmy Giuffre, George Russell, Art Farmer, Robert Wyatt, John Scofield, and her ex-husband Paul Bley. She was a pioneer in the development of independent artist-owned record labels, and recorded over two dozen albums between 1966 and 2019.

== Early life ==
Bley was born in Oakland, California, in 1936, to Swedish parents. Her father, Emil Borg, a piano teacher and church choirmaster, encouraged her to sing and to learn to play the piano; her mother, Arline Anderson, died of a heart attack when Bley was eight years old. After giving up church to immerse herself in roller skating at the age of fourteen, she moved to New York City at seventeen and became a cigarette girl at Birdland, where she met jazz pianist Paul Bley, who encouraged her to start composing. She toured with him under the name Karen Borg before changing her name in 1957 to Carla Borg. She married Bley and took his name the same year, later divorcing. She kept the surname professionally thereafter.

== Career ==
A number of musicians began to record Bley's compositions: George Russell recorded "Bent Eagle" for his album Stratusphunk in 1960; Jimmy Giuffre recorded "Ictus" on his album Thesis; and Paul Bley's Barrage consisted entirely of her compositions. Throughout her career, Bley thought of herself as a writer first, describing herself as 99 percent composer and one percent pianist.

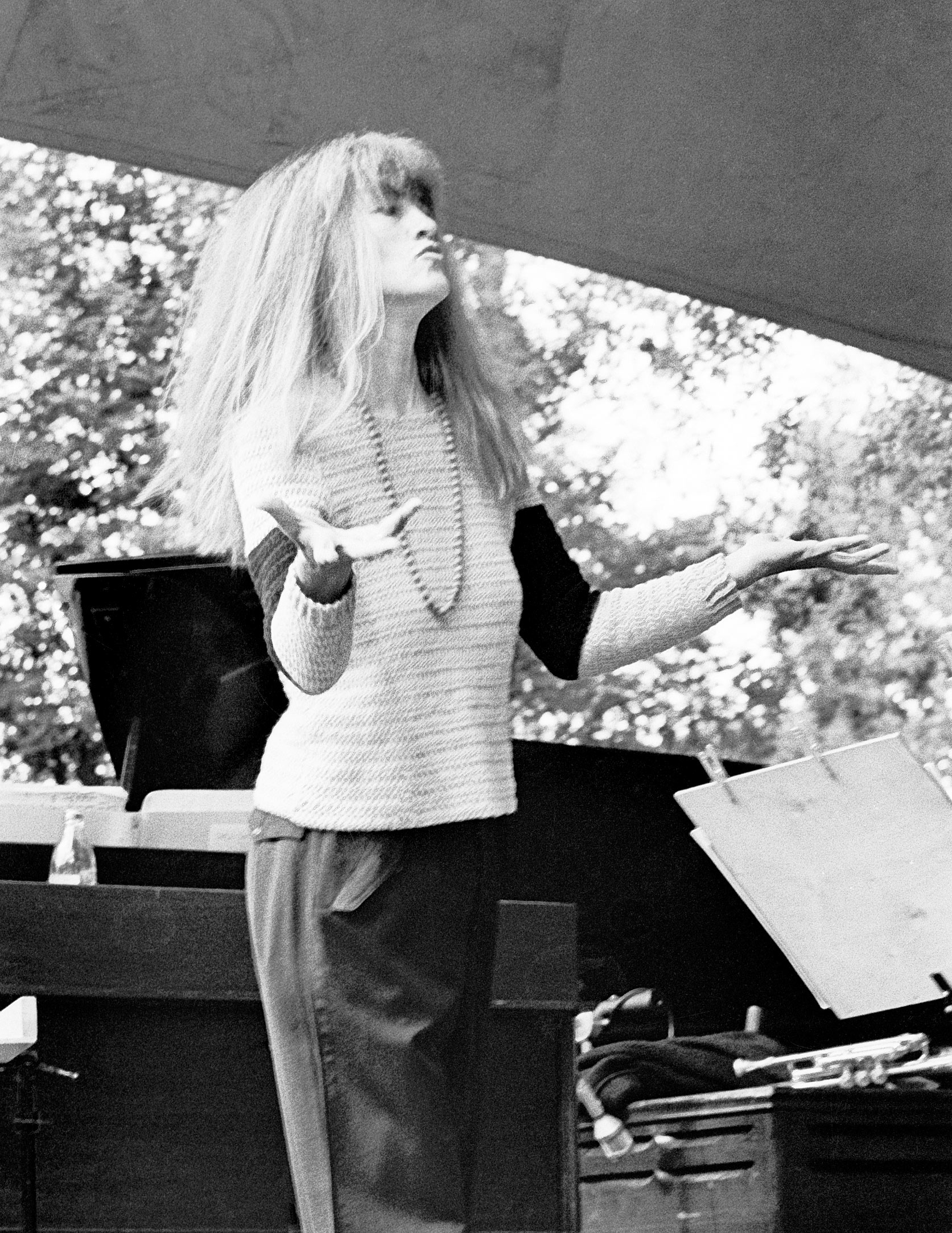
Bley conducting her band at the Pori Jazz Festival in Finland, 1978

In 1964, she was involved in organizing the Jazz Composers Guild, which brought together the most innovative musicians in New York at the time. She then had a personal and professional relationship with Michael Mantler, with whom she had a daughter, Karen Mantler, who also became a musician. Bley and Mantler were married from 1965 to 1991. With Mantler, she co-led the Jazz Composers' Orchestra and started the JCOA record label which issued a number of historic recordings by Clifford Thornton, Don Cherry, and Roswell Rudd, as well as her own magnum opus Escalator Over The Hill and Mantler's The Jazz Composer's Orchestra LPs. Bley and Mantler were pioneers in the development of independent artist-owned record labels, and also started WATT Records and the now defunct New Music Distribution Service, which specialized in small, independent labels that issued recordings of "creative improvised music".

Bley arranged and composed music for bassist Charlie Haden's Liberation Music Orchestra, and wrote A Genuine Tong Funeral for vibraphonist Gary Burton. Bley collaborated with a number of other artists, including Jack Bruce, Robert Wyatt, and Nick Mason, drummer for the rock group Pink Floyd. Mason's solo debut album Nick Mason's Fictitious Sports was written entirely by Bley, and features, alongside Mason on drums, many of her regular band musicians, leading Brian Olewnick of AllMusic to consider it a Carla Bley album in all but name.

Wolfgang Sandner summarized for Frankfurter Allgemeine Zeitung that she was "great as a stimulator, as a muse, catalyst, idea generator, as a sounding board and amplifier, also in refusing – virtuosity, fetishised technique, perfect craft, convention and false pathos".

== Later life and death ==
Bley continued to record frequently with her own big band, which included Lew Soloff from Blood, Sweat & Tears, and with a number of smaller ensembles, notably the Lost Chords.

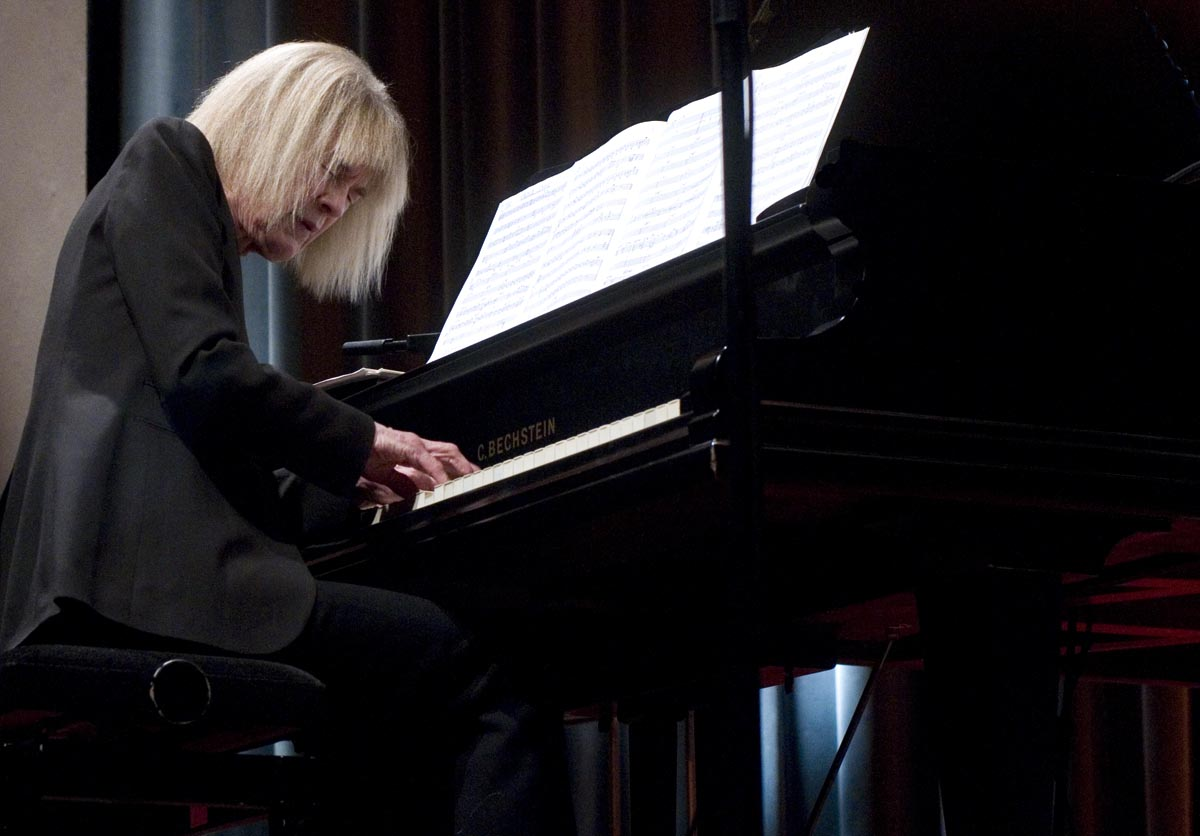
Bley playing in 2009

After Bley's marriage to Mantler ended, she began a relationship with bassist Steve Swallow.

In 2005, she arranged the music for and performed on Charlie Haden's latest Liberation Music Orchestra tour and recording, Not in Our Name.

Her final album, Life Goes On, was released in 2020.

In 2018, Bley was diagnosed with brain cancer, from which she died at home in Willow, New York, on October 17, 2023, at age 87.

== Awards ==
Bley was awarded a Guggenheim Fellowship in 1972 for music composition. In 2009, she received the German Jazz Trophy "A Life for Jazz". Bley received the NEA Jazz Masters Award in 2015.
