= Suite! =

Studio album by Roberto Magris
- Released: 2019
- Recorded: November 1, 2018
- Studios: Transient Sound, Chicago, Illinois
- Genre: Jazz
- Length: 112:33 (2 CD)
- Labels: JMood Records; JM-18
- Producer: Paul Collins

Roberto Magris chronology
Sun Stone (2019)	Suite! (2019)	A Step Into Light (2020)

Suite! is a double album by jazz pianist Roberto Magris released on the JMood Records label in 2019, featuring performances by Magris with his group from Chicago.

== Reception ==
Professional ratings
Review scores
Source	Rating
All About Jazz	4.5/5 stars
All About Jazz	4.5/5 stars
All About Jazz	4/5 stars
All About Jazz	4/5 stars
Jazz Journal	4/5 stars
Musica	4/5 stars
Jazzport	9.2/10 stars
Chicago Jazz Magazine	
Jazzrytmit	
Jazz’ Halo	
JazzdaGama	
Jazz Hot	

The All About Jazz review by Dan McClenaghan awarded the album 4½ stars and states: “The quick opinion on Suite!: the most successfully ambitious recording in Magris' discography, his magnum opus. Many double albums showcase the artist reaching a pinnacle of expression. For Roberto Magris, Suite! does just that, as the pianist / bandleader takes a step in the direction of social consciousness and spirituality with a killer band.”

The All About Jazz review by Edward Blanco awarded the album 4½ stars and states: “Suite! is much more than an excellent jazz recording, it's a collection of wonderful music helpful in conveying and spreading a little peace, love and happiness, needed now, more than ever. Where and when have we heard this before?”

The All About Jazz review by Karl Ackermann awarded the album 4 stars and states: “Suite! is Magris' best work to date and should appeal to a wide jazz audience.”

The All About Jazz review by Jack Bowers awarded the album 4 stars and states: “Magris follows his own star and keeps the focus on expertise and variety, pressing his purpose with flair and leaving any verdict, pro or con, in the capable hands of his audience.”

The Jazz Journal review by Brian Morton awarded the album 4 stars and states: "He’s absolutely fluent in the blues-based American tradition, but his playing and his structural ideas bespeak a European sensibility. The two are never in contention but seem to co-exist warmly and always creatively."

The Chicago Jazz Magazine review by Hrayr Attarian states: “Suite! is, perhaps, Magris’ magnum opus. It is certainly his most mature as it demonstrates his brilliant pianism and his astute leadership. Here, Magris has enhanced his signature superb musicianship with a much-needed social consciousness as well as an uplifting spirituality.”

== Track listing ==
CD 1

1. In the Wake of Poseidon (Aubree Collins/Robert Fripp) - 8:19
2. Sunset Breeze (Roberto Magris) - 10:36
3. A Message for a World to Come (Roberto Magris) - 16:30
4. Too Young to Go Steady (Jimmy McHugh) - 7:42
5. Suite! (Roberto Magris) - 8:09
6. Circles of Existence (Roberto Magris) - 10:56

CD 2

1. (End) of a Summertime (George Gershwin) - 3:03
2. Perfect Peace (Aubree Collins/Roberto Magris) - 7:10
3. (You're My Everything) Yes I Am! (Roberto Magris) - 4:29
4. Love Creation (Roberto Magris) - 2:03
5. One with the Sun (Jerry Martini) - 5:35
6. Never Let Me Go (Livingston/Evans) - 5:20
7. Chicago Nights (Roberto Magris) - 6:42
8. The Island of Nowhere (Aubree Collins/Roberto Magris) - 7:05
9. Imagine (John Lennon) - 4:15
10. Audio Notebook - 4:05

== Personnel ==
=== Musicians ===
- Eric Jacobson – trumpet
- Mark Colby – tenor sax
- Roberto Magris – piano and Fender Rhodes
- Eric Hochberg – bass
- Greg Artry – drums
- PJ Aubree Collins – voice

=== Production ===
- Paul Collins – executive producer and producer
- Vijay Tellis-Nayak – engineering
- Abe Golstien – design
- Bohuse Hacova and Paul Collins – photography
