= Check-In (album) =

Studio album by Roberto Magris Europlane
- Released: 2005
- Recorded: September 2, 2003
- Studio: Urban Recording Studio Trieste, Italy
- Genre: Jazz
- Length: 72:02
- Label: Soul Note (121325-2)
- Producer: Roberto Magris and Gabriele Centis

Roberto Magris chronology
Europlane Orchestra – Plays Kurt Weill (2000)	Check-In (2005)	Il Bello del Jazz (2006)

Check-In is an album by jazz pianist Roberto Magris released on the Soul Note label in 2005, and including performances by the Roberto Magris Europlane featuring saxophonist Tony Lakatos.

== Reception ==
Professional ratings
Review scores
Source	Rating
AllMusic	4/5 stars
All About Jazz	4/5 stars
All About Jazz	4/5 stars
All About Jazz	4/5 stars
All About Jazz	4/5 stars
All About Jazz	4/5 stars
The Irish Times	5/5 stars
Concerto	4/5 stars
The Penguin Guide to Jazz Recordings	3.5/4 stars

The AllMusic review by Alain Drouot awarded the album 4 stars.

== Track listing ==
1. I Remember You (Schertzinger/Mercer) – 7:19
2. Blues for my Sleeping Baby (Roberto Magris) - 12:29
3. African Mood (Roberto Magris) - 9:35
4. Luci Lontane (Roberto Magris) - 6:20
5. What Blues? (Roberto Magris) - 5:26
6. Why Did I Choose You (Martin/Leonard) - 6:00
7. I Concentrate on You (Cole Porter) - 7:26
8. Che Cosa C’è (Gino Paoli) - 3:26

== Personnel ==
=== Musicians ===
- Tony Lakatos – tenor sax and soprano sax
- Michael Erian – tenor sax and soprano sax
- Roberto Magris – piano
- Robert Balzar – bass
- Gabriele Centis – drums
- Fulvio Zafret – congas (on # 3)

=== Production ===
- Roberto Magris and Gabriele Centis – co-producers
- Flavio Bonandrini – executive producer
- Fulvio Zafret – engineering
- Maria Bonandrini – design
