= Restless Spirits - Big Band Ritmo-Sinfonica Città di Verona plays the music of Roberto Magris =

2009 album

Studio album by Big Band Ritmo-Sinfonica Città di Verona & Roberto Magris
- Released: 2009
- Recorded: September 28, 2008
- Studio: Teatro Martinelli, Castelnuovo del Garda, Italy
- Genre: Jazz
- Length: 69:55
- Label: Velut Luna; CVLD 175
- Producer: Marco Lincetto

Roberto Magris chronology
Alfabeats Nu Jazz - Stones (2006)	Restless Spirits - Big Band Ritmo-Sinfonica Città di Verona plays the music of Roberto Magris (2009)	Current Views (2009)

Restless Spirits - Big Band Ritmo-Sinfonica Città di Verona plays the music of Roberto Magris is an album recorded by jazz pianist Roberto Magris with the Big Band Ritmo-Sinfonica Città di Verona released on the Velut Luna label in 2009. The disc is dedicated to the music of Roberto Magris, arranged for a large orchestra and also includes, as guests, the trumpeter Massimo Greco and the percussionist Sbibu.

== Reception ==
Professional ratings
Review scores
Source	Rating
All About Jazz	4.5/5 stars
All About Jazz	
All About Jazz	
Jazzrytmit	

The All About Jazz review by Raul Da Gama awarded the album 4½ stars and simply states: "Almost a mirror of the journey of the soul in Dante Alighieri's classic 13th epic poem of eternal human exodus, The Divine Comedy. The journey takes souls and spirits through Purgatory and into Paradise. Therefore, the key is to succumb to the charms of the music and give in to its narrative. This is beautifully written and arranged, and constitutes a deeply profound meditative journey." The All About Jazz review by Jack Bowers simply states: " On Restless Spirits, Magris proves he is as proficient writing for a big band as he is for trios or quartets. He and the Big Band Ritmo Sinfonica Citta di Verona have designed an impressive album that is unlike any others you're apt to chance upon." The All About Jazz review by Jerry D’Souza simply states: " Magris uses a wide canvas for his compositions and his palette is rich in its colorful diversity. He daubs it with the stylistic impressionism of funk, ballads, the blues and African rhythms. And it all comes to life in the most exultant manner. Magris and the Big Band Ritmo Sinfonia Citta Di Verona combine for expressively exhilarating music that will linger long in the mind and heart. " The Ken Franckling’s Jazz Notes included Restless Spirits – Big Band Ritmo-Sinfonica Città di Verona plays the music of Roberto Magris in the list of the 10 best new jazz releases of 2009.

== Track listing ==
1. African Mood (Roberto Magris) - 6:58
2. Blues For My Sleeping Baby (Roberto Magris) - 6:47
3. Peaceful Heart (Roberto Magris) - 6:57
4. Ambiguous (Roberto Magris) - 9:48
5. Restless Spirits (Roberto Magris) - 7:44
6. Short & Shorter (Roberto Magris) - 6:35
7. Standard Life (Roberto Magris) - 8:36
8. Maliblues (Roberto Magris) - 6:36
9. Ambiguous (alternate take) (Roberto Magris) - 9:35

== Personnel ==
=== Guest Soloists ===
- Roberto Magris – piano e Fender Rhodes
- Massimo Greco – trumpet
- Sbibu – percussion

=== Musicians ===
- Marco Pasetto – conductor and soprano sax (on 8)
- Patrizia Ballardini – flute
- Franco Lissandrini – flute
- Beatrice Maistri – flute
- Barbara Mazzon – flute
- Giulia Realdini – flute
- Elena Zavarise – flute
- Matteo Costanzi – trumpet
- Giorgio Fiorini – trumpet
- Davide Gagliardo – trumpet
- Sandro Gilioli – trumpet
- Marco Sorio – trumpet
- Giovanna Bissoli – soprano sax
- Emanuele Ballini – alto sax
- Paolo Girardi – alto sax
- Paolo Pesenti – alto sax
- Orazio Boscagin – tenor sax
- Stefano Buttura – tenor sax
- Sandro Avesani – baritone sax
- Filippo Borgo – clarinet
- Caterina Gatto – clarinet
- Elisabetta Grego – clarinet
- Alessandro Manfredi – clarinet
- Nicola Zeggio – clarinet
- Paolo Delaini – bass clarinet
- Marco Finato – bass clarinet
- Anna Vittoria Zanardi – bassoon
- Saulo Agostini – trombone
- Linda Anzolin – trombone
- Gino Farenzena – trombone
- Giorgio Morelato – trombone
- Giordano Bruno Tedeschi – trombone
- Ester Anzolin – French horn
- Denis Cavallini – French horn
- Graziana Marchioni – French horn
- Marco Pallaver – French horn
- Mario Cracco – tuba
- Ivo Bonazzi – electric guitar
- Daniele Rotunno - keyboards
- Giuseppe Gasperini - electric bass
- Luca Zoccatelli – electric bass
- Giorgio Buttura – glockenspiel
- Stefano Zuffellato – drums
- Stefano Sartori – percussion

=== Production ===
- Marco Lincetto – executive producer and producer
- Marco Lincetto – engineering
- Giovanna Bissoli – painting
- Paolo Girardi – photography
