= Sunstone (disambiguation) =

Sunstone is a mineral used as a gemstone.

Sunstone or sun stone, may also refer to:

== Places and fictional locations ==
- Sunstone Village, Ninemile Canyon, Utah, United States
- Sunstone, a neighborhood in Viera West, Florida, United States
- Sunstone House, a theatre occupied by the Tower Theatre Company in Stoke Newington, London, England, UK
- Sunstone Manor, a fictional location in Heroes Reborn

== Stones ==
- Sunstone (medieval), a crystal mentioned in medieval manuscripts in Iceland and supposed to reveal the position of the Sun in overcast sky
- Iceland spar, a transparent crystallized mineral
- Aztec sun stone, a 16th-century sculpture excavated in Mexico City
- Sun Stone Obelisk, Gympie Pyramid, Gympie, Queensland, Australia

=== Fictional stones ===
- An artificially-grown stone in the fantasy book series The Seventh Tower
- Sun Stone, a magical item used by titular character in the animated series Princess Gwenevere and the Jewel Riders
- Titular magical objects in the video game Hugo: The Quest for the Sunstones
- A fictional gemstone in the Little Fuzzy, novel series
- A fictional mineral in the Dinotopia book series (and its television adaptation)

== Literature ==
- Sunstone (magazine), a periodical that discusses Mormonism through scholarship, art, short fiction, and poetry
- Sunstone (comics), an LGBT and BDSM related webcomic
- "Piedra de Sol", a 1957 poem by Octavio Paz with translated title of "Sunstone"

== Music ==
- Sun Stone (album), a 2019 album by Roberto Magris
  - "Sun Stone" (song), a song by Roberto Magris off the eponymous 2019 album Sun Stone (album)
- "Sunstone" (song), by Russell Ferrante, performed by Eric Marienthal, off the 1998 album Walk Tall (album)

== Other uses ==
- Sunstone, a fictional character from Steven Universe
- An architectural motif in temples of The Church of Jesus Christ of Latter-day Saints, see Temple architecture (LDS Church)
- Sunstone (1979 film), a pioneering computer-generated animated film.
