= Il Bello del Jazz =

Studio album by Roberto Magris Europlane
- Released: 2006
- Recorded: August 28 and 30, 2003
- Studio: Urban Recording Studio Trieste, Italy
- Genre: Jazz
- Length: 61:24
- Label: Soul Note (121395-2)
- Producer: Roberto Magris

Roberto Magris chronology
Check-In (2005)	Il Bello del Jazz (2006)	Alfabeats Nu Jazz - Stones (2006)

Il Bello del Jazz is an album by jazz pianist Roberto Magris released on the Soul Note label in 2011, including performances by the Roberto Magris Europlane featuring saxophonist Herb Geller.

== Reception ==
Professional ratings
Review scores
Source	Rating
AllMusic	4/5 stars
All About Jazz	4/5 stars
All About Jazz	4/5 stars
All About Jazz	4/5 stars
All About Jazz	4/5 stars
The Irish Times	4/5 stars
The Penguin Guide to Jazz Recordings	3/4 stars

The AllMusic review by Scott Yanow awarded the album 4 stars and simply states: "The music is mostly straight-ahead jazz, mixing together medium-tempo romps with lyrical ballads. Magris and Geller are the main soloists, guitarist Darko Jurkovic guests on four numbers, and bassist Rudi Engel and drummer Gabriele Centis are excellent in support in the lead voices. Il Bello del Jazz is a set that grows in interest with each listen."

== Track listing ==
1. No Sadness (Roberto Magris) – 5:50
2. Stray Form (Herb Geller) - 4:36
3. Some Other Spring (Kitchings/Herzog) - 5:16
4. Key Largo (Benny Carter) - 4:38
5. A New Town Is a Blue Town (Adler/Ross) - 7:08
6. Here I'll Stay (Weill/Lerner) - 5:33
7. Ah Moore (Al Cohn) - 5:03
8. Il Bello del Jazz (Roberto Magris) - 5:14
9. Pretty Woman (Stephen Sondheim) - 6:04
10. Parker's Pen (Roberto Magris) - 5:07
11. Deception (Herb Geller) - 6:48

== Personnel ==
=== Musicians ===
- Herb Geller - alto sax
- Darko Jurkovic - guitar (on # 1, 8, 10, 11)
- Roberto Magris - piano
- Rudi Engel - bass
- Gabriele Centis - drums

=== Production ===
- Roberto Magris – producer
- Flavio Bonandrini – executive producer
- Fulvio Zafret – engineering
- Maria Bonandrini – design
