= Duo & Trio =

Studio album by Roberto Magris
- Released: 2022
- Recorded: November 2, 2012, and November 7, 2019
- Studios: Chapman Recording Studio, Lenexa, Kansas and Transient Sound, Chicago, Illinois
- Genre: Jazz
- Length: 65:27
- Labels: JMood Records; JM-22
- Producer: Paul Collins

Roberto Magris chronology
Match Point (2021)	Duo & Trio (2022)	High Quote (2023)

Professional ratings
Review scores
Source	Rating
All About Jazz	4/5 stars
JazzWax	
Jazz Hot	
Coleurs Jazz	
Jazz World Quest	
Sk.jazz	4/5 stars
Concerto	4.5/5 stars

Duo & Trio is an album by jazz pianist Roberto Magris released on the JMood Records label in 2022, featuring performances by Magris on duo with saxophonist Mark Colby and on trio with his group from Kansas City. Colby performs on the odd-numbered tracks, the trio on the even-numbered.

== Reception ==
The All About Jazz review by Jack Bowers awarded the album 4 stars and simply states: "a forceful one-two punch, initiated by Magris and Colby and completed by his sure-handed trio." The JazzWax review by Mark Myers states: "Magris's new album is truly special, particularly the way in which the two different formats were combined, leap-frogging over each other. And Magris's playing is lush and on point and his technique stellar, shifting from bop to a more introspective and moody feel.."

== Track listing ==
1. Cool World! (Roberto Magris) – 4:16
2. Bellarosa (Elmo Hope) – 5:56
3. Some Other Time (Leonard Bernstein) – 7:51
4. Melody For "C" (Sonny Clark) – 5:50
5. Papa's Got A Brand New Rag (Roberto Magris) – 6:06
6. Cherokee (Ray Noble) – 7:58
7. Old Folks (Shuman) – 5:21
8. Samba Rasta (Andrew Hill) – 5:58
9. In The Springtime Of My Soul (Roberto Magris) – 10:10
10. A Rhyme For Angela (Kurt Weill) – 7:01
11. Blues For Herbie "G" (Roberto Magris) – 3:50

== Personnel ==
=== Musicians ===
on # 1, 3, 5, 7, 9, 11

- Roberto Magris - piano
- Mark Colby – tenor sax, soprano sax

on # 2, 4, 6, 8, 10

- Roberto Magris – piano
- Elisa Pruett – bass
- Brian Steever - drums
- Pablo Sanhueza - congas on # 4 and 8, only

=== Production ===
- Paul Collins – executive producer and producer
- Vijay Tellis-Nayak – engineering (tracks # 1, 3, 5, 7, 9, 11)
- George Hunt – engineering (tracks # 2, 4, 6, 8, 10)
- Abe Goldstien – design
- Michael Adams – cover painting
- Jerry Lockett and Paul Collins – photography
