= Jim Mair =

Jim Mair may refer to:

- Jim Mair (ice hockey)
- Jim Mair (musician)
