= Mitteleuropa (album) =

Studio album by Gruppo Jazz Marca
- Released: 1986
- Recorded: October 27, 1985
- Studios: Gulliver Recording Studios, Treviso, Italy
- Genre: Jazz
- Length: 41:22
- Labels: Gulliver (LP 1986) and Arision (CD ARI024 2006)

Roberto Magris chronology
Aria di Città (1983)	Mitteleuropa (1986)	Life in Israel (1990)

Mitteleuropa is an album by the Jazz Marca (Roberto Magris / Lilli Furlan / Franco Polisseni Trio), with the addition of a horn section, guitar, vibes and percussion, released in 1986 on the Gulliver label and reissued in 2006 by the English label Arision.

== Reception ==
Professional ratings
Review scores
Source	Rating
Basic Soul	
Musica Jazz	

The Basic Soul review by Andy Allen simply states: "Here pianist Roberto Magris extends his usual trio to accommodate a horn section giving the compositions a much fuller sound than that found on their Comunicazione Sonora album, which is most effective on the immaculate Dedalus."

== Track listing ==
1. Città Di Frontiera (Roberto Magris) - 12:06
2. Dedalus (Roberto Magris) - 8:15
3. Annamaria (Roberto Magris) - 1:36
4. Three Dorico Time (B. Vatta – arr. R. Magris) - 7:33
5. Blues Transfert (Roberto Magris) - 13:21

== Personnel ==
=== Musicians ===
- Roberto Magris - piano
- Lilli Furlan - bass
- Franco Polisseni - drums
- Andrea Sottani - trumpet
- Sergio Campagnolo - alto sax
- Ettore Martin - tenor sax
- Tiziano Strata - baritone sax
- Roberto Cocever - guitar
- Saverio Tasca - vibraphone and percussion
