= A Step into Light =

Studio album by MUH Trio
- Released: 2020
- Recorded: October 22, 2019
- Studios: Studio Svarov, Svarov, Czech Republic
- Genre: Jazz
- Length: 73:24
- Labels: JMood Records; JM-20
- Producer: František Uhlíř

Roberto Magris chronology
| Suite! (2019) | A Step into Light (2020) | Shuffling Ivories (2021) |

Professional ratings
Review scores
| Source | Rating |
|---|---|
| All About Jazz | 4.5/5 stars |
| All About Jazz | 4/5 stars |
| Sk.jazz | 4.5/5 stars |
| Jazzport | 9.3/10 stars |
| Jazzrytmit | |
| Jazz Hot | |

A Step into Light is an album by the MUH Trio (Roberto Magris / František Uhlíř / Jaromir Helešic Trio) recorded in the Czech Republic and released on the JMood Records label in 2020. It is the sequel of the album Prague After Dark.

== Reception ==
The All About Jazz review by Edward Blanco awarded the album 4½ stars and simply states: "The music can be described as traditional straight-ahead jazz packing quite a punch for a standard piano trio. There's little doubt about this one, it certainly is A Step Into Light as evidenced by the sound and magic produced by The MUH Trio, European jazz mastery at its best." The All About Jazz review by Jack Bowers awarded the album 4 stars and simply states: "A Step Into Light blends pleasing variety with solid rapport and astute solos. You can't ask for more than that from any trio."

== Track listing ==
1. "A Step into Light" (Roberto Magris) – 8:42
2. "The Meaning of the Blues" (Leah Worth, Bobby Troup) – 8:24
3. "What Is This Thing Called Love?" (Cole Porter) – 6:29
4. "Waltz for Sonny" (František Uhlíř) – 5:59
5. "Continued Light" (Magris) – 6:44
6. "Italy" (Magris) – 6:55
7. "Giulio" (Uhlíř) – 5:56
8. "Lush Life" (Billy Strayhorn) – 8:17
9. "Our Blues" (Magris, Uhlíř, Jaromir Helešic) – 4:40
10. "Bosa Cosa" (Uhlíř) – 5:06
11. "Here We Are" (Magris) – 6:04

== Personnel ==
Musicians

- Roberto Magris – piano
- František Uhlíř – double bass
- Jaromir Helešic – drums

Production

- František Uhlíř – producer
- Paul Collins – executive producer
- Lukas Martinek – engineering
- Abe Goldstien – design
- Bohuse Hacova and Hans-Joachim Maquet – photography
