= Freedom Is Peace =

Live album by Roberto Magris
- Released: 2024
- Recorded: 25 April 2024
- Venues: European Capital of Culture 2024, Bad Ischl, Salzkammergut, Bad Goisern, Austria
- Genre: Jazz
- Length: 75:50
- Labels: JMood Records; JM-26
- Producer: Roberto Magris

Roberto Magris chronology
Love Is Passing Thru (2024)	Freedom Is Peace (2024)	Lovely day(s) (2025)

Freedom Is Peace is an album by jazz pianist Roberto Magris and his Europlane for Jazz ensemble, released on the JMood Records label in 2024. In 1998 Magris formed his Europlane band, including musicians from different Central European countries, which recorded several albums and performed actively throughout Europe until 2003. More than twenty years later, the pianist assembles a new Europlane group for this special reunion, recorded live in Austria as part of the celebrations of European Capital of Culture in Bad Ischl and the Salzkammergut region.

== Reception ==
Professional ratings
Review scores
Source	Rating
All About Jazz (Blanco)	4/5 stars
All About Jazz (Bowers)	4/5 stars
Concerto	5/5 stars
Kathodic	9/10 stars
Sk.jazz	4/5 stars

The All About Jazz review by Edward Blanco awarded the album 4 stars and simply states: "a powerful and captivating session of jazz with a soul-searching social conscious message reflective of the turbulent times we live in today and affirming that jazz can be a political statement which this album is designed to do gracefully." The All About Jazz review by Jack Bowers awarded the album 4 stars and simply states: "As before, snugly swinging bop-centered jazz is the order of the day; and as before, Magris heads an all- star lineup of world-class musicians from half a dozen European countries. When summing up, the phrase "worth waiting for" springs to mind, and the hope is that another two decades will not pass before Magris and his superlative sextet are heard from again." Jazz Hot remarked, "Everything seems simple and direct like the title of the album Freedom Is Peace."

== Track listing ==
Freedom Is Peace track listing
No.	Title	Length
1.	"Freedom Is Peace"	8:52
2.	"The Island of Nowhere"	6:56
3.	"Malay Tone Poem"	9:17
4.	"Laverne"	9:15
5.	"Something to Save from EU (You)"	12:18
6.	"When You Touch Me"	12:45
7.	"Loose Fit"	7:02
8.	"Hip! for the Conference"	9:09
Total length:		75:34

== Personnel ==
=== Musicians ===
- Lukáš Oravec – trumpet and flugelhorn
- Florian Bramböck – alto sax and baritone sax
- Tony Lakatos – tenor sax and soprano sax
- Roberto Magris – piano and arrangement
- Rudi Engel – bass
- Gašper Bertoncelj – drums

=== Production ===
- A recording by the Austrian Broadcasting Corporation (Radio Österreich 1)
- Philipp Weismann (ORF) – producer
- Paul Collins – executive producer
- Alois Hummer (ORF) – engineering
- Abe Goldstien – design
