= High Quote =

Studio album by Roberto Magris
- Released: 2023
- Recorded: November 3, 2012
- Studios: Chapman Recording Studio, Lenexa, Kansas
- Genre: Jazz
- Length: 60:46
- Labels: JMood Records; JM-09
- Producer: Paul Collins

Roberto Magris chronology
Duo & Trio (2022)	High Quote (2023)	Love Is Passing Thru (2024)

Professional ratings
Review scores
Source	Rating
All About Jazz	3.5/5 stars
JazzWax	
Aoide Magazine	
Sk.jazz	3.5/5 stars
Jazz Hot	

High Quote is an album by jazz pianist Roberto Magris released on the JMood Records label in 2023, featuring performances by Magris on a small big band format with the JM Horns from Kansas City.

== Reception ==
The All About Jazz review by Jack Bowers awarded the album 3.5 stars and simply states: "While High Quote represents a slight departure for Magris, who is more often heard in smaller-group settings, the results of his ability to adapt are undeniably clear on this first-rate session." The JazzWax review by Mark Myers states: "... a terrific album of originals." The Aoide Magazine review by Eric Harabadian states: "High Quote refers to paying tribute and homage to some of the greats of classic jazz composers and arrangers. From small combos to larger groups Magris proves time and time again that he is a man for all musical seasons. "

== Track listing ==
1. High Quote (Roberto Magris) – 8:20
2. Together In Love (Roberto Magris) – 5:43
3. Black Coffee (Sonny Burke/Paul Francis Webster) – 7:47
4. Hong Kong Nightline/The Island Of Nowhere (Roberto Magris) – 12:53
5. Steps in the Dark (Roberto Magris) – 8:24
6. The Endless Groove (Roberto Magris) – 5:39
7. Naked Tina Serenade (Roberto Magris) – 7:31
8. The Changing Scene (Hank Mobley) – 4:33

== Personnel ==
=== Musicians ===
- Josh Williams – trumpet
- Jim Mair – alto sax
- Matt Otto – tenor sax
- Aryana Nemati – baritone sax
- Jason Goudeau – trombone
- Roberto Magris – piano and arrangement
- Elisa Pruett – bass
- Brian Steever – drums
- Pablo Sanhueza – congas and percussion
- Monique Danielle – vocal (on # 2 and 3)

=== Production ===
- Paul Collins – Executive producer and producer
- George Hunt – Engineering
- Abe Goldstien – Design
- Jerry Lockett – Photography
