= Morgan Rewind: A Tribute to Lee Morgan Vol. 2 =

Studio album by Roberto Magris Septet
- Released: 2014
- Recorded: November 1, 2010
- Studios: Chapman Recording Studio, Lenexa, Kansas
- Genre: Jazz
- Length: 93:01 (2 CD)
- Labels: JMood Records; JM-07
- Producer: Paul Collins

Roberto Magris chronology
One Night in with Hope and More Vol. 2 (2013)	Morgan Rewind: A Tribute to Lee Morgan Vol. 2 (2014)	An Evening with Herb Geller & The Roberto Magris Trio - Live in Europe 2009 (2014)

Morgan Rewind: A Tribute To Lee Morgan, Vol. 2 is a double album by jazz pianist Roberto Magris released on the JMood Records label in 2014, featuring performances by Magris with his septet from Kansas City.

== Reception ==
Professional ratings
Review scores
Source	Rating
DownBeat	3.5/5 stars
All About Jazz	4.5/5 stars
All About Jazz	4.5/5 stars
All About Jazz	3.5/5 stars
Cadence	
JazzWax	
Jazzrytmit	

The DownBeat review by Sean J. O'Connell awarded the album 3 ½ stars and simply states: "This is a fun set of hard-driving swing that upholds the spirit of its honoree, shining a light on the trumpeter’s lesser-known compositions." The All About Jazz review by Dan McClenaghan awarded the album 4 ½ stars and simply states: “This is classic hard bop, blowing and swinging hard, nudged a bit in a modern direction, laid down with a zesty joi de vive.” The All About Jazz review by Edward Blanco awarded the album 4 ½ stars and simply states: "Pianist Roberto Magris designs a hard-driving swinging tribute to a long gone legend, transforming Morgan's bop-infused style with an energetic percussive new twist."

== Track listing ==
CD 1

1. A Bid for Sid (Lee Morgan) - 5:59
2. Exotique (Lee Morgan) - 7:53
3. Blue Lace (Lee Morgan) - 7:14
4. Cunning Lee (Lee Morgan) - 6:41
5. The Sixth Sense (Lee Morgan) - 5:32
6. Soft Touch (Lee Morgan) - 7:03
7. Gary’s Notebook (Lee Morgan) - 7:38

CD 2

1. Speedball (Lee Morgan) - 5:10
2. Libreville (Roberto Magris) - 9:29
3. Get Yo’self Togetha (Lee Morgan) - 6:51
4. A Summer’s Kiss (Roberto Magris) - 7:33
5. Zambia (Lee Morgan) - 4:58
6. Helen’s Ritual (Lee Morgan) - 6:46
7. Audio Notebook - 6:46

== Personnel ==
=== Musicians ===
- Hermon Mehari – trumpet
- Jim Mair – tenor sax, soprano sax, flute
- Peter Schlamb – vibraphone
- Roberto Magris - piano
- Elisa Pruett - bass
- Brian Steever - drums
- Pablo Sanhueza - congas and percussion

=== Production ===
- Paul Collins – executive producer and producer
- George Hunt – engineering
- Stephen Bocioaca – design
- Jerry Lockett – photography
