= Lovely Day(s) =

Live album by Roberto Magris
- Released: 2025
- Recorded: January 10 and 11, 2024
- Venues: Circolo Thelonious Trieste, Italy
- Genre: Jazz
- Length: 55:23
- Labels: JMood Records; JM-25
- Producer: Roberto Magris

Roberto Magris chronology
Freedom Is Peace (2024)	Lovely Day(s) (2025)	In Action (2026)

Lovely Day(s) is a solo piano album by Italian jazz pianist Roberto Magris released on the JMood Records label in 2025. It is the first solo piano album he has ever recorded in his career.

As noted by Edward Blanco on "All About Jazz" and Dick Hovenga on "Written In Jazz," who cite the album's liner notes, the album title has a double meaning: one positive—since Magris spent two lovely days at the piano—and the other negative, which sarcastically alludes to the fact that, during those same days, innocent people were dying because of the wars in Ukraine and Palestine. And there also is a reference to a sort of akasha (a shared consciousness) of jazz music."

"Lovely Day(s)" The album has received very positive reviews from international critics. Certain reviewers focused on Magris' musicianship that invites comparisons to Art Tatum and Errol Garner and recall the composers whohave influenced him over the years.

== Critical reception ==
Professional ratings
Review scores
Source	Rating
All About Jazz	4/5 stars
Papatamus Redux	4/5 stars
Jazzism	
Written In Music	4/5 stars
JazzWax	
DownBeat	3/5 stars
Concerto	4.5/5 stars
Il Manifesto	5/5 stars
Jazz World Quest	
Jazz’halo	
Jazz & Mo’	4/5 stars
Kathodic	9/10 stars
Doppio Jazz	
Sk.jazz	5/5 stars

=== In the U.S. and Canada ===
Abe Goldstien, writing for Papatamus Redux, said that Lovely Day(s) reveals an aspect of Magris (the solo piano) that has not been thoroughly examined in his earlier recordings. In his review for Jazz World Quest, Stephen Bocioaca remarked that Lovely Day(s) is a must-listen in contemporary jazz. In a piece for Down Beat, Jim Macnie noted that Magris expresses his affection for mainstream jazz with a wide range of lyricism. Dan McClenaghan, writing for All About Jazz, commented that in this work, we encounter Thelonious Monk's esteemed piece, Bemsha Swing. Magris enhances the harmonic and rhythmic dimensions to create a lively and remarkable upbeat groove.

=== In Europe ===
Writing for Jazzism, Bert Vuijsje said – in Dutch - that with this solo album Magris has largely abandoned his usual bop style in favor of a more subdued, sometimes impressionistic approach. Dick Hovenga of Written In Music said – in Dutch - that Lovely Day(s) has come out at the right moment in Magris’ career to showcase his solo work. Bernard Lefèvre of Jazz’halo said – in Dutch - that Lovely Day(s) is a piano solo album that quickly draws you in and immediately touches your heart. Patrick Auwelaert of Jazz & Mo said – in Dutch - that we can hear a man playing the acoustic piano with great heart and generous soul. Writing for Sk.jazz, Patrick Spanko said – translated from Slovak - that this album opens many doors to unknown chambers.

=== In Italy ===
Writing for Il Manifesto Guido Festinese remarked – in Italian – that the album is nearly a reflection of the musical world that Magris embodies, recalling Jaki Byard, Don Pullen, Erroll Garner, Mc Coy Tyner, and featuring both romantic nuances and rhythmic tempests. Writing for Kathodic, Vittorio Lo Conte stated – in Italian – that Magris extracts notes from the keyboard that originate from the pioneers of jazz, and performs his own compositions and those of the past legends as a continuum. Writing for Doppio Jazz, Francesco Cataldo Verrina noted – in Italian – that in this album the piano, regarded as an orchestral instrument, becomes a means of synthesizing verticality and horizontality, combining harmonic movement with melodic flow, and that the handling of harmony does not depend on predictable progressions, but rather on the capacity to evoke inner dimensions."

== Track listing ==
1. "Blues Clues" (Roberto Magris) – 6:55
2. "Reverend Du Bop" (Andrew Hill) – 9:09
3. "Bemsha Swing" (Thelonious Monk) - 5:05
4. "Laverne" (Andrew Hill) - 7:56
5. "The Time Of This World Is At Hand" (Gault) - 4:45
6. "A Flower is a Lovesome Thing" (Billy Strayhorn) - 3:36
7. "Let’s Cool One" (Thelonious Monk) - 6:12
8. "Lonely Town" (Leonard Bernstein) - 5:40
9. "The Saga of Harrison Crabfeathers" (Steve Kuhn) – 5:44

== Personnel ==
=== Musicians ===
- Roberto Magris – piano

=== Production ===
- Paul Collins – executive producer
- Fulvio Zafret – engineering
- Abe Goldstien – design
