= Sun Stone (album) =

Studio album by Roberto Magris Sextet
- Released: 2019
- Recorded: December 7, 2017
- Studio: Hit Factory Criteria (Miami)
- Genre: Jazz
- Length: 66:47
- Labels: JMood Records; JM-17
- Producer: Paul Collins

Roberto Magris chronology
World Gardens (2018)	Sun Stone (2019)	Suite! (2019)

Sun Stone is an album by jazz pianist Roberto Magris recorded in Miami, released on the JMood Records label in 2019, and featuring performances by the Roberto Magris Sextet with Ira Sullivan, Mark Colby, Shareef Clayton, Jamie Ousley and Rodolfo Zuniga. Jazz Hot magazine rated the album as "indispensable".

== Reception ==
Professional ratings
Review scores
Source	Rating
All About Jazz	3.5/5 stars
All About Jazz	3.5/5 stars
DownBeat	2.5/5 stars
Concerto	4.5/5 stars
Jazz Journal	3.5/5 stars
Sk.jazz	4/5 stars
Jazzport	8.5/10 stars
JazzWax	
Chicago Jazz Magazine	
Salt Peanuts	
Jazzrytmit	
Jazz Hot	
JazzdaGama	

The Jazz Journal review by Brian Morton awarded the album 3½ stars and simply states: "If your paradigm of jazz is themes-and-solos, then this one will be meat and drink. It’s another great set from Magris, who doesn't seem to put a foot wrong when JMood call him in." The All About Jazz review by Jerome Wilson awarded the album 3 ½ stars and simply states: "This particular group is steeped in the jazz traditions of the Fifties and Sixties, echoing McCoy Tyner, Art Blakey and Horace Silver at different points. It plays within the confines of familiar jazz territory, but with soul and power." The Chicago Jazz Magazine review by Hrayr Attarian simply states: "“Effervescent,” “sophisticated,” and “stimulating” are three adjectives that immediately come to mind when asked to describe pianist Roberto Magris’ Sun Stone."

== Track listing ==
1. Sun Stone (Roberto Magris) - 9:34
2. Innamorati a Milano (Memo Remigi) - 9:23
3. Planet of Love (Roberto Magris) - 7:56
4. Maliblues (Roberto Magris) - 11:00
5. Beauty is Forever! (Roberto Magris) - 7:45
6. Look at the Stars (Roberto Magris) - 11:24
7. Sun Stone II (Roberto Magris) - 9:31

== Personnel ==
=== Musicians ===
- Shareef Clayton - trumpet
- Ira Sullivan - alto sax, soprano sax, flute
- Mark Colby - tenor sax
- Roberto Magris - piano
- Jamie Ousley - bass
- Rodolfo Zuniga - drums

=== Production ===
- Paul Collins – executive producer and co-producer
- Edward Blanco – co-producer
- Carlos Alvarez – engineering
- Abe Goldstien – design
- Paul Collins and Nadja Debenjak – photography
