= Current Views =

Live album by Roberto Magris & The Europlane Orchestra
- Released: 2009
- Recorded: November 23, 2001, September 20, 2002, and July 21, 2003
- Venue: Casa della Musica Trieste, Italy, and Teatro Gustavo da Modena, Palmanova, Italy
- Genre: Jazz
- Length: 63:28
- Label: Soul Note (121425-OD)
- Producer: Roberto Magris

Roberto Magris chronology
| Restless Spirits – Big Band Ritmo-Sinfonica Città di Verona plays the music of Roberto Magris (2009) | Current Views (2009) | Mating Call (2010) |

Professional ratings
Review scores
| Source | Rating |
|---|---|
| All Music | 3.5/5 stars |
| All About Jazz | 4.5/5 stars |
| All About Jazz | 4/5 stars |
| All About Jazz | 4.5/5 stars |
| The Pittsburgh Tribune-Review | |
| The Penguin Guide to Jazz Recordings | 3.5/4 stars |

Current Views is an album by jazz pianist Roberto Magris released on the Soul Note label in 2009, and featuring performances by Roberto Magris & The Europlane Orchestra with Philip Catherine, Bill Molenhof, Roberto Ottaviano and others.

== Reception ==
The All Music review by Michael G. Nastos awarded the album 3 ½ stars and simply states: "Inspired by various American jazz influences, Italian pianist Roberto Magris presents an ambitious, live, in-concert program with his Europlane Orchestra. The music is expansive and broad based, charted and arranged quite heavily while allowing solo space with harmonic nuances that at times sound electronic. Magris himself seems always inspired as a post-McCoy Tyner modal modernist, and his band follows suit for this powerful statement of new jazz wine sealed in old ornate bottles."

== Track listing ==
1. The Story Teller (Roberto Magris) – 12:08
2. Dukish Interlude (Roberto Magris) – 9:37
3. In Love In Vain (Robin/Kern) – 7:01
4. Hombres (Roberto Magris) – 10:10
5. React! (Roberto Magris) – 10:33
6. Steady Mood (Roberto Magris) – 9:07
7. For Naima (Roberto Magris) – 4:49

== Personnel ==
=== Musicians ===
- Julius Baros – trumpet (on # 7)
- Ondrej Jurasi – trumpet (on # 1)
- Kristof Bacso – alto sax (on # 2–6)
- Rado Tariska – alto sax (on # 7)
- Marko Lackner – alto sax (on # 7)
- Roberto Ottaviano – soprano sax and tenor sax (on # 2–6)
- Marco Castelli – soprano sax (on # 1) and tenor sax (on # 7)
- Christian Muenchinger – tenor sax (on # 2–6)
- Lojze Krajncan – trombone (on # 1)
- Ferenc Schreck – trombone (on # 7)
- Philip Catherine – guitar (on # 1)
- Darko Jurkovic – guitar (on # 7)
- Bill Molenhof – vibraphone (on # 2–6)
- Roberto Magris – piano
- Vitold Rek – bass (on # 2–6)
- František Uhlíř – bass (on #i 1, 7)
- Gabriele Centis – drums

=== Production ===
- Roberto Magris – producer
- Flavio Bonandrini – executive producer
- Fulvio Zafret – engineering
