= Need to Bring Out Love =

Studio album by Roberto Magris
- Released: 2016
- Recorded: October 29, 2013, and November 3, 2014
- Studios: Chapman Recording Studio; Lenexa, Kansas
- Genre: Jazz
- Length: 56:39
- Labels: JMood Records; JM-13
- Producer: Paul Collins

Roberto Magris chronology
Enigmatix (2015)	Need to Bring Out Love (2016)	Prague After Dark (2017)

Professional ratings
Review scores
Source	Rating
All About Jazz	4.5/5 stars
All About Jazz	3.5/5 stars
Jazz Journal	4/5 stars
Cadence	
All About Jazz	
JazzdaGama	
Jazz Podium	
Jazz Hot	

Need to Bring Out Love is an album by jazz pianist Roberto Magris released on the JMood Records label in 2016, featuring performances by Magris with his trio from Kansas City.

== Reception ==
The All About Jazz review by Edward Blanco awarded the album 4 ½ stars and simply states: " As sequels go, Need to Bring Out Love brings out all the musical love one needs to hear with the same electrifying and swinging excitement as the first album. The music and performance found here, serve as yet another vehicle for the immeasurable skills and talents of pianist and composer Roberto Magris undeniably, one of the finest piano players on the planet." The Jazz Journal review by Brian Morton awarded the album 4 stars and simply states: " As a free-standing album, it’s terrific; as a sequel of last year’s Enigmatix, still better. Superb."

== Track listing ==
1. Out There Somewhere (Roberto Magris) - 7:14
2. Joycie Girl (Don Pullen) - 8:34
3. I Want To Talk About You (Billy Eckstine) - 5:49
4. Swami Blues (Roberto Magris) - 7:23
5. Candlewood Dreams (Roberto Magris) - 5:05
6. What Love (Roberto Magris) - 9:51
7. Together in Love (Roberto Magris) - 3:55
8. Need To Bring Out Love (Roberto Magris) - 5:39
9. Audio Notebook - 2:40

== Personnel ==
=== Musicians ===
- Roberto Magris - piano
- Dominique Sanders - bass
- Brian Steever - drums
- Julia Haile - vocal (on # 3, 8)
- Monique Danielle - vocal (on # 7)

=== Production ===
- Paul Collins – executive producer and producer
- George Hunt – engineering
- Daria Lacy – design
- Jerry Lockett and Nadja Debenjak – photography
