= World Gardens =

Studio album by Roberto Magris
- Released: 2018
- Recorded: September 29, 2015, and November 1, 2016
- Studios: Chapman Recording Studio, Lenexa, Kansas
- Genre: Jazz
- Length: 77:01
- Labels: JMood Records; JM-16
- Producer: Paul Collins

Roberto Magris chronology
Live in Miami @ The WDNA Jazz Gallery (2017)	World Gardens (2018)	Sun Stone (2019)

World Gardens is an album by jazz pianist Roberto Magris released on the JMood Records label in 2018, featuring performances by Magris with his trio from Kansas City.

== Reception ==
Professional ratings
Review scores
Source	Rating
All About Jazz	4/5 stars
All About Jazz	3.5/5 stars
Concerto	4/5 stars
Jazz ‘n More	4/5 stars
JazzWax	
JazzdaGama	
Chicago Jazz Magazine	
IAJRC Journal	
Salt Peanuts	
Jazzrytmit	

The All About Jazz review by Dan McClenaghan awarded the album 4 stars and called its content "a variety of beautiful musical flowers", while the more subdued All About Jazz review by Jerome Wilson awarded the album 3 ½ stars and noted it as "a fine representation of the scope and joy of (Magris's) piano abilities."

== Track listing ==
1. Never Can Say Goodbye (Clifton Davis) - 6:20
2. Pilgrim (Lackner/Nievergelt/Perkins) - 7:50
3. Blue Bamboo (Yunnan folk song) - 9:12
4. Another More Blues (Roberto Magris) - 5:13
5. Song for an African Child (Roberto Magris) - 7:56
6. Blues at Lunch! (Roberto Magris) - 7:49
7. Vse Najlepse Rozice / All the Most Beautiful Flowers (Slovenia folk song) - 4:02
8. High Priest (Andrew Cyrille) - 6:23
9. I’m Glad There is You (Jimmy Dorsey/Paul Madeira) - 9:19
10. Stella by Starlight (Victor Young) - 9:32
11. Audio Notebook - 2:59

== Personnel ==
=== Musicians ===
- Roberto Magris - piano
- Dominique Sanders - bass
- Brian Steever - drums
- Pablo Sanhueza - congas and percussion

=== Production ===
- Paul Collins – executive producer and producer
- George Hunt and Robert Rebeck – engineering
- Abe Goldstien – design
- Giovanna Bissoli – painting
- Jerry Lockett – photography
