= Lonely Town (On the Town song) =

1944 song by Leonard Bernstein

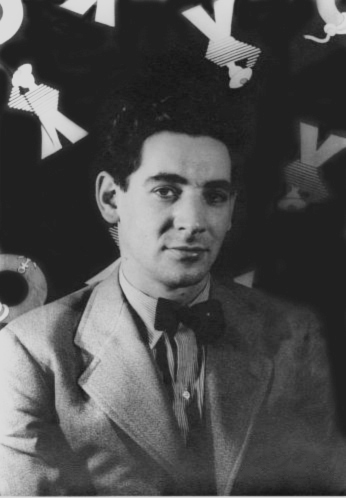
Leonard Bernstein in 1944

"Lonely Town" is a song from the 1944 musical On the Town. It was composed by Leonard Bernstein with lyrics by Adolph Green and Betty Comden.

== Background ==
It is performed in Scene 7 of Act 1 of the musical by the character Gabey, a sailor on shore leave, in the musical as he laments his loneliness despite being in the crowds of New York City. It is the first solo number performed by one of the principal characters in the musical. The song is formed of an AABAB structure. The song segues into the "Lonely Town Pas de Deux" ballet in the musical in which Gabey watches other sailors dance with girls while he is alone. A new verse was created when it was released as sheet music as the original verse contained too many references to the specific plot of the musical. The song includes fragments of the song "New York, New York" from the musical. "Lonely Town" is one of the three principal ballads of the show alongside "Lucky to Be Me" and "Some Other Time". The song had developed from "Lonely Me", of which the lyrics only exist.

The Boston Herald critic Elinor Hughes felt that "Lonely Town" was one of the few songs from the musical that would be "most likely to be remembered".

Frank Sinatra starred in the 1947 film version of the musical with Gene Kelly, and believed that he was going to perform the song in the film though in the musical it had been written for Kelly's character. Comden recalled that Sinatra was "very, very angry" upon being told on the last day of shooting that the song was not to be included.

In his biography of Sinatra, Sinatra! The Song Is You: A Singer's Art, Will Friedwald wrote that Sinatra and Gordon Jenkins considered the song the "high point" of Sinatra's 1957 album arranged by Jenkins, Where Are You?, and describes the song as a "heavy, moving ballad".

"Lonely Town" was performed by Shirley Horn on Charlie Haden's 1999 album The Art of the Song, in an arrangement by Alan Broadbent. Broadbent won the Grammy Award for Best Instrumental Arrangement Accompanying Vocalist(s) at the 42nd Annual Grammy Awards in 2000.

== Recordings ==
- Maynard Ferguson – Dimensions (EmArcy, 1955)
- Frank Sinatra – Where Are You? (Capitol, 1957)
- Tommy Flanagan – Lonely Town (Blue Note, 1959)
- Blossom Dearie – Blossom Dearie Sings Comden and Green (Verve, 1959)
- Mel Tormé – Mel Tormé Swings Shubert Alley (Verve, 1960)
- Gerry Mulligan – Jeru (Columbia, 1962)
- Freddie Hubbard – First Light (CTI, 1971)
- Jaki Byard – There'll Be Some Changes Made (Muse, 1972)
- On the Town (Deutsche Grammophon, 1994)
- Shirley Horn with Charlie Haden – The Art of the Song (Polygram, 1999)
- Roberto Magris – Mating Call (JMood, 2010)
- Barry Manilow – Songs of New York (Decca), 2017
- Kurt Elling – The Questions (Okeh Records, 2018)
