= An Evening with Herb Geller & The Roberto Magris Trio – Live in Europe 2009 =

Live album by Herb Geller & Roberto Magris
- Released: 2014
- Recorded: November 19, 2009, and December 6, 2009
- Venues: Novi Sad Jazz Festival Serbia, Porgy & Bess, Vienna, Austria
- Genre: Jazz
- Length: 56:34
- Labels: JMood Records; JM-12
- Producer: Roberto Magris

Roberto Magris chronology
Morgan Rewind: A Tribute to Lee Morgan Vol. 2 (2013)	An Evening with Herb Geller & The Roberto Magris Trio – Live in Europe 2009 (2014)	Enigmatix (2015)

An Evening With Herb Geller & The Roberto Magris Trio – Live In Europe 2009 is an album by jazz saxophonist Herb Geller and pianist Roberto Magris recorded live in 2009 at the Jazz Festival in Novi Sad, Serbia, and at the Porgy & Bess jazz club in Vienna, Austria, released on the JMood Records label in 2014.

== Reception ==
Professional ratings
Review scores
Source	Rating
All About Jazz	5/5 stars
All About Jazz	5/5 stars
All About Jazz	4.5/5 stars
Jazz Journal	4/5 stars
Jazz Hot	
Cadence	
New York City Jazz Record	
Jazz Inside Magazine	
JazzdaGama	
Rifftides	
Jazzrytmit	
Orkester Journalen	
Jazz Podium	
Doctor Jazz Magazine	

The All About Jazz review by C. Michael Bailey awarded the album 5 stars and simply states: "An Evening with Herb Geller & the Roberto Magris Trio: Live in Europe 2009 is the result of some saved tapes and audio magic, displaying Geller in full possession of his facilities at 81-years old in 2009. Geller is captured closely, often revealing a dry, reedy tone that betrays the comfort of familiarity. A master of melody and the simple improvisation thereof, listening to Geller is like a relaxing walk down a path walked many times before. The pianist plays and leads beautifully, or more properly, allows Geller to do so." The All About Jazz review by Jack Bowers awarded the album 5 stars and simply states: "On An Evening with Herb Geller the saxophonist is backed by the splendid Italian pianist Roberto Magris and his working trio on what may be Geller's last recording (he died four years later, on December 19, 2013). Geller plays like a musician many years his junior; the technique is as clean and sharp as ever, the intonation strong, the flow of ideas fresh and abundant. While Geller swings throughout, he is shadowed closely by Magris whose nimble approach to the keyboard is equaled by his exemplary sense of time and large reservoir of engaging ad-libs."

== Track listing ==
1. After You (Cole Porter) - 5:47
2. El Cajon (Johnny Mandel) - 6:03
3. Lonely Woman (Benny Carter) - 8:21
4. The Red Door (Zoot Sims) - 4:46
5. Orson (Billy Strayhorn) - 5:13
6. Upper Manhattan Medical Group (Billy Strayhorn) - 4:32
7. Celebrating Bird (Herb Geller) - 2:52
8. 9:20 Special (Earle Warren) - 4:17
9. If I Were a Bell (Frank Loesser) - 5:09
10. The Peacocks (Jimmy Rowles) - 4:17
11. Pretty Woman (Stephen Sondheim) - 5:17

== Personnel ==
=== Musicians ===
- Herb Geller – alto sax
- Roberto Magris - piano
- Nikola Matosic - bass
- Enzo Carpentieri - drums

=== Production ===
- Roberto Magris – producer
- Paul Collins – executive producer
- Stephen Bocioaca – design
- Michele Giotto – photography
