= One Night in with Hope and More Vol. 2 =

Studio album by Roberto Magris Trio
- Released: 2013
- Recorded: December 15, 2009 and November 1, 2010 - bonus track: December 6, 2008
- Studios: Chapman Recording Studio, Lenexa, Kansas - bonus track: Mad Dog Studios Burbank, California
- Genre: Jazz
- Length: 63:22
- Labels: JMood Records; JM-08
- Producer: Paul Collins

Roberto Magris chronology
Cannonball Funk'n Friends (2013)	One Night in with Hope and More Vol. 2 (2013)	Morgan Rewind: A Tribute to Lee Morgan Vol. 2 (2014)

One Night in with Hope and More Vol. 2 is an album by jazz pianist Roberto Magris released on the JMood Records label in 2013, featuring performances by the Roberto Magris Trio with Elisa Pruett and Albert “Tootie” Heath (2009 session), and with Elisa Pruett and Brian Steever (2010 session).

== Reception ==
Professional ratings
Review scores
Source	Rating
All About Jazz	4/5 stars
All About Jazz	4.5/5 stars
Orkester Journalen	3/5 stars
Cadence	
Jazz Hot	

The All About Jazz review by Edward Blanco awarded the album 4½ stars and simply states: "The Roberto Magris Trio forges a remarkable musical statement on One Night in with Hope and More Vol. 2, revisiting and reviving the wonderful music of jazz pianists and bebop masters of the past, with a classic performance and masterful play from one of the best bebop jazz pianist of today." The All About Jazz review by C. Michael Bailey awarded the album 4 stars and simply states: "Magris closes out his long night of recording hard bop in the vein of Hope with a collection containing compositions by Herbie Nichols, Randy Weston, as well as several original pieces in the chosen vernacular. Magris' approach remains straight-ahead, seasoned with his potent and well-trained playing."

== Track listing ==
1. Third World (Herbie Nichols) - 5:21
2. Young and Foolish (Albert Hague) - 8:50
3. Makanda (Roberto Magris) - 5:04
4. Dianna (Ken McIntyre) - 4:45
5. Mal Waldron's Dreams (Roberto Magris) - 6:24
6. Little Susan (Randy Weston) - 3:42
7. Theme from the “Odd Couple” (Neal Hefti) - 6:35
8. Burbank Turnaround (Roberto Magris) - 4:25
9. I Can't Give You Anything But Love (Fields/McHugh) - 5:28
10. Bonus track: Possessed Me (Roberto Magris) - 7:56
11. Audio Notebook - 4:25

== Personnel ==
=== Musicians ===
- Roberto Magris - piano
- Elisa Pruett - bass
- Albert “Tootie” Heath - drums (on 1, 5, 7, 8, 9)
- Brian Steever – drums (on 2, 3, 4, 6)

on the bonus track

- Paul Carr – tenor sax
- Roberto Magris – piano
- Elisa Pruett – bass
- Idris Muhammad – drums

=== Production ===
- Paul Collins – executive producer and producer
- George Hunt – engineering
- Samur Khouja and Eric Corne – engineering (bonus track)
- Stephen Bocioaca – design
- Jerry Lockett and Martin Magris – photography
