= One Night in with Hope and More Vol. 1 =

Studio album by Roberto Magris Trio
- Released: 2012
- Recorded: December 15, 2009
- Studios: Chapman Recording Studio, Lenexa, Kansas
- Genre: Jazz
- Length: 58:59
- Labels: JMood Records; JM-03
- Producer: Paul Collins

Roberto Magris chronology
| Morgan Rewind: A Tribute to Lee Morgan Vol. 1 (2011) | One Night in with Hope and More Vol. 1 (2012) | Aliens in a Bebop Planet (2012) |

One Night in with Hope and More Vol. 1 is an album by jazz pianist Roberto Magris released on the JMood Records label in 2012, featuring performances by the Roberto Magris Trio with Elisa Pruett and Albert “Tootie” Heath.

== Reception ==
Professional ratings
Review scores
| Source | Rating |
|---|---|
| World Music Report | 4/5 stars |
| All About Jazz | 4.5/5 stars |
| Concerto | 4/5 stars |
| Orkester Journalen | 4/5 stars |
| All About Jazz | |

The World Music Report review by Paul J. Youngman awarded the album 4 stars and simply states: "Most striking on this album is Roberto Magris’ fluency in combining technique with melody in an unencumbered manner. Sounding effortless, an ease of semplicity, yet runs and mighty chords are struck with spot on precision." The All About Jazz review by C. Michael Bailey simply states: "This disc is not a rote homage to hard bop so much as it is an attentive appreciation rendered by three like-minded musicians recalling a heyday long gone."

== Track listing ==
1. Happy Hour (Elmo Hope) - 4:00
2. If You Could See Me Now Tadd Dameron) - 7:09
3. Theme from “The Pawnbroker” (Quincy Jones/Billy Byers) - 5:49
4. I Didn't Know About You (Duke Ellington) - 5:22
5. Elmo's Delight (Roberto Magris) - 4:42
6. Half May (Herb Geller) - 4:43
7. East 9th Street (Andrew Hill) - 9:12
8. My Heart Stood Still (Rodgers/Hart) - 6:11
9. Fire Waltz (Mal Waldron) - 7:27
10. Audio Liner Notes - 4:24

== Personnel ==
=== Musicians ===
- Roberto Magris - piano
- Elisa Pruett - bass
- Albert “Tootie” Heath - drums

=== Production ===
- Paul Collins – executive producer and producer
- George Hunt – engineering
- Stephen Bocioaca – design
- Jerry Lockett and Martin Magris – photography
