= Aliens in a Bebop Planet =

Studio album by Roberto Magris Star Trek
- Released: 2012
- Recorded: February 26, 2012
- Studios: Chapman Recording Studio, Lenexa, Kansas
- Genre: Jazz
- Length: 116:53 (2 CD)
- Labels: JMood Records; JM-04
- Producer: Paul Collins

Roberto Magris chronology
One Night in with Hope and More Vol. 1 (2012)	Aliens in a Bebop Planet (2012)	Ready for Reed - Sam Reed Meets Roberto Magris (2013)

Aliens in a Bebop Planet is a double album by jazz pianist Roberto Magris released on the JMood Records label in 2012, featuring performances by Magris with his Space Trek from Kansas City.

== Reception ==
Professional ratings
Review scores
Source	Rating
DownBeat	3.5/5 stars
Orkester Journalen	4/5 stars
Concerto	4/5 stars
All About Jazz	

The DownBeat review by John Ephland awarded the album 3 ½ stars and simply states: "Aliens in a Bebop Planet has the feel of a musical theater revue, but that doesn’t come through until the very end. Before that, we are treated to a variety of mainstream jazz styles. As for the title of the package, a better one might be Beboppers on an Alien Planet. But kicking it all off is a signature sound on piano that suggests yet another 'planet'”.

== Track listing ==
CD 1

1. Blues Clues on the Lunar Sand (Roberto Magris) – 4:33
2. Across the Borders / Beyond the Faith (Roberto Magris) – 6:44
3. A Night in Cydonia (Roberto Magris) – 5:12
4. Nostalgia (Fats Navarro) – 4:26
5. On Cloud Nine (Roberto Magris) – 6:05
6. Sat (Roberto Magris) – 6:45
7. Robbin's Space Bolero (Sir Charles Thompson) – 7:01
8. Aliens in a Bebop Planet Roberto (Magris) – 5:23
9. Chachanada (Roberto Magris) – 6:35

CD 2

1. New Cos City (PJ Aubree Collins/Roberto Magris) – 4:33
2. Signals and Prayers (Roberto Magris) – 4:08
3. The Gypsy (Billy Reid) – 5:32
4. Nobody Knows (Kenny Clarke) – 3:47
5. Cosmic Storyville (Roberto Magris) – 3:42
6. Giant Steps (John Coltrane) – 5:07
7. Rhythms from the Floating Space (Roberto Magris) – 3:14
8. On Cloud Nine Duet (Roberto Magris) – 6:12
9. Saturn Sun Ra (Roberto Magris) – 3:54
10. Audio Notebook – 19:00

== Personnel ==
=== Musicians ===
- Matt Otto – tenor sax
- Roberto Magris – piano
- Dominique Sanders – bass
- Brian Steever – drums
- Pablo Sanhueza – congas and percussion (on # 3, 4, 6–9, 11, 12, 16, 18)
- Eddie Charles – vocal (on # 8, 10, 13)

=== Production ===
- Paul Collins – executive producer and producer
- George Hunt – engineering
- Stephen Bocioaca – design
- Jerry Lockett – photography
