= In Action =

In Action may refer to:

- In Action, a 1960 album by Little Willie John
- In Action, a 1962 album by The Chad Mitchell Trio
- In Action (Menudo album)
- In Action (Johnny Rivers album)
- In Action (Roberto Magris album), 2026
- In Action (EP), an EP by We Are Scientists
- Mary-Kate and Ashley in Action!, a 26-episode TV series about the Olsen twins
