= Morgan Rewind: A Tribute to Lee Morgan Vol. 1 =

Studio album by Roberto Magris Quintet
- Released: 2011
- Recorded: December 14, 2009
- Studios: Chapman Recording Studio, Lenexa, Kansas
- Genre: Jazz
- Length: 72:02
- Labels: JMood Records; JM-02
- Producer: Paul Collins

Roberto Magris chronology
| Mating Call (2010) | Morgan Rewind: A Tribute to Lee Morgan Vol. 1 (2011) | One Night in with Hope and More Vol. 1 (2012) |

Morgan Rewind: A Tribute To Lee Morgan, Vol. 1 is an album by jazz pianist Roberto Magris released on the JMood Records label in 2011, featuring performances by the Roberto Magris Quintet with Brandon Lee, Logan Richardson, Elisa Pruett and Albert “Tootie” Heath.

== Reception ==
Professional ratings
Review scores
| Source | Rating |
|---|---|
| All About Jazz | 4.5/5 stars |
| All About Jazz | 4/5 stars |
| All About Jazz | 3.5/5 stars |
| Jazzreview | 5/5 stars |
| Concerto | 4/5 stars |
| Orkester Journalen | 3/5 stars |

The All About Jazz review by Edward Blanco awarded the album 4½ stars and simply states: "Morgan Rewind is an impressive musical tribute to a legendary artist whose influence is still felt today. The whole band plays hot and heavy on this decidedly hard bop selection, containing firm stick play from Heath, tasty lines from the leader and hard blowing from the horns." The All About Jazz review by Jerry D’Souza awarded the album 4 stars and simply states: "It would have been facile to imitate the originals, but Magris gives the Morgan compositions fresh details and a sense of purpose making this a sincere tribute. With outstanding musicianship added to the mix, Morgan Rewind has many engaging pleasures." The New York City Jazz Record review by Donald Elfman simply states: "These players have the temperament, the sound and the passion to make these tunes come alive."

== Track listing ==
1. Croquet Ballet (Billy Harper) - 5:32
2. Party Time (Lee Morgan) - 8:29
3. Desert Moonlight (Lee Morgan) - 5:28
4. Lee-Too (Roberto Magris) - 5:56
5. Ceora (Lee Morgan) - 6:41
6. Hocus Pocus (Lee Morgan) - 6:55
7. Eclipso (Lee Morgan) - 6:12
8. Mr. Kenyatta (Lee Morgan) - 6:04
9. Lee Morganized (Roberto Magris) - 8:21
10. Audio Liner Notes - 12:03

== Personnel ==
=== Musicians ===
- Brandon Lee – trumpet
- Logan Richardson – alto sax
- Roberto Magris - piano
- Elisa Pruett - bass
- Albert “Tootie” Heath - drums

=== Production ===
- Paul Collins – executive producer and producer
- George Hunt – engineering
- Daria Lacy – design
- Jerry Lockett – photography
