= Cannonball Funk'n Friends =

Studio album by Roberto Magris Quintet
- Released: 2013
- Recorded: November 3, 2010
- Studios: Chapman Recording Studio, Lenexa, Kansas
- Genres: Jazz; jazz-funk; soul jazz
- Length: 65:23
- Labels: JMood Records; JM-05
- Producer: Paul Collins

Roberto Magris chronology
| Ready for Reed - Sam Reed Meets Roberto Magris (2013) | Cannonball Funk'n Friends (2013) | One Night in with Hope and More Vol. 2 (2013) |

Cannonball Funk’n Friends is an album by jazz pianist Roberto Magris released on the JMood Records label in 2013, featuring performances by the Roberto Magris Quintet with Hermon Mehari, Jim Mair, Dominique Sanders and Alonzo "Scooter" Powell. The album is a tribute to saxophonist Cannonball Adderley and his jazz-funk and soul jazz bands.

== Reception ==
Professional ratings
Review scores
| Source | Rating |
|---|---|
| All About Jazz | 3.5/5 stars |
| Orkester Journalen | 3/5 stars |
| Ken Franckling Jazznotes | |

The All About Jazz review by Jack Bowers awarded the album 3½ stars and simply states: "In choosing music for the quintet, Magris focused on 'the groovy side' of Cannonball Adderley's songbook. The mood is cheeky and aggressive from start to finish, and everyone plays well within that framework. What the album does not have, of course, is either of the Adderley brothers, and so it is missing the deep-rooted ebullience they would bring to any such enterprise. Aside from that, an astute and listenable session."

== Track listing ==
1. Jeannine (Duke Pearson) – 9:45
2. Blue Daniel (Frank Rosolino) – 5:34
3. Sticks (Julian "Cannonball" Adderley) – 7:17
4. Saudade (Walter Booker) – 8:22
5. Bohemia After Dark (Oscar Pettiford) – 5:32
6. Keep Headed in the Right Direction (Roberto Magris) – 8:13
7. Arriving Soon (Eddie Vinson) – 8:12
8. Outback Special (Roberto Magris) – 8:37
9. Audio Liner Notes – 3:48

== Personnel ==
=== Musicians ===
- Hermon Mehari – trumpet, cornet
- Jim Mair – alto sax
- Roberto Magris - piano, Hammond organ
- Dominique Sanders - electric bass
- Alonzo “Scooter” Powell - drums

=== Production ===
- Paul Collins – executive producer and producer
- George Hunt – engineering
- Stephen Bocioaca – design
- Jerry Lockett and Naima Magris – photography
