= Richard Cook (journalist) =

British writer and magazine editor (1957–2007)

- Born: Richard David Cook; 7 February 1957; Kew, Surrey, England
- Died: 25 August 2007 (aged 50); London, England
- Other names: R. D. Cook
- Occupations: Jazz writer; magazine editor
- Notable work: Richard Cook's Jazz Encyclopedia

Richard David Cook (7 February 1957 – 25 August 2007) was a British jazz writer, magazine editor and former record company executive. Sometimes credited as R. D. Cook, Cook was born in Kew, Surrey, and lived in west London as an adult. A writer on music from the late 1970s until he died, Cook was co-author, with Brian Morton, of The Penguin Guide to Jazz Recordings, which lasted for ten editions until 2010. His other books included Richard Cook's Jazz Encyclopedia, Blue Note Records: The Biographyand, and It's About That Time: Miles Davis On and Off the Record.

== Career ==
Cook began as a staff writer for New Musical Express (NME) in the early 1980s. NME's editor at the time, Neil Spencer, commented that he "would take on the pieces that the fashion-oriented shunned – a Roxy Music review, an audience with a fading star, a piece on the emergent sounds of Africa". He was later the jazz critic for The Sunday Times and a music writer for the New Statesman. Cook was formerly editor of The Wire, when it was a jazz-centred periodical (it broadened its coverage towards the end of his editorship), and edited Jazz Review magazine from its foundation in 1998. Jazz Review continued for a time after his death, using Cook's approach to the music as continuing inspiration; it did not name a specific successor (Morton) for six months. Cook also presented a programme on jazz for BBC local radio GLR.

Cook was the UK jazz catalogue manager for PolyGram (1992–97) and also produced albums by the trumpeter Guy Barker. During his spell at PolyGram, Cook launched the short-lived "Redial" re-issue line of classic British jazz albums. In 2002, he was responsible for issuing a 10-CD limited-edition set by the American avant-garde pianist Cecil Taylor of 1990 recordings, 2 Ts for a Lovely T, on the Codanza label.

== Death ==
Cook died from bowel and liver cancer on 25 August 2007, aged 50, in London, a year after diagnosis.
