= Music of Today =

Studio album by Roberto Magris & The D.I. Project
- Released: 1991
- Recorded: June 25, 1990
- Studio: MTS Tonstudio, Albstadt, Germany
- Genre: Jazz
- Length: 49:13
- Label: Splasc(h) (H 355-2)
- Producer: Roberto Magris and Peppo Spagnoli

Roberto Magris chronology
Life in Israel (1990)	Music of Today (1991)	Maliblues (1994)

Roberto Magris & The D.I. Project: Music of Today is an album by jazz pianist Roberto Magris recorded in Germany and released on the Splasc(h) label in 1991, featuring performances by Magris with a German-Italian jazz ensemble.

== Reception ==
Professional ratings
Review scores
Source	Rating
AllMusic	4/5 stars

The AllMusic review by Thom Jurek states: "Magris employs a group of mixed Europeans in charting his inner space where classical formalism meets post-hard bop jazz and free modalism. He writes from the point of view of sound first and then individual instrumentation, taking a macro view of the tonal and lyrical picture, and he succeeds magnificently."

== Track listing ==
1. The Way Inside (Roberto Magris) - 12:11
2. All The Mothers’ Love (Roberto Magris) - 2:19
3. Restless Spirits (Roberto Magris) - 16:02
4. Psico-estasi (Roberto Magris) - 7:23
5. Martin’s Jump (Roberto Magris) - 10:48

== Personnel ==
=== Musicians ===
- Martin Klingeberg – trumpet, vocal
- Marco Castelli – tenor sax, soprano sax
- Achim Goettert-Zadek – tenor sax, soprano sax
- Joerg Drewing – trombone
- Albrecht Riermeyer – vibraphone
- Roberto Magris – piano
- Rudi Engel – bass
- Davide Ragazzoni – drums

=== Production ===
- Roberto Magris and Peppo Spagnoli – executive producer and producer
- Thomas Krueger – engineering
- Peppo Spagnoli – design
