= Kansas City Outbound =

Studio album by Roberto Magris Trio
- Released: 2008
- Recorded: July 2 and 3, 2007
- Studios: Chapman Recording Studio, Kansas City, Missouri
- Genre: Jazz
- Length: 65:42
- Labels: JMood Records; JM-00
- Producer: Paul Collins

Roberto Magris chronology
Alfabeats Nu Jazz - Stones (2006)	Kansas City Outbound (2008)	Mating Call (2010)

Kansas City Outbound is an album by jazz pianist Roberto Magris released on the JMood Records label in 2008, featuring performances by the Roberto Magris Trio with Art Davis, Jimmy “Junebug” Jackson and Zack Albetta. This album is also the final recording of bassist Art Davis.

== Reception ==
Professional ratings
Review scores
Source	Rating
All About Jazz	4/5 stars
Jazzreview	4/5 stars
All About Jazz	
Pittsburgh Tribune-Review	
Jazz Chronicles	
Citizen Jazz	

The Jazzreview review by Paul J. Youngman awarded the album 4 stars, observing that it "starts out dark and deep with a hard bop sensibility (and) progresses through the blues", and particularly lauding Magris's keyboard skills. The All About Jazz review by Dan McClenaghan awarded the album 4 stars, and ranked the album "on the top shelf, gleaming with the best of them."

== Track listing ==
1. Kansas City Outbound (Roberto Magris) - 3:24
2. I Fall in Love Too Easily (Cahn/Styne) - 8:38
3. Iraqi Blues (Roberto Magris) - 7:09
4. A Flower is a Lovesome Thing (Billy Strayhorn) - 4:22
5. KC Inbound (Roberto Magris) - 3:25
6. Reverend du Bop (Andrew Hill) - 7:38
7. Rainbow Eyes (Roberto Magris) - 3:21
8. Bemsha Swing (Thelonious Monk) - 5:21
9. Lonely Woman (Benny Carter) - 4:02
10. Darn That Dream (Burke/Van Heusen) - 6:43
11. Alone Together (Dietz/Schwartz) - 6:30
12. Bye Bye Baby (Cahn/Styne) - 5:06

== Personnel ==
=== Musicians ===
- Roberto Magris - piano
- Art Davis - bass
- Jimmy “Junebug” Jackson - drums (on 1, 2, 3, 8)
- Zack Albetta - drums (on 5, 6, 7, 10, 11, 12)

=== Production ===
- Paul Collins – producer
- Justin Mantooth – engineering
- Jerry Lockett – photography
