= Match Point (Roberto Magris album) =

Studio album by Roberto Magris
- Released: 2021
- Recorded: December 8, 2018
- Studios: Criteria Studios/The Hit Factory, Miami, Florida
- Genre: Jazz
- Length: 75:16
- Labels: JMood Records; JM-19
- Producer: Paul Collins

Roberto Magris chronology
| Shuffling Ivories (2021) | Match Point (2021) | Duo & Trio (2022) |

Match Point is an album by jazz pianist Roberto Magris recorded in Miami, released on the JMood Records label in 2021.

== Reception ==
Professional ratings
Review scores
| Source | Rating |
|---|---|
| Los Angeles Jazz Scene | |
| Jazz Hot | |
| Aoide Magazine | |
| Concerto | 5/5 stars |
| Coleurs Jazz | |
| Jersey Jazz Magazine | |
| All About Jazz | 4/5 stars |
| Jazz World Quest | |
| Jazz’halo | |

The Los Angeles Jazz Scene review by Scott Yanow simply states: "Match Point is one of Roberto Magris’ strongest releases to date and is highly recommended to straight ahead jazz fans." The Aoide Magazine review by Eric Harabadian simply states: "This is one of Magris’ finest ensembles and a truly inspired selection of material blending straight ahead post-modern bop, with Latin rhythms and textures."

== Track listing ==
1. Yours Is The Light (Richard Kermode) - 10:37
2. Search For Peace (McCoy Tyner) - 15:00
3. The Insider (Roberto Magris) - 9:15
4. Samba For Jade (Roberto Magris) - 10:52
5. The Magic Blues (Roberto Magris) - 11:04
6. Reflections (Thelonious Monk) - 4:13
7. Caban Bamboo Highlife (Randy Weston) - 7:02
8. Match Point (Roberto Magris) - 7:09

== Personnel ==
=== Musicians ===
- Roberto Magris - piano
- Alfredo Chacon – vibraphone and congas
- Dion Kerr - bass
- Rodolfo Zuniga - drums

=== Production ===
- Paul Collins – executive producer and co-producer
- Edward Blanco – co-producer
- Carlos Alvarez – engineering
- Abe Goldstien and Jenna Beuning – design
- Paul Collins – photography
