= Prague After Dark =

Studio album by MUH Trio
- Released: 2017
- Recorded: October 9, 2016
- Studios: Studio Svarov, Svarov, Czech Republic
- Genre: Jazz
- Length: 65:37
- Labels: JMood Records; JM-15
- Producer: František Uhlíř

Roberto Magris chronology
Need to Bring out Love (2016)	Prague After Dark (2017)	Live in Miami @ The WDNA Jazz Gallery (2017)

Prague After Dark is an album by the MUH Trio (Roberto Magris/ František Uhlíř/ Jaromir Helešic Trio) recorded in the Czech Republic and released on the JMood Records label in 2017.

== Reception ==
Professional ratings
Review scores
Source	Rating
All About Jazz	4/5 stars
All About Jazz	4/5 stars
Jazz Journal	4/5 stars
Concerto	5/5 stars
Sk.jazz	5/5 stars
Musica	5/5 stars
Rifftides	
Boston Concert Review	
World Music Report	
JazzdaGama	
Jazzrytmit	
Jazz Podium	
Jazz Hot	

The All About Jazz review by Jack Bowers awarded the album 4 stars and simply states: "On Prague After Dark, their debut recording as a unit, these seasoned pros prove time and again that there's precious little they don't know about making lovely music together, especially when it comes to snug teamwork and swinging. Let us hope the trio remains intact and produces more recordings as bright and admirable as Prague After Dark." The All About Jazz review by C. Michael Bailey awarded the album 4 stars and simply states: "The result is a very urban European offering of mainstream jazz trio music with just enough twists and turns to keep even the most jaded listener on his or her toes." The Boston Concert Review review by Nelson Brill simply states: " Their music is all dash and sunnyness, with each partner swaggering and swinging in their collective, magnetic purpose; global-inspired music that has the capacity to freshly energize our quest for justice and global unity." The World Music Report review by Paul J. Youngman simply states: "All beautiful and thoughtfully played compositions filled with passion and simpatico that reaches out to my ear and makes this one of this year’s favourites." The Jazz Journal review by Brian Morton awarded the album 4 stars and simply states: "Magris is the most interesting bop/post-bop pianist on the current European scene, and his stature grows with each fresh recording. Another great set from super-fan Paul Collins’s label."

== Track listing ==
1. Another More Blues (Roberto Magris) - 5:46
2. Nenazvana (František Uhlíř) - 4:32
3. Third World (Herbie Nichols) - 6:19
4. Prague After Dark (Roberto Magris) - 6:33
5. Joycie Girl (Don Pullen) - 9:00
6. From Heart to Heart (František Uhlíř) - 5:31
7. Song for an African Child (Roberto Magris) - 5:54
8. A Summer's Kiss (Roberto Magris) - 7:28
9. Iraqi Blues (Roberto Magris) - 7:19
10. In Love in Vain (Robin/Kern) - 7:10

== Personnel ==
=== Musicians ===
- Roberto Magris - piano
- František Uhlíř - bass
- Jaromir Helešic - drums

=== Production ===
- František Uhlíř – producer
- Paul Collins – executive producer
- Lukas Martinek and Yarda Helesic – engineering
- Petr Sabach – design
- Bohuse Hacova – photography
