= In Action (Roberto Magris album) =

Studio album by Roberto Magris/Denis Razz Quartet
- Released: 2026
- Recorded: November 19 and 20, 2024
- Venues: Urban Recording Studio, Trieste, Italy
- Genre: Jazz
- Length: 48:23 (Cd 1) and 52:23 (Cd 2)
- Labels: JMood Records; JM-28
- Producer: Paul Collins

Roberto Magris chronology
Lovely day(s) (2025)	In Action (2026)

In Action is a double album by a quartet co-led by the Italian jazz pianist Roberto Magris and the Croatian jazz saxophonist Denis Razz released on the JMood Records in 2026. Considering that the other two members of the quartet are also Croatian, the release of this album is particularly significant for the Croatian jazz scene, marking the entry of a local ensemble into the catalog of a US label, while for Magris it is the twenty-seventh album recorded for JMood, based in Kansas City, Missouri, US.

In Action received positive reviews from critics. Some pointed out that the album covers a wide stylistic spectrum, while others stated that the Magris/Razz Quartet demonstrates that contemporary European jazz possesses a vitality that deserves attention and that its strength derives from its ability to combine local identities and global perspectives.

== Critical reception ==
Professional ratings
Review scores
Source	Rating
All About Jazz	4/5 stars
Jazz’halo	
Concerto	5/5 stars
Jazz & Mo’	
JazzHr	
Poprock	4.5/5 stars
Barikada	
Doppio Jazz	
Spettakolo	7.5/10 stars
Cinecorriere	
DT News	
Magazzino Jazz	

=== In the U.S. ===
In a review for All About Jazz, Dan McClenaghan said that "In Action finds Magris in the company of a tight-knit crew of four Croatian compadres… they have served up a strongly cohesive album, in spite of the array of different styles explored here."

=== In Europe ===
Ferdinand Dupuis-Panther of Jazz’halo said – translated from German – that "The album is a real treat for the ears, and not just for straight-ahead lovers." Patrick Auwelaert of Jazz & Mo said – translated from Dutch – that "there's something for everyone, in a variety of styles such as bop, modal, free, and spiritual jazz. The great strength of these musicians is that they know how to master these different styles so well that they sound like an organic whole." Writing for JazzHr, Davor Hrvoj said – translated from Croatian – that "The music recorded in this album represents an energetic and emotional style of jazz based on various styles, such as bebop, modal, free, and spiritual jazz, creating unique, passionate, and exciting performances." Writing for Poprock, Mladen Lončar said – translated from Croatian – that "The striking interactions between the piano, saxophone, bass, and drums create a rich tapestry of sound that keeps the listener completely captivated and engaged throughout this double release. It feels as if everything is live—making it a truly impressive experience for anyone who hears it. The album stands out with its energetic performances and thoughtful arrangements, making it a significant addition to contemporary jazz." Writing on Barikada, Dragutin Matošević said – translated from Croatian – that "The music on this album is characterized by a “conversation" between instruments, polyrhythms, and improvisation. The diversity of cultural roots and experiences of Magris and Razz's team of musicians has enriched the sound they create and presented the styles they brought with them. Roberto Magris – Denis Razz Quartet brings to the music scene a highly energetic and emotional brand of jazz based on various styles (bop, modal, free, and spiritual jazz). To be clear, they handle these differences masterfully."

=== In Italy ===
Writing for DT News, Alessandro Staiti said – translated from Italian – that "there is a direct, spontaneous approach, free of unnecessary sophistication, as if the quartet wanted to capture the energy of live performance in the studio, transforming each track into an immediate and communicative experience." Writing for Spettakolo, Raffaello Carabini said – translated from Italian – that "Magris and Razz choose the path of energy, gesture, and action: In Action is a title that leaves no room for doubt. And the quartet works like a well-oiled machine, with just the right amount of unpredictability to make everything more “human.” Writing for Magazzino Jazz, Franco Bergoglio said – translated from Italian – that “Magris and Razz know jazz history well (as can be seen from their choice of repertoire) and their craft: they exude energy, a sense of swing, a desire to explore, and soulfulness.” Writing for Cinecorriere, Antonino Ianniello said – translated from Italian – that “The four musicians create a language that goes beyond the simple sum of their individual skills, forming a true creative laboratory in which each contribution adds to the overall vision.” Writing for Doppio Jazz, Francesco Cataldo Verrina said – translated from Italian – that ““In Action” is a project that combines rigor and freedom, tradition and research, roots and movement. Its richness lies not only in the variety of repertoires or the quality of the performances, but in the ability to transform each piece into a narrative experience, a journey that invites the listener to enter a territory where form is never rigid and expression is never ornamental.”

== Track listing ==
CD 1

1. Some Other Blues (John Coltrane) – 5:07
2. In Umbra (Razumovič) – 6:38
3. Source of Life (Roberto MagrisRazumovič/Ergič) – 3:05
4. Black Nile (Wayne Shorter) – 5:28
5. Double Matrix (Roberto Magris/Ilić) – 5:02
6. Il Mare a Fiume (Roberto Magris) – 5:06
7. You Taught My Heart To Sing (McCoy Tyner) – 6:54
8. Hill of Illusions (Roberto Magris) – 4:58
9. The Plum Blossom (Yusef Lateef) – 5:29

CD 2

1. Spirits of the Wild (Roberto Magris/Razumovič/Ilić) – 3:19
2. Discipline 27-II (Sun Ra) – 4:41
3. Echoes From the Depths (Roberto Magris/Razumovič/Ergić) – 3:32
4. In Action (Roberto Magris) – 5:46
5. Lanquidity (Sun Ra) – 7:13
6. Left Alone (Mal Waldron) – 6:08
7. "A" Means Antonia (Razumovič) – 4:59
8. You'll See (Jimmy Smith) – 4:26
9. My Foolish Heart (Ned Washington/Victor Young) – 7:46
10. Audio Notebook – 3:52

== Personnel ==
=== Musicians ===
- Denis Razz – alto sax, soprano sax, flute
- Roberto Magris – piano, electric piano, keyboards, Hammond organ, Mexican whistles
- Karlo Ilič – bass, electric guitar, oud
- Rajko Ergić – drums, percussion and soprano sax (on # 3/Disc 1 and on # 3/Disc 2)

=== Production ===
- Paul Collins – executive producer and producer
- Fulvio Zafret – engineering
- Abe Goldstien – design
