= Shuffling Ivories =

Studio album by Roberto Magris & Eric Hochberg
- Released: 2021
- Recorded: November 7, 2019
- Studios: Transient Sound, Chicago, Illinois
- Genre: Jazz
- Length: 67:23
- Labels: JMood Records; JM-21
- Producer: Paul Collins

Roberto Magris chronology
A Step into Light (2020)	Shuffling Ivories (2021)	Match Point (2021)

Shuffling Ivories is a duo album by jazz pianist Roberto Magris and bassist Eric Hochberg recorded in Chicago, released on the JMood Records label in 2021.

== Reception ==
Professional ratings
Review scores
Source	Rating
All About Jazz	4/5 stars
All About Jazz	4/5 stars
Concerto	5/5 stars
Sk.jazz	4/5 stars
Jazzport	9/10 stars
Los Angeles Jazz Scene	
Jazz Hot	
Salt Peanuts	
Jazzrytmit	
Mr. Stu’s Record Room	
Jazz World Quest	
Notes on Jazz	
JazzdaGama	

The All About Jazz review by Dan McClenaghan awarded the album 4 stars and simply states: "You cannot get a sound that is more dead-center-of-the-U.S.A." The Los Angeles Jazz Scene review by Scott Yanow simply states: "Shuffling Ivories is a real standout and possibly Magris’ finest (or at least one of his most rewarding) recordings." The All About Jazz review by Edward Blanco awarded the album 4 stars and simply states: "An affirmation that when it comes to playing jazz, two can be enough." The Mr. Stu’s Record Room review by Stuart Kremsky simply states: "Shuffling Ivories is pretty much irresistible music-making from start to finish. Highly recommended." The Jazz World Quest review by Stephen Bocioaca simply states: "The flawless interplay between the two musicians is a definite asset to this enchanting album, which creatively mixes tradition and contemporary without losing the original spirit of these timeless classics." The Notes on Jazz review by Ralph A. Miriello simply states: "A delightful record that is easy to sit back with, listen to and enjoy. Just marvel at how much musical magic two instruments under the control of two talented players can produce."

== Track listing ==
1. Shuffling Ivories (Roberto Magris) - 4:06
2. I've Found a New Baby (Jack Palmer/Spencer Williams) - 4:49
3. Clef Club Jump (Roberto Magris) - 4:27
4. Memories of You (Eubie Blake) - 6:15
5. The Time Of This World Is At Hand (Gault) - 6:35
6. Quiet Dawn (Cal Massey) - 8:43
7. Laverne (Andrew Hill) - 7:20
8. Anysha (Trudy Pitts) - 7:07
9. Italy (Roberto Magris) - 5:38
10. The Chevy Chase (Eubie Blake) - 3:10
11. Laverne (Andrew Hill) - Take 2 - 9:06

== Personnel ==
=== Musicians ===
- Roberto Magris - piano
- Eric Hochberg - bass

=== Production ===
- Paul Collins – executive producer and co-producer
- Vijay Tellis-Nayak – engineering
- Abe Goldstien – design
- Paul Collins – photography
