= Love Is Passing Thru =

Studio album by Roberto Magris
- Released: 2024
- Recorded: January 26 and February 1, 2005
- Studios: Artesuono Recording Studio, Cavalicco, Udine, Italy
- Genre: Jazz
- Length: 69:32
- Labels: JMood Records; JM-23
- Producer: Roberto Magris

Roberto Magris chronology
High Quote (2023)	Love Is Passing Thru (2024)	Freedom Is Peace (2024)

Love Is Passing Thru is an album by jazz pianist Roberto Magris released on the JMood Records label in 2024, featuring performances by Magris on solo, duo, trio and quartet. This recording is from 2005, and captures his Italian quartet after they returned from a tour of the Far East. It focuses on various aspects of love and includes a variety of Balinese percussion instruments.

== Reception ==
Professional ratings
Review scores
Source	Rating
All About Jazz	4.5/5 stars
All About Jazz	4/5 stars
Concerto	5/5 stars
Jazzport	4.5/5 stars
Kathodic	9/10 stars
Sk.jazz	4.5/5 stars

The All About Jazz review by Dan McClenaghan awarded the album 4.5 stars and simply states: "Recorded in 2005, during his Soul Note days, coming off a Far East tour with his Italian working group the music presented (70-plus generous minutes) is as fresh and modern-sounding as anything he has recorded." The All About Jazz review by Edward Blanco awarded the album 4 stars and simply states: "This recording is one that truly represents Magris' experience, culture and approach to jazz as a European musician." The Aoide Magazine review by Eric Harabadian states: "This particular album focuses on various aspects of love. This is music to close your eyes and wrap your emotions in."

== Track listing ==
1. "Hair, Bee, Knee, Calls" (Roberto Magris) – 4:38
2. "Two-Sided Love" (Roberto Magris) – 10:05
3. "Love Has Passed Me by Again" (Billy Strayhorn) – 5:55
4. "You Don't Know What Love Is" (Don Raye/Gene de Paul) – 4:08
5. "Mi Sono Innamorato Di Te" (Luigi Tenco) – 2:15
6. "Estate" (Bruno Martino) – 3:39
7. "In the Days of Our Love" (Marian McPartland) – 4:32
8. "Love Came" (Strayhorn/Duke Ellington) – 7:06
9. "Jitterbug Waltz" (Fats Waller) – 5:49
10. "Orson" (Billy Strayhorn) – 5:40
11. "Lush Life – take 1" (Strayhorn) – 5:11
12. "Lush Life – take 2" (Strayhorn) – 5:29
13. "Ontet" (Gerry Mulligan) – 4:36

== Personnel ==
=== Musicians ===
- Ettore Martin – tenor sax
- Roberto Magris – piano
- Danilo Gallo – bass
- Enzo Carpentieri – drums

=== Production ===
- Paul Collins – Executive producer
- Stefano Amerio – engineering
- Abe Goldstien – design
- Fulvio Cazzador – cover painting
