= Roberto Magris =

Italian jazz pianist, composer, and arranger

- Born: 19 June 1959 (age 67); Trieste, Italy
- Genre: Jazz
- Occupations: Musician, composer, arranger, A&R director
- Instrument: Piano
- Years active: 1978–present
- Labels: Soul Note, JMood Records

Roberto Magris (born 19 June 1959) is an Italian jazz pianist, composer, and arranger.

== Early life ==
Magris was born in Trieste, Italy, on 19 June 1959. He had piano lessons between the ages of four and sixteen. He became interested in jazz after hearing the Oscar Peterson album The Way I Really Play in 1977.

== Career 1980–2000 ==
In the 1980s, he led the jazz trio Gruppo Jazz Marca and recorded three albums, Comunicazione Sonora (1982), Aria di Città (1983) and Mitteleuropa (1986), re-issued in 2006 by the English Label Arision. In 1987 he founded his Italian quartet, which operated for nearly 20 years, performing tours in Europe, Asia, Australia and South America and recording four albums, Life in Israel (issued by Jazzis), Maliblues, Live In Melbourne and Love Is Passing Thru (recorded in 2005 and issued by JMood in 2024). In the 1990s he founded the acid-jazz groups DMA Urban Jazz Funk and Alfabeats Nu Jazz, performing in Europe and in America and recording two albums, Up to the Beat (2003) and Stones (2006).

In 1998 Magris formed the Europlane Orchestra (a central-European jazz venture sponsored by INCE-CEI Central European Initiative including several jazz musicians from various European countries. With the Europlane Orchestra he recorded 3 albums, Live At Zooest, Plays Kurt Weill and Current Views (issued by Soul Note).

== Career 2000–present ==
In 2005, Magris partnered with Hungarian saxophonist Tony Lakatos on the album Check-In (issued by Soul Note). In 2006 Magris collaborated with bassist Art Davis and drummer Jimmy "Junebug" Jackson on the album Kansas City Outbound (issued by JMood). That same year, he collaborated with alto saxophonist Herb Geller on the album Il Bello del Jazz (issued by Soul Note) and some years later, the JMood released a more album with Herb Geller entitled An Evening with Herb Geller & The Roberto Magris Trio – Live in Europe 2009.

In the United States, Magris became the musical director of JMood Records and recorded two albums in tribute to the trumpeter Lee Morgan, two albums on trio with Elisa Pruett and Albert "Tootie" Heath devoted to the music of pianist Elmo Hope, and another to the legacy of alto saxophonist Julian "Cannonball" Adderley. He recorded one album in Los Angeles with Idris Muhammad and saxmen Paul Carr and Michael O'Neill, Mating Call, one album with Philadelphian Sam Reed, one double CD set in tribute to the bebop era, Aliens in a Bebop Planet, one album on a small big band format with the JM Horns, High Quote, and three albums with his trio from Kansas City (Enigmatix, Need to Bring Out Love and World Gardens). He recorded three albums in Miami, Roberto Magris Sextet Live in Miami @ The WDNA Jazz Gallery with a group including Brian Lynch, Sun Stone featuring Ira Sullivan and Match Point. He also recorded three albums in Chicago, Suite!, with a group including trumpeter Eric Jacobson and tenor saxophonist Mark Colby, Shuffling Ivories on duo with bassist Eric Hochberg, and Duo & Trio on duo with Mark Colby a.o.

In Europe, Magris has performed at festivals and jazz clubs with the MUH Trio (Roberto Magris/František Uhlíř/Jaromir Helešic Trio), which has its base in Prague and recorded the albums Prague After Dark in 2016 and A Step into Light in 2020 (both issued by JMood). In 2024, Magris reunited his Europlane group after twenty years and performed at festivals and recorded the album Freedom Is Peace (issued by JMood). In 2025, the Roberto Magris/Denis Razz Quartet, which includes Croatian jazz musicians, began performing, and in the same year recorded the album In Action (issued by JMood).

Magris has performed concerts on solo piano, recording the solo album Lovely Day(s) (issued by JMood) and for jazz piano, orchestra, and strings with the Big Band Ritmo Sinfonica from Verona and the Orchestra Giovanile del Veneto, recording the album Restless Spirits - Big Band Ritmo-Sinfonica Città di Verona plays the music of Roberto Magris (issued by Velut Luna).

Critic Edward Blanco at AllAboutJazz called Magris "one of the finest piano players on the planet".

Critic Scott Yanow at Los Angeles Jazz Scene wrote: "Magris is an inventive player who invigorates the jazz modern mainstream, and a fine arranger who has organized a variety of stimulating groups".

== Playing style ==
Jazz critic Ira Gitler wrote: "As a pianist, [Magris] reflects some of his most admired models – Wynton Kelly, Tommy Flanagan, Bill Evans, Kenny Drew, Jaki Byard, Randy Weston, McCoy Tyner, Andrew Hill, Paul Bley, Don Pullen and Steve Kuhn – (a varied group indeed) in his own way. There is a quick, supple right hand and the rich harmonies of the two-handed transition in his playing that don’t necessarily summon up instant comparisons to any of the above or others."

== Discography ==
- Life in Israel, with Larry Smith, Marco Castelli, Ofer Israeli, Luigi Rossi and Davide Ragazzoni (Jazzis, 1990)
- Music of Today, with Martin Klingeberg, Achim Goettert-Zadek, Marco Castelli, Joerg Drewing, Albrecht Riermeier, Rudi Engel and Davide Ragazzoni (Splasch, 1992)
- Maliblues (Map, 1994)
- Check-In, with Tony Lakatos, Michael Erian, Robert Balzar, Gabriele Centis and Fulvio Zafret (Soul Note, 2005)
- Il Bello del Jazz, with Herb Geller, Darko Jurkovic, Rudi Engel and Gabriele Centis (Soul Note, 2006)
- Current Views, with Philip Catherine, Bill Molenhof, Roberto Ottaviano, Vitold Rek a.o. (Soul Note, 2009)
- Kansas City Outbound with Art Davis and Jimmy „Junebug“ Jackson (JMood Records|JMood, 2008)
- Mating Call, with Paul Carr, Michael O'Neill, Elisa Pruett and Idris Muhammad (JMood, 2010)
- Canzoni Italiane in Jazz (Pop-Eye, 2011)
- Morgan Rewind: A Tribute to Lee Morgan Vol. 1, with Brandon Lee, Logan Richardson, Elisa Pruett and Albert "Tootie" Heath (JMood, 2012)
- One Night in with Hope and More Vol. 1, with Elisa Pruett and Albert "Tootie" Heath (JMood, 2012)
- Aliens in a Bebop Planet, with Matt Otto, Dominique Sanders, Brian Steever, Pablo Sanhueza and Eddie Charles (JMood, 2012)
- Ready for Reed - Sam Reed Meets Roberto Magris, with Sam Reed, Kendall Moore, Steve Lambert, Dominique Sanders, Brian Steever and Pablo Sanhueza (JMood, 2013)
- Cannonball Funk'n Friends, with Hermon Mehari, Jim Mair, Dominique Sanders and Alonzo Scooter Powell (JMood, 2013)
- One Night in with Hope and More Vol. 2, with Elisa Pruett, Brian Steever and Albert "Tootie" Heath (JMood, 2013)
- Morgan Rewind: A Tribute to Lee Morgan Vol. 2, with Hermon Mehari, Jim Mair, Peter Schlamb, Elisa Pruett, Brian Steever and Pablo Sanhueza (JMood, 2013)
- An Evening with Herb Geller & The Roberto Magris Trio – Live in Europe 2009, with Herb Geller a.o. (JMood, 2014)
- Enigmatix, with Dominique Sanders, Brian Steever, Pablo Sanhueza and Monique Danielle (JMood, 2015)
- Need to Bring Out Love, with Dominique Sanders, Brian Steever, Julia Haile and Monique Danielle (JMood, 2016)
- Live in Miami @ The WDNA Jazz Gallery - Roberto Magris Sextet with Brian Lynch, Jonathan Gomez, Chuck Bergeron, John Yarling and Murph Aucamp (JMood, 2017)
- World Gardens, with Dominique Sanders, Brian Steever and Pablo Sanhueza (JMood, 2018)
- Sun Stone, with Ira Sullivan, Mark Colby, Shareef Clayton, Jamie Ousley, Rodolfo Zuniga (JMood, 2019)
- Suite!, with Mark Colby, Eric Jacobson, Eric Hochberg, Greg Artry, PJ Aubree Collins (JMood, 2019)
- Live In Melbourne, with Ettore Martin, Rob Severini, Enzo Carpentieri (RSP, 2020)
- Shuffling Ivories, with Eric Hochberg (JMood, 2021)
- Match Point, with Alfredo Chacon, Dion Kerr, Rodolfo Zuniga (JMood, 2021)
- Duo & Trio, with Mark Colby a.o. (JMood, 2022)
- High Quote, with Matt Otto, Monique Danielle, Jim Mair a.o. (JMood, 2023)
- Love Is Passing Thru, with Ettore Martin, Danilo Gallo, Enzo Carpentieri (JMood, 2024)
- Freedom Is Peace, with Tony Lakatos, Florian Brambock, Lukas Oravec, Rudi Engel, Gasper Bertoncelj (JMood, 2024)
- Lovely day(s), solo piano (JMood, 2025)
- In Action, with Denis Razz, Karlo Ilic, Rajko Ergic (JMood, 2026)

=== with the MUH Trio (Magris/Uhlir/Helesic Trio) ===
- Prague After Dark, with František Uhlíř and Jaromir Helešic (JMood, 2017)
- A Step into Light, with František Uhlíř and Jaromir Helešic (JMood, 2020)

=== with the Gruppo Jazz Marca ===
- Comunicazione Sonora (IAF, 1982 - re-issued by Arision, 2005)
- Aria di Città (IAF, 1983 - re-issued by Arision, 2009)
- Mitteleuropa (Gulliver, 1986 - re-issued by Arision, 2006)

=== with the Europlane Orchestra ===
- Live at Zooest (Zooest, 1998)
- Plays Kurt Weill, with Ines Reiger (Pull, 2000)

=== with the Big Band Ritmo-Sinfonica Città di Verona ===
- Restless Spirits - Big Band Ritmo-Sinfonica Città di Verona plays the music of Roberto Magris (Velut Luna, 2009)

=== with the DMA Urban Jazz Funk ===
- DMA Urban Jazz Funk - Up to the Beat (Map, 2003)

=== with the Alfabeats Nu Jazz ===
- Stones (Oasis, 2006)

== As sideman ==
=== with Sal Nistico ===
- Recorda-me (JMood, 2026)

=== with Eddie "Lockjaw" Davis ===
- It Could Happen To Swing (JMood, 2026)
