= Live in Miami @ The WDNA Jazz Gallery =

Live album by Roberto Magris Sextet
- Released: 2017
- Recorded: February 6, 2016
- Venues: WDNA Jazz Gallery, Miami, Florida
- Genre: Jazz
- Length: 76:41
- Labels: JMood Records; JM-14
- Producer: Paul Collins

Roberto Magris chronology
Prague After Dark (2017)	Live in Miami @ The WDNA Jazz Gallery (2017)	World Gardens (2018)

Live in Miami @ The WDNA Jazz Gallery is an album by jazz pianist Roberto Magris recorded live in Miami at the WDNA radio station's Jazz Gallery, released on the JMood Records label in 2017, and featuring performances by the Roberto Magris Sextet, also including Brian Lynch.

== Reception ==
Professional ratings
Review scores
Source	Rating
DownBeat	4/5 stars
All About Jazz	4/5 stars
Concerto (Austria)	4.5/5 stars
Jazz Journal	4/5 stars
Sk.jazz	4/5 stars
Jazzport	8.5/10 stars
Chicago Jazz Magazine	
Rifftides	
JazzdaGama	
Salt Peanuts	
Jazzrytmit	
Jazz Hot	

The Down Beat review by Carlo Wolff awarded the album 4 stars and simply states: "While the mostly original material is comfortably within Magris’ revered bop tradition, the fire with which this group plays – goosed by the leader's keyboard pyrotechnics – puts the recording over the top." The Chicago Jazz Magazine review by Hrayr Attarian simply states: "This alluring and enjoyable album captures Magris and his colleagues in peak form. It also demonstrates Magris’ superlative skills as a composer and bandleader. Live in Miami @The WDNA Jazz Gallery is both memorable and accessible and will prove to have a wide appeal."

== Track listing ==
1. African Mood (Roberto Magris) - 11:39
2. What Blues? (Roberto Magris) - 8:33
3. Song for an African Child (Roberto Magris) - 9:59
4. April Morning (Rahsaan Roland Kirk) - 9:57
5. Chachanada (Roberto Magris) - 9:31
6. Il Bello del Jazz (Roberto Magris) - 9:50
7. A Flower Is a Lovesome Thing (Billy Strayhorn) - 5:46
8. Standard Life (Roberto Magris) - 9:16
9. Blues for My Sleeping Baby (Roberto Magris) - 2:05

== Personnel ==
=== Musicians ===
- Brian Lynch - trumpet
- Jonathan Gomez - tenor sax
- Roberto Magris - piano
- Chuck Bergeron - bass
- John Yarling - drums
- Murph Aucamp - congas and percussion

=== Production ===
- Paul Collins – executive producer and co-producer
- Edward Blanco – co-producer
- Stephen Malagodi – engineering
- Daria Lacy – design
- Stephen Malagodi and Nadja Debenjak – photography
