= Stones (Alfabeats Nu Jazz album) =

Studio album by Alfabeats Nu Jazz
- Released: 2006
- Recorded: 2005
- Studios: Urban Recordings Studio, Trieste, Italy
- Genres: Jazz; nu jazz; jazz-funk; progressive rock
- Length: 43:50
- Label: Oasis
- Producer: Roberto Magris

Roberto Magris chronology
Il Bello del Jazz (2006)	Stones (2006)	Kansas City Outbound (2008)

Stones is an album recorded in Italy by the group Alfabeats Nu Jazz. The album was released in the United States on the Oasis label in 2006 and distributed by JMood Records.

== Reception ==
Professional ratings
Review scores
Source	Rating
All About Jazz	4.5/5 stars

The All About Jazz review by John Kelman awarded the album 4½ stars and simply states: "Alfabeats is a playing band, albeit one with a language that extends far beyond the conventional definition of jazz to include elements of soul, R&B, funk... even hints of progressive rock and classic '70s Brit-rock. Regardless of how the group amalgamates a seemingly disparate group of influences, groove is priority number one. Stones is an exciting debut that will no doubt appeal to a younger demographic. But it's just as certain to attract more seasoned jazzers who don't have a knee-jerk reaction against rap or the idea of straying away from convention."

== Track listing ==
All tracks are written by Max "Mbassado" Marzio and Roberto Magris, except where noted.

1. "Syeeda's Flute in Wonderland" – 6:04
2. "Stones" – 6:27
3. "Islamic Spires" – 5:06
4. "Red Cap & the Bad Loop" – 6:30
5. "L.A.P.D." (Marzio, Paolo Andriolo, Luca Boscagin) – 2:53
6. "Terra Nuda" – 2:27
7. "Reaching the Holy Land" (Magris) – 4:55
8. "Get Coltranized" – 4:52
9. "Floppy Generation Blues" – 4:02

== Personnel ==
Alfabeats Nu Jazz

- Max "Mbassado" Marzio – vocals, rap
- Luca Boscagin – electric guitar
- Roberto Magris – piano, electric piano, Hammond organ
- Paolo Andriolo – electric bass
- Paolo Prizzon – drums and percussion

Production

- Roberto Magris – producer
- Paul Collins – executive producer
- Fulvio Zafret – engineering
