= Enigmatix =

Studio album by Roberto Magris
- Released: 2015
- Recorded: October 29, 2013
- Studios: Chapman Recording Studio; Lenexa, Kansas
- Genre: Jazz
- Length: 66:08
- Labels: JMood Records; JM-10
- Producer: Paul Collins

Roberto Magris chronology
An Evening with Herb Geller & The Roberto Magris Trio - Live in Europe 2009 (2014)	Enigmatix (2015)	Need to Bring out Love (2016)

Enigmatix is an album by jazz pianist Roberto Magris released on the JMood Records label in 2015, featuring performances by Magris with his trio from Kansas City.

== Reception ==
Professional ratings
Review scores
Source	Rating
DownBeat	3.5/5 stars
All About Jazz	4/5 stars
All About Jazz	4/5 stars
Jazz Journal	4/5 stars
JazzdaGama	
Orkester Journalen	
Jazz Podium	
Jazzrytmit	

The DownBeat review by Carlo Wolff awarded the album 3½ stars and simply states: "Italian pianist Roberto Magris goes modern and groovy on Enigmatix, his intriguing foray into complex funk and pop." The All About Jazz review by Jack Bowers awarded the album 4 stars and simply states: "In spite of the album's esoteric title, the music is resolutely transparent and accessible with no shortage of melody, harmony or rhythm. A spellbinding showcase for Roberto Magris whose notable artistry enables Enigmatix to stand out in a crowd." The All About Jazz review by Edward Blanco awarded the album 4 stars and simply states: "Pianist Roberto Magris takes on the challenge of modern jazz by producing a stellar new sound on the creative Enigmatix, featuring a tad more of his improvisational skills, compositional diversity and excellent musicianship in delivering another outstanding outing affirming his reputation as one of the finest piano men in the world."

== Track listing ==
1. Enigmatix - part 1 (Roberto Magris) - 12:55
2. Counterparts (Roberto Magris) - 5:47
3. No Sadness (Roberto Magris) - 6:33
4. J.F. No Key (Roberto Magris) - 14:25
5. Enigmatix - part 2 (Roberto Magris) - 10:15
6. My Cherie Amour (Stevie Wonder) - 8:01
7. Do It Again (Fagen/Becker) - 8:12

== Personnel ==
=== Musicians ===
- Roberto Magris - piano
- Dominique Sanders - bass
- Brian Steever - drums
- Pablo Sanhueza - congas and percussion
- Monique Danielle - vocal (on # 3)

=== Production ===
- Paul Collins – executive producer and producer
- George Hunt – engineering
- Stephen Bocioaca – design
- Jerry Lockett – photography
