= Ready for Reed - Sam Reed Meets Roberto Magris =

Ready for Reed – Sam Reed Meets Roberto Magris

Studio album by Sam Reed & Roberto Magris
- Released: 2013
- Recorded: November 1, 2011
- Studios: Chapman Recording Studio Lenexa, Kansas
- Genre: Jazz
- Length: 69:41
- Labels: JMood Records; JM-06
- Producer: Paul Collins

Roberto Magris chronology
Aliens in a Bebop Planet (2012)	Ready for Reed – Sam Reed Meets Roberto Magris (2013)	Cannonball Funk'n Friends (2013)

Ready For Reed – Sam Reed Meets Roberto Magris is an album by jazz saxophonist Sam Reed and pianist Roberto Magris released on the JMood Records label in 2013.

== Reception ==
Professional ratings
Review scores
Source	Rating
All About Jazz	4/5 stars
All About Jazz	4/5 stars
All About Jazz	4/5 stars
Orkester Journalen	4/5 stars
Concerto	4/5 stars
Jazzrytmit	

The All About Jazz review by C. Michael Bailey awarded the album 4 stars and simply states: "The union of the pair on Ready for Reed is not the standard "blowing session" of the 1950s, but instead a cogent and integrated paradigm of musical ideas expressed as such. This music does not have the hot New York City sound of period Jazz Messengers; it is more like the Philadelphia sound of Bobby Timmons and the Heath brothers, with whom Reed performed." The All About Jazz review by Jack Bowers awarded the album 4 stars and simply states: "Italian-born Pianist Roberto Magris, never one to let labels stand in the way of tasteful and invigorating music, skates from funk to fusion, blues to bop and even ballads on this prismatic album with guest alto Sam Reed, a longtime trouper on the Philadelphia scene who cut his musical teeth with the likes of trumpeter Ted Curson, pianist Bobby Timmons and the redoubtable Heath brothers (Albert, Percy and especially saxophonist Jimmy)." The All About Jazz review by Edward Blanco awarded the album 4 stars and simply states: "It certainly seems clear that Sam Reed was ready to meet and play with Roberto Magris and that the pianist, in turn, was obviously Ready for Reed and, as documented on this superb outing, these two master musician sure know how to make some beautiful music together."

== Track listing ==
1. Jungle Strut (Gene Ammons) – 5:47
2. The Swagger (Roberto Magris) – 7:05
3. Love You Madly (Duke Ellington) – 6:49
4. Paris Blues Revisited (Billy Strayhorn) – 7:44
5. Quasimodo (Charlie Parker) – 5:03
6. I Married an Angel (Rodgers/Hart) – 6:58
7. Ready for Reed (Roberto Magris) – 5:06
8. Sweet Jenny Lou (Carpenter/Mundy) – 4:59
9. Be My Love (Cahn/Brodszky) – 5:22
10. Stopstart (Lee Morgan) – 3:37
11. Audio Notebook – 10:45

== Personnel ==
=== Musicians ===
- Sam Reed – alto sax
- Kendall Moore – trombone
- Steve Lambert – tenor sax (on 6, 7)
- Roberto Magris – piano, Hammond organ
- Dominique Sanders – bass
- Brian Steever – drums
- Pablo Sanhueza – congas (on 1, 2, 7 e 8)

=== Production ===
- Paul Collins – executive producer and producer
- George Hunt – engineering
- Stephen Bocioaca – design
- Jerry Lockett and Nadja Debenjak – photography
