= Jim Mair (musician) =

Jazz musician/educator

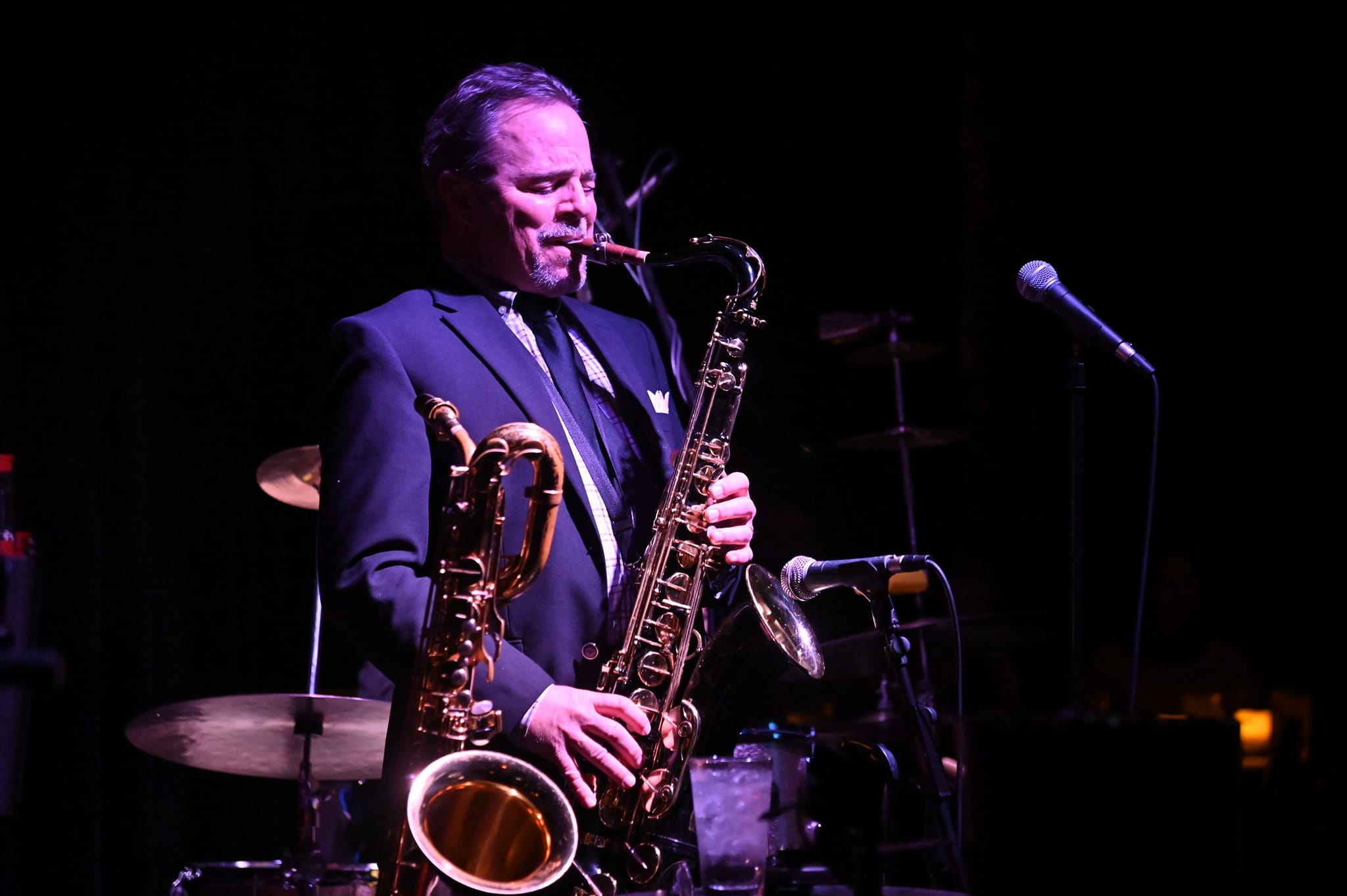

James Christopher Mair) is a soprano, alto, tenor, baritone saxophonist, flautist, piccoloist, percussionist, pianist, singer, band leader, teacher and entrepreneur.

== Biography ==
Mair was raised in Winnipeg, Manitoba, and graduated from Silver Heights Collegiate in 1984. That same year, his quintet won top high school combo in Canada and he was selected lead tenor in the Canadian High School All Star Jazz Ensemble. His school band directors were Wilfred Jones and Jim Mackay. In June 1986, he was profiled in DOWNBEAT magazine as a young musician deserving of wider recognition.

In 1988, Mair graduated from the University of Mary (U-Mary) in Bismarck, North Dakota, with a Bachelor of Science degree in Music Education. In 1990, he graduated from the Kansas City Conservatory of Music and Dance (UMKC) at the University of Missouri with a Master of Arts degree in music. He studied with Scott Prebys and Loran Eckroth at U-Mary from 1984 to 1988, with Mike Parkinson, Gary Foster and Tim Timmons at UMKC from 1988 to 1990, and did additional studies at the Banff Summer Jazz Workshop with Dave Holland, Kenny Wheeler and Pat LaBarbera in 1988. He is a two-time full fellowship recipient at the Aspen Music Festival in 1989 and 1990.

Mair was Professor of Music and Director of Instrumental and Jazz Studies at Kansas City Kansas Community College (KCKCC) from 1999 to 2023. In 2014, his college big band performed at the 30th annual Havana Jazz Festival in Cuba. He is the Founder and Artistic Director of the Kansas City Jazz Alliance, the Kansas City High School and Middle School Jazz All Stars program, and the Kansas City Jazz Summit, which includes the annual Basically Basie Competition. Jim is the Founder of the Kansas City Jazz Orchestra and also the original Artistic Director and Conductor leading the KCJO from 2003 to 2011. He is also a co-founder of the Prairie Village Jazz Festival.

Mair has served on the faculty at the College of Southern Idaho, the International Music Camp, and the Charlie Parker Academy of the Arts. In addition, he has served as a staff writer for the Saxophone Journal and since 1992 as an artist and clinician for the Selmer Company. Mair has conducted the North Dakota, South Dakota and Idaho All-State Jazz Ensembles (twice each) and the Kansas City All District Jazz Band (six times). While teaching in Idaho from 1995 to 1999, his radio show Table Down Front was broadcast across the northwest on NPR affiliates. His performance credits include appearances at the Havana Jazz Festival, the New York City JVC Jazz Festival, Montreux Jazz Festival, IAJE Convention, JEN Convention, Carnegie Recital Hall, Birdland, Showman’s Cafe in New York City and the Duchin Room in Sun Valley, Idaho.

In 1999, Mair was honored by the Governor of Idaho for his outstanding contributions to the arts. He received the same recognition from the state of Kansas in 2010. In the spring of 2013, Mair received the Henry Louis Teaching Excellence Award from KCKCC as faculty member of the year. In early 2014, he was awarded the League for Innovation John & Suanne Roueche Teaching Excellence Award. In 2015, he was awarded an honorary degree from the University of West London’s London College of Music for his contributions to jazz education, both in North America and the United Kingdom. Additional accolades include Alumnus of the Year at both of the universities he attended, the University of Mary in 1995 and the University of Missouri—Kansas City Conservatory of Music and Dance in 2017. Also in 2017, the Kansas City Jazz Alliance, formed by Mair and his wife Mary, received Jazz Distinction recognition in a concert celebration at the Johnny Pacheco Latin Music and Jazz Festival at Lehman College (SUNY) in the Bronx, New York. In 2021, the annual four-day Kansas City Jazz Summit was selected as Best of Kansas City for local businesses, and in 2022, the readers of JAM magazine voted for Mair as Kansas City's Favorite Saxophonist. Mair also serves on the advisory board for the Metheny Family Music Foundation and the Burnett Family Foundation.

Jim has on multiple occasions performed, as a soloist, The Star Spangled Banner and O Canada at NCAA college and professional sporting events, including for the Kansas City Chiefs, Kansas City Royals and Kansas City Monarchs home games.

Mair retired after 28 years of college teaching in July 2023, and in the 2023 to 2024 academic year, he served as an Artist in Residence at Fort Richmond Collegiate in his hometown of Winnipeg, Manitoba, directing the jazz bands and teaching three sections of beginning band. In the fall of 2024, Mair joined the music department at St. James Academy in Lenexa, Kansas, where he serves as director of Instrumental Jazz.

== Discography ==
=== As leader ===
- "8th & Central" with Carmell Jones (1991)
- "Hip Soul" (1995)
- Live on the Plaza (1995)
- Here's to the People (2003)
- Christmastime (2004)
- College of Southern Idaho "Live at Montreux" (1998)
- The Kansas City Jazz Orchestra "Take One" (2006)
- The Kansas City Jazz Orchestra "Live on the Plaza" (2008)

=== As sideman ===
- Lisa Henry: Straight No Chaser (1991)
- Tim Whitmer: Humorous Intentions (1992)
- Concepts Jazz: Chad's Dad (drum set) (1997)
- Tim Whitmer: Kansas City Standard Time (2002)
- Najee (2011)
- Roberto Magris: Cannonball Funk'n Friends (JMood Records, 2013)
- Roberto Magris: Morgan Rewind: A Tribute to Lee Morgan Vol. 2 (JMood Records, 2013)
- Roberto Magris: High Quote (JMood Records, 2023)

== Bibliography ==
- DOWNBEAT auditions section June 1986
- JAM magazine cover story December 1991
- SAXOPHONE JOURNAL reviewer of new recordings 1992-1999
- SAXOPHONE JOURNAL cover story January/February 1997
- SAXOPHONE JOURNAL cover story November/December 2000
- JAM magazine cover story April 2004
- Kansas City ART Magazine cover story May 2004
- SPACES - KANSAS CITY a profile of the Kansas City Jazz Orchestra February 2008

== Awards ==
- 1984 Winning High School Combo (leader/performer)- Gold Winner Canadian National Finals, Toronto, ON
- 1984 Lead Tenor Canadian High School All Star Jazz Ensemble
- 1985 Outstanding Collegiate Soloist, Elmhurst College Jazz Festival - Chicago, Illinois
- 1986 DownBeat Magazine Auditions section June edition - young talent deserving wider recognition
- 1987 Outstanding Collegiate Soloist, Elmhurst College Jazz Festival - Chicago, Illinois
- 1988 Outstanding Collegiate Soloist, Elmhurst College Jazz Festival - Chicago, Illinois
- 1989 Full Fellowship recipient Aspen Music Festival
- 1990 Full Fellowship recipient Aspen Music Festival
- 1991 Winner Best Saxophonist JAM magazine readers poll
- 1995 Alumnus of the Year, University of Mary, Bismarck, North Dakota
- 1998 Person of the Year, Twin Falls Idaho Chamber of Commerce
- 1999 Idaho Governor's Award for the Arts recognition
- 2002 Who's Who of American Teachers
- 2010 Kansas Governor's Award for the Arts recognition
- 2013 Faculty of the Year, Henry Louis Award for Teaching Excellence at Kansas City Kansas Community College
- 2014 Teaching Excellence Award, League for Innovation - John & Suanne Roueche Foundation
- 2015 Honorary Degree from the London College of Music, University of West London, England
- 2016 Alumnus of the Year, University of Missouri-Kansas City Conservatory of Music and Dance
- 2017 Jazz Distinction, The Kansas City Jazz Alliance, Johnny Pacheco Latin Jazz Festival, Lehman College, Bronx, New York
- 2021 Best of Kansas City - non-profit local business, Kansas City Jazz Summit
- 2022 Winner - Kansas City's Favorite Saxophonist, JAM magazine readers poll
- 2023 Outstanding Performance - DOWNBEAT Student Music Awards: Greater Kansas City Youth Jazz Orchestra, College Composer, College Jazz Soloist
- 2023 Winners - DOWNBEAT Student Music Awards: Top College Jazz Combo, Top College Fusion Ensemble, Top College Jazz Soloist, Top College Composer
- 2024 Outstanding Performance - DOWNBEAT Student Music Awards: Greater Kansas City Youth Latin Jazz Orchestra
- 2024 Winners - DOWNBEAT Student Music Awards: Top High School Honors Jazz Ensemble: Greater Kansas City Youth Jazz Orchestra
