= JMood Records =

- Founded: 2006
- Founder: Paul Collins
- Distributors: Bandcamp, Spotify, Apple Music, Amazon Music, Discogs, SoundCloud
- Genre: Jazz
- Country of origin: U.S.
- Location: Kansas City, Missouri, U.S.
- Official website: www.jmoodrecords.com

JMood Records is an independent record label founded in Kansas City by Paul Collins in 2006. In 2026, the label celebrated its 20th anniversary, receiving extensive coverage in the music press and simultaneously releasing five CDs to mark the occasion. Although JMood is best known for jazz music, the label has released a wide variety of recordings. JMood's motto is "… A Sound Choice… The intersection of art and audio!" The label's Music Director is the Italian jazz pianist Roberto Magris, and over the course of its twenty-year history, numerous leading jazz artists have participated in JMood's recording sessions, including Art Davis, Idris Muhammad, Herb Geller, Ira Sullivan, Sam Reed, Albert Tootie Heath, Brian Lynch, Jim Mair, Roberto Magris, Tony Lakatos, Logan Richardson, Mark Colby, Eric Hochberg, Hermon Mehari and others. The label's catalog also includes a “Historical Series,”, which features live recordings from Europe in the 1980s by prominent jazz musicians, including Sal Nistico, Eddie Lockjaw Davis, Kai Winding, Ray Bryant, Art Farmer, Barney Kessel, Joe Newman and others.

== Discography ==
000	Roberto Magris Trio	Kansas City Outbound	with Roberto Magris, Art Davis, Jimmy "Junebug" Jackson and Zack Albetta	2008
001	Roberto Magris Quintet	Mating Call	with Paul Carr, Michael O'Neill, Roberto Magris, Elisa Pruett and Idris Muhammad	2010
002	Roberto Magris Quintet	Morgan Rewind: A Tribute to Lee Morgan Vol. 1	with Brandon Lee, Logan Richardson, Roberto Magris, Elisa Pruett and Albert "Tootie" Heath	2011
003	Roberto Magris Trio	One Night in with Hope and More Vol. 1	with Roberto Magris, Elisa Pruett and Albert "Tootie" Heath	2012
004	Roberto Magris Space Trek	Aliens in a Bebop Planet	with Matt Otto, Roberto Magris, Dominique Sanders, Brian Steever, Pablo Sanhueza and Eddie Charles	2012
005	Roberto Magris Quintet	Cannonball Funk'n Friends	with Hermon Mehari, Jim Mair, Roberto Magris, Dominique Sanders and Alonzo "Scooter" Powell	2013
006	Sam Reed, Roberto Magris	Ready for Reed - Sam Reed Meets Roberto Magris	with Sam Reed, Roberto Magris, Kendall Moore, Dominique Sanders, Brian Steever and Pablo Sanhueza	2013
007	Roberto Magris Septet	Morgan Rewind: A Tribute to Lee Morgan Vol. 2	with Hermon Mehari, Jim Mair, Peter Schlamb, Roberto Magris, Elisa Pruett and Brian Steever and Pablo Sanhueza	2014
008	Roberto Magris Trio	One Night in with Hope and More Vol. 2	with Roberto Magris, Elisa Pruett, Brian Steever and Albert "Tootie" Heath	2013
009	Roberto Magris	High Quote	with Josh Williams, Jim Mair, Matt Otto, Aryana Nemati, Jason Goudeau, Roberto Magris, Elisa Pruett, Brian Steever, Pablo Sanhueza and Monique Danielle	2023
010	Roberto Magris	Enigmatix	with Roberto Magris, Dominique Sanders, Brian Steever, Pablo Sanhueza and Monique Danielle	2015
011	Roberto Magris	Wind Summit	with Steven Lambert, Robert Scott Fromm, Roberto Magris, Dominique Sanders, Brian Steever and Julia Haile	2026
012	Herb Geller, Roberto Magris	An Evening with Herb Geller & The Roberto Magris Trio – Live in Europe 2009	with Herb Geller, Roberto Magris, Nikola Matosic and Enzo Carpentieri	2014
013	Roberto Magris	Need to Bring out Love	with Roberto Magris, Dominique Sanders, Brian Steever, Pablo Sanhueza, Julia Haile and Monique Danielle	2016
014	Roberto Magris Sextet	Live in Miami @ The WDNA Jazz Gallery	with Brian Lynch, Jonathan Gomez, Roberto Magris, Chuck Bergeron, John Yarling and Murph Aucamp	2017
015	MUH Trio	Prague After Dark	with Roberto Magris, František Uhlíř and Jaromir Helešic	2017
016	Roberto Magris	World Gardens	with Roberto Magris, Dominique Sanders, Brian Steever and Pablo Sanhueza	2018
017	Roberto Magris Sextet feat. Ira Sullivan	Sun Stone	with Ira Sullivan, Shareef Clayton, Mark Colby, Roberto Magris, Jamie Ousley and Rodolfo Zuniga	2019
018	Roberto Magris	Suite!	with Eric Jacobson, Mark Colby, Roberto Magris, Eric Hochberg, Greg Artry and PJ Aubree Collins	2019
019	Roberto Magris	Match Point	with Alfredo Chacon, Roberto Magris, Dion Kerr, Rodolfo Zuniga	2021
020	MUH Trio	A Step Into Light	with Roberto Magris, František Uhlíř and Jaromir Helešic	2020
021	Roberto Magris & Eric Hochberg	Shuffling Ivories	with Roberto Magris and Eric Hochberg	2021
022	Roberto Magris featuring Mark Colby	Duo & Trio	with Mark Colby, Roberto Magris, Elisa Pruett, Brian Steever, Pablo Sanhueza	2022
023	Roberto Magris	Love Is Passing Thru	with Roberto Magris, Ettore Martin, Danilo Gallo and Enzo Carpentieri	2024
025	Roberto Magris	Lovely day(s)	solo piano	2025
026	Roberto Magris Europlane For Jazz	Freedom Is Peace	with Tony Lakatos, Florian Brambock, Lukas Oravec, Roberto Magris, Rudi Engel, Gašper Bertoncelj	2024
028	Roberto Magris / Denis Razz Quartet	In Action	with Denis Razz, Roberto Magris, Karlo Ilič, Rajko Ergič	2026
029	Roberto Magris	Live In Hollywood	with Tony Lakatos, Roberto Magris, Art Davis, Alonzo “Scooter” Powell	2026
030	Herb Geller / Roberto Magris	Come Lately	with Herb Geller, Roberto Magris, Nikola Matošič and Enzo Carpentieri	2026
031	Roberto Magris Europlane Quintet	Broken Barriers	with Tony Lakatos, Florian Brambock, Roberto Magris, Nikola Matošič and Drago Gajo	2026
032	Sal Nistico	Recorda-me	with Sal Nistico, Fulvio Sisti, Roberto Magris, Max Sornig and Gabriele Centis	2026
033	Eddie "Lockjaw" Davis	It Could Happen To Swing	with Eddie “Lockjaw” Davis, Roberto Magris, Mauro Periotto and Gabriele Centis	2026
040	Roberto Magris Trio	Live In Mexico City	with Roberto Magris, Roberto Aymes, Luis Martinez	2026
