= Comunicazione Sonora =

Studio album by Gruppo Jazz Marca
- Released: 1982 – reissued in 2005
- Recorded: May 9, 1981
- Studios: Harmony Studio, Treviso, Italy
- Genre: Jazz
- Length: 29:22
- Labels: IAF (LP J6001 - 1982) and Arision (CD ARI018 2005)
- Producer: Gianni Efrikian

Roberto Magris chronology
Comunicazione Sonora (1982)	Aria di Città (1983)

Comunicazione Sonora is an album by the Gruppo Jazz Marca (Roberto Magris / Franco Testa / Franco Polisseni Trio) released in 1982 on the IAF (International Audio Film) label and reissued in 2005 by the English label Arision.

== Reception ==
Professional ratings
Review scores
Source	Rating
Jazzwise	3/5 stars

The Jazzwise review by Stuart Nicholson awarded the album 3 stars and simply states: "The album represents the debut of the then 22 year-old Italian pianist Roberto Magris in 1981 and is, by any standards, impressive."

== Track listing ==
1. Sguardo (Roberto Magris) - 5:20
2. Caccia Grossa (S. Magnoler) - 7:19
3. Comunicazione Sonora (F. Polisseni) - 2:17
4. Pierrot (Roberto Magris) - 5:30
5. Colori d’autunno (Roberto Magris) - 3:35
6. Messaggio (Roberto Magris) - 4:25

== Personnel ==
=== Musicians ===
- Roberto Magris - piano
- Franco Testa - electric bass
- Franco Polisseni - drums
