= Sam Reed (musician) =

- Born: October 18, 1935; Kingstree, South Carolina
- Died: July 7, 2021 (aged 85)
- Genre: Jazz
- Occupation: Musician
- Instrument: Saxophones

Sam Reed (October 18, 1935 – July 7, 2021) was a tenor saxophonist based in Philadelphia.

Working at the Uptown Theater in the late 1950s and early 1960s, he added jazz and rhythm & blues shows to what was at the time an R&B, blues and rock and roll venue. For some years, Reed was also musical director for Teddy Pendergrass, and in the early 1970s, he was the "horn contractor" for Gamble and Huff's Philadelphia International Records.

Bootsie Barnes, Mickey Roker and Jimmy Oliver are among the other Philadelphia-based musicians he has performed with.

In 2012, he received the Jazz Journalists Association's annual Jazz Heroes Award.

== Discography ==
=== As sideman ===
- 1958: "Get a Job" The Silhouettes
- 1969: Soul Summit - The Ambassadors
- 1970: When We Get Married - The Intruders
- 1970: Brand New Me - Dusty Springfield
- 1971: Gonna Take a Miracle - Laura Nyro and LaBelle
- 1971: Going East - Billy Paul
- 1981: It's Time for Love - Teddy Pendergrass
- 2013: Ready for Reed - Sam Reed Meets Roberto Magris (JMood Records, 2013)
