= Mating Call (Roberto Magris album) =

Studio album by Roberto Magris Quintet
- Released: 2010
- Recorded: December 6, 2008
- Studio: Mad Dog Studios Burbank, California
- Genre: Jazz
- Length: 64:51
- Labels: JMood Records; JM-01
- Producer: Paul Collins

Roberto Magris chronology
| Kansas City Outbound (2008) | Mating Call (2010) | Morgan Rewind: A Tribute to Lee Morgan Vol. 1 (2011) |

Mating Call is an album by jazz pianist Roberto Magris recorded in Los Angeles, released on the JMood Records label in 2010, and featuring performances by the Roberto Magris Quintet with Paul Carr, Michael O’Neill, Elisa Pruett and Idris Muhammad. The track list also includes a new version of Mating Call, the composition by Tadd Dameron from his album with John Coltrane.

== Reception ==
Professional ratings
Review scores
| Source | Rating |
|---|---|
| All About Jazz | 4.5/5 stars |
| All About Jazz | 4/5 stars |
| All About Jazz | 4/5 stars |
| All About Jazz | 4/5 stars |
| Orkester Journalen | 4/5 stars |
| Concerto | 4/5 stars |

The All About Jazz review by Edward Blanco awarded the album 4½ stars and simply states: "The music here is not typical or ordinary; it is creative, quite entertaining and superbly performed by all." The All About Jazz review by Jack Bowers awarded the album 4 stars and simply states: "Italian pianist Roberto Magris' quintet is world-class in every respect, consistently affirming its singular prowess on Mating Call. If musical excellence is more important to you than names, check out the Roberto Magris Quintet. Chances are you'll be pleasantly surprised."

== Track listing ==
1. "Optional Man" (Roberto Magris) - 10:18
2. "Hill of Illusions" (Roberto Magris) - 10:17
3. "Lament" (J.J. Johnson) - 8:38
4. "Theme for Ernie" (Fred Lacey) - 8:09
5. "Mating Call" (Tadd Dameron) - 13:32
6. "Europlane Blues" (Roberto Magris) - 5:58
7. "Lonely Town" (Leonard Bernstein) - 7:55

== Personnel ==
=== Musicians ===
- Paul Carr – tenor sax, soprano sax
- Michael O’Neill – tenor sax
- Roberto Magris - piano, electric piano
- Elisa Pruett - bass
- Idris Muhammad - drums

=== Production ===
- Paul Collins – executive producer and producer
- Samur Khouja and Eric Corne – engineering
- Amanda Reece – design
- Jerry Lockett – photography
