= Tony Lakatos =

Hungarian Jazz saxophonist (born 1958)

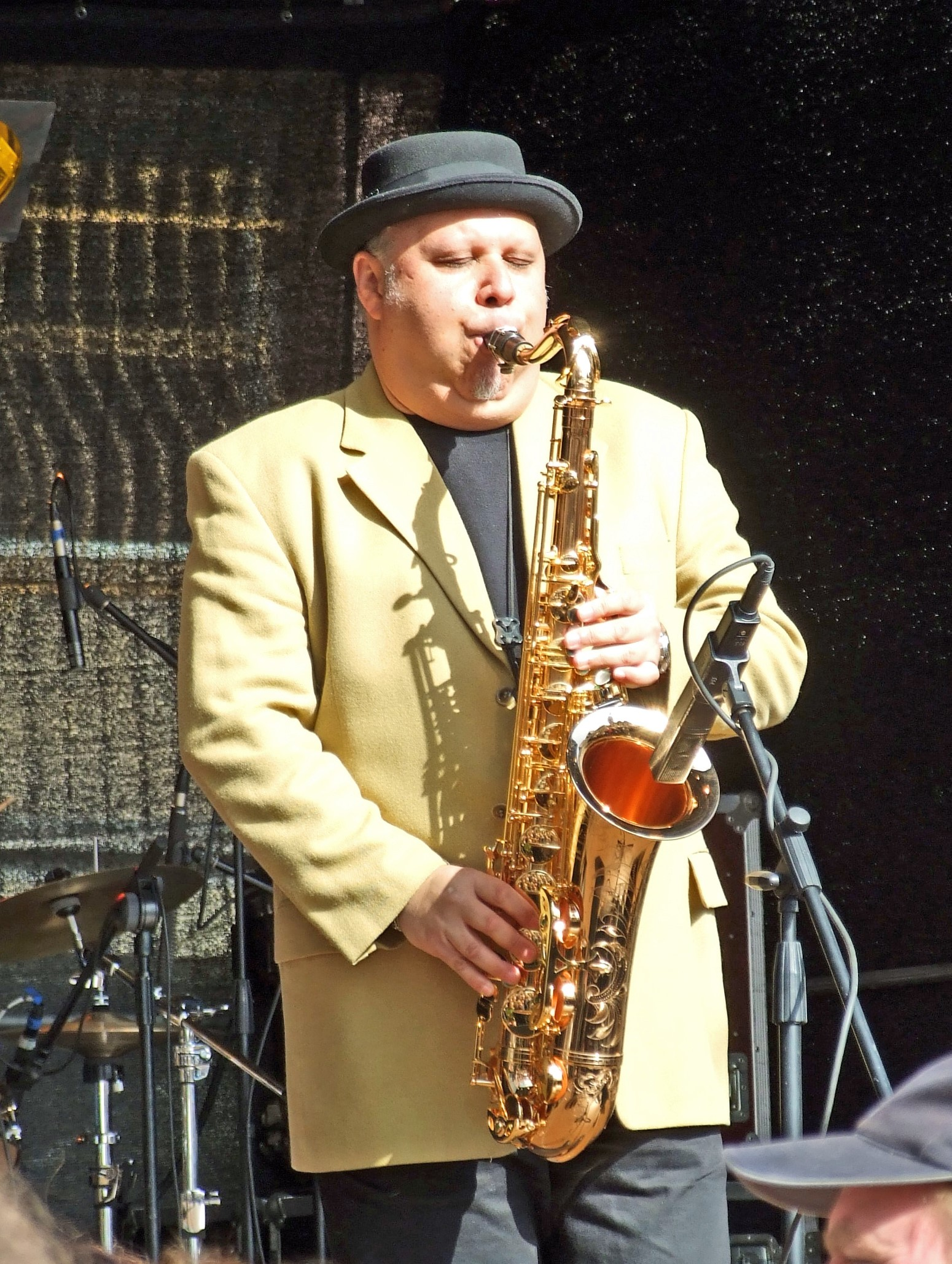
2008 in Frankfurt

Antal "Tony" Lakatos (born 13 November 1958 in Budapest) is a Hungarian Jazz saxophonist (tenor, soprano saxophone). He lives in Frankfurt (Germany).

Lakatos attended the Béla Bartók Conservatory in Budapest from 1975 to 1980, then moved to Germany, where he worked with Toto Blanke's band, Uwe Kropinski, Jasper van 't Hof, and Wolfgang Haffner. He has been leading his own ensembles since the late 1980s, including a group called Things; his sidemen have included JoAnne Brackeen, Terri Lynne Carrington, Al Foster, Billy Hart, and Anthony Jackson. He has also worked with Randy Brecker, Kevin Mahogany, George Mraz, the Mingus Big Band, Chris Hinze, Kirk Lightsey, Dusko Goykovich, Michael Sagmeister, Roberto Magris, Art Farmer, and Kenny Werner.

Lakatos was awarded the 2020 Hessian Jazz Prize.
