= The Penguin Guide to Jazz =

Encyclopedic dictionary of jazz recordings

- Eighth edition of the Penguin Guide to Jazz (2006), with cover photograph of Philly Joe Jones by Francis Wolff, Nola Rehearsal Studio, NYC, 1959
- Author: Richard Cook; Brian Morton
- Original title: The Penguin Guide to Jazz on CD, LP and Cassette
- Language: English
- Series: Penguin Guide
- Subject: Jazz
- Genre: Non-fiction; Encyclopedic; Reference
- Publisher: Penguin Books
- Publication date: 24 September 1992 (1st edition); 2010 (10th edition)
- Publication place: United Kingdom
- Media type: Paperback
- Pages: 1287–1534 (1st–8th ed.); 768 (2010)
- ISBN: 978-0-14-015364-4
- OCLC: 468362981

The Penguin Guide to Jazz is a reference work containing an encyclopedic directory of jazz recordings on CD which were (at the time of publication) currently available in Europe or the United States. The first nine editions were compiled by Richard Cook and Brian Morton, two chroniclers of jazz resident in the United Kingdom.

== History ==
The first edition was published in Britain by Penguin Books in 1992. Every subsequent two years, through 2010, a new edition was published with updated entries. The eighth and ninth editions, published in 2006 and 2008, respectively, each included 2,000 new CD listings.

The title took on different forms over the lifetime of the work, as audio technology changed. The seventh edition was known as The Penguin Guide to Jazz on CD while subsequent editions were titled The Penguin Guide to Jazz Recordings. The earliest edition had the title The Penguin Guide to Jazz on CD, LP and Cassette.

Richard Cook died in 2007, prior to the completion of the ninth edition (2008). Penguin released The Penguin Jazz Guide: The History of the Music in the 1001 Best Albums in December 2010, which contains fewer reviews and a different format from previous editions.

== Content ==
In the first nine editions, artists were listed alphabetically and the entries began with short (usually one paragraph) biographies before a comprehensive listing of a musicians' available recordings in the United Kingdom at that time. Each disc was given a rating of up to four stars and details of its label and catalogue number, musicians featured on the disc, month and year of the recording or the span of time in which the tracks were recorded and finally a review of varying length. Often a number of discs were reviewed together.

Two extra features, author's picks (crowns) and "core collections", were added to succeeding editions. The first showed entries flagged as personal favorites while the latter made special note of the "more essential" albums for a jazz CD collection. John Eyles comments in a review that "the implication is that the choices for crowns are subjective, while the Core Collection is somehow more objective", when in fact both lists are decided upon by the same two editors.

Bootlegs and limited-edition Mosaic Records releases were excluded. Some various-artists compilations were reviewed in the first edition but were dropped in later editions. Due to the increasing numbers of CDs on the market, space limitations and depth of coverage became an increasing problem: in the seventh edition, for instance, the index was dropped to save space, but it was restored in the eighth edition (though a number of entries were dropped or shortened to make room for it).

In the 10th edition, titled The Penguin Jazz Guide (2010), Morton revised his and Cook's entries from previous editions, and pared down the content to 1001 reviews of what Morton had selected as the best jazz recordings. Morton also presented the reviews in chronological order by recording dates, rather than alphabetically by artist, and included historical context for the recordings as well as biographical details. The 10th edition also dispensed with the starred rating system, the Core Collection, and Crown accolades.

== Reception ==
Though the first nine editions did not "spring any great surprises", the book "has a tried and trusted formula that works". It is also praised as being "of equal value to both experienced jazz listeners and novices". Alison Kerr, reviewing the 2010 Penguin Jazz Guide in The Herald, noted the lack of an index as a hindrance, but cited the chronological format as one of the book's strengths. Kerr also noted the subjective nature of Morton's selection of the best jazz albums.

== Editions ==
Edition	Title	Year	ISBN
1st	The Penguin Guide to Jazz on CD, LP and Cassette	1992	978-0-14-015364-4
2nd	The Penguin Guide to Jazz on CD, LP and Cassette	1994	978-0-670-85816-3
3rd	The Penguin Guide to Jazz on CD	1996	978-0-14-051368-4
4th	The Penguin Guide to Jazz on CD	1998	978-0-14-051383-7
5th	The Penguin Guide to Jazz on CD	2000	978-0-14-051452-0
6th	The Penguin Guide to Jazz on CD	2002	978-0-14-051521-3
7th	The Penguin Guide to Jazz on CD	2004	978-0-14-101416-6
8th	The Penguin Guide to Jazz Recordings	2006	978-0-14-102327-4
9th	The Penguin Guide to Jazz Recordings	2008	978-0-14-103401-0
10th	The Penguin Jazz Guide	2010	978-0-14-104831-4

== See also ==
- All Music Guide to Jazz
- The Rolling Stone Jazz Record Guide
