= Brian Morton (Scottish writer) =

Scottish writer (born 1954)

- Born: 1954 (age 71–72); Paisley, Scotland
- Education: University of Edinburgh
- Occupations: Writer, journalist, broadcaster
- Known for: Co-author, with Richard Cook, of The Penguin Guide to Jazz Recordings
- Spouse: Sarah Morton
- Children: 3

Brian Morton (born 1954) is a Scottish writer, journalist, and former broadcaster, specialising in jazz and modern literature.

== Early life and education ==
Morton worn in Paisley, near Glasgow, and raised in Dunoon. He was educated at the University of Edinburgh. In the late 1970s, he taught at the University of East Anglia, under his boss and mentor Malcolm Bradbury. He also taught at the University of Tromsø in Norway.

== Writing and broadcasting ==
From 1992 to 1997, Morton was the main presenter of Impressions for BBC Radio 3, a fortnightly jazz and improvised music programme. For more than a decade Morton was a familiar voice on music programmes and features on other arts related subjects on the London-based BBC networks. For some years, he was one of the presenters and a producer of The Usual Suspects, Later, he hosted The Brian Morton Show on BBC Radio Scotland, until 2003 after criticising the BBC's arts coverage.

He is co-author, with Richard Cook, of The Penguin Guide to Jazz Recordings (formerly ...on CD), whose ninth edition (undertaken single-handed following Cook's premature death in 2007) was published at the end of October 2008. He is also the author of The Blackwell Guide to Recorded Contemporary Music (1996), which covers modern classical music. Morton was a frequent contributor to Jazz Review magazine, and was briefly editor in 2008; the magazine was absorbed by Jazz Journal in 2009, for which Morton has written. A biography, Miles Davis, was issued by Haus Publishing in 2005. He is a long-standing contributor to The Wire and to the Catholic weekly The Tablet. Morton converted to Catholicism in 1984.

Morton's non-jazz books include translations from the Norwegian of Jonas Lie, Prince: Thief in the Temple (Canongate Books) and Shostakovich (Haus). A short biography of the writer Edgar Allan Poe appeared in November 2009.

Morton has been a 'Comment' columnist in the Scottish edition of The Observer newspaper and, like his American namesake, is an occasional contributor to The Nation magazine.

== Private life and honours ==
In 2011, Morton relocated to Kintyre, moving with his family into a small former monastery. He now writes and farms with his wife, landscape photographer Sarah Morton. They have one son. Morton also has two older daughters from a previous relationship. He is writing a biographical study of St Columba.

He holds an honorary D.Litt. from the University of St Andrews, awarded on St Andrews Day, 2000, for services to Scottish broadcasting and cultural life.
