= Marc Myers =

American journalist and author (born 1956)

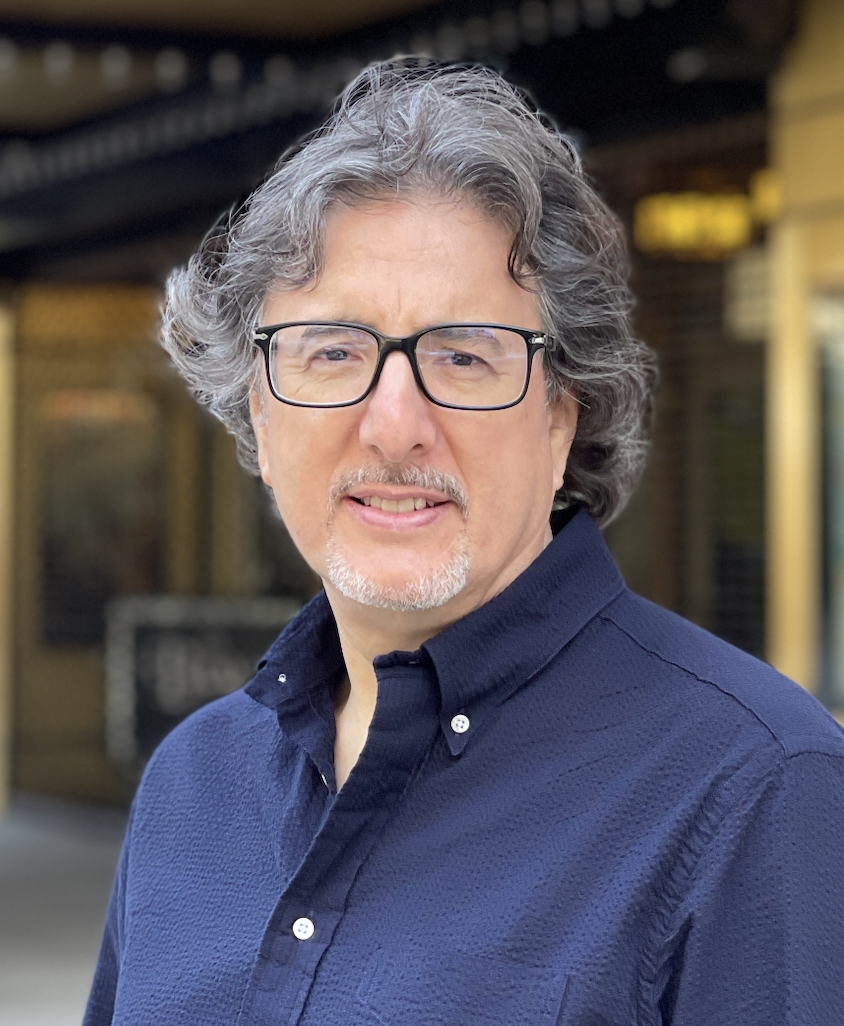
- Myers in 2021
- Born: September 4, 1956 (age 69); New York City, U.S.
- Occupations: Journalist; author; historian
- Known for: Wall Street Journal music and arts contributor, founder of JazzWax blog
- Website: www.jazzwax.com

Marc Myers (born September 4, 1956) is an American journalist, author of five books and a regular contributor to The Wall Street Journal, where he writes on music, the arts and celebrities. In 2007, he founded JazzWax, a leading daily jazz blog that has won three Jazz Journalists Association "Blog of the Year" awards.

== Early life ==
Myers was born in Manhattan and grew up in New York City and Cortlandt Manor, New York. He studied journalism at Northeastern University (undergraduate) and U.S. history at Columbia University (graduate).

== Career ==
=== New York Times ===
Myers began his writing career at The New York Times in the late 1970s as a college intern, joining the newspaper full-time in 1980 in the sports department. In 1985, he left to become an associate editor at Adweek, where he wrote about advertising and marketing, helping to launch Brandweek. For a time, he was business editor at Working Woman magazine, where his responsibilities included editing cover business and celebrity profiles, and he was editor of Bottom Line/Personal in the 1990s. In February 1999, his essay on President Bill Clinton's luck was published by The New York Times Op-Ed page.

=== Wall Street Journal ===
Since June 2010, Myers has written for The Wall Street Journal as a contributor on music and the arts, specifically rock, soul and jazz. He has interviewed more than 1,000 leading artists, musicians and celebrities for the paper. He writes the weekly "House Call" column for the Mansion section and a monthly column for the Arts section on albums that changed music history. He has also written for the Weekend Review and Off Duty sections of the paper.

=== JazzWax ===
Since JazzWax's launch in August 2007, Myers has posted six days a week and has conducted more than 300 multi-part interviews with jazz legends. He also posts commentary on historic and contemporary jazz, rock and pop recordings, winning three Jazz Journalists Association awards. In late 2025, the Jazzwax website was moved to Substack and most articles are now behind a subscription PaywallAbout - JazzWax.

== Personal life ==
His mother, Bernice Myers, was a children's book artist and illustrator who died in 2021. His father was Lou Myers, a commercial illustrator, cartoonist and writer who died in 2005. He is married to Alyse Myers, author of Who Do You Think You Are? A Memoir (Simon & Schuster).

== Liner notes ==
Myers has written liner notes for the following albums:

- Bill Evans: You Must Believe in Spring (Craft)
- Bill Evans: Inner Spirit (Resonance)
- Bill Evans: Morning Glory (Resonance)
- Bill Evans: Evans in England (Resonance)
- Bill Evans: Another Time - The Hilversum Concert (Resonance)
- Harry Allen: The Candy Men (Arbors)
- Bill Evans: Some Other Time: The Lost Session from the Black Forest (Resonance)
- Getz/Gilberto 50th Anniversary (UMe/Verve)
- Joe Alterman: Georgia Sunset (CD Baby)
- Miles Davis: The Original Mono Recordings (Sony/Legacy)
- Wes Montgomery: Movin': The Complete Verve Recordings (UMe/Verve)
- Ella Fitzgerald in Japan (UMG/Verve)
- Johnny Mandel: The Man and His Music (Arbors)
- Dinah Washington: The Fabulous Miss D! (UMG/Verve)
- Ayako Shirasaki: Falling Leaves (Jan Matthies)
- Sonny Rollins: Way Out West (Concord)
- Joe Alterman: Piano Tracks (Vol. 1)
- Carol Sloane: We'll Meet Again (Arbors)
- Brooks Tegler: Small Groups
- The Best of Benny Golson (Concord)
- Grant Stewart: Young at Heart (Sharp Nine)

== Books ==
- Anatomy of 55 More Songs: The Oral History of Top Hits That Changed Rock, Pop and Soul (2022), Grove Press, ISBN 978-0-8021-6020-1
- Rock Concert: An Oral History as Told by the Artists, Backstage Insiders, and Fans Who Were There (2021), Grove Press, ISBN 978-0-8021-5791-1
- Anatomy of a Song: The Oral History of 45 Iconic Hits That Changed Rock, R&B and Pop (2016), Grove Press, ISBN 080212559X
- Why Jazz Happened (2013), University of California Press, ISBN 0520268784
- How to Make Luck: 7 Secrets Lucky People Use to Succeed (1999), Renaissance Books, ISBN 978-1-58063-058-0
