= Jeff Hirshfield =

American jazz drummer (born 1955)

Jeffrey Lee Hirshfield (born August 22, 1955) is an American jazz drummer.

Hirshfield was born in New York City. He studied under Ed Soph. He worked for the Joffrey Ballet in 1976–1977 and then played with Mose Allison (1977–1979). During the 1980s he worked with Red Rodney and Ira Sullivan (1981–1985), Toshiko Akiyoshi (1986–1989), and Bennie Wallace (1987–1990). Alongside Fred Hersch and Steve LaSpina, he was a member of the trio Etc. during 1988–1991. During this time he also played in a trio with Hersch and Michael Formanek. From 1990 he played with Harold Danko, played in Formanek's Wide Open Spaces project, and played again with LaSpina in a quartet setting. He also worked in a quartet with John Abercrombie and Andy LaVerne early in the 1990s. In the mid-1990s he played in a trio with Marc Copland and Dieter Ilg (1992–1995), another trio with Tim Berne and Formanek (1993–1994), and the Lan Xang ensemble with David Binney, Donny McCaslin, and Scott Colley (after 1995).

Hirshfield has also played with a number of other leaders, including Bob Belden, Marc Copland, Vic Juris, Steve Slagle, Dave Stryker, Jim Snidero, Warren Bernhardt, Jay Anderson, and Paul Bley.

== Discography ==
=== As leader or co-leader ===
With Marc Cohen, Gary Peacock, John Abercrombie

- My Foolish Heart (Jazz City, 1988)

With ETC

- ETC (Red Record, 1990)
- ETC Plus One (Red Record, 1993)

With Roland Heinz & Adam Holzman

- H3 (Naxos, 2012)

=== As sideman ===
With Jamie Baum

- Undercurrents (Konnex, 1992)
- Sight Unheard (GM, 1996)
- Moving Forward, Standing Still (Omnitone, 2004)
- Solace (Sunnyside, 2008)
- In This Life (Sunnyside, 2013)
- Bridges (Sunnyside, 2018)

With Bob Belden

- Straight to My Heart (Blue Note, 1991)
- Puccini's Turandot (Blue Note, 1993)
- La Cigale (Sunnyside, 1998)

With David Binney

- The Luxury of Guessing (AudioQuest, 1995)
- Free to Dream (Mythology, 1998)
- A Small Madness (Auand, 2003)

With Michael Cochrane

- Quartet Music (SteepleChase, 2002)
- Pathways (SteepleChase, 2003)
- Right Now (SteepleChase, 2007)

With Harold Danko

- Next Age (SteepleChase, 1994)
- New Autumn (SteepleChase, 1996)
- The Feeling of Jazz (SteepleChase, 1996)
- Stable Mates (SteepleChase, 1998)
- Fantasy Exit (SteepleChase, 2002)
- Trilix (SteepleChase, 2004)
- Hinesight (SteepleChase, 2005)
- Oatts & Perry (SteepleChase, 2006)
- Times Remembered (SteepleChase, 2007)
- Escapades (SteepleChase, 2009)
- Oatts & Perry II (SteepleChase, 2010)
- Unriched (SteepleChase, 2012)
- Lost in the Breeze (SteepleChase, 2016)
- Triple Play (SteepleChase, 2017)

With Michael Formanek

- Wide Open Spaces (Enja, 1990)
- Extended Animation (Enja, 1992)
- Loose Cannon (Soul Note, 1993)

With Fred Hersch

- The French Collection (EMI, 1989)
- Heartsongs (Sunnyside, 1990)
- Evanessence (Evidence, 1991)
- Red Square Blue (Angel, 1993)

With Vic Juris

- For the Music (Jazzpoint, 1992)
- Night Tripper (SteepleChase, 1995)
- Music of Alec Wilder (Double-Time, 1996)
- Moonscape (SteepleChase, 1997)
- Remembering Eric Dolphy (SteepleChase, 1999)
- Songbook (SteepleChase, 2000)
- Songbook 2 (SteepleChase, 2002)

With Rich Perry

- Hearsay (SteepleChase, 2002)
- East of the Sun and West of 2nd Avenue (SteepleChase, 2004)
- You're My Everything (SteepleChase, 2005)
- At the Kitano 2 (SteepleChase, 2008)
- Gone (SteepleChase, 2009)
- Time Was (SteepleChase, 2012)
- Nocturne (SteepleChase, 2014)
- Organique (SteepleChase, 2015)
- Mood (SteepleChase, 2016)

With Steve LaSpina

- New Horizon (SteepleChase, 1992)
- Eclipse (SteepleChase, 1994)
- When I'm Alone (SteepleChase, 1995)
- Story Time (SteepleChase, 1996)
- When Children Smile (SteepleChase, 1997)
- Distant Dream (SteepleChase, 1998)
- The Bounce (SteepleChase, 2000)
- Remember When (SteepleChase, 2003)
- Play Room (SteepleChase, 2006)
- Moments (SteepleChase, 2008)

With Steve Slagle

- The Steve Slagle Quartet (SteepleChase, 1993)
- Reincarnation (SteepleChase, 1995)
- Spread the Word (SteepleChase, 1995)

With Loren Stillman

- How Sweet It Is (Nagel Heyer, 2003)
- Gin Bon (Fresh Sound, 2004)
- It Could Be Anything (Fresh Sound, 2005)
- The Brothers' Breakfast (SteepleChase, 2006)
- Trio Alto Vol. One (SteepleChase, 2006)

With Dave Stryker

- Blue Degrees (SteepleChase, 1993)
- Full Moon (SteepleChase, 1994)
- Nomad (SteepleChase, 1995)

With others

- John Abercrombie & Andy LaVerne, Now It Can Be Played (SteepleChase, 1993)
- Toshiko Akiyoshi, Wishing Peace from Liberty Suite (Ascent, 1986)
- Jay Anderson, Next Exit (DMP, 1992)
- Jay Anderson, Local Color (DMP, 1994)
- Warren Bernhardt, Reflections (ESA, 1991)
- Theo Bleckmann, Looking-Glass River (Traumton, 1995)
- Paul Bley, Notes on Ornette (SteepleChase, 1998)
- Gordon Brisker, The Gift (Naxos, 1997)
- Ted Brown, Preservation (SteepleChase, 2003)
- Joey Calderazzo, The Traveler (Blue Note, 1993)
- Scott Colley, Portable Universe (Free Lance, 1996)
- Frank Kimbrough, Rumors (Palmetto, 2010)
- Frank Kimbrough, Solstice (Pirouet, 2016)
- Eero Koivistoinen, Sometime Ago (A Records, 1999)
- Joe Fonda, What We're Hearing (W.E.R.F., 1996)
- Joe Fonda, Step-in (W.E.R.F., 2000)
- Jerry Hahn, Time Changes (Enja, 1995)
- Jerome Harris, In Passing (Muse, 1990)
- Ken Hatfield, The Surrealist Table (Arthur Circle Music, 2003)
- Ken Hatfield, For Langston (Arthur Circle Music, 2012)
- Charlie Mariano, Savannah Samurai (Jazzline, 1998)
- Pat Martino, All Sides Now (Blue Note, 1997)
- Bill Mays, Kaleidoscope (Jazz Alliance, 1992)
- Ron McClure, Sunburst (SteepleChase, 1992)
- Red Rodney & Ira Sullivan, Sprint (Elektra Musician, 1983)
- Rob Schneiderman, Radio Waves (Reservoir, 1991)
- Daniel Schnyder, (Mythology, (Enja, 1991)
- Alexander Sipiagin, Images (TCB, 1998)
- Judi Silvano, Dancing Voices (JSL, 1992)
- Louis Smith, Louisville (SteepleChase, 2004)
- Jim Snidero, Storm Rising (Ken Music, 1990)
- Jim Snidero, Urban Tales (Square Discs, 1993)
- Bennie Wallace, Bordertown (Blue Note, 1988)
- Bennie Wallace, Brilliant Corners (Denon, 1988)
- Walt Weiskopf, Exact Science (Iris, 1989)
- Walt Weiskopf, Mindwalking (Iris, 1990)
- Glenn Wilson, Blue Porpoise Avenue (Sunnyside, 1997)
- Jack Wilkins, Trioart (Arabesque, 1998)
