= Larry Gray =

American musician

- Born: Lawrence Waterman Gray; Blue Island, Illinois, U.S.
- Genres: Jazz, classical
- Occupation: Musician
- Instruments: Double bass, cello
- Website: www.larrygraymusic.com

Larry Gray is a Chicago musician known for his compositions and skill on the double bass and cello. His primary teachers were Joseph Guastafeste, longtime principal bassist of the Chicago Symphony Orchestra, and cellist Karl Fruh.

== Family ==
Gray was born to Pauline Waterman and Lawrence Gray. He has been married to Karolyn R. Kuehner since 1990. They have one daughter, Soffia H. Kuehner Gray.

== Music style ==
Originally a jazz guitarist, Gray switched to double bass and developed a reputation as a first-call sideman. Within a short time, he began to work at the Jazz Showcase in Chicago, where he appeared with drummer Wilbur Campbell and pianist Willie Pickens.

Throughout the years he has worked with George Coleman, Lee Konitz, Bobby Hutcherson, McCoy Tyner, Sonny Fortune, Ira Sullivan, Junior Mance, David "Fathead" Newman, Charles McPherson, Branford Marsalis, Benny Golson, Jackie McLean, Sonny Stitt, Eddie "Lockjaw" Davis, Al Cohn, Eddie Harris and Les McCann. In addition, he has collaborated with guitarists Kenny Burrell, Joe Pass, and Tal Farlow, as well as the drummers Ed Thigpen and Jack DeJohnette, and trumpeters Donald Byrd and Harry "Sweets" Edison, among others.

Gray has studied classical music extensively. His principal teachers were Joseph Guastafeste, longtime principal bassist of the Chicago Symphony Orchestra and cellist Karl Fruh. He received bachelor's and master's degrees in Cello Performance from Chicago Musical College.

== Touring ==
He tours extensively, performing at jazz festivals and clubs, including the Umbria Jazz Festival, the Montreal International Jazz Festival, The Montreaux Detroit Festival, the ECM Festival, the Poznan Jazz Festival, the Chicago Jazz Festival, Monterey Jazz Festival, the Havana Jazz Festival, Rio São Paulo Festival, North Sea Jazz Festival, Montreux Jazz Festival, Johannesburg International Jazz Festival, Carnegie Hall, Lincoln Center, the Hollywood Bowl, Village Vanguard, the Blue Notes in Tokyo, Nagoya, New York and Milan, Ronnie Scott's in London, Zawinal's Birdland in Vienna, and the Ravinia Festival, with such jazz luminaries as Marian McPartland, Clark Terry, Nancy Wilson, Frank Morgan, Roscoe Mitchell, James Moody, Larry Coryell, Louis Bellson, Barry Harris, Ramsey Lewis, Dorothy Donegan, Monty Alexander, Frank Wess, Joe Williams, Doc Severinsen and The Tonight Show Band, and Kenny Drew Jr.

== Recording and performing ==
Gray is an arranger and composer whose discography includes Solo + Quartet on Premonition Records; Gravity, a solo bass recording, and One Look, featuring his piano trio's performances of original compositions, both on Graywater Records; the Ramsey Lewis Trio recordings Appassionata, Time Flies, and With One Voice; the Ramsey Lewis and Nancy Wilson collaborations Meant to Be and Simple Pleasures, all on Narada/Virgin Records. He arranged and produced the album Django by Ferro by Mike Ferro.

His original composition for double bass and guitar, Five Movements, was commissioned and performed by the Chicago Symphony Orchestra Chamber Ensemble at Symphony Center in Chicago. His album Larry Gray 1,2,3 ..., featuring his guitar trio's performances of his original compositions, on Chicago Sessions Records, was released in December 2008.

He has recorded with Curtis Fuller, Ira Sullivan, Lin Halliday, Jodie Christian, Willie Pickens, Nicholas Payton, Randy Brecker, Bunky Green, Bob Moses, Laurence Nugent, John Williams and Bohola, Linda Eder, Dennis DeYoung, Jim Peterik, Peter Cetera, and Michael Smith.

He appeared on the PBS series Legends of Jazz hosted by Ramsey Lewis. He is a first-call studio musician and his playing can be heard on many commercial radio and television jingle and studio projects.

Gray has been featured as a solo recitalist on both bass and cello at various universities and venues throughout the midwest. His recitals combine jazz, classical, and improvised music.

He was the featured bassist in Amistad, produced by the Lyric Opera of Chicago. He was principal bass of Civic Orchestra of Chicago and has served as a substitute with the Chicago Symphony Orchestra. He collaborated with choreographer Lauri Stallings and dancers from Hubbard Street Chicago and the Joffrey Ballet, developing an original work for solo double bass and dancers.

== Teaching ==
In 2007, he joined the full-time jazz faculty at the University of Illinois Urbana-Champaign where he is Assistant Professor of Double Bass in Jazz. He previously held positions at DePaul University, where he taught for nineteen years, and also at Northern Illinois University and the American Conservatory of Music. He participates as a clinician in high school and college jazz festivals.

== Discography ==
Album	Performer	Date	Label
Three Equals One	Larry Gray Trio	2011	Chicago Sessions
Made in Chicago	Jack DeJohnette with Muhal Richard Abrams, Roscoe Mitchell and Henry Threadgill	2015 (recorded 2013)	ECM
1, 2, 3...	Larry Gray Trio	2009	Chicago Sessions
Chet in Chicago	Chet Baker	2008	Enja
Blue Quest	Zvonimir Tot Trio	2006	Grove Art
Visions of the Moment	Betty Joplin	2005	Preserved Moments
With One Voice	Ramsey Lewis	2005	Narada
Gravity	Solo	2004	Graywater
Russian Romance	Ella Leyla	2004	B-Elite
Time Flies	Ramsey Lewis Trio	2004	Narada/EMI
Up Jumped Spring	Curtis Fuller	2004	Delmark
Delicate Hour	Patty Morabito	2003	LML
Simple Pleasures	Ramsey Lewis with Nancy Wilson	2003	Narada
The Power Trio: Live in Chicago	Larry Coryell	2003	HighNote
Meant to Be	Ramsey Lewis with Nancy Wilson	2002	Narada
We Are Not Machines	Bradley Parker-Sparrow	2001	Southport
Django by Ferro	Mike Ferro	2000	Denwa
Evening at Sea	Henry Johnson Quartet with Kenny Drew Jr.	2000	Chiaroscuro
A Jazz Christmas	Willie Pickens with Nicholas Payton	2000	Southport
The Windy Gap	Laurence Nugent	2000	Shanachie
Appassionata	Ramsey Lewis Trio	1999	Narada
Live at the Floating Jazz Festival	The Johnny Frigo Quartet	1999	Chiaroscuro
Pins and Needles	Frank Catalano with Randy Brecker	1999	Lake Shore
It's About Time	Willie Pickens	1998	Southport
Two for Two	Laurence Nugent	1998	Shanachie
Christmas in the Aire	Mannheim Steamroller	1995	American Gramaphone
Rain or Shine	Jodie Christian with Roscoe Mitchell	1994	Delmark
Where or When	Lin Halliday with Ira Sullivan	1994	Delmark
Solo and Quartet	Larry Gray Quintet (Larry Gray, composer/arranger)	1994	Premonition
Experience	Jodie Christian	1992	Delmark
