= Ira Sullivan (disambiguation) =

Ira Sullivan was an American musician. Ira Sullivan may also refer to:

- Ira Sullivan (1976 album), released on the Horizon label
- Ira Sullivan (1978 album), released on the Flying Fish label
