= Jay Anderson =

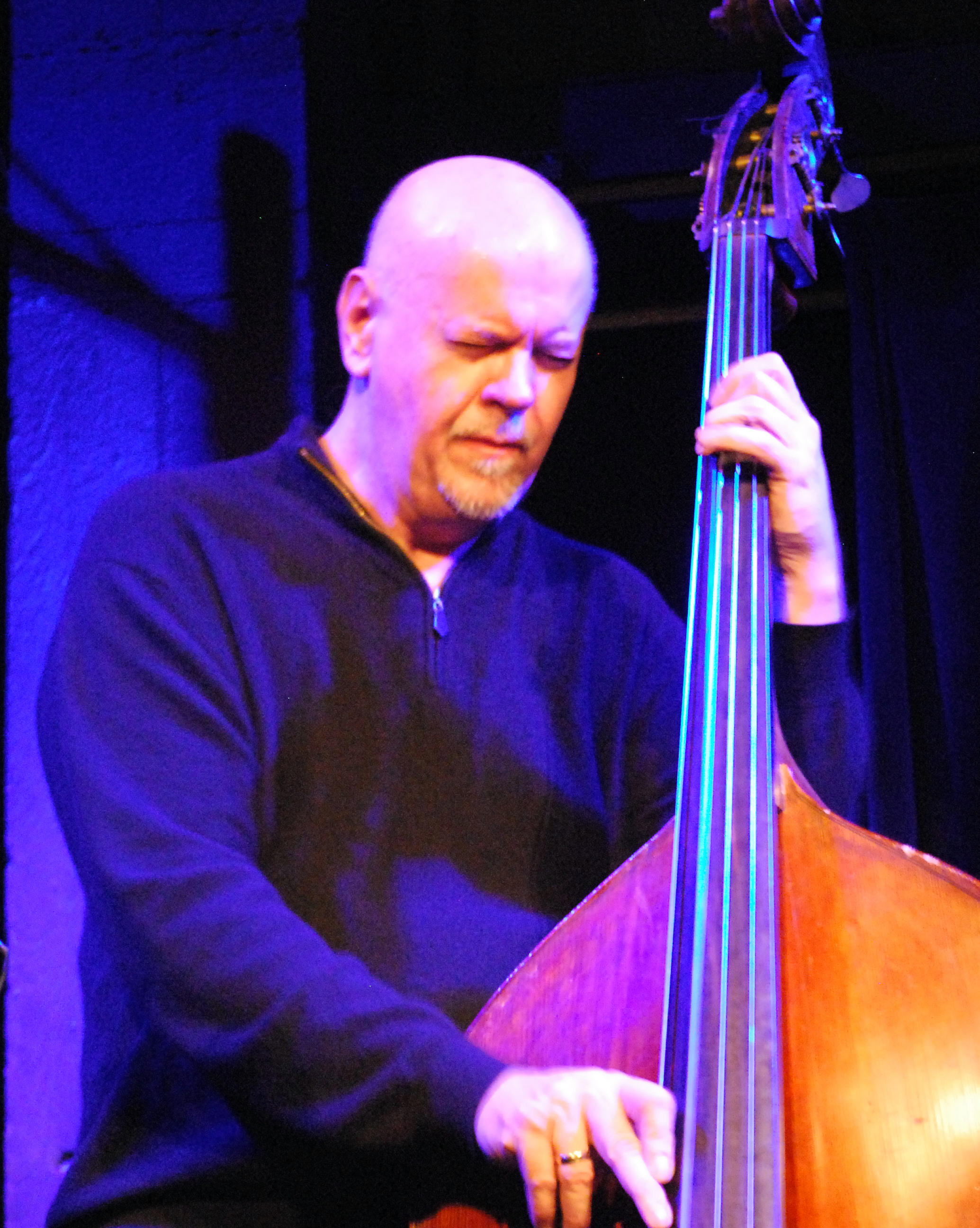
- Jay Anderson in 2011

Background information
- Born: October 24, 1955 (age 70); Upland, California
- Genres: Jazz
- Occupation: Musician
- Instrument: Double bass
- Labels: SteepleChase
- Website: jayandersonbass.com

Jay Anderson (born October 24, 1955) is an American jazz double-bassist and studio musician.

== Career ==
Anderson received a bachelor's degree from California State University, Long Beach in 1978, then worked with Woody Herman (1978-1979), Carmen McRae (1979-1981), and a quartet led by Ira Sullivan and Red Rodney (1981-1986). Anderson remained with Rodney through 1992, also working with Michael Brecker during this time, and played with Toots Thielemans and Joe Sample for much of the 1990s. As a sideman, he played with Randy Brecker, Michael Brecker, Eliane Elias, Toshiko Akiyoshi, Bennie Wallace, Brian Lynch, Bob Belden, Warren Bernhardt, Joey Calderazzo, Dave Stryker, Mike Stern, Chaka Khan, Terumasa Hino, Michel Legrand, Tiger Okoshi, Lynne Arriale, Bob Mintzer, George Cables, Paul Bley, Frank Zappa, Tom Waits, Dr. John, Rich Perry, Vic Juris, and Lee Konitz. He is a professor at Manhattan School of Music.

== Discography ==
=== As leader ===
- Next Exit (DMP, 1992)
- Local Color (DMP, 1994)
- Deepscape (SteepleChase, 2019)

=== As sideman ===
With Lynne Arriale

- The Eyes Have It (DMP, 1994)
- Live at Montreux (TCB, 2000)
- Inspiration (TCB, 2002)
- Arise (In+Out, 2004)
- Come Together (In+Out, 2004)
- Live (Motema Music, 2005)

With Bob Belden

- Straight to My Heart (Blue Note, 1991)
- Puccini's Turandot (Blue Note, 1993)
- Princejazz (Somethin' Else, 1994)
- La Cigale (Sunnyside, 1998)

With Warren Bernhardt

- Heat of the Moment (DMP, 1989)
- Ain't Life Grand (DMP, 1990)
- Reflections (DMP, 1991)
- So Real (DMP, 2001)
- Amelia's Song (DMP, 2002)

With Paul Bley

- If We May (SteepleChase, 1994)
- Speechless (SteepleChase, 1995)
- Reality Check (SteepleChase, 1996)
- Notes On Ornette (SteepleChase, 1998)

With George Cables

- I Mean You (SteepleChase, 1994)
- Skylark (SteepleChase, 1996)
- Dark Side, Light Side (SteepleChase, 1997)

With Stanley Cowell

- Are You Real? (SteepleChase, 2014)
- Reminiscent (SteepleChase, 2015)
- No Illusions (SteepleChase, 2017)

With Harold Danko

- Unriched (SteepleChase, 2012)
- Lost in the Breeze (SteepleChase, 2016)
- Triple Play (SteepleChase, 2017)

With Michael Davis

- Midnight Crossing (Lipstick, 1994)
- Brass Nation (Hip-Bone Music, 2000)
- Trumpets Eleven (Hip-Bone Music, 2003)

With Michael Franks

- Watching the Snow (Koch, 2003)
- Time Together (Shanachie, 2011)
- The Music in My Head (P-Vine 2018)

With Vic Juris

- For the Music (Jazzpoint, 1992)
- Pastels (SteepleChase, 1996)
- Moonscape (SteepleChase, 1997)
- Remembering Eric Dolphy (SteepleChase, 1999)
- Songbook (SteepleChase, 2000)
- Blue Horizon (Zoho, 2004)
- A Second Look (Mel Bay, 2005)
- Omega Is the Alpha (SteepleChase, 2010)
- Free Admission (SteepleChase, 2012)
- Walking On Water (SteepleChase, 2014)
- Blue (SteepleChase, 2015)
- Vic Juris Plays Victor Young (SteepleChase, 2016)
- Eye Contact (SteepleChase, 2018)
- Let's Cool One (SteepleChase, 2020)

With Frank Kimbrough

- Live at Kitano (Palmetto, 2012)
- Quartet (Palmetto, 2014)
- Solstice (Pirouet, 2016)

With Lee Konitz

- Dearly Beloved (SteepleChase, 1997)
- Out of Nowhere (SteepleChase, 1997)
- RichLee! (SteepleChase, 1998)

With Andy LaVerne

- Between Earth & Mars (SteepleChase, 2000)
- Know More (SteepleChase, 2001)
- Pianissimo (SteepleChase, 2002)

With Bob Mintzer

- Only in New York (DMP, 1994)
- Big Band Trane (DMP, 1996)
- Latin from Manhattan (DMP, 1998)
- Quality Time (TVT 1998)
- Gently (DMP, 2002)
- In the Moment (Art of Life, 2006)
- Old School New Lessons (MCG Jazz, 2006)
- Swing Out (MCG Jazz, 2008)

With Rich Perry

- Beautiful Love (SteepleChase, 1995)
- What Is This? (SteepleChase, 1996)
- Left Alone (SteepleChase, 1997)
- At the Kitano 2 (SteepleChase, 2008)
- Gone (SteepleChase, 2009)
- Time Was (SteepleChase, 2012)
- Mood (SteepleChase, 2016)
- Other Matters (SteepleChase, 2019)

With Red Rodney

- Spirit Within (Elektra/Musician, 1982)
- Sprint (Elektra/Musician, 1983)
- One for Bird (SteepleChase, 1988)
- No Turn On Red (Denon, 1989)
- Red Snapper (SteepleChase, 1989)
- Then and Now (Chesky, 1992)

With Joe Sample

- Old Places Old Faces (Warner Bros., 1996)
- Sample This (Warner Bros., 1997)
- The Song Lives On (PRA, 1999)
- The Pecan Tree (Videoarts, 2002)

With Maria Schneider

- Evanescence (Enja, 1994)
- Concert in the Garden (ArtistShare, 2004)
- Sky Blue (ArtistShare, 2007)
- The Thompson Fields (ArtistShare, 2015)
- Data Lords (ArtistShare, 2020)

With Louis Smith

- There Goes My Heart (SteepleChase, 1997)
- Soon (SteepleChase, 1998)
- The Bopsmith (SteepleChase, 2000)

With Mark Soskin

- 17 (TCB, 2001)
- Man Behind the Curtain (Kind of Blue, 2009)
- Hearts and Minds (SteepleChase, 2017)
- Upper West Side Stories (SteepleChase, 2018)
- Everything Old Is New Again (SteepleChase, 2020)

With Dave Stryker

- Passage (SteepleChase, 1993)
- Full Moon (SteepleChase, 1994)
- Blue to the Bone (SteepleChase, 1996)
- Blue to the Bone III (SteepleChase, 2002)
- Latest Outlook (Zoho, 2007)
- The Scene (Zoho, 2008)
- Keeper (Panorama, 2010)

With Frank Zappa

- Thing-Fish (EMI, 1984)
- Cheap Thrills (Rykodisc, 1998)
- The Man from Utopia (Limited Edition, 1999)

With others

- Toshiko Akiyoshi, Wishing Peace (Ken Music, 1986)
- Jamie Baum, Undercurrents (Konnex, 1992)
- Burak Bedikyan, New Beginning (SteepleChase, 2018)
- David Bowie, Nothing Has Changed (Columbia, 2014)
- David Bowie, Sue (or in a Season of Crime) (Parlophone, 2014)
- Michael Brecker, Now You See It... Now You Don't (GRP, 1990)
- Michael Brecker, The Cost of Living (Jazz Door, 1994)
- Gordon Brisker, The Gift (Naxos, 1997)
- Joey Calderazzo, In the Door (Blue Note, 1991)
- Joey Calderazzo, The Traveler (Blue Note, 1993)
- John Campbell, Turning Point (Contemporary, 1990)
- John Campbell, Workin' Out (Criss Cross, 2001)
- Jay Clayton, In and Out of Love (Sunnyside, 2010)
- Celine Dion, Falling Into You (Columbia, 1996)
- Pierre Dorge, Soundscapes (SteepleChase, 2018)
- Mike Fahn, Close Your Eyes and Listen (Sparky 1, 2002)
- Boulou Ferre & Elios Ferre, New York N.Y. (SteepleChase, 1997)
- Greg Gisbert, The Court Jester (Criss Cross, 1996)
- Osvaldo Golijov, Oceana (Deutsche Grammophone, 2007)
- Terumasa Hino, Live in Warsaw (Century, 1991)
- Mark Isaacs, Keeping the Standards (Vorticity, 2004)
- Mark Isaacs, Resurgence (ABC, 2007)
- Sara K., Play On Words (Chesky, 1994)
- Chaka Khan, Classikhan (AGU/Earthsong/Sanctuary Urban, 2004)
- Tony Lakatos, Standard Time (Skip, 2014)
- Brian Landrus, Generations (BlueLand, 2017)
- Rudy Linka, News from Home (Arta, 1992)
- Joe Locke, Sticks and Strings (Jazz Eyes, 2007)
- Brian Lynch, Peer Pressure (Criss Cross, 1987)
- Phil Markowitz, Catalysis (Sunnyside, 2008)
- Phil Markowitz, Perpetuity (Dot Time, 2014)
- Nellie McKay, Normal As Blueberry Pie (Verve, 2009)
- Carmen McRae, Carmen McRae Live at Bubba's (CMA, 1988)
- Tiger Okoshi, Echoes of a Note (JVC, 1993)
- Tiger Okoshi, Color of Soil (JVC, 1998)
- Dave Panichi, Blues for McCoy (Spirit Song, 1995)
- Mike Richmond, Tones for Joan's Bones (SteepleChase, 2018)
- Mike Richmond, La Vie En Rose (SteepleChase, 2019)
- Tim Ries, Stones World (Sunnyside, 2008)
- Terre Roche, Imprint Earth (Rock Wreckerds, 2015)
- Hal Schaefer, Solo Duo Trio (Discovery, 1992)
- Ken Schaphorst, How to Say Goodbye (JCA, 2016)
- Larry Schneider, Ali Girl (SteepleChase, 1997)
- Steve Slagle, Smoke Signals (Panorama, 1991)
- Steve Slagle, Steve Slagle Plays Monk (SteepleChase, 1998)
- Leni Stern, When Evening Falls (Leni Stern, 2004)
- Mike Stern, Standards (and Other Songs) (Atlantic, 1992)
- Ira Sullivan, Ira Sullivan Does It All (Muse, 1983)
- Toots Thielemans, The Live Takes Vol. 1 (In+Out, 2000)
- Artie Traum, Meetings with Remarkable Friends (Narada, 1999)
- Dawn Upshaw, Maria Schneider, Winter Morning Walks (ArtistShare, 2013)
- Roseanna Vitro, Softly (Concord Jazz, 1993)
- Tom Waits, Franks Wild Years (Island, 1987)
- Jeremy Wall, Stepping to the New World (Amherst, 1992)
- Bennie Wallace, Brilliant Corners (Denon, 1988)
- Walt Weiskopf, Exact Science (Iris, 1989)
- Walt Weiskopf, Mindwalking (Iris, 1990)
- Peter Zak, Standards (SteepleChase, 2016)
