= Duffy Jackson =

American jazz drummer (1953–2021)

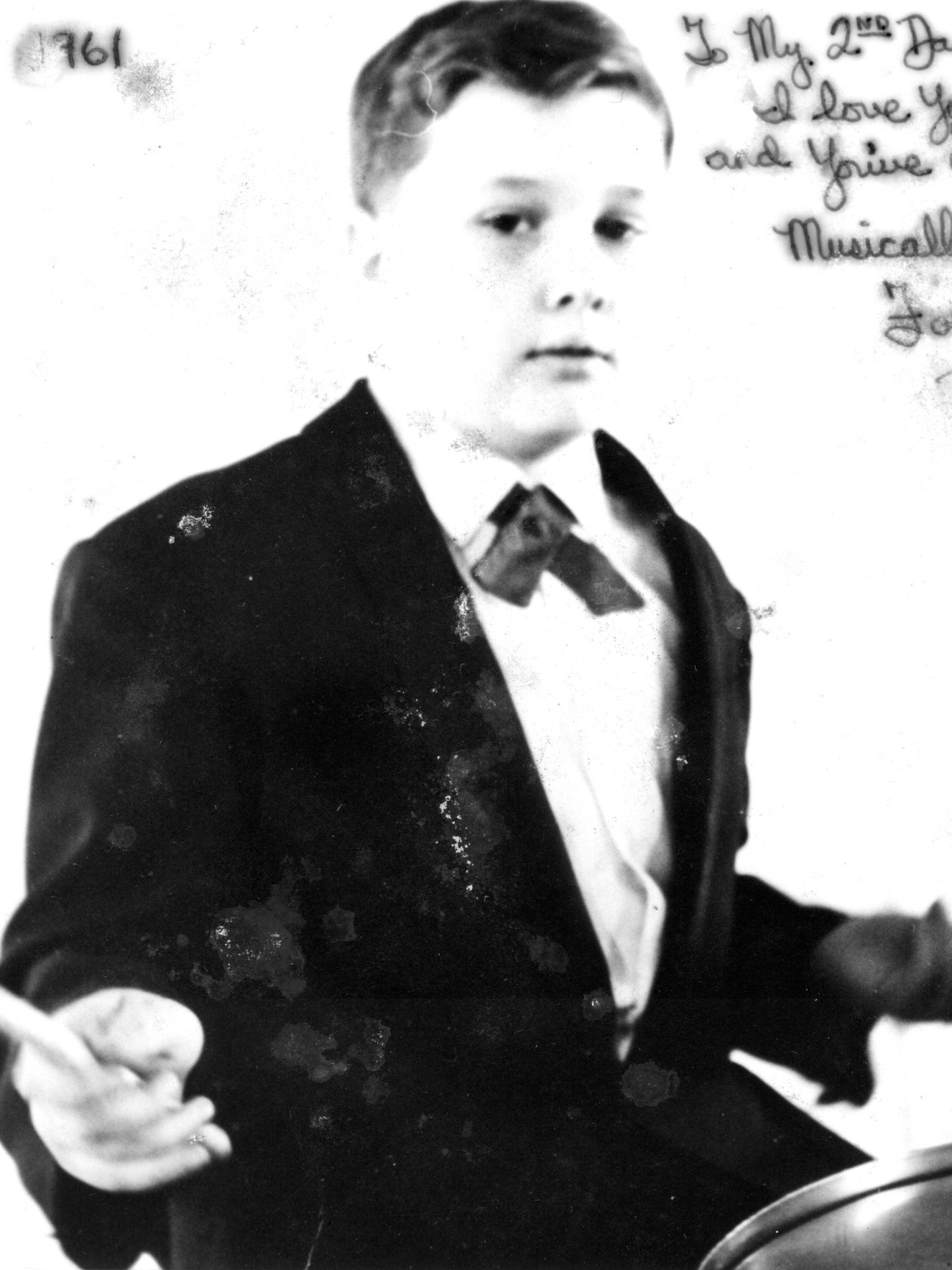

Background information
- Born: July 3, 1953; Freeport, New York, US
- Died: March 3, 2021 (aged 67) Nashville, Tennessee, US
- Genres: jazz
- Instruments: drums

Duff Clark "Duffy" Jackson (July 3, 1953 – March 3, 2021) was an American jazz drummer.

== Career ==
Born in Freeport, New York, Jackson was the son of jazz double-bassist and band leader Chubby Jackson. He played drums as a young child, making appearances with Count Basie, Duke Ellington, Woody Herman, and Buddy Rich before he finished high school. In 1971 he relocated to Los Angeles, where he played with Monty Alexander, Ray Brown, Herb Ellis, Lena Horne, Milt Jackson, and Barney Kessel. Following a tour of Japan with Benny Carter, he appeared on television for two years with Sammy Davis Jr. (1974–1976). Later in the 1970s he played with Grover Mitchell and did a tour of Europe with the Count Basie Orchestra.

Jackson appeared on the CBS television program, I've Got a Secret, on the September 7, 1960 episode. He was seven years-old at the time. His secret was, “I formed my own jazz band”.

In the 1980s, Jackson worked with Lionel Hampton, Al Jarreau, James Moody, and Sonny Stitt, and in 1985 re-joined the Basie orchestra while Thad Jones was its leader. Following this he worked with Illinois Jacquet and Artie Shaw, then re-joined the Basie Orchestra under Frank Foster. In the 1990s, he relocated to Fort Lauderdale, where he played with Harry Allen, Billy Ross, and the Manhattan Transfer; Jackson moved to Nashville, TN in the late 2000s and started to front his own big band.

He died aged 67 in Nashville, Tennessee, on March 3, 2021.

== Discography ==
=== As leader ===
- Swing! Swing! Swing! (Milestone, 1995)

=== As sideman ===
With Monty Alexander

- Here Comes the Sun (MPS/BASF, 1972)
- Jamento (Pablo, 1978)
- Look Up (Atlas, 1983)
- Live at the Cully Select Jazz Festival 1991 (Limetree, 1991)

With Sonny Stitt

- Sonny, Sweets & Jaws (Who's Who in Jazz, 1982)
- Sonny's Blues (Who's Who in Jazz, 1983)
- What's New (CMA, 1995)

With others

- Count Basie, Kansas City Shout (Pablo, 1980)
- George Benson, Big Boss Band (Warner Bros., 1990)
- Cleveland Eaton, Strolling with the Count (Ovation, 1980)
- Roy Gerson, That Gerson Person (Jazz Alliance, 1992)
- Lionel Hampton, Made in Japan (Timeless, 1983)
- Jon Hendricks, Freddie Freeloader (Denon, 1990)
- Chubby Jackson, Lucky 7 (Time Is, 1991)
- Illinois Jacquet, Jacquet's Got It (Atlantic, 1988)
- The Manhattan Transfer, Swing (Atlantic, 1997)
- Eddie Miller, It's Miller Time (Famous Door, 1980)
- Grover Mitchell, Meet Grover Mitchell (Jazz Chronicles, 1979)
- Othello Molineaux, It's About Time (Big World Music, 1993)
- Ira Sullivan, The Incredible Ira Sullivan (Stash, 1980)
- Axel Zwingenberger, The Boogie Woogie Album (Telefunken, 1982)

== Bibliography ==
- Rick Mattingly, "Duffy Jackson". The New Grove Dictionary of Jazz. 2nd edition, ed. Barry Kernfeld.
