= Soft Hands =

Soft Hands may refer to:

- Soft Hands (film), a 1964 Egyptian comedy film
- Soft Hands (album), a 2007 album by Ron McClure
