= Sprint (album) =

Live album by Red Rodney and Ira Sullivan Quintet
- Released: 1983
- Recorded: November 3 & 4, 1982
- Venue: The Jazz Forum, NYC
- Genre: Jazz
- Length: 40:25
- Label: Elektra/Musician; 60261
- Producer: Mike Berniker

Red Rodney chronology
Spirit Within (1981)	Sprint (1983)	Social Call (1984)

Ira Sullivan chronology
Spirit Within (1981)	Sprint (1982)	Strings Attached (1983)

Sprint is a live album by the Red Rodney and Ira Sullivan Quintet which was recorded in 1982 and released on the Elektra/Musician label the following year.

== Reception ==
Professional ratings
Review scores
Source	Rating
AllMusic	4.5/5 stars

The AllMusic review by Scott Yanow stated "The last of six LPs by the Red Rodney-Ira Sullivan Quintet was also the band's finest. There are times in the music where the group sounds like the early Ornette Coleman Quartet. The setting and advanced repertoire clearly challenged Rodney and inspired Sullivan. A post-bop gem, one of Rodney's finest recordings".

== Track listing ==
All compositions by Garry Dial except where noted.

1. "How Do You Know" – 7:23
2. "As Time Goes By" (Herman Hupfeld) – 7:35
3. "Sprint" – 7:36
4. "My Son, the Minstrel" – 6:05
5. "Speak Like a Child" (Herbie Hancock) – 11:46

== Personnel ==
- Red Rodney – trumpet, flugelhorn
- Ira Sullivan - flute, soprano saxophone, alto saxophone, flugelhorn
- Garry Dial – piano
- Jay Anderson – bass
- Jeff Hirshfield – drums
