= Red Tornado (disambiguation) =

Red Tornado is a fictional character appearing in American comic books published by DC Comics.

Red Tornado may also refer to:

- The Red Tornado (album), an album by Red Rodney
