= Spirit Within =

1982 jazz album by Red Rodney and Ira Sullivan

Studio album by Red Rodney and Ira Sullivan
- Released: 1982
- Recorded: September 21–24, 1981
- Studio: CBS Studios, New York
- Genre: Jazz
- Length: 37:30
- Label: Elektra/Musician; E1-60020
- Producer: Mike Berniker

Red Rodney chronology
Night and Day (1981)	Spirit Within (1982)	Sprint (1982)

Ira Sullivan chronology
Ira Sullivan Does It All (1981)	Spirit Within (1982)	Sprint (1983)

Spirit Within is an album by trumpeter Red Rodney and multi-instrumentalist Ira Sullivan which was recorded and released on the Elektra/Musician label in 1982.

== Reception ==
Professional ratings
Review scores
Source	Rating
AllMusic	4.5/5 stars

The AllMusic review by Scott Yanow stated "By the time of their fifth record, the Red Rodney-Ira Sullivan Quintet also included pianist Garry Dial, bassist Jay Anderson and drummer Steve Bagby, and it was a perfect vehicle for the co-leaders. Rodney was challenged by the advanced material, and underground legend Sullivan received more exposure than he had ever had in his career. On this LP, Sullivan inspired Rodney to some of his finest playing. Superior post-bop music".

== Track listing ==
All compositions by Garry Dial except where noted.

1. "Sophisticated Yenta" – 5:55
2. "King of France" – 5:21
3. "Spirit Within" – 7:46
4. "Island Song" – 6:05
5. "Monday's Dance" (Ira Sullivan) – 5:48
6. "Crescent City" (Jeff Meyer) – 6:35

== Personnel ==
- Red Rodney – trumpet, flugelhorn
- Ira Sullivan - flute, soprano saxophone, flugelhorn, percussion
- Garry Dial – piano
- Jay Anderson – bass
- Steve Bagby – drums, percussion
