= Jodie Christian =

American jazz pianist (1932–2012)

Jodie Christian (February 2, 1932 – February 13, 2012) was an American jazz pianist, noted for bebop and free jazz.

== Early life ==
Christian was born in Chicago, Illinois. His "father was born in Little Rock, Arkansas, into a share-cropper's family. Realizing the futility of that life, Christian's grandfather sold his livestock and sent his family to Chicago, where Christian was born in 1932 on 44th Street and Prairie Avenue." Christian's mother, a church pianist, helped him with music. When she became director of the church choir, he took over on the piano; sometimes they played organ–piano duets in the church. His father "also sang and played the blues on piano in speakeasies and rent parties, but ultimately stopped performing and followed his wife into the church".

Christian attended Wendell Phillips High in Chicago.

== Later life and career ==
Christian was one of the founders of the Association for the Advancement of Creative Musicians (AACM) with pianist Muhal Richard Abrams, drummer Steve McCall, and composer Phil Cohran. He and Abrams were also part of the Experimental Band. Christian worked at the Jazz Showcase club in Chicago and performed with Eddie Harris, Stan Getz, Dexter Gordon, Gene Ammons, Roscoe Mitchell, Buddy Montgomery, Judy Roberts, and John Klemmer. Christian led a group on albums. He died on February 13, 2012, aged 80, in Chicago.

== Discography ==
=== As leader or co-leader ===
- Experience (Delmark, 1992)
- Rain or Shine (Delmark, 1994)
- Blues Holiday (SteepleChase, 1994)
- The Very Thought of You (SteepleChase, 1995) with Louis Smith
- Front Line (Delmark, 1996)
- Soul Fountain (Delmark, 1998)
- Reminiscing (Delmark, 2001)

=== As sideman ===
With Gene Ammons

- The Chase! (Prestige, 1970) with Dexter Gordon
- Chicago Concert (Prestige, 1973) with James Moody

With Von Freeman

- Never Let Me Go (Steeplechase, 1992)
- Lester Leaps In (Steeplechase, 1993)
- Dedicated to You (Steeplechase, 1994)

With Brad Goode

- Shock of the New (Delmark, 1988)
- Toy Trumpet (SteepleChase, 2000)

With Lin Halliday

- Delayed Exposure (Delmark, 1991)
- East of the Sun (Delmark, 1992)
- Where or When (Delmark, 1994) with Ira Sullivan
- Airegin (Delmark, 2000)

With Eddie Harris

- The Electrifying Eddie Harris (Atlantic, 1967)
- Pourquoi L'Amérique (Atlantic, 1968)
- Plug Me In (Atlantic, 1968)
- Silver Cycles (Atlantic, 1969)
- High Voltage (Atlantic, 1969)
- Free Speech (Atlantic, 1970)
- Live at Newport (Atlantic, 1971)
- Excursions (Atlantic, 1973)

With John Klemmer

- Involvement: The John Klemmer Quartets (Cadet, 1967)
- And We Were Lovers (Cadet, 1968)

With Roscoe Mitchell

- The Flow of Things (Black Saint, 1986)
- Hey Donald (Delmark, 1995)
- In Walked Buckner (Delmark, 1999)

With Ira Sullivan

- The Ira Sullivan Quintet (Delmark, 1960) reissued in 1988 as Blue Stroll
- Bird Lives! (Vee-Jay, 1962)
- Nicky's Tune (Delmark, 1970)
- Ira Sullivan (Flying Fish, 1978) reissued in 2014 as Circumstantial

With others

- Eric Alexander: Stablemates (Delmark, 1996) with Lin Halliday
- Stan Getz: Stan Meets Chet (Verve, 1958) with Chet Baker
- Dexter Gordon: Featuring Joe Newman (Monad, 1976)
- Al Green/Othello Anderson Quintet: Mr. Lucky (Delmark, 2002)
- Melvin Jackson: Funky Skull (Limelight, 1969)
- Carl Leukaufe: Warrior (Delmark, 1996)
- Les McCann: Invitation to Openness (Atlantic, 1972)
- Buddy Montgomery: This Rather Than That (Impulse!, 1970)
- James Moody: Sax and Flute Man (Paula, 1973)
- Harold Ousley: Grit-Grittin' Feelin (Delmark, 2000)
- Paul Serrano: Blues Holiday (Riverside, 1961)
- Louis Smith: Silvering (Steeplechase, 1994)
- Mike Smith: Unit 7: A Tribute to Cannonball Adderley (Delmark, 1990)
- Sonny Stitt: Soul Girl (Paula, 1973)
- Jesse Thomas: Blues is a Feeling (Delmark, 2001)
- Various artists: Charlie Parker Memorial Concert (Cadet, 1970)
- Frank Walton: Reality (Delmark, 1978)
- Juli Wood: Movin and Groovin (self-released, 1998)
- Webster Young: Plays the Miles Davis Songbook (VGM, 1981)
