= Dearly Beloved (Lee Konitz album) =

Studio album by Lee Konitz
- Released: June 24, 1997
- Recorded: October 1996
- Genre: Jazz
- Length: 64:26
- Label: SteepleChase; SCCD 31406
- Producer: Nils Winther

Lee Konitz chronology
Inside Rodgers (1996)	Dearly Beloved (1997)	Unaccompanied Live in Yokohama (1996)

Professional ratings
Review scores
Source	Rating
AllMusic	3/5 stars
The Penguin Guide to Jazz Recordings	3.5/4 stars

Dearly Beloved is an album by the American jazz saxophonist Lee Konitz, recorded in 1996 and released on the Danish SteepleChase label.

== Track listing ==
1. "The Way You Look Tonight" (Jerome Kern, Dorothy Fields) – 11:38
2. "Ev'ry Time We Say Goodbye" (Cole Porter) – 7:45
3. "Someday My Prince Will Come" (Frank Churchill, Larry Morey) – 8:07
4. "Bye Bye Blackbird" (Ray Henderson, Mort Dixon) – 11:32
5. "Dearly Beloved" (Kern, Johnny Mercer) – 10:53
6. "The Night Has a Thousand Eyes" (Jerry Brainin, Buddy Bernier) – 14:24

== Personnel ==
- Lee Konitz – alto saxophone, soprano saxophone
- Harold Danko – piano
- Jay Anderson – bass
- Billy Drummond – drums
