= East of the Sun (Lin Halliday album) =

Studio album by Lin Halliday
- Released: 1992
- Recorded: November 27, 1991
- Studio: P.S. Studio, Chicago
- Genre: Jazz
- Length: 64:27
- Label: Delmark
- Producer: Robert G. Koester

Lin Halliday chronology
Delayed Exposure (1991)	East of the Sun (1992)	Where or When (1994)

East of the Sun is the second album by American jazz saxophonist Lin Halliday, which was recorded in 1991 and released on Delmark. He leads a quintet with trumpeter Ira Sullivan, pianist Jodie Christian, bassist Dennis Carroll and drummer George Fludas, the same lineup as his debut album Delayed Exposure.

== Reception ==
Professional ratings
Review scores
Source	Rating
AllMusic	4.5/5 stars
The Penguin Guide to Jazz	3/4 stars

In his review for AllMusic, Alex Henderson notes "Like its predecessor, East of the Sun makes listeners wish a label had offered Halliday a deal 20 or 30 years earlier."

The Penguin Guide to Jazz states "The second album is a plain-and-simple second helping, but one can't expect fresh initiatives from a seasoned campaigner at this stage: just good, genuine jazz."

== Track listing ==
1. "All the Things You Are" (Jerome Kern, Oscar Hammerstein II) – 6:10
2. "East of the Sun" (Brooks Bowman) – 5:31
3. "I Found a New Baby" (Jack Palmer, Spencer Williams) – 6:16
4. "Indian Summer" (Victor Herbert, Al Dubin) – 5:42
5. "My Foolish Heart" (Victor Young, Ned Washington) – 8:48
6. "Corcovado" (Antônio Carlos Jobim) – 8:16
7. "Paradox" (Sonny Rollins) – 6:58
8. "Ira's Blues" (Ira Sullivan) – 8:29
9. "Will You Still Be Mine" (Matt Dennis, Tom Adair) – 8:17

== Personnel ==
- Lin Halliday – tenor sax
- Ira Sullivan – trumpet, flugelhorn, tenor sax, flute
- Jodie Christian – piano
- Dennis Carroll – bass
- George Fludas – drums
