= Blue Stroll =

Studio album by Ira Sullivan
- Released: 1961
- Recorded: July 26, 1959
- Studio: Richard Cunliffe Studio, Chicago
- Genre: Jazz
- Length: 38:21 (LP); 53:58 (CD)
- Label: Delmark
- Producer: Robert G. Koester

Ira Sullivan chronology
Nicky's Tune (1958)	Blue Stroll (1961)	Bird Lives! (1962)

reissue cover

Blue Stroll is an album by American jazz multi-instrumentalist Ira Sullivan, which was recorded in 1959 and released on Delmark. He leads a quintet with saxophonist Johnny Griffin, pianist Jodie Christian, bassist Victor Sproles and drummer Wilbur Campbell.

== Reception ==
Professional ratings
Review scores
Source	Rating
AllMusic	4/5 stars
The Penguin Guide to Jazz	3/4 stars

In his review for AllMusic, Alex Henderson states "Many of Chicago's bop musicians have lamented Sullivan's decision to move to Florida and wish he had never left Chi-Town; listening to the rewarding Blue Stroll, it isn't hard to understand why they feel that way."

The Penguin Guide to Jazz notes about Griffin "who barges and blusters his way through his solos, tossing out tags and quotes as if to remind the others what else was going on in the world."

== Track listing ==
1. "Wilbur's Tune" (Wilbur Campbell) – 6:03
2. "My Old Flame" (Arthur Johnston, Sam Coslow) – 6:40
3. "Blue Stroll" (Jodie Christian) – 5:52
4. "63rd Street Theme" (Johnny Griffin) – 7:24 Bonus track on CD
5. "Bluzinbee" – 19:46
6. "Wilbur's Tune, Alternate" (Wilbur Campbell) – 8:13 Bonus track on CD

== Personnel ==
- Ira Sullivan – trumpet, baritone sax, peck horn, alto sax
- Johnny Griffin – alto sax, tenor sax, baritone sax
- Jodie Christian – piano
- Victor Sproles – bass
- Wilbur Campbell – drums
