= Soul Fountain (Jodie Christian album) =

Studio album by Jodie Christian
- Released: 1998
- Recorded: January 1996
- Genre: Jazz
- Length: 59:05
- Label: Delmark; 498

Jodie Christian chronology
Front Line (1996)	Soul Fountain (1998)	Reminiscing (2001)

Soul Fountain is an album by pianist Jodie Christian. It was recorded during January 1996, and was released in 1998 by Delmark Records. On the album, Christian is joined by saxophonists Art Porter and Roscoe Mitchell, trumpeter Odies Williams III, bassist John Whitfield, and drummer Ernie Adams. Soul Fountain is dedicated to the memory of Art Porter, who died in November 1996.

== Reception ==
Professional ratings
Review scores
Source	Rating
AllMusic	4/5 stars
The Penguin Guide to Jazz	3/4 stars

In a review for AllMusic, Tim Sheridan called the album "pleasant blend of bop and romance," and wrote: "Christians's originals focus primarily on space rather than melody, save the lovely 'Jeremy,' which brings Vince Guaraldi immediately to mind. A strong effort overall."

The authors of The Penguin Guide to Jazz Recordings stated: "The piano solos 'Everlasting Life' and 'Blessings' are further evidence of Christian's gifts, and the lovely duet with Porter on 'My One and Only Love' makes a touching farewell to the since-departed altoman."

Jack Bowers of All About Jazz described the album as "a session that traverses the landscape from conventional blues, ballads and bop to atonal experimentation and conversation," and called Christian "an outstanding and vastly underrated player."

Writing for JazzTimes, Harvey Pekar commented: "One of the most dependable and versatile jazzmen in Chicago for decades, [Christian] can play lyrical, swinging straightahead solos or go outside, according to the situation. This CD illustrates his adaptability and contains some of the better examples of his recorded work."

== Track listing ==
1. "Soda Fountain" (Clifford Jordan) – 6:09
2. "My One and Only Love" (Guy Wood, Robert Mellin) – 7:38
3. "Everlasting Life" (Sonny Seals) – 5:28
4. "Abstract Impressions" (Jodie Christian) – 3:04
5. "That Bright Star" (Evod Magek) – 5:19
6. "Consequences" (Jodie Christian) – 10:25
7. "Jeremy" (Jodie Christian) – 6:38
8. "Blessings" (Jodie Christian) – 3:15
9. "Now's the Time" (Charlie Parker) – 10:38

== Personnel ==
- Jodie Christian – piano
- Art Porter – alto saxophone
- Roscoe Mitchell – flute, soprano saxophone, alto saxophone
- Dr. Odies Williams III – trumpet
- John Whitfield – bass
- Ernie Adams – drums
