= Horizons (Ira Sullivan album) =

Studio album by Ira Sullivan
- Released: 1967
- Recorded: March 2, 1967
- Studios: Criteria Recording Studio, Miami, FL
- Genre: Jazz
- Labels: Atlantic; SD 1476
- Producers: Jerry Wexler, Tom Dowd

Ira Sullivan chronology
Bird Lives! (1962)	Horizons (1967)	Ira Sullivan (1976)

Horizons is an album by multi-instrumentalist Ira Sullivan which was recorded in 1967 and released on the Atlantic label.

== Reception ==
Professional ratings
Review scores
Source	Rating
AllMusic	4/5 stars

The AllMusic review by Scott Yanow stated "Ira Sullivan's first recording in five years (which was originally released on Atlantic) features him switching between soprano, tenor, trumpet and flugelhorn with a quintet consisting of some obscure Florida players ... The relaxed and thought-provoking performances of tunes ranging from "Norwegian Wood" and "Everything Happens to Me" to group originals display a solid group sound and Sullivan's interest in integrating freer music and ideas into his playing".

== Track listing ==
All compositions by Ira Sullivan except where noted

1. "E Flat Tuba G" – 5:00
2. "Norwegian Wood" (John Lennon, Paul McCartney ) – 5:07
3. "Everything Happens to Me" (Matt Dennis, Tom Adair) – 5:43
4. "Adah" (Luchi de Jesus) – 4:54
5. "Horizons" (Dolphe Castellano) – 8:26
6. "Oh Gee!" (Matthew Gee) – 3:17
7. "Nineveh" – 8:53

== Personnel ==
- Ira Sullivan – soprano saxophone, tenor saxophone, trumpet, flugelhorn
- Lon Norman – trombone, euphonium
- Dolphe Castellano – piano, keyboards
- William Fry– bass
- Jose Cigno – drums, timpani
