= Strings Attached (Ira Sullivan album) =

Studio album by Ira Sullivan
- Released: 1983
- Recorded: January/July 1982 and May 1983
- Studio: Coconuts Recording Co., Miami, Fla.
- Genre: Jazz
- Length: 33:43
- Label: Strings Attached; AR7140
- Producer: David Einhorn

Ira Sullivan chronology
Sprint (1982)	Strings Attached (1983)	After Hours (1996)

Strings Attached is an album by multi-instrumentalist Ira Sullivan which was recorded in January and July 1982, and May 1983, in Miami, Florida. The album was first released on the Miami-based label Strings Attached in 1983. The record was subsequently reissued on the Pausa label in 1985 (Catalog No.: PR 7169). The record was released on CD with three additional tracks by Unicorn Productions in 1996, under the title "Strings Attached – Update!"

== Reception ==
Professional ratings
Review scores
Source	Rating
AllMusic	3/5 stars

The AllMusic review by Scott Yanow stated "This obscure LP features Sullivan on trumpet, flugelhorn and flute joined by saxophonist John Alexander, a rhythm section and a string quartet. Sullivan and the younger players perform six group originals that emphasize the lyrical side of the great multi-instrumentalist and effectively blend together the strings with the jazz ensemble".

== LP Track listing ==
The track listing of the original LP is as follows:

Side One
No.	Title	Writer(s)	Length
1.	"Our Love and Spirit"	David Einhorn	4:38
2.	"Late Nights"	David Einhorn, Peter Einhorn	5:37
3.	"Looking Glass Falls"	David Einhorn	4:59

Side Two
No.	Title	Writer(s)	Length
1.	"The Kingdom Within You"	David Einhorn	6:05
2.	"Ballad"	John Alexander	4:28
3.	"Wonderful Sound"	Nicole Yarling	7:56

== CD Track listing ==
The track listing of the Unicorn Productions CD "Strings Attached – Update!" is as follows:

No.	Title	Writer(s)	Length
1.	"Our Love and Spirit"	David Einhorn	4:38
2.	"Late Nights"	David Einhorn, Peter Einhorn	5:37
3.	"Looking Glass Falls"	David Einhorn	4:59
4.	"The Kingdom Within You"	David Einhorn	6:05
5.	"Ballad"	John Alexander	4:28
6.	"Wonderful Sound"	Nicole Yarling	7:56
7.	"Brothers"	John Alexander	8:19
8.	"Peacock Blues"	John Alexander	5:21
9.	"Vento Bravo"	Edu Lôbo	11:16

== Personnel ==
- Ira Sullivan – flute, alto flute, trumpet, flugelhorn
- John Alexander – soprano saxophone, tenor saxophone, flute, alto flute
- Laurie Haines – cello
- Peter Einhorn – electric guitar, acoustic guitar
- Nicole Yarling – violin, vocals
- Nancy Nosal – violin
- Debbie Spring – viola
- David Einhorn – bass
- Don Militello - Piano
- David Murphy ("Looking Glass Falls"), Gavin Davies ("Late Nights"), John Yarling – drums
- Robert Thomas, Jr. – hand drums
