= Harold Danko =

American jazz pianist

- Born: 13 June 1947 (age 79)
- Origin: Sharon, Pennsylvania
- Genres: Jazz
- Occupation: Musician
- Instrument: Piano
- Years active: 1975–present
- Labels: Inner City, Sunnyside, SteepleChase

Harold Danko (born June 13, 1947 in Ohio) is an American jazz pianist.

Danko attended Youngstown State University. Among his credits are work in the big bands of Woody Herman and Thad Jones/Mel Lewis, as well as smaller ensembles with Gerry Mulligan, Chet Baker and Lee Konitz. He worked often with Rich Perry in the 1990s and also played with Rufus Reid, Kirk Lightsey, Jeff Hirshfield, Edward Simon, and Gregory Herbert.

In 1999, Danko released a solo piano tribute album to Chet Baker titled This Isn't Maybe.

Danko was also the teacher at the Manhattan School of Music, of Grammy Award Winner Luis Perdomo (pianist).

== Discography ==
=== As leader ===
Year recorded	Title	Label	Notes
1974	Harold Danko Quartet	Inner City	Quartet, with Gregory Herbert (tenor sax), Dave Shapiro (bass), Jimmy Madison (drums)
1979	Coincidence	Dreamstreet	Quintet, with Frank Tiberi (tenor sax/bassoon), Tom Harrell (trumpet/flugelhorn), Rufus Reid (bass), Joe LaBarbera (drums)
1979?	Chasin' the Bad Guys	Inner City	
1982?	Mirth Song	Sunnyside	
1983	Shorter by Two	Sunnyside	Duo, with Kirk Lightsey
1983	Ink and Water	Sunnyside	
1985?	Alone but Not Forgotten	Sunnyside	
1988?	The First Love Song	Jazz City	
1993	Next Age	SteepleChase	Quartet, with Rich Perry (tenor sax), Scott Colley (bass), Jeff Hirshfield (drums)
1994	After the Rain	SteepleChase	Solo piano
1995	New Autumn	SteepleChase	Quartet, with Rich Perry (tenor sax), Scott Colley (bass), Jeff Hirshfield (drums)
1995–96	Tidal Breeze	SteepleChase	Quartet, with Rich Perry (tenor sax), Scott Colley (bass), Jeff Hirshfield (drums)
1996	The Feeling of Jazz	SteepleChase	Quartet, with Rich Perry (tenor sax), Scott Colley (bass), Jeff Hirshfield (drums)
1997	Stable Mates	SteepleChase	Quartet, with Rich Perry (tenor sax), Scott Colley (bass), Jeff Hirshfield (drums)
1997	Three of Four	SteepleChase	Trio, with Scott Colley (bass), Jeff Hirshfield (drums)
1998	...This Isn't Maybe	SteepleChase	Solo piano
2000	Nightscapes	SteepleChase	Quartet, with Rich Perry (tenor sax), Scott Colley (bass), Jeff Hirshfield (drums)
2001	Prestigious: A Tribute to Eric Dolphy	SteepleChase	Quintet, with Rich Perry (tenor sax), Dave Ballou (trumpet), Michael Formanek (bass), Jeff Hirshfield (drums)
2002	Fantasy Exit	SteepleChase	Trio, with Michael Formanek (bass), Jeff Hirshfield (drums)
2003	Trilix	SteepleChase	Trio, with Michael Formanek (bass), Jeff Hirshfield (drums)
2004	Hinesight	SteepleChase	Trio, with Michael Formanek (bass), Jeff Hirshfield (drums)
2005	Oatts & Perry	SteepleChase	Quintet, with Rich Perry (tenor sax), Dick Oatts (alto sax), Michael Formanek (bass), Jeff Hirshfield (drums)
2006	Times Remembered	SteepleChase	Trio, with Michael Formanek (bass), Jeff Hirshfield (drums)
2007?	Wonderland	SteepleChase	Duo, with Ron McClure (bass)
2008?	Escapades	SteepleChase	Trio, with Michael Formanek (bass), Jeff Hirshfield (drums)
2009?	Oatts & Perry II	SteepleChase	Quintet, with Rich Perry (tenor sax), Dick Oatts (alto sax), Michael Formanek (bass), Jeff Hirshfield (drums)
2011?	Unriched	SteepleChase	Trio, with Jay Anderson (bass), Jeff Hirshfield (drums)
2012?	Oatts & Perry III	SteepleChase	Quintet, with Rich Perry (tenor sax), Dick Oatts (alto sax), Michael Formanek (bass), Jeff Hirshfield (drums)
2014？	Sweet Nowhere	SteepleChase	Duo, with Dick Oatts (alto sax)
2015?	Lost in the Breeze	SteepleChase	Trio, with Jay Anderson (bass), Jeff Hirshfield (drums)
2016	Triple Play	SteepleChase	Trio, with Jay Anderson (bass), Jeff Hirshfield (drums)
2019	Play Date	SteepleChase	
2021	Spring Garden	SteepleChase	
2022	Rite Notes	SteepleChase	

Main source:

=== As sideman ===
With Chet Baker

- Once Upon a Summertime (Artists House, 1977 [1980])
- As Time Goes By (Timeless, 1986)
- Cool Cat (Timeless, 1986 [1989])
- Chet Baker in Tokyo (King Records, 1988)

With Thad Jones and Mel Lewis

- The Thad Jones Mel Lewis Quartet (Artists House, 1978)

With Lee Konitz

- Yes, Yes, Nonet (SteepleChase, 1979)
- Dovetail (Sunnyside, 1983)
- Ideal Scene (Soul Note, 1986)
- The New York Album (Soul Note, 1988)
- Once Upon a Line (Musidisc, 1990)
- Dearly Beloved (SteepleChase, 1996)
- RichLee! (SteepleChase, 1997) with Rich Perry

With Artt Frank & Pat Morrissey

- Souvenir (mja Records, 1999)
