= The Incredible Ira Sullivan =

1980 studio album by Ira Sullivan

Studio album by Ira Sullivan
- Released: 1980
- Recorded: June 1980
- Studio: Lobel Studios, West New York, NJ
- Genre: Jazz
- Length: 41:24
- Label: Stash; ST-208
- Producer: Bernard Brightman

Ira Sullivan chronology
| Alive in New York (1980) | The Incredible Ira Sullivan (1980) | Night and Day (1981) |

The Incredible Ira Sullivan, (full title The Incredible Ira Sullivan Plays Flugelhorn, Trumpet, Alto and Tenor Saxes, Flute and Afuche Cabasa), is an album by multi-instrumentalist Ira Sullivan which was recorded in 1980 and released on the Stash label in 1981.

== Reception ==
Professional ratings
Review scores
| Source | Rating |
|---|---|
| AllMusic | 4.5/5 stars |

The AllMusic review by Scott Yanow stated "The title of this LP is not hype, for Ira Sullivan throughout the date shows off his impressive improvising skills ... He displays both his mastery of bop and of more advanced (and freer) ideas. A pretty definitive session by the underrated Ira Sullivan".

== Track listing ==
1. "Lonely Moments" (Simon Salz) – 4:47
2. "Our Delight" (Tadd Dameron) – 4:58
3. "Bernie's Tune" (Bernie Miller) – 4:40
4. "Kim's Lament" (Hale Rood) – 4:50
5. "Can't Get Out of This Mood" (Frank Loesser, Jimmy McHugh) – 7:34
6. "On the Seventh Day" (Jack Walrath) – 7:35
7. "Satin Doll (Duke Ellington, Billy Strayhorn, Johnny Mercer) – 7:00

== Personnel ==
- Ira Sullivan – flute, alto saxophone, tenor saxophone, trumpet, flugelhorn, percussion
- Hank Jones – piano
- Eddie Gomez – bass
- Duffy Jackson – drums
