= Superbop =

Studio album by Red Rodney with Sam Noto
- Released: 1974
- Recorded: March 26, 1974
- Studio: Wally Heider Recording Studio, Los Angeles
- Genre: Jazz
- Length: 38:49
- Label: Muse; MR 5046
- Producer: Don Schlitten

Red Rodney chronology
Bird Lives! (1973)	Superbop (1974)	The Red Tornado (1975)

Superbop is an album by trumpeter Red Rodney which was recorded in 1974 and released on the Muse label.

== Reception ==
Professional ratings
Review scores
Source	Rating
AllMusic	4/5 stars

The AllMusic review by Scott Yanow stated: "this 1974 effort ... is one of his most exciting recordings of the decade. The reason is that he is matched with the fiery trumpeter Sam Noto. ... There are plenty of fireworks on this trumpet-dominated set".

== Track listing ==
1. "Superbop" (Red Rodney, Sam Noto) - 6:09
2. "The Look of Love" (Burt Bacharach, Hal David) - 4:39
3. "The Last Train Out" (Noto) - 7:34
4. "Fire" (Rodney, Noto) - 2:57
5. "Green Dolphin Street" (Bronisław Kaper, Ned Washington) - 10:28
6. "Hilton" (Jim Mulidore) - 7:02

== Personnel ==
- Red Rodney - trumpet
- Sam Noto - trumpet, flugelhorn
- Mayo Tiano - trombone
- Jimmy Mulidore - alto saxophone, soprano saxophone, alto flute
- Dolo Coker – piano
- Ray Brown – bass
- Shelly Manne – drums
