= Multimedia (album) =

Studio album by Ira Sullivan
- Released: 1982
- Recorded: December 5, 1977, and September 21, 1978
- Studio: Fantasy Studios, Berkeley, CA
- Genre: Jazz
- Label: Galaxy; GXY-5137
- Producer: Ed Michel

Ira Sullivan chronology
Peace (1979)	Multimedia (1982)	Live at the Village Vanguard (1980)

Multimedia is an album by multi-instrumentalist Ira Sullivan which was recorded in 1979 and released on the Galaxy label in 1981.

== Reception ==
Professional ratings
Review scores
Source	Rating
AllMusic	4/5 stars

The AllMusic review by Scott Yanow stated "Among the highlights of the fairly straightforward program are a swinging "Anthropology," "Painted Ladies (A Confiscated Bolero)" and "Autumn Leaves." A fine effort".

== Track listing ==
1. "Anthropology" (Charlie Parker, Dizzy Gillespie) – 7:25
2. "Multimedia" (Ira Sullivan) – 4:46
3. "Painted Ladies (A Confiscated Bolero)" (Joe Diorio, John Heard, Billy Higgins) – 9:23
4. "Autumn Leaves" (Joseph Kosma, Jacques Prévert, Johnny Mercer) – 8:19
5. "Strut" (Ira Sullivan, Kenneth Nash) – 9:28

== Personnel ==
- Ira Sullivan – flute, soprano saxophone, tenor saxophone, trumpet
- Joe Diorio – guitar (tracks 1–4)
- Monty Budwig (track 5), John Heard (tracks 1–4) – bass
- Billy Higgins – drums (tracks 1–4)
- Kenneth Nash – congas, percussion, vocals
