= Rain or Shine (Jodie Christian album) =

Studio album by Jodie Christian with Roscoe Mitchell and Art Porter
- Released: 1994
- Recorded: May 29, 1991; December 15, 1993
- Studio: Riverside Studio, Chicago
- Genre: Jazz
- Length: 1:04:35
- Label: Delmark; DE-467

Jodie Christian chronology
Experience (1992)	Rain or Shine (1994)	Blues Holiday (1994)

Rain or Shine is an album by pianist Jodie Christian. It was recorded during May 1991 and December 1993 at Riverside Studio in Chicago, and was released in 1994 by Delmark Records. On the album, Christian is joined by saxophonists Art Porter and Roscoe Mitchell, trombonist Paul McKee, bassist Larry Gray, drummers Ernie Adams, George Hughes, and Vincent Davis, and vocalist Francine Griffin.

== Reception ==
Professional ratings
Review scores
Source	Rating
AllMusic	3/5 stars
The Penguin Guide to Jazz	3/4 stars

In a review for AllMusic, Scott Yanow wrote: "Christian's versatility is displayed during this wide-ranging set and most of the selections work quite well."

The authors of The Penguin Guide to Jazz Recordings stated: "'Let's Try' is a fine opener with sterling work by McKee and Porter and the ballad medley works well." However, they disliked the tracks that feature "an unusually sour and argumentative Roscoe Mitchell," noting that they "don't fit in, no matter how nobly Christian tries to bring them round."

== Track listing ==
1. "Let's Try" (Tom McIntosh) – 6:42
2. "Song For Atala" (Roscoe Mitchell) – 8:03
3. Ballad Medley: "My Foolish Heart" (Victor Young, Ned Washington) / "Polka Dots and Moonbeams" (Jimmy Van Heusen, Johnny Burke) / "A Nightingale Sang in Berkeley Square" (Manning Sherwin, Eric Maschwitz) / "What's New?" (Bob Haggart, Johnny Burke) – 11:22
4. "Yardbird Suite" (Charlie Parker) – 3:53
5. "Coltrane's View" (Jodie Christian) – 10:06
6. "Mr. Freddie" (Roscoe Mitchell) – 5:30
7. "Chromatically Speaking" (Jodie Christian) – 6:07
8. "Come Rain or Come Shine" (Harold Arlen, Johnny Mercer) – 4:21
9. "Cherokee" (Ray Noble) – 7:59

== Personnel ==
- Jodie Christian – piano, synthesizer, vocals
- Roscoe Mitchell – alto saxophone (track 6), soprano saxophone (track 5), oboe (track 2)
- Art Porter – alto saxophone (tracks 1, 3, 5–7, 9)
- Paul McKee – trombone (tracks 1, 7, 9)
- Larry Gray – bass
- Ernie Adams – drums (tracks 1, 3, 7, 9)
- George Hughes – drums (tracks 1, 4, 8)
- Vincent Davis – drums (tracks 2, 5, 6)
- Francine Griffin – vocals (tracks 4, 8)
