= Home Free (Red Rodney album) =

Studio album by Red Rodney
- Released: 1979
- Recorded: December 19, 1977
- Studio: CI Recording Studios, New York City
- Genre: Jazz
- Label: Muse; MR 5135
- Producer: Bob Porter

Red Rodney chronology
Yard's Pad (1976)	Home Free (1979)	Red, White and Blues (1978)

Home Free is an album by trumpeter Red Rodney which was recorded in late 1977 and released on the Muse label in 1979.

== Reception ==
Professional ratings
Review scores
Source	Rating
AllMusic	4/5 stars

The AllMusic review by Scott Yanow stated "This excellent outing has a bit of a jam session feel to it ... By 1977, Rodney's chops were back in prime form, and his mastery of bebop is obvious in these recordings. Worth searching for".

== Track listing ==
1. "Starburst" (Richie Cole) – 5:40
2. "Out of Nowhere" (Johnny Green, Edward Heyman) – 6:18
3. "All the Things You Are" (Jerome Kern, Oscar Hammerstein II) – 9:18
4. "Red Rodney Rides Again" (Cole) – 5:47
5. "Helene" (Red Rodney) – 5:37
6. "Bluebird" (Charlie Parker) – 9:34

== Personnel ==
- Red Rodney – trumpet
- Richie Cole - alto saxophone
- David Schnitter – tenor saxophone
- Barry Harris – piano
- George Duvivier – bass
- Leroy Williams – drums
