= Peace (Ira Sullivan album) =

Studio album by Ira Sullivan
- Released: 1979
- Recorded: September 20–21, 1978
- Studio: Fantasy Studios, Berkeley, CA
- Genre: Jazz
- Length: 37:21
- Label: Galaxy; GXY-5114
- Producer: Ed Michel

Ira Sullivan chronology
Ira Sullivan (1977)	Peace (1979)	Multimedia (1978)

Peace is an album by multi-instrumentalist Ira Sullivan which was recorded in 1978 and released on the Galaxy label in 1981.

== Reception ==
Professional ratings
Review scores
Source	Rating
AllMusic	4/5 stars

The AllMusic review by Scott Yanow stated "The remarkable Ira Sullivan (who on this album plays trumpet, flugelhorn, flute, alto flute, soprano and tenor with equal skill) teams up with the underrated guitarist Joe Diorio, bassist John Heard, drummer Billy Higgins and percussionist Kenneth Nash for a diverse program of music".

== Track listing ==
1. "I Get a Kick Out of You" (Cole Porter) – 4:19
2. "Send in the Clowns" (Stephen Sondheim) – 7:37
3. "Gong" (Joe Diorio) – 6:01
4. "Vento Bravo" (Edu Lobo, Paulo César Pinheiro) – 10:05
5. "Peace" (Horace Silver) – 9:19

== Personnel ==
- Ira Sullivan – flute, alto flute, soprano saxophone, tenor saxophone, trumpet, flugelhorn
- Joe Diorio – guitar
- John Heard – bass
- Billy Higgins – drums
- Kenneth Nash – percussion
