= Out of Nowhere (Lee Konitz and Paul Bley album) =

Studio album by Lee Konitz and Paul Bley
- Released: February 1998
- Recorded: April 1997
- Genre: Jazz
- Length: 60:15
- Label: SteepleChase; SCCD 31427
- Producer: Nils Winther

Lee Konitz chronology
Dig Dug Dog (1997)	Out of Nowhere (1998)	RichLee! (1997)

Paul Bley chronology
Sankt Gerold (1996)	Out of Nowhere (1998)	Notes on Ornette (1997)

Out of Nowhere is an album by American jazz saxophonist Lee Konitz and pianist Paul Bley recorded in 1997 and released on the Danish SteepleChase label.

== Critical reception ==
Professional ratings
Review scores
Source	Rating
Allmusic	4/5 stars
The Penguin Guide to Jazz Recordings	4/4 stars

Scott Yanow of Allmusic said "When Konitz solos on these seven veteran standards, Bley plays fairly straightforwardly, but when it is time for the piano solos, Bley stretches himself and shows why he was considered one of the earliest free stylists. ... Konitz was always a very open improviser, so this combination works quite well". On All About Jazz, Jim Santella noted "Konitz and Bley are unique artists with a sound few can copy, who stroll easily between avant-garde and straight-ahead standards. Recommended".

== Track listing ==
1. "I'll Remember April" (Gene de Paul, Patricia Johnston, Don Raye) – 6:03
2. "Lover Man" (Jimmy Davis, Roger "Ram" Ramirez, James Sherman) – 11:03
3. "Sweet and Lovely" (Gus Arnheim, Jules LeMare, Harry Tobias) – 9:12
4. "I Can't Get Started" (Vernon Duke, Ira Gershwin) – 11:23
5. "Out of Nowhere" (Johnny Green, Edward Heyman) – 7:41
6. "Don't Blame Me" (Jimmy McHugh, Dorothy Fields) – 8:23
7. "I Want to Be Happy" (Vincent Youmans, Irving Caesar) – 6:30

== Personnel ==
- Lee Konitz – alto saxophone
- Paul Bley – piano
- Jay Anderson – bass
- Billy Drummond – drums
