= Zounds (Lee Konitz album) =

Studio album by Lee Konitz Quartet
- Released: 1991
- Recorded: May 23–24, 1990
- Studios: Magic Shop Studio, NYC
- Genre: Jazz
- Length: 54:44
- Labels: Soul Note; SN 1219
- Producer: Giovanni Bonandrini

Lee Konitz chronology
Frank-Lee Speaking (1989)	Zounds (1991)	Once Upon a Line (1990)

Zounds is an album by saxophonist Lee Konitz which was recorded in 1990 and released on the Italian Soul Note label.

== Critical reception ==
Professional ratings
Review scores
Source	Rating
AllMusic	3/5 stars
The Penguin Guide to Jazz Recordings	3.5/4 stars

The AllMusic review stated "This is a consistently stimulating and rather unpredictable outing by the talented group".

== Track listing ==
All compositions by Lee Konitz except where noted.

1. "Prologue" (Lee Konitz, Ron McClure, Bill Stewart, Kenny Werner) – 5:29
2. "Zounds" (Konitz, McClure, Stewart, Werner) – 2:33
3. "Prelude to a Kiss" (Duke Ellington, Irving Gordon, Irving Mills) – 5:19
4. "Blue Samba" – 4:19
5. "All Things Considered" – 14:38
6. "Synthesthetics" (Konitz, McClure, Stewart, Werner) – 7:29
7. "Taking a Chance on Love" (Vernon Duke, John La Touche, Ted Fetter) – 4:12
8. "Piece for My Dad" (Werner) – 4:31
9. "Soft Lee" – 6:14

== Personnel ==
- Lee Konitz – alto saxophone, soprano saxophone, vocals
- Kenny Werner – piano
- Ron McClure – bass
- Bill Stewart – drums
