= RichLee! =

Studio album by Lee Konitz and Rich Perry
- Released: 1998
- Recorded: April 1997
- Genre: Jazz
- Length: 65:18
- Label: SteepleChase SCCD 31440
- Producer: Nils Winther

Lee Konitz chronology
Out of Nowhere (1997)	RichLee! (1997)	Dialogues (1997)

Rich Perry chronology
Left Alone (1997)	RichLee! (1997)	Cancoes do Brasil (2000)

RichLee! is an album by saxophonists Lee Konitz and Rich Perry recorded in 1997 and released on the Danish SteepleChase label.

== Critical reception ==
Professional ratings
Review scores
Source	Rating
The Penguin Guide to Jazz Recordings	3.5/4 stars

In JazzTimes, Harvey Siders wrote: "RichLee! is filled with conversations that deserve maximum exposure as Konitz and Perry engage in fascinating dialogues that flow as smoothly as those between Jay and Kai, Gerry Mulligan and Chet Baker or, closer to this timbre, Konitz and Warne Marsh. Perry tones down his usual intellectual style here, probably in deference to the veteran, which puts them on the same page. They listen to each other when filling gaps and even when “talking” at the same time ... RichLee! is a great meeting of musical minds.".

== Track listing ==
1. "You Are a Weaver of Dreams" (Victor Young, Jack Elliot) – 8:47
2. "Easy Living" (Ralph Rainger, Leo Robin) – 7:56
3. "Three Little Words" (Harry Ruby, Bert Kalmar) – 9:32
4. "How Deep is the Ocean?" (Irving Berlin) – 11:54
5. "Out of Nowhere" (Johnny Green, Edward Heyman) – 3:58
6. "Moonlight in Vermont" (Karl Suessdorf, John Blackburn) – 6:59
7. "I Love You" (Cole Porter) – 7:37
8. "Half Nelson" (Miles Davis) – 8:29

== Personnel ==
- Lee Konitz – alto saxophone
- Rich Perry – tenor saxophone
- Harold Danko – piano
- Jay Anderson – bass
- Billy Drummond – drums
