= The 3R's =

Studio album by Red Rodney, Richie Cole and Ricky Ford
- Released: 1982
- Recorded: March 13–14, 1979
- Studio: Nola Recording Studios, New York City
- Genre: Jazz
- Length: 36:54
- Label: Muse; MR 5290
- Producer: Bob Porter

Red Rodney chronology
Red, White and Blues (1978)	The 3R's (1982)	Live at the Village Vanguard (1980)

The 3R's is an album by trumpeter Red Rodney with saxophonists Richie Cole and Ricky Ford which was recorded in 1979 and released on the Muse label in 1982.

== Reception ==
Professional ratings
Review scores
Source	Rating
AllMusic	4.5/5 stars

The AllMusic review by Scott Yanow stated "Excellent straight-ahead performances, with all of the musicians in fine form".

== Track listing ==
1. "The Mack Man" (Red Rodney, Gerry LaFurn) – 7:41
2. "For Heaven's Sake" (Sherman Edwards, Donald Meyer, Elise Bretton) – 4:31
3. "Dead End" (Kenny Dorham) – 6:55
4. "Waiting For Waits" (Richie Cole) – 5:55
5. "Samba de Vida" (Jack Walrath) – 7:05
6. "Blueport" (Art Farmer) – 4:49

== Personnel ==
- Red Rodney – trumpet
- Richie Cole - alto saxophone
- Ricky Ford – tenor saxophone (tracks 1, 2 & 4)
- Turk Mauro - tenor saxophone, baritone saxophone
- Roland Hanna – keyboards
- George Duvivier – bass
- Grady Tate – drums
