= Front Line (album) =

Studio album by Jodie Christian with Norris Turney
- Released: 1996
- Recorded: January 8 and 9, 1996
- Studio: Riverside Studios, Chicago
- Genre: Jazz
- Length: 1:09:04
- Label: Delmark; DE-490
- Producer: Robert G. Koester

Jodie Christian chronology
The Very Thought of You (1995)	Front Line (1996)	Soul Fountain (1998)

Front Line is an album by pianist Jodie Christian. It was recorded during January 1996 at Riverside Studios in Chicago, and was released later that year by Delmark Records. On the album, Christian is joined by saxophonists Norris Turney and Eddie Johnson, trumpeter Sonny Cohn, bassist John Whitfield, and drummers Ernie Adams and Gerryck King. Vocalist Francine Griffin also appears on one track.

== Reception ==
Professional ratings
Review scores
Source	Rating
AllMusic	4/5 stars
The Penguin Guide to Jazz	3/4 stars

In a review for AllMusic, Alex Henderson wrote: "Outside of the Windy City, Christian isn't nearly as well known as he deserves to be, but that doesn't make Front Line any less appealing."

The authors of The Penguin Guide to Jazz Recordings called the album "good fun," and described the band as "a nice group of oldtimers." They stated: "Christian acts as coach and gets the best out of the team."

Writing for JazzTimes, Owen Cordle commented: "The results are first class... The underrated and versatile Christian shows all the traits that make Chicago pianists so likable: the clean attack, the ensemble-like block chords, a basic warmth, the feeling of the church and the blues, and an infectious sense of rhythm."

== Track listing ==
1. "In a Mellow Tone" (Duke Ellington, Milt Gabler) – 8:30
2. "Willow Weep for Me" (Ann Ronell) – 7:20
3. "Lester Left Town" (Wayne Shorter) – 7:30
4. "Front Line" (Jodie Christian) – 6:45
5. "Don't Get Around Much Anymore" (Duke Ellington / Bob Russell) – 4:35
6. "Chelsea Bridge" (Billy Strayhorn) – 6:40
7. "Mood Indigo" (Barney Bigard / Duke Ellington / Irving Mills) – 6:35
8. "All Blues" (Miles Davis) – 10:03
9. "Faith" (Jodie Christian) – 2:13
10. "Splanky" (Neal Hefti) – 8:30

== Personnel ==
- Jodie Christian – piano
- Norris Turney – alto saxophone
- Eddie Johnson – tenor saxophone
- Sonny Cohn – trumpet
- John Whitfield – bass
- Ernie Adams – drums (tracks 1, 2, 4, 6–8)
- Gerryck King – drums (tracks 3, 5, 9, 10)
- Francine Griffin – vocals (track 5)
