= Reminiscing (Jodie Christian album) =

Studio album by The Jodie Christian Trio
- Released: 2001
- Recorded: July 2000
- Studio: Riverside Studio, Chicago
- Genre: Jazz
- Length: 59:16
- Label: Delmark; DE-531

Jodie Christian chronology
Soul Fountain (1998)	Reminiscing (2001)

Reminiscing is an album by pianist Jodie Christian. His last release as a leader, it was recorded during July 2000 at Riverside Studio in Chicago, and was issued in 2001 by Delmark Records. On the album, Christian is joined by bassist Dennis Carroll and drummer Tony Walton. Recorded when the pianist was nearly 70 years old, Reminiscing consists of tunes that were connected to specific memories of his childhood and career.

== Reception ==
Professional ratings
Review scores
Source	Rating
AllMusic	3/5 stars
The Penguin Guide to Jazz	3.5/4 stars

In a review for AllMusic, Alex Henderson wrote: "even though Christian... acknowledges various musicians that he admired along the way, he never goes out of his way to emulate any of them. The pianist always sounds like his own man... Reminiscing is a musical autobiography that the Chicagoan can easily be proud of."

The authors of The Penguin Guide to Jazz Recordings called the album "a delightful session," and stated that Christian "likes... to paraphrase melodies, but not so much that you can't tell what they might be, and he has a swinging team behind him."

Derek Taylor of All About Jazz described the album as "a forum to reflect on [Christian's] numerous decades in music, roaming through a program of tunes that have served as milestones in his musical road to maturity as a venerable veteran in the Chicago jazz community." He commented: "This trio disc takes its place in a discography that while comparatively slim, will remain the legacy of one of Chicago's finest jazz figures."

Writing for JazzTimes, Bill Bennett noted that "there is a wonderful clarity to Reminiscing," and called the contributions of Carroll and Walton "impeccable." He remarked: "This is a very satisfying self-portrait from a pianist who refuses to be bounded by style."

== Track listing ==
1. "How Insensitive" (Antônio Carlos Jobim, Norman Gimbel, Vinícius de Moraes) – 3:06
2. "I'll Close My Eyes" (Billy Reid, Buddy Kaye) – 9:40
3. "My Man's Gone Now" (George Gershwin, DuBose Heyward) – 8:42
4. "It's Good to Have You Near" (André Previn) – 3:19
5. "Chicago Delta Blues" (Jodie Christian) – 6:08
6. "Love Walked In" (George Gershwin, Ira Gershwin) – 7:33
7. "Embraceable You" (George Gershwin, Ira Gershwin) – 7:44
8. "You Are So Beautiful" (Billy Preston, Bruce Fisher) – 4:59
9. "Morning Star" (Rodgers Lee Grant) – 7:36

== Personnel ==
- Jodie Christian – piano
- Dennis Carroll – bass
- Anthony Walton – drums
