= Bird Lives! (Ira Sullivan album) =

Live album by Ira Sullivan and the Chicago Jazz Quintet
- Released: 1963
- Recorded: March 12, 1962
- Venue: Birdhouse, Chicago, IL
- Genre: Jazz
- Label: Vee-Jay; VJLP 3033
- Producer: Joe Segal

Ira Sullivan chronology
Blue Stroll (1959)	Bird Lives! (1963)	Horizons (1967)

Bird Lives! is a live album by multi-instrumentalist Ira Sullivan which was recorded in Chicago in 1962 and released on the Vee-Jay label on LP before being reissued as a double CD with additional material in 1993.

== Reception ==
Professional ratings
Review scores
Source	Rating
AllMusic	4/5 stars
The Penguin Guide to Jazz Recordings	3/4 stars

The AllMusic review by Scott Yanow stated "Ira Sullivan's quintet played at a Charlie Parker Memorial concert in Chicago on Mar. 12, 1962 and the results (six selections) were originally released on a single LP. The release of this double CD greatly expanded the program. ... Overall, a fine bop set".

== Track listing ==
All compositions by Charlie Parker except where noted

Disc One:

1. "Klact-Oveeseds-Tene" – 8:30
2. "In Other Words" (Bart Howard) – 6:13
3. "Shaw 'Nuff" (Ray Brown, Gil Fuller, Dizzy Gillespie) – 2:25
4. "Perhaps" – 6:04
5. "Love Letters" (Victor Young, Edward Heyman) – 5:08
6. "Mohawk" – 8:31
7. "Si Si" – 15:16 Additional track on CD reissue
8. "Be-Bop/Humpty Dumpty" (Dizzy Gillespie/Ornette Coleman) – 13:24 Additional track on CD reissue

Disc Two:

1. "Milestones" (John Lewis) – 8:14 Additional track on CD reissue
2. "Sketches" (Lewis) – 8:14 Additional track on CD reissue
3. "Omicron" (Donald Byrd) – 10:33 Additional track on CD reissue
4. "On the Alamo" (Isham Jones, Gus Kahn) – 9:58 Additional track on CD reissue
5. "Inchworm" (Frank Loesser) – 8:53 Additional track on CD reissue
6. "Back Home Blues" – 7:33 Additional track on CD reissue
7. "For You, for Me, for Evermore" (George Gershwin, Ira Gershwin) – 5:19 Additional track on CD reissue

== Personnel ==
- Ira Sullivan – trumpet, flugelhorn
- Nicky Hill – tenor saxophone
- Jodie Christian – piano
- Don Garrett – bass
- Dorell Anderson or Wilbur Campbell – drums
