= Red, White and Blues =

Studio album by Red Rodney
- Released: 1978
- Recorded: May 11 and 12, 1978
- Studios: Blue Rock Studios, New York City
- Genre: Jazz
- Length: 39:14
- Labels: Muse; MR 5111
- Producer: Dick Ables

Red Rodney chronology
Home Free (1977)	Red, White and Blues (1978)	The 3R's (1979)

Red, White and Blues is an album by trumpeter Red Rodney which was recorded in 1978 and released on the Muse label.

== Reception ==
Professional ratings
Review scores
Source	Rating
AllMusic	3/5 stars

The AllMusic review by Scott Yanow stated "the frontline is in fine form. It is surprising that the quintet mostly performs newer originals ... However, the music (which includes such colorful titles as "No Jive Line" and "Ode to a Potato Plant") is largely straight-ahead. An underrated set".

== Track listing ==
1. "It's the Samething Everywhere" (Richie Coles) – 5:04
2. "Lolita's Theme" (Bernie Senensky) – 3:49
3. "Red, White and Blues" (Robert Chudnick) – 7:22
4. "Rodney Round Robin" (Roland Hanna) – 3:23
5. "Little Red Shoes" (Charlie Parker) – 5:50
6. "Smoke Gets in Your Eyes" (Jerome Kern, Otto Harbach) – 3:29
7. "No Jive Line" (Senensky) – 4:07
8. "Ode to a Potato Plant" (Hanna) – 6:14

== Personnel ==
- Red Rodney – trumpet
- Richie Cole - alto saxophone
- Roland Hanna – piano
- Buster Williams – bass
- Eddie Gladden – drums
