= Scotch and Milk =

Studio album by Cecil Payne
- Released: 1997
- Recorded: September 2 & 3, 1996
- Studio: Riverside Studios, Chicago
- Genre: Jazz
- Length: 71:09
- Label: Delmark; DE-494
- Producer: Robert G. Koester

Cecil Payne chronology
Cerupa (1995)	Scotch and Milk (1997)	Payne's Window (1998)

Scotch and Milk is an album by the American jazz saxophonist/flautist Cecil Payne, recorded in 1996 and released by the Delmark label the following year.

== Reception ==
Professional ratings
Review scores
Source	Rating
AllMusic	4/5 stars
The Penguin Guide to Jazz Recordings	3.5/4 stars

AllMusic reviewer Alex Henderson stated: "Payne was 73 when he recorded Scotch and Milk, a fine hard bop date ... Payne's chops are in top shape on this 1996 date, and the veteran saxman plays with a lot of passion ... Nothing groundbreaking takes places on Scotch and Milk; most of the material could have been recorded for Blue Note in the 1950s or 1960s instead of 1996. Scotch and Milk is a perfect example of a veteran improviser excelling by sticking with what he does best".

== Track listing ==
All compositions by Cecil Payne, except where indicated.

1. "Scotch and Milk" – 9:04
2. "Wilhelmenia" – 8:46
3. "I'm Goin' In" – 9:57
4. "If I Should Lose You" (Ralph Rainger, Leo Robin) – 5:16
5. "Que Pasaning" – 8:09
6. "Cit Sac" – 11:18
7. "Lady Nia" – 8:13
8. "Et Vous Too, Cecil?" – 10:26

== Personnel ==
- Cecil Payne – baritone saxophone, flute
- Marcus Belgrave – trumpet
- Eric Alexander, Lin Halliday – tenor saxophone
- Harold Mabern – piano
- John Ore – bass
- Joe Farnsworth – drums
