= Nicky's Tune =

Studio album by Ira Sullivan
- Released: 1970
- Recorded: December 24, 1958
- Studio: Sound Studios, Chicago
- Genre: Jazz
- Length: 39:12 (LP); 44:03 (CD)
- Label: Delmark

Ira Sullivan chronology
Billy Taylor Introduces Ira Sullivan (1956)	Nicky's Tune (1970)	Blue Stroll (1959)

Nicky's Tune is an album by American jazz trumpeter Ira Sullivan, which was recorded in 1958 but not issued until 1970 by Delmark. He leads a quintet with saxophonist Nicky Hill, pianist Jodie Christian, bassist Victor Sproles and drummer Wilbur Campbell.

== Reception ==
Professional ratings
Review scores
Source	Rating
AllMusic	4/5 stars
The Penguin Guide to Jazz	3.5/4 stars

In his review for AllMusic, Scott Yanow states "The music (two standards and four originals) is essentially straightahead bop and generally swings quite hard."

The Penguin Guide to Jazz notes "There are atonal and polytonal episodes on Nicky's Tune" and describes his Delmark albums as "two powerful records by an almost forgotten figure."

== Track listing ==
1. "My Secret Love" (Sammy Fain, Paul Francis Webster) – 8:38
2. "When Sunny Gets Blue" (Marvin Fisher, Jack Segal) – 5:11
3. "Nicky's Tune #2" (Nicky Hill) – 7:56
4. "Nicky's Tune #3" (Nicky Hill) – 8:58
5. "Wilbur's Tune #2" (Wilbur Campbell) – 8:29

Bonus track on CD

6. "Mock and Roll Blues" – 4:51

== Personnel ==
- Ira Sullivan - trumpet
- Nicky Hill – tenor sax
- Jodie Christian – piano
- Victor Sproles – bass
- Wilbur Campbell – drums
