= Night and Day (Red Rodney album) =

1981 studio album

Studio album by Red Rodney with Ira Sullivan
- Released: 1981
- Recorded: June 15 and 16, 1981
- Studio: Nola Recording Studios, NYC
- Genre: Jazz
- Length: 35:55
- Label: Muse; MR 5274
- Producer: Bob Porter

Red Rodney chronology
| Alive in New York (1980) | Night and Day (1981) | Spirit Within (1981) |

Ira Sullivan chronology
| The Incredible Ira Sullivan (1980) | Night and Day (1981) | Ira Sullivan Does It All (1981) |

Night and Day is an album by trumpeter Red Rodney with multi-instrumentalist Ira Sullivan which was recorded and released on the Muse label in 1981.

== Reception ==
Professional ratings
Review scores
| Source | Rating |
|---|---|
| AllMusic | 4.5/5 stars |

The AllMusic review by Scott Yanow stated "The Red Rodney-Ira Sullivan Quintet was one of the finest groups of the early 1980s. Rodney had an opportunity to play fresh material; Sullivan gained more exposure than he ever had in his career; and pianist Garry Dial was given high-profile and challenging writing assignments; bassist Barry Smith and drummer Steve Bagby completed the band in mid-1981".

== Track listing ==
1. "Night and Day" (Cole Porter) - 4:10
2. "You Leave Me Breathless" (Friedrich Hollaender, Ralph Freed) – 6:30
3. "Babies" (Jeff Meyer) – 6:06
4. "Muck and Meyer" (Meyer) – 5:35
5. "Frito Mistos" (Meyer) – 5:32
6. "Dial-a-Brew" (Gary Dial) – 6:22

== Personnel ==
- Red Rodney – trumpet, flugelhorn
- Ira Sullivan - soprano saxophone, alto saxophone, trumpet
- Garry Dial – piano
- Barry Smith – bass
- Steve Bagby – drums
