= Bird Lives! =

Studio album by Red Rodney
- Released: 1973
- Recorded: July 9, 1973
- Studio: RCA Studios, New York City
- Genre: Jazz
- Length: 51:19
- Label: Muse; MR 5034
- Producer: Don Schlitten

Red Rodney chronology
Red Rodney Returns (1959)	Bird Lives! (1973)	Superbop (1974)

Bird Lives! is an album by trumpeter Red Rodney featuring performances of tunes by, or associated with, Charlie Parker which was recorded in 1973 and released on the Muse label.

== Reception ==
Professional ratings
Review scores
Source	Rating
AllMusic	4/5 stars

The AllMusic review by Scott Yanow stated "This was trumpeter Red Rodney's first jazz date as a leader in 14 years. In the interim, he had spent a lot of time playing in show bands in Las Vegas, and both his chops and his jazz abilities were a bit out of practice, but making a gradual comeback ... Although Rodney was not yet back in top form, McPherson and Harris are quite consistent, and the overall date has its share of strong moments".

== Track listing ==
All compositions by Charlie Paker except where noted

1. "Big Foot" – 5:28
2. "I'll Remember April" (Gene de Paul, Patricia Johnston, Don Raye) – 11:11
3. "Donna Lee" – 6:44
4. "Chasin' the Bird" – 9:22
5. "'Round Midnight" (Thelonious Monk, Cootie Williams, Bernie Hanighen) – 12:46
6. "52nd Street Theme" (Monk) – 5:48

== Personnel ==
- Red Rodney – trumpet
- Charles McPherson – alto saxophone
- Barry Harris – piano
- Sam Jones – bass
- Roy Brooks – drums
