= Sankt Gerold (album) =

Live album by Bley/Parker/Phillips
- Released: October 9, 2000
- Recorded: April 1996
- Venues: Propstei Sankt Gerold; Sankt Gerold, Austria
- Genre: Jazz
- Length: 67:17
- Labels: ECM; ECM 1609
- Producers: Manfred Eicher and Steve Lake

Paul Bley chronology
| Reality Check (1994) | Sankt Gerold (2000) | Out of Nowhere (1997) |

Sankt Gerold is a live album by pianist Paul Bley recorded at the Propstei Sankt Gerold in April 1996 and released on ECM in October 2000. The trio features saxophonist Evan Parker and bassist Barre Phillips.

== Reception ==
Professional ratings
Review scores
| Source | Rating |
|---|---|
| AllMusic | 4.5/5 stars |
| Tom Hull | B+ |
| The Penguin Guide to Jazz Recordings | 4/4 stars |

The AllMusic review by Thom Jurek states: "This performance is a watermark in the careers of all three participants and an essential document for the fans of any single member as well as the evolution of the improvising jazz trio."

== Track listing ==
All compositions by Paul Bley, Evan Parker & Barre Phillips except as indicated

1. "Variation 1" - 10:18
2. "Variation 2" - 7:16
3. "Variation 3" (Phillips) - 3:00
4. "Variation 4" (Parker) - 2:02
5. "Variation 5" - 6:20
6. "Variation 6" (Bley) - 3:56
7. "Variation 7" (Phillips) - 7:13
8. "Variation 8" - 8:19
9. "Variation 9" (Bley) - 7:03
10. "Variation 10" (Parker) - 5:25
11. "Variation 11" - 4:49
12. "Variation 12" (Parker) - 1:29

== Personnel ==
- Paul Bley – piano
- Evan Parker – tenor and soprano saxophones
- Barre Phillips – double bass
