= Live at the Village Vanguard (Red Rodney album) =

Live album by Red Rodney with Ira Sullivan
- Released: 1980
- Recorded: May 8–9 and July 5 & 7, 1980
- Venue: Village Vanguard, New York City, New York
- Genre: Jazz
- Length: 45:39
- Label: Muse; MR 5209
- Producer: Bob Porter

Red Rodney chronology
The 3R's (1979)	Live at the Village Vanguard (1980)	Hi Jinx at the Vanguard (1980)

Ira Sullivan chronology
Multimedia (1978)	Live at the Village Vanguard (1980)	Hi Jinx at the Vanguard (1980)

Live at the Village Vanguard is a live album by trumpeter Red Rodney with multi-instrumentalist Ira Sullivan which was recorded at the Village Vanguard and released on the Muse label in 1980.

== Reception ==
Professional ratings
Review scores
Source	Rating
AllMusic	4.5/5 stars

The AllMusic review by Scott Yanow stated "Rodney was inspired in the setting, which featured recent originals rather than bop standards ... Stimulating music". On All About Jazz, Jim Santella noted "Red Rodney’s 1980 sessions at The Village Vanguard marks the beginning of his comeback and finds the leader’s trumpet work in fine form. Two experienced horn players and a young rhythm section made for a strong program with hard bop drama and pure musical ballad sentiment ... After a long career with several disturbing setbacks, it’s nice to remember that Red Rodney succeeded in the end by passing the torch on triumphantly to the next generation".

== Track listing ==
1. "Lodgellian Mode" (Jack Walrath) – 8:54
2. "A Time for Love" (Johnny Mandel, Paul Francis Webster) – 5:46
3. "Mr. Oliver" (Jeff Meyer) – 8:40
4. "What Can We Do" (Simon Salz) – 9:50
5. "Come Home to Red" (Walrath) – 5:12
6. "Blues in the Guts" (Walrath) – 6:10

== Personnel ==
- Red Rodney – trumpet, flugelhorn
- Ira Sullivan - flute, soprano saxophone, tenor saxophone, flugelhorn
- Garry Dial – piano
- Paul Berner – bass
- Tom Whaley – drums
