= Delayed Exposure =

Studio album by Lin Halliday
- Released: 1991
- Recorded: June 25–26, 1991
- Studio: P.S. Studio, Chicago
- Genre: Jazz
- Length: 63:34
- Label: Delmark
- Producer: Robert G. Koester

Lin Halliday chronology
Delayed Exposure (1991)	East of the Sun (1992)

Delayed Exposure is the debut album by American jazz saxophonist Lin Halliday, which was recorded in 1991 and released on Delmark. He leads a quintet with trumpeter Ira Sullivan, pianist Jodie Christian, bassist Dennis Carroll and drummer George Fludas.

== Reception ==
Professional ratings
Review scores
Source	Rating
AllMusic	4/5 stars
The Penguin Guide to Jazz	3/4 stars

In his review for AllMusic, Alex Henderson states "Heartfelt performances of 'Woody'N You' and 'Serpent's Tooth' leave no doubt that Sonny Rollins is Halliday's primary influence, but also demonstrate that he's very much his own man."

The Penguin Guide to Jazz notes "Some standards and a blues give everyone a chance to hold down some choruses and, if Sullivan's trumpet turns are the most distinctive things here, Halliday acquits himself with the comfortable assurance of a veteran player."

== Track listing ==
1. "Woody 'n You" (Dizzy Gillespie) – 6:12
2. "How Deep Is the Ocean" (Irving Berlin) – 6:36
3. "Darn That Dream" (Jimmy Van Heusen, Eddie DeLange) – 9:38
4. "Dog Ear Blues" – 8:21
5. "My Romance" (Richard Rodgers, Lorenz Hart) – 7:49
6. "The Man I Love" (George Gershwin, Ira Gershwin) – 9:16
7. "Alone Together" (Arthur Schwartz, Howard Dietz) – 9:31
8. "Serpent's Tooth" (Miles Davis) – 6:11

== Personnel ==
- Lin Halliday – tenor sax
- Ira Sullivan – trumpet, flugelhorn, flute
- Jodie Christian – piano
- Dennis Carroll – bass
- George Fludas – drums
