= Ira Sullivan (1976 album) =

Studio album by Ira Sullivan
- Released: 1976
- Recorded: December 9, 12 & 13, 1975, January 30, 1976, February 2, 3 12 & 13, 1976 and March 9, 1976
- Studio: Criteria Recording Studios, Miami, FL
- Genre: Jazz
- Label: Horizon; SP-706
- Producer: John Snyder

Ira Sullivan chronology
| Horizons (1967) | Ira Sullivan (1976) | Ira Sullivan (1977) |

Ira Sullivan is an eponymous album by multi-instrumentalist Ira Sullivan which was recorded in 1975-76 and released on the Horizon label.

== Reception ==
Professional ratings
Review scores
| Source | Rating |
|---|---|
| AllMusic | 3/5 stars |

The AllMusic review by Scott Yanow stated "Ira Sullivan has long been a remarkable multi-instrumentalist with a personal sound on each of his horns. On this A&M release, Sullivan mostly sticks to soprano and flute although he plays trumpet briefly ... The generally thoughtful music is not as exciting as some of Sullivan's other sessions (particularly the later ones with Red Rodney) but has its strong moments".

== Track listing ==
1. "Old Hundreth" (Traditional) – 0:33
2. "Jitterbug Waltz" (Fats Waller) – 6:29
3. "Purples, Violets and Blues" (Ira Sullivan) – 4:43
4. "Portrait of Sal Larosa" (Dolf Castellano) – 7:34
5. "Finlandia" (Jean Sibelius) – 0:52
6. "Dove" (Carl Zittrer, Mike Smith) – 6:16
7. "Slightly Arched/Spring Can Really Hang You Up the Most" (Sullivan, Joe Diorio, Tony Castellano, Steve Bagby/Tommy Wolf, Fran Landesman) – 13:20
8. "My Reverie" (Claude Debussy, Larry Clinton) – 2:24

== Personnel ==
- Ira Sullivan – flute, soprano saxophone, tenor saxophone, trumpet, cabasa
- Joe Diorio – guitar (tracks 2, 4 & 7)
- Tony Castellano (tracks 2, 7 & 8), Alex Darqui (tracks 3 & 6) – piano
- Jaco Pastorius – bass (track 4)
- Steve Bagby – drums (tracks 4 & 7)
- Don Alias – congas (track 4)
