= Alive in New York =

Live album by Red Rodney with Ira Sullivan
- Released: 1986
- Recorded: May 8–9 and July, 1980
- Venue: Village Vanguard, NYC
- Genre: Jazz
- Length: 45:53
- Label: Muse; MR 5307
- Producer: Bob Porter

Red Rodney chronology
Hi Jinx at the Vanguard (1980)	Alive in New York (1986)	Night and Day (1981)

Ira Sullivan chronology
Hi Jinx at the Vanguard (1980)	Alive in New York (1980)	The Incredible Ira Sullivan (1980)

Alive in New York is a live album by trumpeter Red Rodney with multi-instrumentalist Ira Sullivan which was recorded at the Village Vanguard and released on the Muse label in 1986.

== Reception ==
Professional ratings
Review scores
Source	Rating
AllMusic	4.5/5 stars

The AllMusic review by Scott Yanow stated "Trumpeter Rodney, Sullivan (heard here on flute, alto and tenor), the up and coming pianist Garry Dial, bassist Paul Berner and drummer Tom Whaley all sound in inventive form as they take post-bop improvisations. This was a perfect setting for Rodney in particular, and all of the underrated band's six recordings are rewarding".

== Track listing ==
1. "Recorda-Me (Remember Me)" (Joe Henderson) – 7:45
2. "Monday's Dance" (Ira Sullivan) – 7:55
3. "Let's Cool One" (Thelonious Monk) – 6:50
4. "Red Hot and Blues" (Red Rodney) – 9:28
5. "Shutters" (Garry Dial) – 7:55

== Personnel ==
- Red Rodney – trumpet, flugelhorn
- Ira Sullivan – flute, alto saxophone, tenor saxophone
- Garry Dial – piano
- Paul Berner – bass
- Tom Whaley – drums
