= Ira Sullivan Does It All =

Studio album by Ira Sullivan
- Released: 1983
- Recorded: September 14, 1981
- Studio: Nola Recording Studios, NYC
- Genre: Jazz
- Length: 35:55
- Label: Muse; MR 5242
- Producer: Bob Porter

Ira Sullivan chronology
Night and Day (1981)	Ira Sullivan Does It All (1983)	Spirit Within (1981)

Ira Sullivan Does It All is an album by multi-instrumentalist Ira Sullivan which was recorded in 1981 and released on the Muse label in 1983.

== Reception ==
Professional ratings
Review scores
Source	Rating
AllMusic	4.5/5 stars

The AllMusic review by Scott Yanow stated "Most of the recordings by the early-'80s Red Rodney-Ira Sullivan Quintet were issued under Rodney's name, but this outing for Muse was an exception. .. this was a mighty group that consistently inspired Rodney to play music more advanced than bebop. Sullivan, who switches between soprano, alto and flugelhorn, matched well with Rodney ... Recommended".

== Track listing ==
1. "Sovereign Court" (Lou Berryman) – 3:27
2. "The More I See You" (Harry Warren, Mack Gordon) – 3:49
3. "Prelude to a Kiss" (Duke Ellington, Irving Gordon, Irving Mills) – 4:37
4. "Together" (Ray Henderson, Lew Brown, Buddy DeSylva) – 3:50
5. "Amazing Grace" (Traditional) – 3:50
6. "Central Park West" (John Coltrane) – 7:33
7. "Dolphin Dance" (Herbie Hancock) – 10:48

== Personnel ==
- Ira Sullivan - soprano saxophone, alto saxophone, flugelhorn
- Red Rodney – trumpet, flugelhorn (tracks 1, 4, 6 & 7)
- Michael Rabinowitz – bassoon (tracks 6 & 7)
- Garry Dial – piano (tracks 1–4, 6 & 7)
- Jay Anderson – bass (tracks 1, 2 & 4–7)
- Steve Bagby – drums (tracks 1, 2 & 4–7)
