= It's You (album) =

Studio album by Lee Konitz
- Released: 1996
- Recorded: March 1996
- Studio: SteepleChase Digital Studio, Copenhagen, Denmark
- Genre: Jazz
- Length: 51:34
- Label: SteepleChase; SCCD 31398
- Producer: Nils Winther

Lee Konitz chronology
Body and Soul (1995)	It's You (1996)	Strings for Holiday (1996)

It's You is an album by American jazz saxophonist Lee Konitz, recorded in Denmark in 1996 and released on the Danish SteepleChase label.

== Critical reception ==
Professional ratings
Review scores
Source	Rating
AllMusic	4/5 stars
The Penguin Guide to Jazz Recordings	3/4 stars

Scott Yanow of AllMusic wrote: "The focus is mostly on Konitz, and he is in top form, playing inventively and thoughtfully ... This is a melodic and cool-toned bop session that finds Lee Konitz often sounding as if he is thinking aloud".

== Track listing ==
All compositions by Lee Konitz except where noted

1. "Thingin'" – 9:47
2. "Angel Eyes" (Matt Dennis, Earl Brent) – 8:14
3. "Boo Doo" – 6:35
4. "It's You" – 9:55
5. "Mella" – 8:48
6. "April in Nimes" (Ron McClure) – 8:11

== Personnel ==
- Lee Konitz – alto saxophone
- Ron McClure – bass
- Billy Hart – drums
