= Hi Jinx at the Vanguard =

Live album by Red Rodney with Ira Sullivan
- Released: 1984
- Recorded: May 8–9 and July 5, 1980
- Venue: Village Vanguard, NYC
- Genre: Jazz
- Length: 42:10
- Label: Muse; MR 5276
- Producer: Bob Porter

Red Rodney chronology
Live at the Village Vanguard (1980)	Hi Jinx at the Vanguard (1984)	Alive in New York (1980)

Hi Jinx at the Vanguard is a live album by trumpeter Red Rodney with multi-instrumentalist Ira Sullivan which was recorded at the Village Vanguard and released on the Muse label in 1984.

== Reception ==
Professional ratings
Review scores
Source	Rating
AllMusic	4/5 stars

The AllMusic review by Scott Yanow stated "The modern setting (which still had a jam session feel since the band had only been playing together a week before appearing at the Vanguard) brought out the best in these talented musicians".

== Track listing ==
1. "Hi Jinx" (Jack Walrath) – 7:28
2. "On the Seventh Day" (Walrath) – 5:00
3. "Days of Wine and Roses" (Henry Mancini, Johnny Mercer) – 8:44
4. "I Remember You" (Victor Schertzinger, Mercer) – 7:20
5. "I Got It Bad (and That Ain't Good)" (Duke Ellington, Paul Francis Webster) – 8:18
6. "Let's Cool One" (Thelonious Monk) – 5:20

== Personnel ==
- Red Rodney – trumpet, flugelhorn
- Ira Sullivan - flute, soprano saxophone, tenor saxophone, flugelhorn
- Garry Dial – piano
- Paul Berner – bass
- Tom Whaley – drums
