= The New York Album =

Studio album by Lee Konitz Quartet
- Released: 1988
- Recorded: August 18–19, 1987
- Studios: Sound Ideas Studios, NYC
- Genre: Jazz
- Length: 46:15
- Labels: Soul Note; SN 1169
- Producer: Giovanni Bonandrini

Lee Konitz chronology
Ideal Scene (1986)	The New York Album (1988)	Lee Konitz in Rio (1988)

The New York Album is an album by saxophonist Lee Konitz's Quartet which was recorded in 1987 and released on the Italian Soul Note label. The album marked Konitz's 70th album release and his 39th Studio album.

== Critical reception ==
Professional ratings
Review scores
Source	Rating
Allmusic	4/5 stars
The Penguin Guide to Jazz Recordings	3/4 stars

The Allmusic review stated "For this lovely and swinging date from 1988, Konitz conjures up a fresh array of solo moods on a mix of self-penned material, contemporary originals, and standards. Backed by a stellar band made up of bassist Marc Johnson, pianist Harold Danko, and drummer Adam Nussbaum, Konitz pleasantly surprises with his mercurial phrases, varied tonal palette, and unique rhythmic sense ... A very enjoyable collection".

== Track listing ==
All compositions by Lee Konitz except where noted.

1. "Candlelight Shadows" (Harold Danko) – 9:34
2. "Everybody's Song But My Own" (Kenny Wheeler) – 7:23
3. "Limehouse Blues" (Philip Braham, Douglas Furber) – 5:22
4. "Monkian Round" – 3:24
5. "September Waltz" (Frank Wunsch) – 7:01
6. "Dream Variation" – 4:35
7. "Invitation" (Bronisław Kaper, Paul Francis Webster) – 8:56

== Personnel ==
- Lee Konitz – alto saxophone
- Harold Danko – piano
- Marc Johnson – bass
- Adam Nussbaum – drums
