= Experience (Jodie Christian album) =

Studio album by Jodie Christian
- Released: 1992
- Recorded: May 1991; February 1992
- Genre: Jazz
- Length: 59:05
- Label: Delmark; DD-454

Jodie Christian chronology
Experience (1992)	Rain or Shine (1994)

Experience is the debut album by pianist Jodie Christian, released in 1992 by Delmark Records. It features six solo piano tracks, plus four on which Christian is joined by bassist Larry Gray and drummer Vincent Davis.

== Reception ==
Professional ratings
Review scores
Source	Rating
AllMusic	4/5 stars
The Penguin Guide to Jazz	3.5/4 stars

John Litweiler of the Chicago Reader commented: "Christian's bop melodies, with bubbling vitality and attendant subtle harmonies and without distracting flourishes or the idiom's typical nervous qualities, are lyric music with a crystal touch."

In a review for AllMusic, Scott Yanow described Christian as "a flexible pianist able to play anything from bebop to fairly free jazz," and wrote: "Christian mostly sticks to the modern mainstream and he sounds quite fine throughout this largely melodic set." The authors of The Penguin Guide to Jazz Recordings stated: "Christian's decisive touch and complex but clear voicings bespeak a talent that has absorbed everything it needs from the tradition. Gray and Davis help out assiduously."

== Track listing ==
1. "Bluesing Around" (Jodie Christian) – 7:49
2. "Mood Indigo" (Barney Bigard / Duke Ellington / Irving Mills) – 6:15
3. "Faith" (Jodie Christian) – 4:33
4. "The End of a Love Affair" (Edward Redding) – 7:25
5. "They Can't Take That Away from Me" (George Gershwin / Ira Gershwin) – 4:45
6. "If I Could Let You Go" (Jodie Christian) – 2:40
7. "Reminiscing" (Jodie Christian) – 8:42
8. "Blues Holiday" (Jodie Christian) – 4:00
9. "All the Things You Are" (Oscar Hammerstein II/Jerome Kern) – 6:27
10. "Goodbye" (Gordon Jacob) – 6:33

== Personnel ==
- Jodie Christian – piano
- Larry Gray – bass (tracks 4, 6, 8, 9)
- Vincent Davis – drums (tracks 4, 6, 8, 9)
