= Ideal Scene =

Studio album by Lee Konitz
- Released: 1986
- Recorded: July 22 and 23, 1986
- Genres: Cool jazz, post-bop
- Length: 45:08
- Label: Soul Note
- Producer: Giovanni Bonandrini

Lee Konitz chronology
Medium Rare (1986)	Ideal Scene (1986)	The New York Album (1987)

Professional ratings
Review scores
Source	Rating
Allmusic	4/5 stars
The Penguin Guide to Jazz Recordings	3/4 stars

Ideal Scene is an album by the American jazz saxophonist Lee Konitz and his Quartet recorded in 1986, and released on the Italian Soul Note label.

== Critical reception ==
The AllMusic review by Scott Yanow states, "The subtle but swinging music is harmonically advanced and full of surprising twists; no predictable bebop here. More than most members of his musical generation, Lee Konitz has continued to keep his music and improvising style fresh and enthusiastic while retaining his own original musical personality through the years".

== Track listing ==
1. "Chick Came Around" (Lee Konitz) – 6:13
2. "Tidal Breeze" (Harold Danko) – 7:50
3. "Silly Samba " (Harold Danko) – 6:30
4. "Ezz-Thetic" (George Russell) – 4:35
5. "If You Could See Me Now" (Tadd Dameron) – 7:30
6. "Stare-Case" (Harold Danko) – 3:06
7. "Stella by Starlight" (Victor Young, Ned Washington) – 9:24
- Recorded July 22 and 23, 1986; mixed July 28, 1986 at Barigozzi Studio, Milano.

== Personnel ==
- Lee Konitz – alto saxophone, Liner Notes
- Harold Danko – piano
- Rufus Reid – bass
- Al Harewood – drums
