= Ira Sullivan (1978 album) =

Studio album by Ira Sullivan
- Released: 1978
- Recorded: October 11 & 20, 1977
- Studio: Streeterville Studios, Chicago, IL
- Genre: Jazz
- Label: Flying Fish; FF-075
- Producer: Chuck Nessa

Ira Sullivan chronology
| Ira Sullivan (1977) | Ira Sullivan (1978) | Peace (1978) |

Ira Sullivan is an album by multi-instrumentalist Ira Sullivan which was recorded in 1977 and released on the Flying Fish label.

== Reception ==
Professional ratings
Review scores
| Source | Rating |
|---|---|
| AllMusic | 4/5 stars |
| DownBeat | 4.5/5 stars |

The AllMusic review by Scott Yanow stated "The talented multi-instrumentalist Ira Sullivan made a rare return to Chicago for this set, ... Switching between trumpet, flugelhorn, soprano and flute, Sullivan performs a couple of originals and four standards ... This is a more straight-ahead than usual program of music by the adventurous improviser".

DownBeat gave the album 4.5 stars. Reviewer Jack Sohmer wrote, "This is exceedingly accessible contemporary jazz that Sullivan plays, and it is music that accomplishes its purposes without benefit of the fusion cliches elsewhere so abundant".

== Track listing ==
1. "The Girl from Ipanema" (Antônio Carlos Jobim, Vinícius de Moraes, Norman Gimbel) – 8:45
2. "Monday's Dance" (Ira Sullivan) – 6:04
3. "Circumstantial" (Simon Salz) – 9:44
4. "Stranger in Paradise" (Robert Wright, George Forrest, Alexander Borodin) – 8:30
5. "Angel Eyes" (Matt Dennis, Earl Brent) – 8:07
6. "That's Earl, Brother" (Dizzy Gillespie) – 8:04

== Personnel ==
- Ira Sullivan – flute, soprano saxophone, trumpet, flugelhorn
- Jodie Christian – piano
- Simon Salz – guitar
- Dan Shapera– bass
- Wilbur Campbell – drums
