= The Red Tornado (album) =

Studio album by Red Rodney
- Released: 1976
- Recorded: September 30 and October 2, 1975
- Studio: Bell Sound (New York City)
- Genre: Jazz
- Length: 39:07
- Label: Muse; MR 5088
- Producer: Bob Porter

Red Rodney chronology
Superbop (1974)	The Red Tornado (1976)	Yard's Pad (1976)

The Red Tornado is an album by trumpeter Red Rodney which was recorded at New York City's Bell Sound Studios in 1975 and released on the Muse label.

== Reception ==
Professional ratings
Review scores
Source	Rating
AllMusic	4/5 stars

The AllMusic review by Scott Yanow stated "Red Rodney's string of Muse recordings in the 1970s found the trumpeter getting stronger album by album. For this date, he plays in the hard bop genre ... most of the tunes are based either on blues or on earlier songs (including "originals" close to "So What" and "Cherokee"). Rodney sounds strong".

== Track listing ==
All compositions by Red Rodney except where noted.

1. "For Dizzy" (George Young) - 5:40
2. "I Can't Get Started" (Vernon Duke, Ira Gershwin) - 5:15
3. "Red Bird" - 8:50
4. "The Red Tornado" - 8:12
5. "Nos Duis Ga Tarde" (M. Albonese, U. Yoeta) - 5:10
6. "The Red Blues" - 6:00

== Personnel ==
- Red Rodney – trumpet
- Bill Watrous – trombone
- George Young - tenor saxophone, flute
- Roland Hanna – piano, electric piano
- Sam Jones – bass
- Billy Higgins – drums
