= Alexander Sipiagin =

Russian Roman Catholic priest (1875–1941)

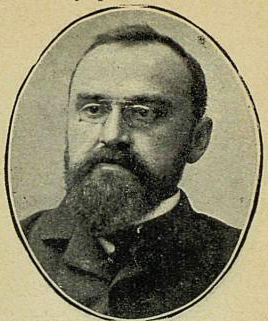
Alexander Sipiagin

Archpriest Alexander Sipiagin (Russian: Алекса́ндр Григо́рьевич Сипя́гин; August 17, 1875 – January 16, 1941) was a politician, a priest of the Catholic Church and a member of Russian apostolate.

== Biography ==
Sipiagin was born into a noble family in Tbilisi. His father was in the military and his uncle was the Interior Minister Dmitry Sipyagin. In 1894 he entered the University of Kharkov, then studied geology at the University of Vienna. Sipiagin after taught at Sevastopol and Kharkiv. In 1906 the Constitutional Democratic Party elected him deputy of the 1906 Russian legislative election. The sudden death of the wife nullifies the previous plans, Sipiagin converted to Catholicism from Russian Orthodoxy and in 1909 became a priest. Influenced his choice acquaintance with Bishop Eduard von der Ropp, who instructed Sipyagin to teach at Roman Catholic seminary in Saratov. At the beginning of the Russian Civil War, he was sent to Constantinople, where he establishes contact with the International Red Cross and deals with the fate of Russian prisoners. Then Sipyagin worked at Saint George Boarding for Russian children. In 1924 received the title of Monsignor. From 1929 he worked at the Commission on the establishment of the Code of Canon Law of the Eastern Churches, taught in " Russicum "in publishing and research activities in the monastery of Grottaferrata. Sipyagin published his articles in the Catholic periodical: " Faith and Life "," Faith and the Church, "" To the compound: Russian Catholic magazine, "" Faith and Fatherland "," Ringing of church bells and the magazine " Kitezh (magazine). " Sipiagin was not only a talented journalist, but as a researcher and systematizer of Catholic publications in Russian. In 1935 in Harbin went up by it "Catalogue of Catholic literature in Russian." Sipiagin donated to the Russicumlibrary about 200 books.

From 1930 he taught at the missionary Institute at the John Paul II Catholic University of Lublin, Poland. In October 1933 Sipyagin participated in Rome in a meeting of Russian Catholic clergy.

== Death ==
Alexander Sipyagin died in Rome and was buried at the Campo Verano cemetery.
