= Soft Hands (album) =

Studio album by Ron McClure
- Released: February 6, 2007
- Genre: Jazz
- Length: 65:21
- Label: SteepleChase

Ron McClure chronology
Jam Session, Vol. 16 (2005)	Soft Hands (2007)	New Moon (2009)

Soft Hands is a 2007 jazz album featuring trio led by bassist Ron McClure and also featuring tenor saxophonist Rich Perry and multi-instrumentalist George Colligan, here playing piano.

The album features eight mid-tempo tracks and ballads penned by McClure. Released on SteepleChase (SCCD 31615), the album is being distributed by Discovery.

== Reception ==
Professional ratings
Review scores
Source	Rating
The Penguin Guide to Jazz Recordings	4/4 stars

The album is listed as one of the "Core Collection" albums in The Penguin Guide to Jazz Recordings. In the later The Penguin Jazz Guide the authors reflected "These eight tunes are the work of a mature and assured composer and the drummer less format keeps the tempos open enough to allow at least some of the songs to change direction internally"

JazzTimes singled out the title track, "Fortune Gardens", "I Never Knew" and "Gates of Saffron" as particularly notable, commenting that with these songs "the trio achieves a collective weaving of lines that is memorable, each player feeding off the ideas of the others", lifting it into the realm of "music of the contemplative."

== Track listing ==
All tracks written by Ron McClure

1. "Life Took Over" – 7:58
2. "Altered Bells" – 7:33
3. "May Day" – 7:10
4. "Fortune Gardens" – 8:28
5. "I Never Knew" – 6:54
6. "Soft Hands" – 7:08
7. "Gates of Saffron" – 8:52
8. "Marble Room" – 11:18

== Personnel ==
- George Colligan – Piano
- Ron McClure – Bass, liner Notes
- Rich Perry – Sax (tenor)
- Jon Rosenberg – Audio engineer
- Nils Winther – Photography
