= Rich Perry =

American jazz saxophonist

- Born: July 22, 1955 (age 71); Cleveland, Ohio, U.S.
- Genres: Jazz
- Occupation: Musician
- Instrument: Saxophone
- Label: SteepleChase
- Member of: Vanguard Jazz Orchestra
- Website: www.richperrymusic.com

Rich Perry is an American jazz tenor saxophonist from Cleveland, Ohio.

Perry attended Bowling Green State University for a year before moving to New York. He toured with the Glenn Miller Orchestra in 1975 and with The Thad Jones/Mel Lewis Orchestra the following year. He has also played with Chet Baker, Paul Bley, Machito, Bob Moses, Jack McDuff, Billy Hart, Eddie Gómez, Tom Harrell, and Harold Danko. He has recorded as a leader since 1993 on SteepleChase Records.

Perry is currently a member of the Vanguard Jazz Orchestra as well as the Maria Schneider Orchestra. He is an adjunct faculty member of the William Paterson University jazz program.

== Discography ==
=== As leader or co-leader ===
- To Start Again (SteepleChase, 1993)
- Beautiful Love (SteepleChase, 1994)
- What Is This? (SteepleChase, 1995)
- Left Alone (SteepleChase, 1997)
- RichLee! (SteepleChase, 1997) – with Lee Konitz
- Canções do Brasil (SteepleChase, 2000)
- So in Love (SteepleChase, 2000)
- Doxy (SteepleChase, 2000)
- O Grand Amor (SteepleChase, 2001)
- Hearsay (SteepleChase, 2002)
- At Eastman (SteepleChase, 2003)
- East of the Sun and West of 2nd Avenue (SteepleChase, 2004)
- You're My Everything (SteepleChase, 2005)
- Rhapsody (SteepleChase, 2006)
- At the Kitano, Vol. 1 (SteepleChase, 2006)
- E-Motion (SteepleChase, 2007)
- At the Kitano, Vol. 2 (SteepleChase, 2008)
- Gone (SteepleChase, 2010)
- At the Kitano, Vol. 3 (SteepleChase, 2010)
- Grace (SteepleChase, 2011)
- Time Was (SteepleChase, 2010)
- Nocturne (SteepleChase, 2014)
- Organique (SteepleChase, 2015)
- Mood (SteepleChase, 2016)
- Other Matters (SteepleChase, 2019)
- Happy Destiny (SteepleChase, 2021)
- Everything Happens (SteepleChase, 2022)
- Progression (SteepleChase, 2023)
- Dream (SteepleChase, 2025)

=== As sideman ===
- Paul Bley Speechless – with Victor Lewis
- Sila Cevikce A New Abode
- John Fedchock New York Big Band Up and Running, No Nonsense, On the Edge
- Christian Finger Merge into Beauty
- Artt Frank Waltz for Sharon Stone (mja Records, 1997)
- Joe Henderson The Joe Henderson Big Band
- Fred Hersch Songs Without Words, Point in Time, Forward Motion
- Aaron Irwin Into the Light
- Clay Jenkins Matters of Time
- Steve Lampert Venus Perplexed, Music from There
- Andy LaVerne Pianissimo
- Pete Malinverni Invisible Cities
- Ron McClure Soft Hands, Dream Team, Double Triangle – with Tim Hagans, Mark Copeland, Billy Hart
- George Mraz Bottom Lines, Mraz Jazz – with Cyrus Chestnut, Al Foster
- Jeanfrançois Prins El Gaucho – with Victor Lewis
- Rufus Reid The Gait Keeper, Live at the Kennedy Center
- Renee Rosnes Manhattan Rain
- Dave Scott Song for Amy, Naivete, Nonchalant
- Dave Stryker Blue to the Bone, Big Room
- Vanguard Jazz Orchestra Up from the Skies, The Way, Can I Persuade You, Lickety Split, The Thad Jones Legacy
- Gary Versace Time and Again
