= Lin Halliday =

American jazz musician

Lin Halliday (June 16, 1936 – January 25, 2000) was an American saxophonist.

He was born in De Queen, Arkansas and was raised in Little Rock, where he played the saxophone and clarinet in school. After he moved to Los Angeles in his teens to begin playing professionally, he began performing with saxophonist Joe Maini. Halliday moved to New York City in 1958, Nashville in 1966, and Chicago in 1980. His style was influenced by the musical cultures of these cities.

Halliday made his debut album, Delayed Exposure, with the Chicago jazz label Delmark Records in 1991. His following albums, East of the Sun (1991) and Where or When (1993) with saxophonist Ira Sullivan were well received by the Chicago jazz community.

Halliday became a "staple attraction" at many Chicago jazz clubs including the Green Mill, the Bop Shop, Joe Segal's Jazz Showcase, and the Get Me High Lounge. His performance on trumpeter Brad Goode's album Shock of the New (1998) won him much admiration on the Chicago jazz scene. Halliday was also featured on the album Stablemates (1995) with Chicago saxophonist Eric Alexander.

== Discography ==
- Airegin (Delmark, 2000; recorded in 1988)
- Delayed Exposure (Delmark, 1991)
- East of the Sun (Delmark, 1992)
- Where or When (Delmark, 1994)
- Stablemates (Delmark, 1996) with Eric Alexander

With Cecil Payne

- Scotch and Milk (Delmark, 1997)
