= Red Rodney =

American jazz trumpeter (1927–1994)

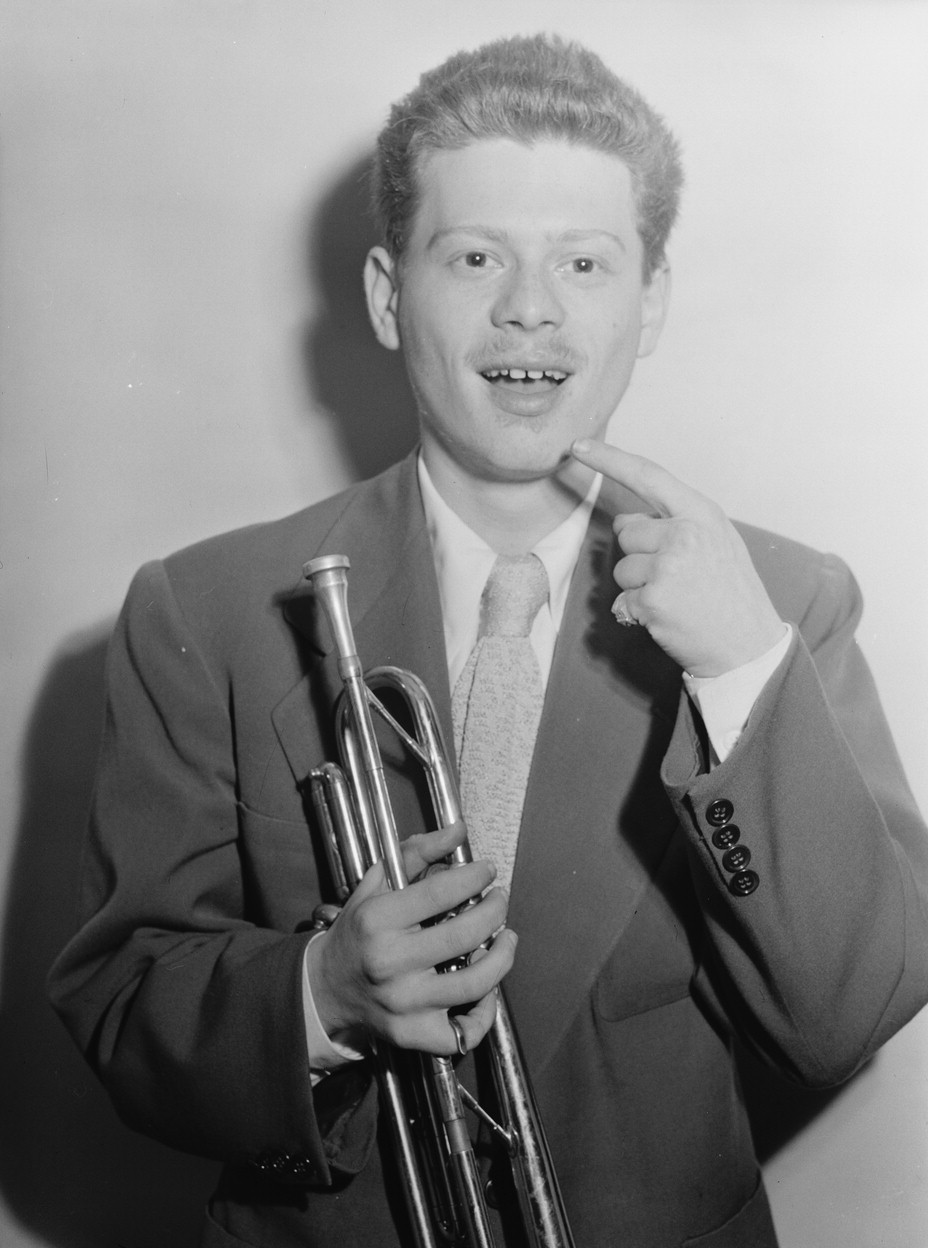
- Red Rodney, c. June 1946

Background information
- Born: Robert Chudnick; September 27, 1927; Philadelphia, Pennsylvania, U.S.
- Died: May 27, 1994 (aged 66) Boynton Beach, Florida, U.S.
- Genres: Jazz
- Occupation: Musician
- Instrument: Trumpet
- Years active: 1942–1994
- Labels: Savoy, Fantasy, Muse, Sonet, Steeplechase, Chesky

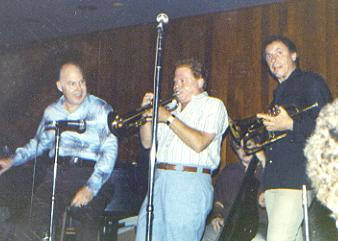
Rich Matteson, Red Rodney, and Ira Sullivan at the Village Jazz Lounge in Walt Disney World; photo: Laura Kolb

Robert Roland Chudnick (September 27, 1927 – May 27, 1994), known professionally as Red Rodney, was an American jazz trumpeter.

== Biography ==
Born in Philadelphia, Pennsylvania, he became a professional musician at 15, working in the mid-1940s for the big bands of Jerry Wald, Jimmy Dorsey, Georgie Auld, Elliot Lawrence, Benny Goodman, and Les Brown. He was inspired by hearing Dizzy Gillespie and Charlie Parker to change his style to bebop, moving on to play with Claude Thornhill, Gene Krupa, and Woody Herman. He was Jewish.

He accepted an invitation from Charlie Parker to join his quintet and was a member of the band from 1949 to 1951. Being the only white member of the group, when playing in the southern United States he was billed as "Albino Red" as a ruse to avoid prejudice against mixed race musical combos. During this time he recorded extensively.

During the 1950s, he worked as a bandleader in Philadelphia and recorded with Ira Sullivan. He became addicted to heroin and started a pattern of dropping in and out of jazz. At one point, he disguised himself as an US Army disbursement officer, General Arnold T. MacIntyre, whose appearance was similar to his own. In this guise, he robbed the Atomic Energy Commission of some $10,000; he was later caught and served prison time.

During 1969, Rodney played in Las Vegas with fellow Woody Herman colleague, trombonist Bill Harris, as part of the Flamingo casino house band led by Russ Black. Similar work continued through 1972.

In the early 1970s he was bankrupted by medical costs following a stroke. He returned to jazz. In 1975 he was incarcerated in Lexington, Kentucky for drug offenses. While jailed he gave music lessons to guitarist Wayne Kramer of the MC5.

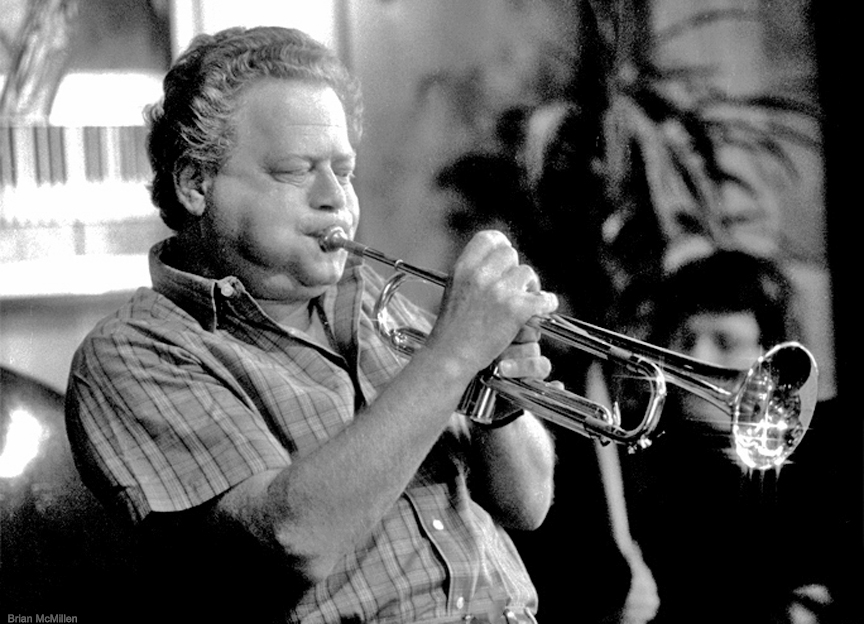
Red Rodney at Bach Dancing & Dynamite Society, Half Moon Bay CA 1982

He reunited with Ira Sullivan and performed with Dizzy Gillespie. From 1980 to 1982, Rodney made five albums with Sullivan. On these albums he started to play post bop jazz. He continued to work and record into the 1990s. He performed on a Charlie Parker tribute album by Charlie Watts, drummer for the Rolling Stones. He provided an early showcase for saxophonist Chris Potter, who was a member of his group and only 19 years old when Rodney recorded Red Alert in late 1990.

He performed at Jazz at Lincoln Center and the JVC Jazz Festival. He worked as an adviser for Bird, a movie about Charlie Parker directed by Clint Eastwood. Michael Zelniker played him in the movie.

Rodney died on May 27, 1994, from lung cancer.

== Discography ==
=== As leader ===
- Modern Music from Chicago (Fantasy, 1956)
- Red Rodney: 1957 (Savoy, 1957)
- Red Rodney Returns (Argo, 1959)
- Broadway (Status, 1965)
- Bird Lives! (Muse, 1974)
- Superbop (Muse, 1974)
- Red Rodney with the Bebop Preservation Society (Spotlite, 1975)
- The Red Tornado (Muse, 1976)
- Yard's Pad (Sonet, 1976)
- Red, White and Blues (Muse, 1978)
- Home Free (Muse, 1979)
- Live at the Village Vanguard (Muse, 1980)
- Night and Day (Muse, 1981)
- Spirit Within with Ira Sullivan (Elektra Musician, 1982)
- The 3R's Richie Cole and Ricky Ford (Muse, 1982)
- Sprint (Elektra Musician, 1983)
- Hi Jinx at the Vanguard (Muse, 1984)
- Social Call with Charlie Rouse (Uptown, 1984)
- Alive in New York (Muse, 1986)
- Red Giant (SteepleChase, 1988)
- Red Snapper (SteepleChase, 1988)
- Red Giant (SteepleChase, 1988)
- No Turn on Red (Denon, 1989)
- Code Red (Continuum, 1989)
- Then and Now (Chesky, 1992)

=== As sideman ===
- Dizzy Gillespie, To Diz with Love (Telarc, 1992)
- Woody Herman, The Fourth Herd (Jazzland, 1960)
- Clifford Jordan, Dr. Chicago (Bee Hive, 1985)
- Lee Konitz, Live at Laren (Soul Note, 1984)
- Gene Krupa, Gene Krupa's Sidekicks (Columbia, 1955)
- Elliot Lawrence, The Uncollected Elliot Lawrence and His Orchestra 1946 (Hindsight, 1982)
- Charlie Parker, Bird at St. Nick's (Jazz Workshop, 1957)
- Charlie Parker, Swedish Schnapps (Verve, 1958)
- Ali Ryerson, Blue Flute (Red Baron, 1992)
- Ira Sullivan, Ira Sullivan Does It All (Muse, 1983)
- Bob Thiele, Louis Satchmo (Red Baron, 1992)
- Claude Thornhill, The Uncollected Claude Thornhill and His Orchestra (Hindsight, 1977)

== Sources ==
- Fresh Air on WHYY, December 30, 2002
- Morton, Richard and Cook, Brian. The Penguin Guide to Jazz, New Edition, London, Penguin, 1994
- Morton, Richard and Cook, Brian. The Penguin Guide to Jazz on CD, sixth Edition, London, Penguin, 2002, ISBN 0140515216
