= Ira Sullivan =

American jazz musician (1931–2020)

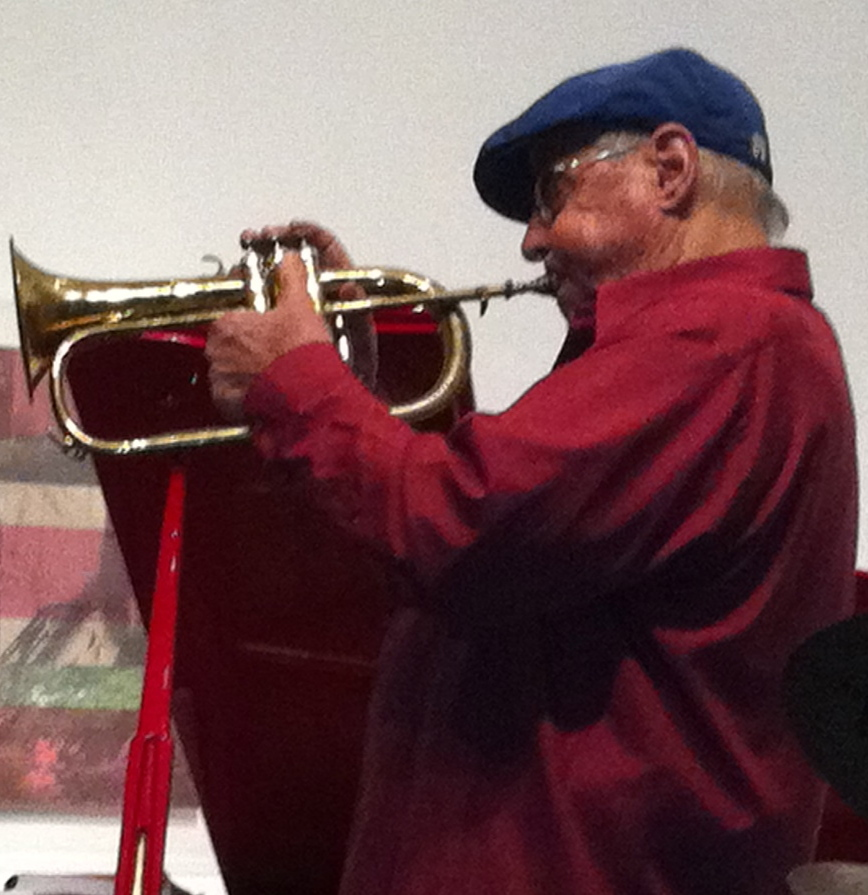
- Sullivan in 2011

Background information
- Born: May 1, 1931; Washington, D.C., U.S.
- Died: September 21, 2020 (aged 89) Miami, Florida, U.S.
- Genre: Jazz
- Occupations: Musician, composer
- Instruments: Trumpet, flugelhorn, flute, saxophone

Ira Sullivan (May 1, 1931 – September 21, 2020) was an American jazz trumpeter, flugelhornist, flautist, saxophonist, and composer born in Washington, D.C., United States. An active musician since the 1950s, he often worked with Red Rodney and Lin Halliday.

== Biography ==
Sullivan was born May 1, 1931, in Washington, D.C. His father taught him to play the trumpet beginning at age 3 1/2, and his mother taught him saxophone. He played in 1950s Chicago with such musicians as Charlie Parker, Lester Young, Wardell Gray and Roy Eldridge, gaining a reputation as a fearsome bebop soloist. After playing briefly with Art Blakey in 1956, and mastering alto and baritone saxophone, Sullivan moved south to Florida and out of the spotlight in the early 1960s.

His reluctance to travel limited his opportunities to play with musicians of the first rank, but Sullivan continued to play in the Miami area, often in schools and churches. Contact with local younger players such as Jaco Pastorius and Pat Metheny led to teaching and to a broadening of his own musical roots to include the stylings of John Coltrane's jazz.

With the addition of flute and soprano saxophone to his performing range, Sullivan moved to New York, and in 1980 formed a quintet with bop trumpeter Red Rodney. Sullivan and Rodney worked on new material and fostered young talent.

Sullivan and his longtime friend and collaborator Stu Katz, jazz pianist and vibraphonist, co-led a multi-night performance with Katz at Joe Segal's The Jazz Showcase in Chicago. A live recording of some of those performances, A Family Affair: Live At Joe Segal's Jazz Showcase, was released in 2011.

Sullivan taught at the Young Musicians Camp each summer at the University of Miami.

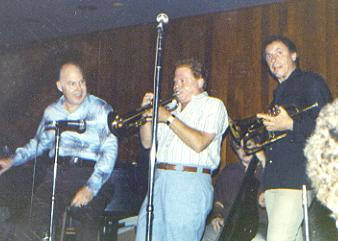
Rich Matteson, Red Rodney, and Ira Sullivan at the Village Jazz Lounge in Walt Disney World

Ira Sullivan died September 21, 2020, of metastatic pancreatic cancer in his Miami home at age 89.

Ira Sullivan's musical signature was "Amazing Grace", the tune with which he closed every performance for decades. In the week following Sullivan's death, the jazz community produced a Love Letter to Ira Sullivan, a compilation of more than 40 performances of "Amazing Grace".

== Discography ==
=== As leader ===
- Blue Stroll (Delmark, 1961)
- Bird Lives! (Vee-Jay, 1963)
- Horizons (Atlantic, 1967)
- Nicky's Tune (Delmark, 1970)
- Ira Sullivan (Horizon, 1976)
- Ira Sullivan (Flying Fish, 1978)
- Peace (Galaxy, 1978)
- The Incredible Ira Sullivan (Stash, 1980)
- Multimedia (Galaxy, 1982)
- Ira Sullivan Does It All (Muse, 1983)
- Strings Attached (Pausa, 1983)
- The Breeze and I with Joe Diorio (Ram, 1994)
- After Hours (Go Jazz, 2000)
- A Family Affair with Stu Katz (Origin, 2011)

=== As sideman ===
With Art Blakey

- Originally (Columbia, 1956 [1982])

With Frank Catalano

- Cut It Out (Delmark, 1997)

With Red Garland

- Red Alert (Galaxy, 1977)

With Lin Halliday

- Delayed Exposure (Delmark, 1991)
- East of the Sun (Delmark, 1992)

With Eddie Harris

- Come on Down (Atlantic, 1970)

With Philly Joe Jones

- Philly Mignon (Galaxy, 1977)

With Roland Kirk

- Introducing Roland Kirk (Argo, 1960)

With Roberto Magris

- Sun Stone - Roberto Magris Sextet feat. Ira Sullivan (JMood Records, 2019)

With J. R. Monterose

- J. R. Monterose (Blue Note, 1956)

With Rita Reys

- The Cool Voice of Rita Reys (Columbia, 1956)

With Red Rodney

- Live at the Village Vanguard (Muse, 1980)
- Hi Jinx at the Vanguard (Muse, 1980 [1984])
- Alive in New York (Muse, 1980 [1986])
- Night and Day (Muse, 1981)
- Spirit Within (Musician,1982)

With Billy Taylor

- The Billy Taylor Trio Introduces Ira Sullivan (ABC-Paramount, 1956)

With Brad Goode

- Toy Trumpet (SteepleChase, 2000)
