= Canonbury Square =

Garden square in Islington, London, England

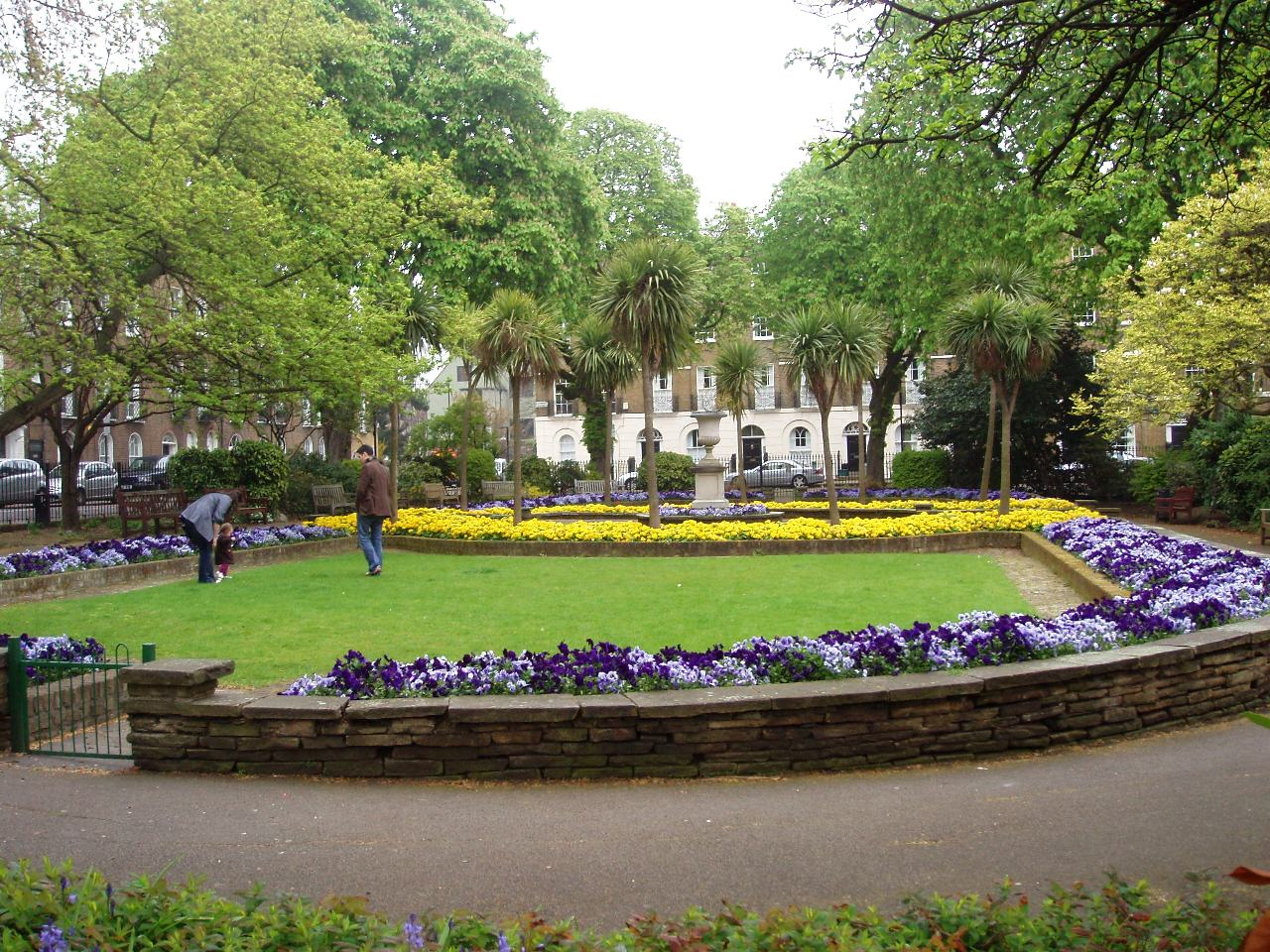
- Canonbury Square, east side

- Location within London Borough of Islington
- Postal code: N1
- Coordinates: 51.543575°N 0.100492°W

Construction
- Construction start: 1805
- Completion: by 1830

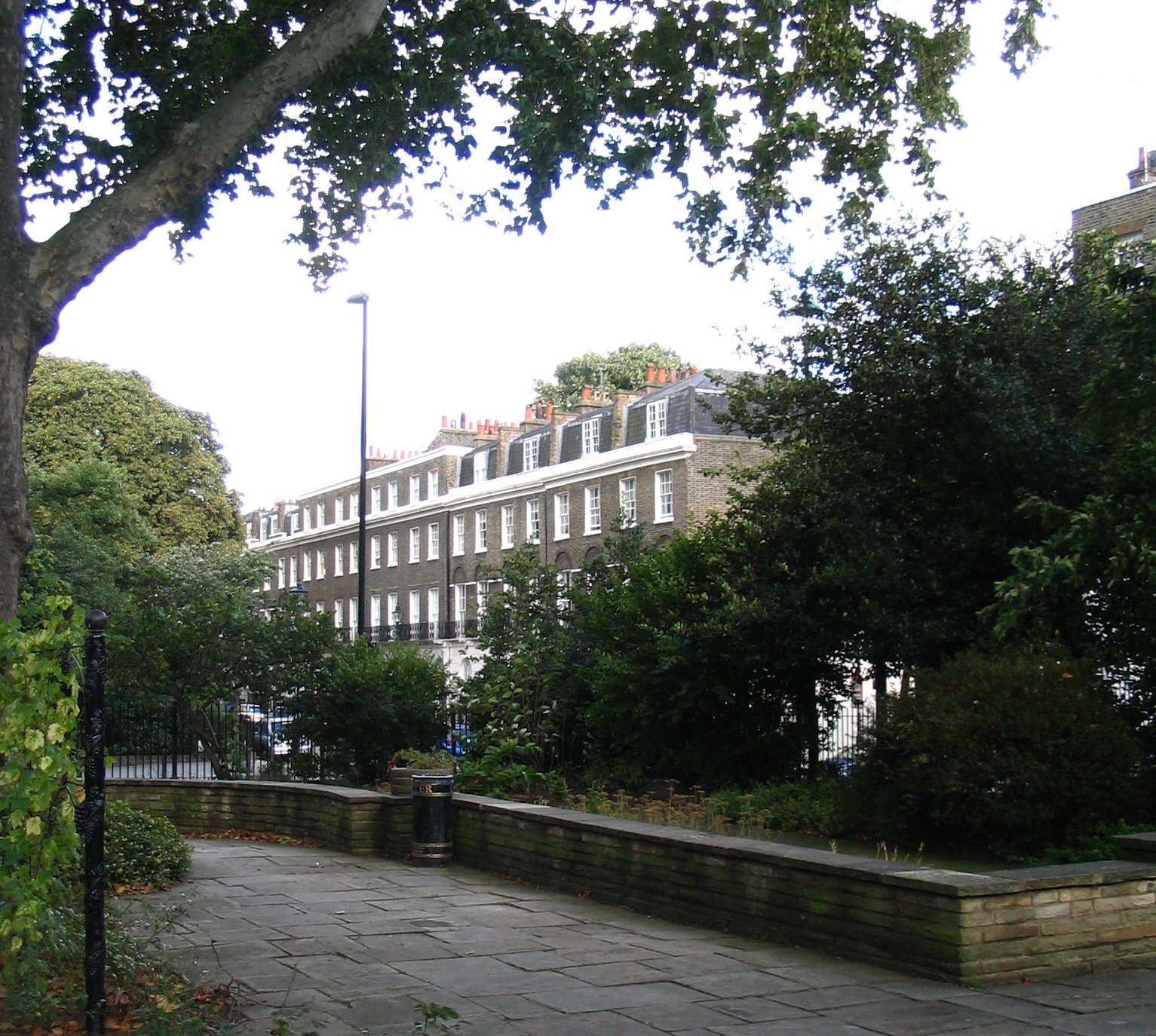
Canonbury Square, west side

Canonbury Square is a garden square in Canonbury, North London. It is bounded by terraces of mostly Georgian houses, many of which are listed buildings. The central public gardens contain attractive flower beds and several London plane trees of great age. The Evening Standard newspaper described it in 1956 as "London's most beautiful square". Many significant figures from the arts and literary worlds have lived in the square, including George Orwell, Evelyn Waugh, Samuel Phelps, Duncan Grant and Vanessa Bell.

== History ==
Henry Leroux of Stoke Newington started building the north-west range of the square in 1805, on land owned by the Marquess of Northampton. In 1812, when few properties had been built, the New North Road turnpike, now known as Canonbury Road, was constructed and bisected the square, creating east and west sides. The new road interfered with the quiet of the rudimentary square, affecting the economics of the venture and subsequently the unity of design of the buildings surrounding it and the time taken to complete construction. The layout is rectangular with a large villa, Northampton Lodge, in the centre of the terraces on the north side. The earliest terrace differs from the rest, and none of the sides join with each other. The east side bears a name-plaque at no. 28 which originally bore the name "Marquis Terrace", but it is now blank.

Like other parts of Islington, from the 1860s the area began to decline, largely because of the exodus along the railways to newer, more rural suburbs. By the end of the Second World War parts of the square had become derelict. Nos. 37-39 in the north-east section of the square were demolished, and the space created was filled with a terrace of five new houses of complementary design. From the 1960s, the square was rediscovered by middle-class families, the houses were renovated, and it became newly fashionable.

The central garden was formed in the 1840s. The 4th Marquess of Northampton opened his private square-gardens to the public in 1884, the first land-owner to do so, and in 1888 he donated the land to the Islington Council. The original railings were removed during the Second World War and replaced by chicken-wire netting, but in the 1950s the gardens were redesigned and enclosed with new reproduction railings.

== Places of interest ==
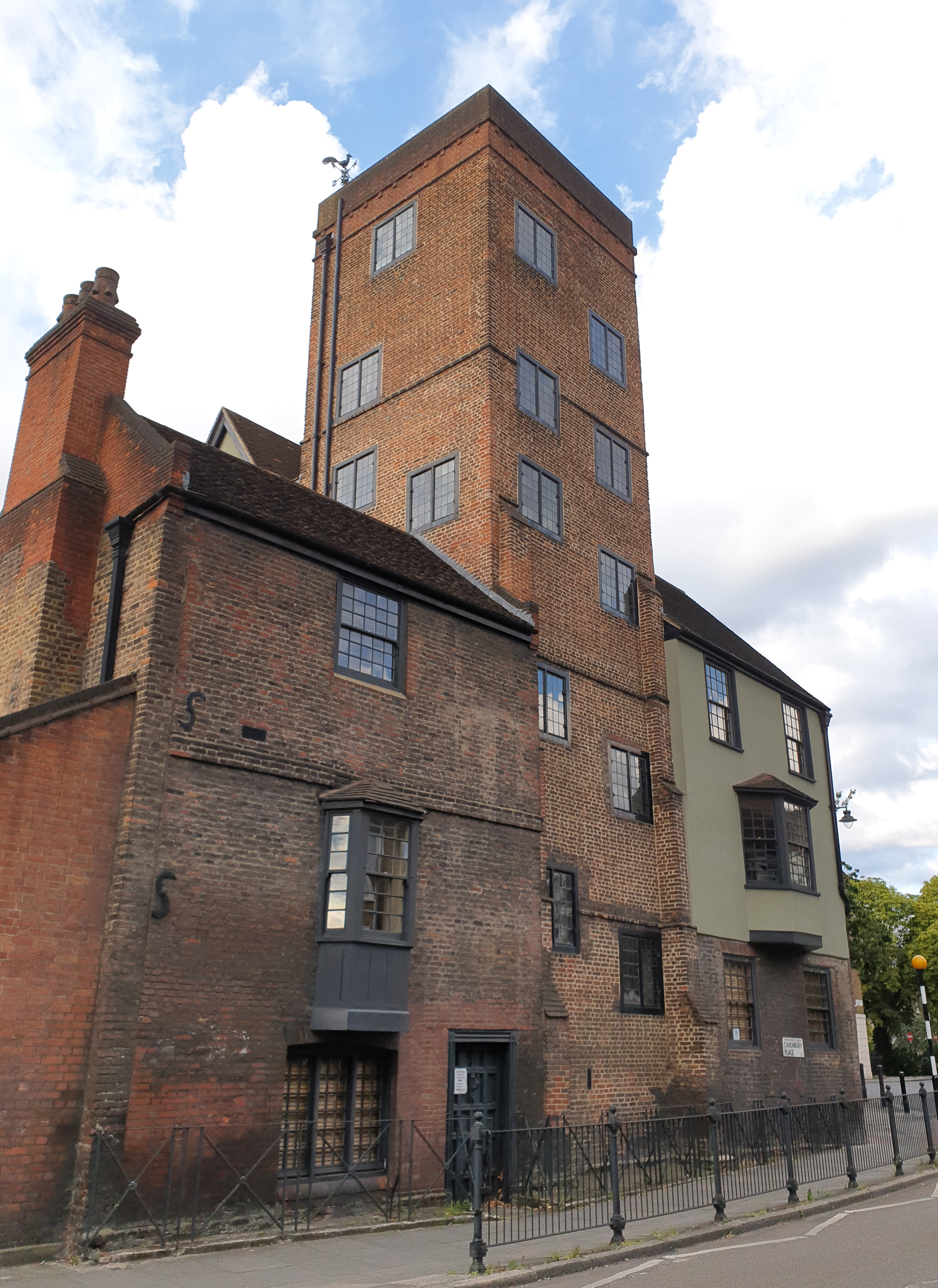
Canonbury Tower

- The Estorick Collection of Modern Italian Art occupies Northampton Lodge in Canonbury Square.
- Canonbury Tower, which lies just east of the square, was constructed between 1509 and 1532. The tower has been occupied by many historical figures, including Francis Bacon and Oliver Goldsmith. It has been used since 1998 as a Masonic research centre. Charles Dickens wrote a short story about a lamplighter in Canonbury, which features Canonbury Tower.

== Notable people ==
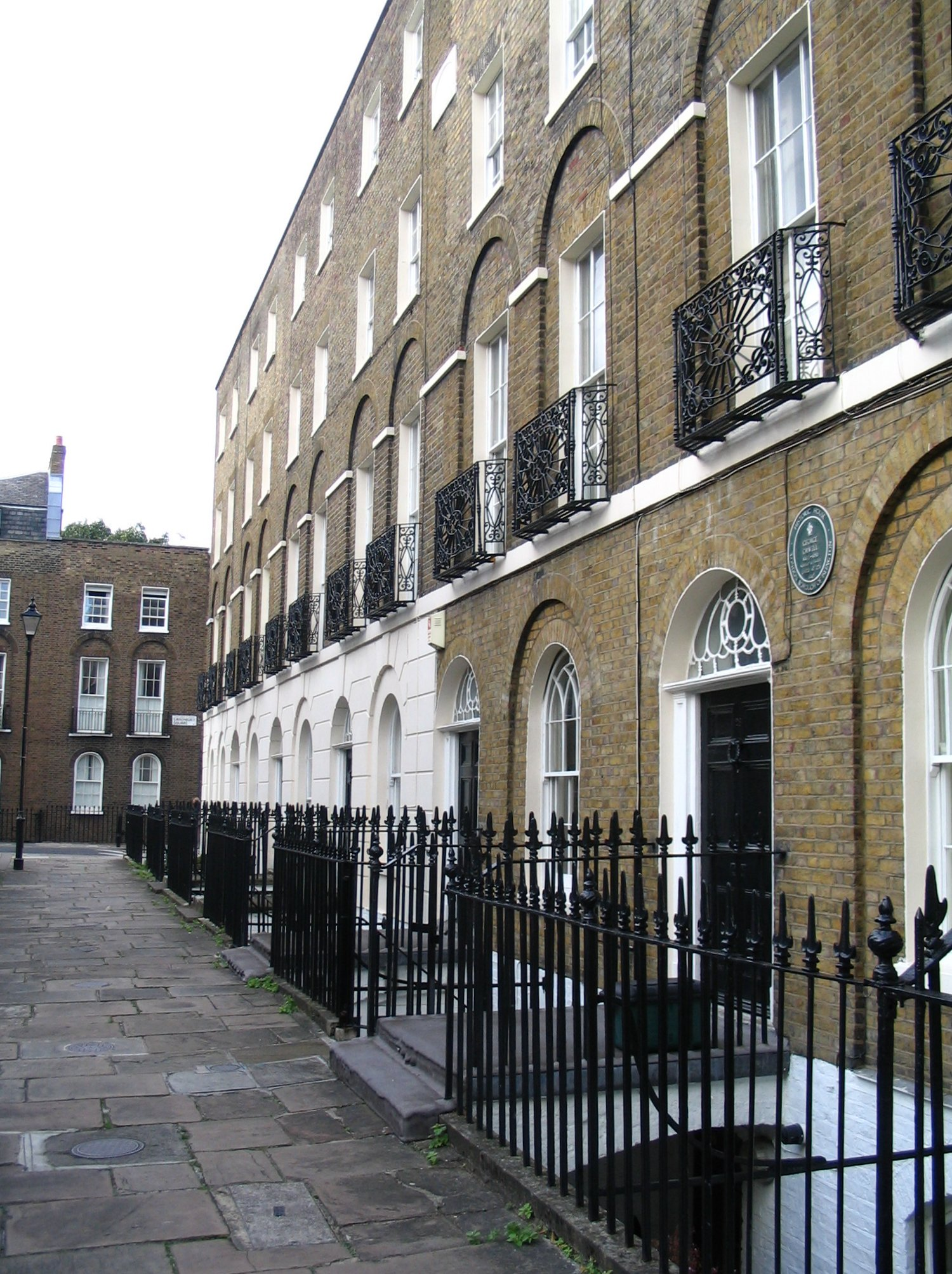
27b Canonbury Square, former home of George Orwell

- George Daniel, writer and book collector, lived at 18 Canonbury Square from about 1830.
- Joseph Chamberlain, statesman, attended a prep school at no. 36 in the 1840s before going to University College School.
- Samuel Phelps, actor and theatre manager, known for his productions of William Shakespeare's plays, lived at no. 8 from 1844 to 1866. A commemorative plaque marks his residency.
- Evelyn Waugh, writer, lived with his wife Evelyn Gardner at no. 17a from 1928 to 1930. His first two novels Decline and Fall and Vile Bodies were published while living there. At that time he described it as "half a house in a slum" and "our dilapidated Regency Square".
- George Orwell, novelist, essayist, journalist and critic, moved to no. 27b in the autumn of 1944, he and his wife having been bombed out of their previous flat. His novella Animal Farm was published in 1945 while he was living in the square, and parts of Nineteen Eighty-Four were written in the flat. He remained there with his wife and adopted child until his death in 1950. A commemorative plaque marks his residency on the top floor of the house. In 1946 he wrote of "the decaying slum in which I live".
- Georges Kopp, engineer and inventor, friend of George Orwell and his brigade commander in the Spanish Civil War
- Duncan Grant and Vanessa Bell, painters and designers, lived at no. 26a during the 1950s.

== In film ==
Canonbury Square appears in The Flesh is Weak (1957), and The Salvage Gang (Children's Film Foundation, 1958).
