= Dick Distich =

Dick Distich may refer to:

- A three volume novel by George Daniel
- A pseudonym of Alexander Pope
