= Tower Theatre Company =

British acting group founded 1932

Coordinates: 51.562°N 0.072°W

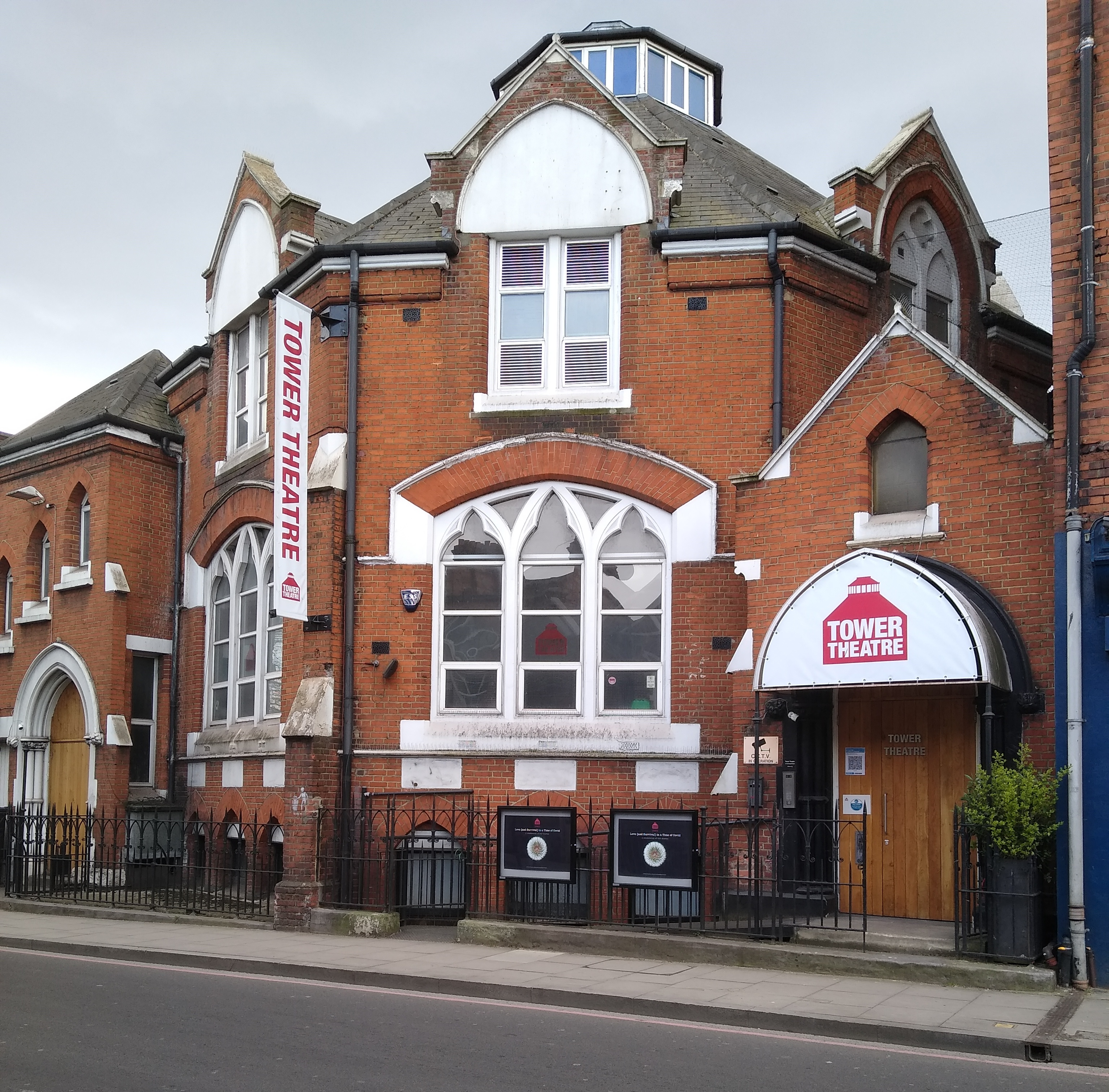
Tower Theatre, Northwold Road

The Tower Theatre Company is a performing non-professional acting group based in a building in Northwold Road, Stoke Newington, having moved there in April 2018 from the St Bride Institute (on the site of the former Bridewell Palace), in the City of London.

The group presents about 18 productions each year in London, either at their base theatre, or at other small theatres in the London area. During the summer months they also perform touring productions, with regular appearances at the open-air Théâtre de Verdure, which is in the Bois de Boulogne in Paris, and at the Minack Theatre in Cornwall.

The acting company was founded as the Tavistock Repertory Company in 1932, at the Tavistock Little Theatre in Tavistock Square, Bloomsbury. In 1952 it moved to its own premises in Islington at Canonbury Tower which included a 156-seat theatre known as the Tower Theatre. Over the years it has mounted nearly 1600 productions. The Tower Theatre's productions have always been mounted in publicly licensed theatres with tickets sold to the general public rather than simply to members. The company mounted early productions of Endgame by Samuel Beckett (1961, the first ever production to be designed by William Dudley) and The Birthday Party by Harold Pinter (May 1959). Both playwrights became major supporters of the Tower Theatre Company in later life. Actors to have worked with the company include Michael Gambon, Sian Phillips, Tom Courtenay and Alfred Molina.

The lease in Canonbury expired in 2003 and the company spent 15 years hiring theatre space at a number of venues, particularly the Bridewell Theatre, while searching for suitable new premises. It commissioned a new theatre at a site just off Curtain Road in Shoreditch, but due to funding difficulties it abandoned plans to proceed with that project. On 6 August 2008 archaeologists from the Museum of London excavating the site, prior to construction, announced that they had found the footings of a polygonal structure which they believe to be the remains of the north-eastern corner of the foundations of the first permanent theatre ever built in England.

== The Tower Theatre building ==
In 2018, the Tower Theatre Company found and purchased a building in Stoke Newington, formerly known as Sunstone House, and is now based there. The space was turned into "a performance space and production base for the company" thanks to a fundraising campaign.

A former Methodist chapel built in 1875, the building was damaged during World War II. In 1953, it was repaired and renovated by the congregation Beth Hamedrash Ohel Yisroel and consecrated as the Northwold Road Synagogue on 18 December 1955. It closed again in 1989.

The building was refitted in 1992 and became the Sunstone Women Only Health and Leisure Club, which closed in 2014. The fitting of a swimming pool in the basement, sauna cabins, a gym and a mezzanine level led to significant works required from the Tower Theatre Company to transform the space: the swimming pool was boarded over and is now used for storage; the saunas removed; and the mezzanine was removed to make space for dressing room facilities.

The new Tower Theatre opened in the building in September 2018 with a production of Shakespeare's Henry V, and most Tower Theatre Company productions are now staged there.

Like all theatres in the UK the Tower Theatre closed in March 2020 due to the Covid pandemic. However, activities continued in the form of "Virtual Tower" on zoom and a series of podcasts. With the easing of restrictions, productions were resumed in June 2021.
