= Mary Cosh =

British journalist and historian (1919–2019)

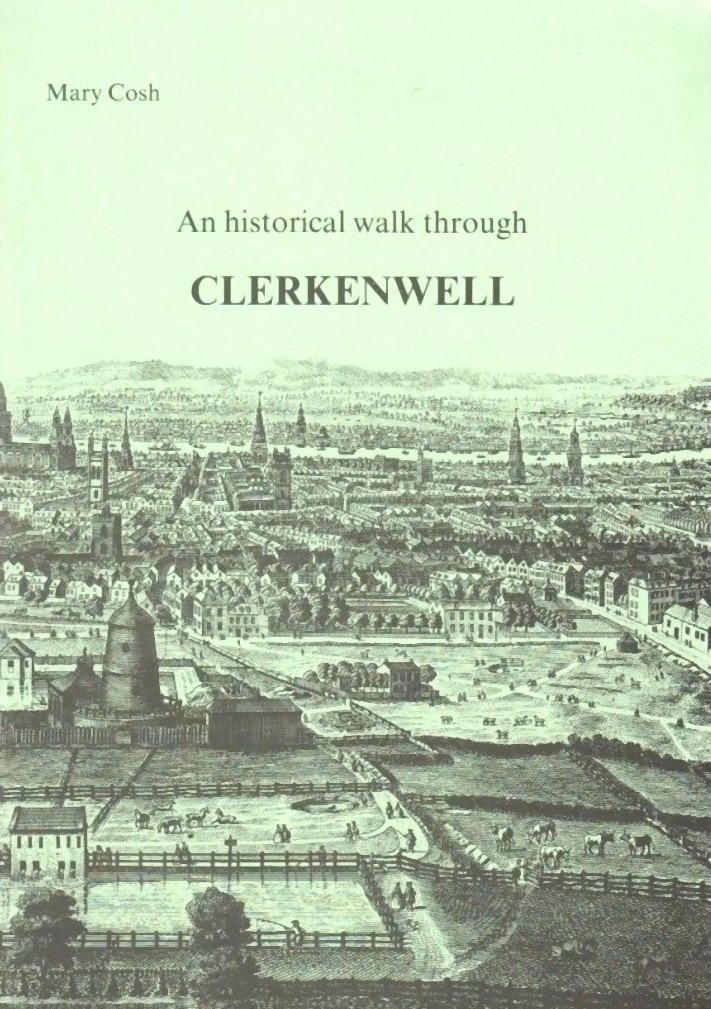
Cover of An historical walk through Clerkenwell by Mary Cosh.

Ethel Eleanor Mary Cosh, FSA (3 March 1919 – 17 December 2019) was a British freelance journalist and local historian who was known for her works on the history of Islington, London. Her book, A History of Islington (2005), was the first full-length history of the area since the mid-nineteenth century. She also wrote two historical works relating to Scotland. Cosh died in December 2019 at the age of 100.

== Early life ==
Mary Cosh was born in Bristol on 3 March 1919 to Arthur Strode (a director) and Ellen (Janisch) Cosh. She was educated at Clifton High School.

== Career ==
Cosh worked with the Ministry of Labour from 1937 to 1942. During the Second World War she served with the Women's Royal Naval Service from 1942 to 1945 where she became a Leading Wren. After the war she read English at St Anne's College, University of Oxford, graduating with a BA in 1949. From 1950 to 1951, Cosh worked with the Council of Industrial Design during the time of the Festival of Britain. From 1953, she worked as a freelance writer and researcher for other authors. One of these authors was James Leasor for whom she researched The Red Fort, War at the Top and The Plague and the Fire. Among other journals, she wrote for The Spectator, The Times and Country Life.

== Historical writing ==
Cosh wrote extensively on the history of Islington, including her masterwork, A History of Islington, published by Historical Publications in 2005, which was the first full-length history of the area since the mid nineteenth century. She also wrote two historical works relating to Scotland, firstly Inveraray and the Dukes of Argyll with Ian Lindsay, published by Edinburgh University Press in 1973, and Edinburgh, the golden age, published in 2005. That work dealt with the social and cultural life of Edinburgh during the Scottish Enlightenment, covering the period 1760 to 1832 and drawing on contemporary accounts in literature, newspapers, letters and journals. Cosh became a fellow of the Society of Antiquaries of London in 1986.

== Selected publications ==
=== Fiction ===
- The real world. Cassell, London, 1961.

=== Non-fiction ===
- Inveraray and the Dukes of Argyll. Edinburgh University Press, Edinburgh, 1973. (With Ian G. Lindsay) ISBN 978-0852241875
- An historical walk through Clerkenwell. Islington Libraries, London, 1980. ISBN 978-0902260078 (2nd revised edition 2007)
- History of St. Stephen's Church, Canonbury: The building and the people from its consecration in June 1839 to June 1989. St Stephen's Church, Canonbury, 1989. ISBN 978-0951487808
- An historical walk through Barnsbury. Islington Archaeology & History Society, London, 1981. ISBN 978-0950753201 (2nd revised edition 2001)
- A Regents Canal walk: From Camden Lock to City Road Basin. Isledon Publications, 1985.
- An historical walk along the New River. Islington Archaeology & History Society, London, 1988. ISBN 978-0950753232 (3rd revised edition 2001)
- The squares of Islington. Part 1, Finsbury and Clerkenwell. Islington Archaeology & History Society, London, 1990. ISBN 0950753254
- The squares of Islington. Part 2, Islington parish. Islington Archaeology & History Society, London, 1993. ISBN 0950753262
- McBean, Angus. (2001) Angus McBean in Islington. London: Islington Archaeology & History Society. (Editor)
- Edinburgh, the golden age. John Donald, 2005. ISBN 978-0859765718
- A history of Islington. Historical Publications, London, 2005. ISBN 978-0948667978
- 53 Cross Street: The biography of a house. Islington Archaeology & History Society, London, 2001. (With Martin King) ISBN 9780954849009
