= George Daniel (writer) =

English writer and book collector (1789–1864)

George Daniel (1789–1864) was an English writer of miscellaneous works and book collector.

== Life ==
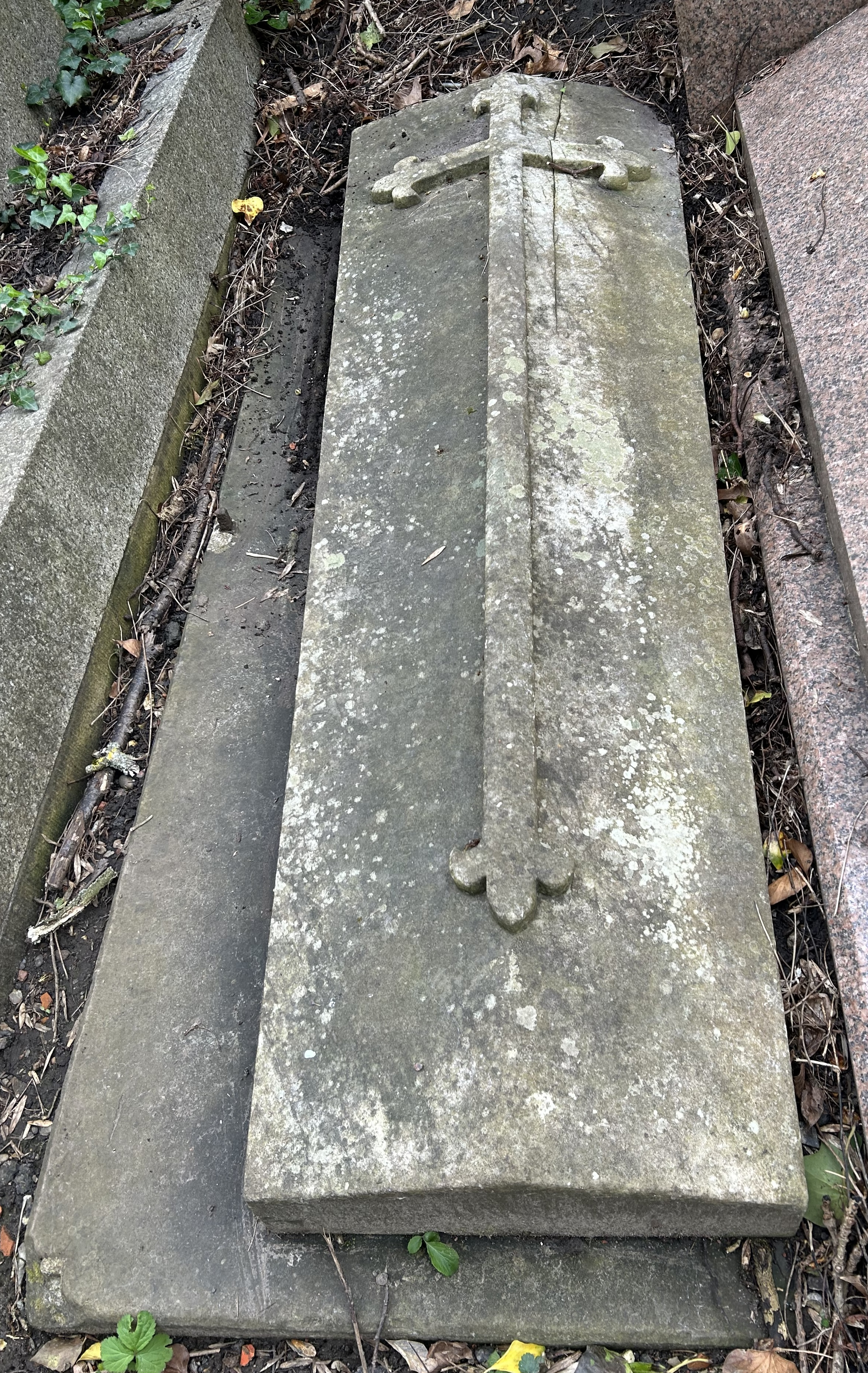
Grave of George Daniel in Highgate Cemetery.

Daniel was born on 16 September 1789, descended from Paul Danieli, a Huguenot who settled in England in the seventeenth century. His father died when he was eight years old. After receiving an education at Thomas Hogg's boarding school in Paddington Green, he became clerk to a stockbroker in Tokenhouse Yard, and was engaged in commerce for the greater part of his life. He lived at Islington, and in 1817 he made the acquaintance of Charles Lamb and of Robert Bloomfield, both of whom were his neighbours. Until Lamb's death in 1834 Daniel frequently spent the night in his society. Daniel also cultivated actors socially, and the British Museum gained the white satin bill of the play which John Kemble on his last appearance on the stage presented to Daniel in the Covent Garden green-room, on the night of 23 June 1817.

Daniel died suddenly of apoplexy, at his son's house at Stoke Newington, on 30 March 1864 and was buried in the dissenters section of the western side of Highgate Cemetery.

== Works ==
=== Verse ===
At sixteen he printed "Stanzas on Nelson's Victory and Death" (1805). Between 1808 and 1811 he contributed poems to Rudolph Ackermann's Poetical Magazine, including a satire in heroics entitled Woman. In 1811 he issued anonymously, in a separate volume, a similar poem, entitled "The Times, a Prophecy" (enlarged edit. 1813), and in 1812 he published under his own name Miscellaneous Poems, which included Woman and more solemn effusions already printed in Ackermann's magazine.

An ambitious follower of Charles Churchill and Peter Pindar, he found his satirical opportunity at the close of 1811. According to his own version of the affair, it was then rumoured that Lord Yarmouth had horsewhipped the Prince Regent at Oatlands, the Duke of York's house, for making improper overtures to the Marchioness of Hertford, Yarmouth's mother-in-law. On this incident Daniel wrote a squib in verse, which he called "R—y—l Stripes; or a Kick from Yar—th to Wa—s; with the particulars of an Expedition to Oat—ds and the Sprained Ancle: a poem, by P—— P——, Poet Laureat". Effingham Wilson of Cornhill printed the poem and advertised its publication; but it was suppressed and bought up, before it was published, in January 1812, by order of the Prince Regent, and through the instrumentality of Lord Yarmouth and Colonel McMahon, a large sum being given to the author for the copyright. It was advertised and placarded, which drew public attention to it, and a copy was by some means procured by the parties, who applied to the publisher before any copies were circulated. The author secured four copies only, one of which he sold to a public institution for five guineas. "A man at the West End of the town who had procured a copy made a considerable sum by advertising and selling manuscript copies at half-a-guinea each" (Daniel's manuscript note in British Museum copy of R—y—l Stripes). But Daniel was not quieted: under the pseudonym of "P—— P——, poet laureate", he published other squibs on royal scandals, of which the chief were: "Sophia's Letters to the B—r—n Ger—b [i.e., Geramb], or Whiskers in the Dumps, with old sighs set to new tunes" (1812); "Suppressed Evidence on R—l Intriguing, being the History of a Courtship, Marriage, and Separation, exemplified in the fate of the Princess of ——, by P—— P——, Poet Laureat, Author of 'R—l Stripes'" (1813) (suppressed), and "The R—l First Born, or the Baby out of his Leading Strings, containing the Particulars of a P—y Confirmation by B—p of O—g, by P—— P——, Poet Laureat, Author of the suppressed poem", 1814.

Daniel next turned his attention to the poetasters and petty journalists of the day, and these he satirised in The Modern Dunciad, a satire, with notes biographical and critical, 1814, 2nd edit. 1816. He also applauded Lord Byron, George Crabbe, William Cowper, and Robert Southey, to whom in later editions he added Robert Burns. In 1835 he collected and revised a few poems, The Modern Dunciad, Virgil in London, which had originally appeared in 1814, The Times, and some short pieces.

=== Drama and the theatre ===
On 21 July 1818 a 'serio-comick-bombastick-operatick interlude' by Daniel, entitled 'Doctor Bolus,' was acted at the English Opera House (afterwards the Lyceum) with great success. The principal parts were filled by Fanny Kelly, John Pritt Harley, and William Simmonds Chatterley, and Harley became one of Daniel's friends. The piece was printed soon after its performance, and went through two editions. On 1 December 1819 a musical farce, 'The Disagreeable Surprise,' by Daniel, was acted at Drury Lane, and in 1833 another of his farces, 'Sworn at Highgate,' was performed.

Meanwhile, he had undertaken the task of editing for John Cumberland, a publisher, his British Theatre, with Remarks Biographical and Critical, printed from the Acting Copies as performed at the Theatres Royal, London. The first volume was issued in 1823, and the last (thirty-ninth) in 1831. For each of the plays of this edition, which numbered nearly three hundred, and included nearly all Shakespeare's works, and the whole eighteenth-century drama, Daniel, under the initial 'D———G,' wrote a preface.

In 1831 and 1832 he prepared an appendix of fourteen volumes, which was known as Cumberland's Minor Theatre, and in 1838 and later years these two series were republished consecutively in sixty-four volumes. Subsequently, Daniel helped to edit portions of T. H. Lacy's Acting Edition of Plays and Davison's Actable Drama, in continuation of Cumberland's Plays. He was working at the latter series as late as 1862. He saw the talent of Marie Wilton in 1862, in her performance of Thomas Morton's Great Russian Bear. In 1838 he had commented in similar terms on Mary Anne Stirling, when editing Mrs. Cornwell's Venus in Arms for Cumberland. His remarks on Mary Russell Mitford's Rienzi in Cumberland's series were republished separately in 1828.

=== Prose and later works ===
A prose novel in three volumes called Dick Distich, which Daniel says he wrote when he was eighteen, was printed anonymously in 1812; it is a story of the struggles of a Grub Street author. In 1819 he and James Robinson Planché produced 'More Broad Grins, or Mirth versus Melancholy,' and in 1821 Daniel edited 'Chef d'Œuvres from French Authors, from Marot to Delille,' in two volumes. He published in 1829 a scurrilous attack on Charles Kean's domestic life, entitled 'Ophelia Kean, a dramatic legendary tale,' which was suppressed.

He contributed to Bentley's Miscellany a long series of gossipy papers on old books and customs, which he issued in two volumes in 1842, under the title of 'Merrie England in the Olden Time,' with illustrations by John Leech and George Cruikshank. This was followed by a religious poem, 'The Missionary,' in 1847, and by 'Democritus in London, with the Mad Pranks and Comical Conceits of Motley and Robin Goodfellow, to which are added Notes Festivous and the Stranger Guest,' in 1852. 'Democritus' is a continuation in verse of the 'Merrie England,' and the 'Stranger Guest' is another religious poem. His last published work was 'Love's Last Labour not Lost' (1863), and included his recollections of Charles Lamb and Robert Cruikshank, with a reply to Thomas Babington Macaulay's essay on Samuel Johnson, and many genial essays in prose and verse. The volume concludes, a little incongruously, with a pious and very long poem Non omnis moriar.

== Collector ==
Daniel bought copies of the first four folio editions of Shakespeare's works, and of many of the quarto editions of separate plays. His collection of black-letter ballads was especially notable, and he issued in 1856 twenty-five copies of 'An Elizabethan Garland, being a Descriptive Catalogue of seventy Black-letter Ballads printed between 1559 and 1597.' Daniel purchased these and seventy-nine other ballads from a Mr. Fitch, postmaster of Ipswich, for £60; he sold the seventy-nine to a bookseller acting for Richard Heber for £70; at the sale of his library, those retained by Daniel fetched £750.

On 22 August 1835 he bought at Charles Mathews's sale, for forty-seven guineas, the cassolette, or carved casket made out of the mulberry-tree of Shakespeare's garden, and presented to David Garrick with the freedom of the borough of Stratford-on-Avon in 1769. Daniel was proud of this relic, and wrote a description of it, which was copiously illustrated, for Charles John Smith's Literary Curiosities in 1840, together with a sketch of Garrick's theatrical career, entitled Garrick in the Green-room. Garrick's cane was also his property, together with a rich collection of theatrical prints, a small number of water-colours by David Cox, Stansfield, David Wilkie, and others.

== Legacy ==
By his will Garrick's cassolette passed to the British Museum. The rest of his literary collection was sold by auction on 20 July 1864 and the nine following days, and realised £15,865 12s. His first folio Shakespeare fetched £716 2s. and was purchased by the Baroness Burdett Coutts.

Three volumes of cuttings from printed works and engravings, arranged by Daniel, together with some manuscript notes by him, went to the British Museum: 1. 'An Account of Garrick's Cassolette.' 2. 'An Account from contemporary sources of the Shakespeare Jubilee of 1769.' 3. 'Accounts of the Sale of Shakespeare's House in 1847, of the subsequent Purchases made by the Public at Stratford-on-Avon, and of the Perkins Folio Controversy.'
