= Harold Jones (drummer) =

American drummer

- Performing at the White House in 1962

Background information
- Born: February 27, 1940 (age 86); Richmond, Indiana, U.S.
- Genres: Jazz, traditional pop, swing
- Occupation: Musician
- Instrument: Drums
- Years active: 1950s–present

Harold Jones (born February 27, 1940) is an American traditional pop and jazz drummer who is best known as the drummer for Tony Bennett and for his five years with the Count Basie Orchestra.

In a career spanning six decades, Jones has toured and recorded with Frank Sinatra, Duke Ellington, Oscar Peterson, Herbie Hancock, B.B. King, Ray Charles and Tony Bennett. He has also played with major symphony orchestras, including those in Boston, Atlanta, Chicago, London, Los Angeles, San Francisco, and Vienna.

== Career ==
Born and raised in Richmond, Indiana, Jones's parents encouraged his childhood musical development. Already a skilled drummer by high school, his mother drove him to Indianapolis, Indiana, to perform with Wes Montgomery, who left the stage with his band while Jones played a twenty-minute drum solo.

He attended the American Conservatory of Music in Chicago on a scholarship, then started his career as a freelance musician. In 1967, while house drummer at the Chicago Playboy Club, he was invited to New York for what was intended to be a two-week engagement with Count Basie's orchestra but which lasted five years. Jones played on fifteen albums with Basie. He also appears in a scene featuring the Basie band in the movie Blazing Saddles.

Jones says he was an avid student of other drummers, but he was especially influenced by one of Basie's drummers. "I am proud to say that I took everything that I could from Sonny Payne," he told an interviewer.

After leaving the Basie band, Jones was much in demand. He toured with Ella Fitzgerald, then for ten years with Sarah Vaughan. He also toured and recorded with Natalie Cole, including on her album Unforgettable... with Love. In 1962, he was a member of the Paul Winter Sextet, the first jazz group to play at the White House since the 1920s. The group had finished a tour of Latin America on behalf of United States Cultural Exchange Programs. Jones has played at the White House five times. In 2004, Jones joined Tony Bennett as his drummer for recordings and touring. He stayed with him until Bennett retired in 2021. Still a touring drummer, Jones also teaches drumming at college workshops.

== Personal life ==
Jones has lived for many years with his second wife Denise in Woodacre, California. The pair married June 9, 1983, and they have a son. Jones married his first wife, Paulette, in 1961. During their ten-year marriage they had a son and a daughter: Jay and Joy.

Jones's brother, Melvyn "Deacon" Jones, was a blues and soul organist.

== Awards and accolades ==
In 2013 Jones was inducted into the Percussive Arts Society Hall of Fame. In 1972 he won Best New Artist in the Down Beat magazine critics' poll. Saxophonist and band leader Paul Winter called Jones "the personification of jazz." Music critic Bruce H. Klauber has written that, "Jones is the quintessential big-band drummer with a crisp, clean sound notable for the high-pitched snare drum crack." Critic Jess Hamlin called Jones, "One of the best drummers in the business." Basie is said to have told drummer Louie Bellson that "Harold Jones was my favorite drummer."

Jones is the subject of a biography published in 2011, Harold Jones: The Singer's Drummer.

On June 16, 2026, at Jazz at Lincoln Center's Frederick P. Rose Hall, Jones was presented with the Musicians' Enduring Legacy Organization's annual MELO Enduring Legacy Award for his outstanding contributions to modern American music. "Workers don't always get the credit," said Jones, who was presented with the award by MELO founder and CEO Josephine Beavers in a glittering evening emceed by journalist Bill Whitaker. "People see the name that goes up on the billboard, but it doesn't list everyone in the band. I felt like the headliner that night."

== Discography ==
Unless otherwise noted, Information is based on Harold Jones' AllMusic web page

With Christina Aguilera

- My Kind of Christmas (RCA Records, 2000)

With Ernestine Anderson

- Live at the 1990 Concord Jazz Festival Third Set (Concord Records, 1991)

With Count Basie

- Basie Straight Ahead (Dot Records, 1968)

With Tony Bennett

- Duets: An American Classic (Columbia Records, 2006)
- A Swingin' Christmas (Columbia, 2008)
- Duets II (Columbia, 2011)
- Viva Duets (Columbia, 2012)

With Elvin Bishop

- The Blues Rolls On (Delta Groove, 2008)

With Raquel Bitton

- Sings Edith Piaf (R.B., 1999)
- Dream a Little Dream (R.B., 2002)

With Richard Boone

- The Singer (Storyville, 1988)

With Bruce Broughton

- Miracle on 34th Street: Original Soundtrack Album (BMG, 1994)

With Red Callender

- Basin Street Brass (Legend, 1973)

With Judy Carmichael

- Two Handed Stride (Progressive, 1982)

With Benny Carter

- 'Live and Well in Japan! (Pablo, 1978)

With Natalie Cole

- Unforgettable... with Love (Elektra Records, 1991)
- Take a Look (Elektra Records, 1993)
- Holly & Ivy (Elektra, 1994)
- Stardust (Elektra Records, 1996)
- Snowfall on the Sahara (Elektra Records, 1999)
- Still Unforgettable (Atco, 2008)

With Michael Feinstein

- Such Sweet Sorrow (Atlantic Records, 1995)

With Lady Gaga and Tony Bennett

- Cheek to Cheek (Columbia Records, 2014)
- Love for Sale (Columbia Records, 2021)

With João Gilberto

- João Gilberto and the Stylists of Bossa Nova Sing Antonio Carlos Jobim (Cherry Red, 2017)

With Amy Grant

- Home for Christmas (A&M Records, 1992)

With Bunky Green

- Playin' for Keeps (Cadet, 1966)

With John Handy

- Carnival (ABC Records, 1977)

With Eddie Harris Jazz Band

- The Exodus to Jazz (Vee-Jay, 1961)
- Mighty Like a Rose (Vee-Jay, 1961)
- A Study in Jazz (Vee-Jay, 1962)

With Gene Harris

- Black and Blue (Concord Records, 1991)
- World Tour 1990 (Concord Records, 1991)

With Linda Hopkins

- Deep in the Night (View Video, 2009)

With Quincy Jones & Sammy Nestico Orchestra

- Basie and Beyond (Warner Bros. Records, 2000)

With Marian McPartland

- Plays the Benny Carter Songbook (Concord Records, 1990)
- Silent Pool (Concord Records, 1997)

With Walter Norris Trio

- Lush Life (Concord Records, 1991)

With Oscar Peterson

- Soul Español (Limelight, 1966)

With Pitbull

- El Mariel (Bad Boy Latino, 2006)
- The Boatlift (Bad Boy Latino, 2007)

With Diane Schuur

- Pure Schuur (GRP, 1991)

With Andy Simpkins Quintet

- Calamba (Discovery, 1989)

With Michael W. Smith

- Christmastime (Reunion, 1998)

With Thomas Talbert

- Louisiana Suite (Sea Breeze, 1977)

With Clark Terry

- Reunion (D'Note Classics, 1995)

With John Travolta and Olivia Newton-John

- This Christmas (UME, 2012)

With Sarah Vaughan

- Crazy and Mixed Up (Pablo, 1982)

With Sarah Vaughan and Los Angeles Philharmonic

- Gershwin Live! (Columbia Records, 1982)

With Larry Vuckovich and Jon Hendricks

- Reunion (Tetrachord, 2004)

With Robbie Williams

- Swing When You're Winning (Chrysalis Records, 2001)

With Paul Winter Sextet

- Jazz Meets the Bossa Nova (Columbia Records, 1962)

With Paul Winter Consort

- Spanish Angel (Living Music, 1993)

With Amy Winehouse

- Lioness: Hidden Treasures (Island, 2011)
