= Excursions (Eddie Harris album) =

Studio album by Eddie Harris
- Released: 1973
- Recorded: March 8 & 9, 1966, March 20, 1967 and January 8, 1973; New York City
- Genre: Jazz
- Length: 83:36
- Label: Atlantic; SD 2-311
- Producer: Arif Mardin, Marvin Lagunoff, Eddie Harris

Eddie Harris chronology
Eddie Harris Sings the Blues (1972)	Excursions (1973)	E.H. in the U.K. (1974)

Excursions is an album by the American jazz saxophonist Eddie Harris released on the Atlantic label, mainly recorded in 1973 but featuring some tracks recorded in 1966 and 1967. The album includes two tracks recorded at the sessions for Mean Greens (Atlantic, 1966) and four tracks recorded at the sessions for The Electrifying Eddie Harris (Atlantic, 1967).

== Reception ==
Professional ratings
Review scores
Source	Rating
Allmusic	4.5/5 stars

The Allmusic review says, "Eddie Harris is heard in top form on the diverse program, some of which is funky and some of which is purely straightahead."

== Track listing ==
All compositions by Eddie Harris except as indicated

Disc One:

1. "Drunk Man" - 3:19
2. "Renovated Rhythm" - 4:53
3. "Inapplicable Concord" - 4:09
4. "Listen Here Goes Funky" - 8:21
5. "Turbulence" (Harris, Muhal Richard Abrams, Billy James, Ronald Muldrow, Rufus Reid) - 16:35
6. "Of Age" (Harris, Jodie Christian) - 3:05
- Recorded in New York City on March 20, 1967 (track 6) and January 8, 1973 (track 1–5)

Disc Two:

1. "Fragmentary Apparitions" - 10:46
2. "Hey Wado" - 5:53
3. "Aleph the Fool" - 4:31
4. "Recess" - 5:40
5. "I'm Lonely" (Marvin Lagunott) - 4:02
6. "Oleo" (Sonny Rollins) - 10:35
- Recorded in New York City on March 8, 1966 (track 4), March 9, 1966 (track 2), March 20, 1967 (tracks 3, 5 & 6) and January 8, 1973 (track 1)

== Personnel ==
- Eddie Harris - tenor saxophone, varitone, reed trumpet
- Jodie Christian (Disc One, track 6, Disc Two, tracks 3, 5 & 6), Cedar Walton (Disc Two, tracks 2 & 4) - piano
- Muhal Richard Abrams (Disc One, tracks 4 & 5), Larry Nash (Disc One, tracks 1–3, Disc Two, track 1) - electric piano
- Ronald Muldrow - electric guitar (Disc One, tracks 1–5)
- Ron Carter (Disc Two, tracks 2 & 4), Melvin Jackson (Disc One, track 6, Disc Two, tracks 3, 5 & 6), Rufus Reid (Disc One, tracks 1–5) - bass
- Billy Higgins (Disc Two, tracks 2 & 4), Billy James (Disc One, tracks 1, 4 & 5), Richard Smith (Disc One, track 6, Disc Two, tracks 3, 5 & 6) - drums
- Leon "Ndugu" Chancler - drums, percussion (Disc One, tracks 1–3, Disc Two, track 1)
- Ray Codrington (Disc Two, tracks 2 & 4), Frank Gordon (Disc One, tracks 1 & 3, Disc Two, track 1) - trumpet
- Billy Howell - trombone (Disc One, tracks 1 & 3, Disc Two, track 1)
- Andre Fischer, Marshall Thompson - percussion (Disc One, track 4)
- Vivian Harrell, Marilyn Haywood, Mary Ann Stewart - backing vocals (Disc One, track 4)
