= That Is Why You're Overweight =

Studio album by Eddie Harris
- Released: 1976
- Recorded: 1975
- Studios: The Village Recorder, Los Angeles; Brunswick, Chicago
- Genre: Jazz
- Length: 42:53
- Labels: Atlantic; SD 1683

Eddie Harris chronology
Bad Luck Is All I Have (1974)	That Is Why You're Overweight (1976)	The Reason Why I'm Talking S--t (1975)

That Is Why You're Overweight is an album by American jazz saxophonist Eddie Harris recorded in 1975 and released on the Atlantic label.

== Reception ==
Professional ratings
Review scores
Source	Rating
Allmusic	3/5 stars
The Rolling Stone Jazz Record Guide	2/5 stars

The Allmusic review stated: "Some of this stuff hits, some of it misses... all of it suggests that Harris' curiosity and impatience had him flailing around in search of a direction".

== Track listing ==
All compositions by Eddie Harris except as indicated

1. "It's All Right Now" – 3:56
2. "Why Do You Hurt Me" (Harris, Bradley Bobo) – 4:19
3. "Flowers" – 4:59
4. "That Is Why You're Overweight" (Harris, Sara Harris, Yvonne Harris) – 7:25
5. "Tryin' Ain't Dyin'" – 7:30
6. "Live Again" (Ronald Muldrow) – 4:18
7. "Ooh" – 2:49
8. "Exempt" – 7:37

== Personnel ==
- Eddie Harris – tenor saxophone, electric piano, vocals
- Ronald Muldrow – guitar, guitorgan, vocals
- Bradley Bobo – bass, 6 string bass, vocals
- Paul Humphrey, Terry Thompson – drums
- Buck Clarke – bongos, percussion, tambourine
- Calvin Barnes – drums, percussion, vocals
- Marshall Thompson – percussion (track 5)
- Bob Ramey – rhythm synthesizer (track 1)
- Muhal Richard Abrams (track 5), Bobby Lyle (track 2) – electric piano
- Odell Brown – organ (track 5)
- Lou Gonzales, Joe Romano – trumpet, flugelhorn (tracks 2, 4 & 8)
- Burgess Gardner, Frank Gordon – trumpet (track 5)
- Steve Galloway (track 5), Al Hall Jr. (tracks 2, 4 & 8), Maurice Spears (tracks 2, 4 & 8) – trombone
- Delbert Hill – baritone saxophone, oboe, bassoon, tenor saxophone (tracks 2, 4 & 8)
- Willie Henderson – baritone saxophone (track 5)
- Edmund Lee Bauer, Sol Bobrov, E. Zlatoff Mirsky – violin (track 5)
- Bruce K. Hayden, Harold H. Kupper – viola (track 5)
- Karl B. Fruh – cello (track 5)
- Vivian Harrell, Marilyn Haywood, Mary Ann Stewart, Stephana Loeb, Karen Patterson, Nancy Shanks – vocals
- Gerald Lee – arranger
