= Odell Brown =

American jazz organist (1940–2011)

Odell Elliott Brown Jr. (February 2, 1940 – May 3, 2011) was an American jazz organist / keyboard player. He was active in the late 1960s and early 1970s, playing soul jazz and jazz funk with his backing band as Odell Brown & the Organ-Izers. He is also co-writer of Marvin Gaye's 1982 "Sexual Healing" song, having created the main chord progression of the song as well as playing Fender Rhodes electric piano on the recording.

== Biography ==
Brown was born in Louisville, Kentucky. He started playing the piano aged 4 as his mother was a part-time piano teacher. His father bought him a baby grand piano. After playing in various junior and senior high school bands, he went to Nashville, Tennessee and met musicians attending Tennessee State A&M. Wishing to enroll himself, his plans were soon curtailed when he was drafted into the army where he joined the Army Post Band. During this period, he gained valuable insight into arranging and orchestrating.

After leaving the army, Brown moved to Chicago, where he was re-united with some of the musicians from his Nashville days. They formed a soul-jazz group, becoming known as The Organ-izers, and within two years were signed to Chess Records' jazz subsidiary label, Cadet. The band's personnel was Odell Brown, Hammond organ; Artee "Duke" Payne and Tommy Purvis, tenor saxophones; and Curtis Prince, drums. Their debut album was titled Raising The Roof in 1966 followed by their most popular record, 1967's Mellow Yellow, which reached #173 on the Billboard 200. Third album Ducky (1967) was the last to feature the original band.

While at Chess, Brown was not only signed to the label but also worked as a staff musician playing and arranging for a wealth of other artists and gaining great insight and expertise into other styles of music. After the death of Leonard Chess in 1969, Brown decided not to re-sign with the label and during the 1970s, pursued a solo career as an independent arranger, producer and studio musician. During this period, he worked with artists such as Minnie Riperton (with whom he arranged and conducted an album on Epic Records), Curtis Mayfield, Johnny Nash, and Marvin Gaye (both live and in the studio). Gaye's hit single "Sexual Healing", co-written by Brown, won two Grammy Awards. He received further awards recognizing his many talents, later in life.

Brown had lived in Richfield, Minnesota since the early 1990s, to stabilize his professional and personal life. He died there on May 3, 2011, at the age of 71.

== Discography ==
=== As leader ===
- Raising the Roof (Cadet, 1966)
- Mellow Yellow (Cadet, 1967, No. 173 US)
- Ducky (Cadet, 1967 [1968])
- Odell Brown Plays Otis Redding (Cadet, 1969)
- Free Delivery (Cadet, 1969 [1970])
- Odell Brown (Paula, 1974)

=== As sideman ===
With Dorothy Ashby

- Dorothy's Harp (Cadet, 1969)

With Cleveland Eaton

- Plenty Good Eaton (Black Jazz, 1975)

With Richard Evans

- Dealing with Hard Times (Atlantic, 1972)

With Marvin Gaye

- Marvin Gaye Live! (Tamla, 1976)
- Live at the London Palladium (Tamla, 1977)
- Here, My Dear (Tamla, 1978)
- Midnight Love (Columbia, 1982)

With Eddie Harris

- That Is Why You're Overweight (Atlantic, 1975)
- The Reason Why I'm Talking S--t (Atlantic, 1975)

With Minnie Riperton

- Perfect Angel (Epic, 1974)
- Stay in Love (Epic, 1977)

With Sonny Stitt and Bunky Green

- Soul in the Night (Cadet, 1966)
