= Bad Luck Is All I Have =

Studio album by Eddie Harris
- Released: 1975
- Recorded: 1974–75
- Studio: The Village Recorder, Los Angeles and Paragon Studios, Chicago
- Genre: Jazz
- Length: 44:09
- Label: Atlantic; SD 1675
- Producer: Eddie Harris

Eddie Harris chronology
I Need Some Money (1974)	Bad Luck Is All I Have (1975)	That Is Why You're Overweight (1975)

Bad Luck Is All I Have is an album by American jazz saxophonist Eddie Harris recorded in 1974 and 1975 and released on the Atlantic label.

== Reception ==
Professional ratings
Review scores
Source	Rating
Allmusic	1.5/5 stars

The Allmusic review stated "Eddie Harris had nearly as many voices as sax timbres – ranging from nasal, sly asides to electronically strangled yowls and even falsetto. But none of these Eddie Harrises, nor the spirited percussive help of Willie Bobo, could save the humdrum, mostly R&B-based material that he created for this album". Many people, however, enjoyed Harris' often hilarious songs on this and its companion album "That is Why You are Overweight," and Bradley Bobo's innovative work on the Fender Bass Six instrument has rarely been equalled, not even by Cream's Jack Bruce, who tried the instrument and discarded it after their first LP. The album has avid fans for good reasons.

== Track listing ==
All compositions and lyrics by Eddie Harris, except where noted.

1. "Get On Up and Dance" (lyrics: Lolita Harris, Yvonne Harris) – 3:30
2. "Bad Luck Is All I Have" – 8:40
3. "It Feels So Good" – 10:32
4. "Why Must We Part" (lyrics: Bradley Bobo) – 5:15
5. "Obnoxious" – 5:48
6. "Abstractions" – 10:24

== Personnel ==
- Eddie Harris – tenor saxophone, varitone, piano, electric piano, string synthesizer, vocals
- Ronald Muldrow – guitar, guitorgan, electric guitar, vocals
- Bradley Bobo – 6 string bass, vocals (tracks 1–4 & 6)
- Calvin Barnes – percussion, gourd, congas, vocals (tracks 1–3, 5 & 6)
- Willie Bobo – percussion, timpani, drums (tracks 1–4 & 6)
- Rufus Reid – bass (track 5)
- Derf – congas (track 5)
- Oscar Brashear – trumpet (tracks 1–3 & 6)
- Delbert Hill – baritone saxophone, English horn, tenor saxophone (tracks 1–3 & 6)
- The Gerald Lee Singers: Stephana Loeb, Louise "Lovely" Anglin, Mary Haynes – vocals (track 2)
