= Ronald Muldrow =

American jazz musician (1949–2007)

Ronald Muldrow (February 2, 1949, in Chicago – January 31, 2007, in Los Angeles) was an American soul jazz and hard bop jazz guitarist.

As an emerging jazz guitarist in the early 1970s, Muldrow connected with soul-jazz saxophonist Eddie Harris and contributed to many of his Atlantic albums from 1971 to 1976 and reunited with the saxophonist on Listen Here (1982).

A teenage Muldrow heard jazz guitarist Wes Montgomery play "Canadian Sunset" on the radio and was captivated. His first big-time gig was with the Staple Singers, a gospel group. He also taught at various colleges and had published guitar-instruction books. Muldrow began forming bands in high school and earned a bachelor's in jazz studies from Roosevelt University in Illinois and a master's in studio and jazz guitar from the USC Thornton School of Music.

Musician Georgia Anne Muldrow is his daughter.

== Discography ==
=== As leader ===
- Yesterdays (Enja, 1993)
- Diaspora (Enja, 1995)
- Facing Wes (Kokopelli, 1996)
- Freedom's Serenade (Double-Time, 1999)
- Mapenzi (Joh-Bev, 2003)

=== As sideman ===
With Eddie Harris

- Instant Death (Atlantic, 1972)
- Eddie Harris Sings the Blues (Atlantic, 1972)
- Excursions (Atlantic, 1973)
- Is It In (Atlantic, 1974)
- Bad Luck Is All I Have (Atlantic, 1975)
- I Need Some Money (Atlantic, 1975)
- That Is Why You're Overweight (Atlantic, 1975)
- The Reason Why I'm Talking S--t (Atlantic, 1976)
- How Can You Live Like That? (Atlantic, 1977)
- Listen Here! (Enja, 1993)
- Dancing By A Rainbow (Enja, 1996)

With others

- Les DeMerle, Concerts by the Sea (Bar T, 1978)
- Les DeMerle, Transcendental Watusi! (United National, 1979)
- Hubert Laws, Family (Columbia, 1980)
- Phil Perry, My Book of Love (Private Music, 2000)
- Sweet Baby J'ai, Evolution (Sunset Music, 2002)
- Luther Thomas, Yo' Momma (Moers, 1981)
