= The In Sound =

The In Sound may refer to:

- The In Sound (Eddie Harris album), 1965 jazz album released on Atlantic Records
- The In Sound (Gary McFarland album), 1965 jazz album released on Verve Records
