= God Bless the Child (Billie Holiday song) =

1942 single by Billie Holiday

Single by Billie Holiday
- B-side: "Solitude"
- Released: 1942
- Recorded: May 9, 1941
- Studio: Columbia 7th Ave, New York City
- Genre: Jazz
- Length: 2:57
- Label: Okeh
- Songwriters: Billie Holiday; Arthur Herzog Jr.
- Producer: Edward B. Marks Music

Billie Holiday singles chronology
"Strange Fruit" (1939)	"God Bless the Child" (1942)	"Good Morning Heartache" (1946)

"God Bless the Child" is a song written by Billie Holiday and Arthur Herzog Jr. in 1939. It was first recorded on May 9, 1941, by Billie Holiday and released by Okeh Records in 1942.

Holiday's version of the song was honored with the Grammy Hall of Fame Award in 1976. It was also included in the list of Songs of the Century, by the Recording Industry Association of America and the National Endowment for the Arts. In June 2026, CBS News included the song in its list of the 250 essential American songs of the past 250 years.

== Billie Holiday recording sessions ==
Billie Holiday recorded the song three times.

First recording (Session #44, Columbia/Okeh): Columbia Studio A, 799 Seventh Avenue, New York City, May 9, 1941, Eddie Heywood and his Orchestra with Roy Eldridge (trumpet), Jimmy Powell and Lester Boone (alto saxophone), Ernie Powell (trumpet), Eddie Heywood (piano), Johan Robins (guitar), Paul Chapman (guitar), Grachan Moncur II (bass), Herbert Cowans (drums), Billie Holiday (vocal).

== Origin and interpretation ==
In her autobiography Lady Sings the Blues, Holiday indicated that an argument with her mother over money led to the song. According to her autobiography, Billie Holiday had approached her mother for financial support. Her mother had benefited from Billie’s income in the past, but at this moment, she refused to help. Her mother’s remark made it clear that you cannot always expect help, even from the people you trust most. Holiday also felt emotionally abandoned. She stated that during the argument she said "God bless the child that's got his own", referring to self-reliance, financial independence and a harsh reality where people often only help you when you already have something yourself.

Holiday also noted that people who already have money, status, or possessions receive support more easily. Those who have little and need help are more often ignored, left to fend for themselves. Those who have their own means are protected against disappointment.

The anger over the incident led her to use that line as the starting point for a song, which she worked out in conjunction with Herzog.

In his 1990 book Jazz Singing, Will Friedwald describes the song as "sacred and profane," as it references the Bible while indicating that religion seems to have no effect in making people treat each other better.

== Notable versions ==
- 1958 – Harry Belafonte recorded the song for his album Belafonte Sings the Blues.
- 1959 – Trombonist J. J. Johnson recorded an emotion-filled instrumental ballad for his Really Livin' album, several weeks before Holiday's death in March 1959.
- 1961 – Saxophonist Eddie Harris recorded the song for his album Mighty Like a Rose; Harris's version received radio airplay.
- From 1961 to 1963 multi-instrumentalist Eric Dolphy recorded the theme on several occasions as a bass clarinet solo performance.
- 1962 – Saxophonist Sonny Rollins recorded a sparse version for his album The Bridge; guitarist Jim Hall backed him.
- 1968 – The blues rock–jazz fusion band Blood, Sweat & Tears interpreted the song on their double Platinum album Blood, Sweat & Tears, with vocals by David Clayton-Thomas.
- 1972 – Diana Ross performed the song in the 1972 film Lady Sings the Blues. The soundtrack album hit No.1 on the Billboard album chart for the weeks of April 7 & 14, 1973.
- 1983 – a fifteen-minute interpretation on Standards, Vol. 1, the inaugural album release by Keith Jarrett's Standards Trio with Gary Peacock and Jack De Johnette.
- In the late 1980s, David Peaston won several competitions on the Showtime at the Apollo television show with a powerful rendition of the song, which was included on his 1989 debut album Introducing...David Peaston.

== Other versions ==
- 1990 - On the album The Simpsons Sing The Blues, sung by 'Lisa', the jazz-kid of the Simpson family, with the vocals of Yeardley Smith and Kim Richmond on alto saxophone and Doug Norwine on the , baritone saxophone ('Lisa').
