= Joe Diorio =

American jazz guitarist (1936–2022)

- Born: Joseph Louis Diorio; August 6, 1936; Waterbury, Connecticut, U.S.
- Died: February 2, 2022 (aged 85)
- Genres: Jazz
- Occupations: Musician, teacher
- Instrument: Guitar
- Years active: 1960–2022
- Labels: Diorio, RAM, Spitball

Joseph Louis Diorio (August 6, 1936 – February 2, 2022) was an American jazz guitarist. He performed with Sonny Stitt, Hal Crook, Eddie Harris, Ira Sullivan, Stan Getz, Pat Metheny, Horace Silver, Anita O'Day, and Freddie Hubbard. In recent years he also recorded albums with modern performers including Robben Ford, Gary Willis, David Becker and Mick Goodrick.

Following in the footsteps of an uncle, Diorio took up the guitar, studying formally in the early 1950s at a local music school. He worked for a while with local bands, but in the early 1960s he ventured into New York City, where he played with several jazz musicians.

In April 2005 he struggled to regain the full use of his left hand following a stroke he suffered at his West Coast residence in San Clemente.

Diorio taught at the University of Southern California and was one of the original instructors at the Guitar Institute of Technology (GIT) in Los Angeles, alongside Don Mock and Ron Eschete, with the school later becoming part of the Musicians Institute. He published several instructional books and videos, and released ten albums under his name.

He died on February 2, 2022, at the age of 85.

== Discography ==
=== As leader ===
- Rapport with Wally Cirillo (Spitball, 1974)
- Solo Guitar (Spitball, 1975)
- Straight Ahead to the Light with Steve Bagby (Spitball, 1976)
- Soloduo with Wally Cirillo (Spitball, 1976)
- Peaceful Journey (Spitball, 1977)
- Bonita (Zdenek, 1980)
- Feedles with Gijs Hendriks, Bert Van Erk, Michael Baird (Timeless, 1980)
- 20th Century Impressions with Jeff Berlin, Vinnie Colaiuta (J Disc, 1981)
- Earth Moon Earth (Nocturne, 1987)
- Minor Elegance with Robben Ford (MGI, 1989)
- Italy (MGI, 1989)
- Double Take with Riccardo Del Fra (RAM, 1993)
- We Will Meet Again (RAM, 1993)
- Rare Birds with Mick Goodrick (RAM, 1993)
- More than Friends (RAM, 1994)
- The Breeze and I with Ira Sullivan (RAM, 1994)
- Narayani Joe DiOrio and Hal Crook (RAM, 1994)
- To Jobim with Love (RAM, 1996)
- I Remember You (RAM, 1998)

=== As sideman ===
With Pete & Conte Candoli

- The Candoli Brothers (Essential Media Group, 1978)

With Eddie Harris

- Exodus to Jazz (Vee-Jay, 1961)
- Mighty Like a Rose (Vee-Jay, 1961)
- Jazz for "Breakfast at Tiffany's" (Vee-Jay, 1961)
- A Study in Jazz (Vee-Jay, 1962)
- For Bird and Bags (Exodus, 1963)
- Come on Down (Atlantic, 1970)

With Sam Lazar

- Playback (Argo, 1962)

With Anita O'Day

- Mello'day (GNP Crescendo, 1978)

With Horace Silver

- Guides to Growing Up (Silveto, 1981)

With Sonny Stitt

- Move on Over (Argo, 1963)
- My Main Man (Argo, 1964) with Bennie Green

With Ira Sullivan

- Ira Sullivan (A&M, 1976) with Jaco Pastorius
- Peace (Fantasy, 1978)
- Multimedia (Galaxy Music, 1982)
- An Axe to Grind (Ken Tamplin and Friends) (Intense Records, 1990)

With David Becker

- The Color Of Sound (Acoustic Music Records, 2005)
