= Is It In =

Studio album by Eddie Harris
- Released: 1974
- Recorded: December 16 & 17, 1973; Paragon Studios, Chicago
- Genre: Soul jazz, jazz-funk
- Length: 42:54
- Label: Atlantic; SD 1659
- Producer: Geoffrey Haslam

Eddie Harris chronology
E.H. in the U.K. (1973)	Is It In (1974)	I Need Some Money (1974)

Is It In is an album by American jazz saxophonist Eddie Harris recorded in 1973 and released on the Atlantic label. It reached number 100 on the Billboard 200 chart.

== Reception ==
Professional ratings
Review scores
Source	Rating
Allmusic	4/5 stars

The Allmusic review stated "Eddie Harris makes a radical turn toward electronic R&B on this popping, enterprising LP of grooves, humorous one-off vignettes, and other eclectic pursuits. Driven by a standard drum kit and tacky-sounding electric bongos, some of Harris' most irresistible grooves ("Funkaroma," "Look Ahere") can be found here".

== Track listing ==
All compositions by Sara E. Harris except as indicated

1. "Funkaroma" (Eddie Harris, Billy James, Ronald Muldrow, Rufus Reid) – 4:58
2. "Happy Gemini" – 3:01
3. "Is It In" (Muldrow) – 3:35
4. "It's War" (Harris, James, Muldrow) – 6:20
5. "Space Commercial" (Harris, James, Muldrow) – 5:28
6. "Look Ahere" – 3:48
7. "These Lonely Nights" – 5:46
8. "House Party Blues" (Harris, James, Muldrow, Reid) – 8:03
9. "Tranquility & Antagonistic" – 4:15
- Recorded at Paragon Recording Studios in Chicago on December 16 (tracks 1–3, 5 & 7) and December 17 (tracks 4, 6, 8 & 9), 1973

== Personnel ==
- Eddie Harris – tenor saxophone, varitone, piano, electric piano, vocals
- Ronald Muldrow – guitar, guitorgan
- Rufus Reid – electric bass, bass
- Billy James – drums, bongos
