= For Bird and Bags =

Studio album by Eddie Harris
- Released: 1965
- Recorded: 1963; Chicago
- Genre: Jazz
- Length: 35:41
- Label: Exodus; EX/EXS-6002
- Producer: Donald Elfman

Eddie Harris chronology
Half and Half (1963)	For Bird and Bags (1965)	Cool Sax, Warm Heart (1964)

Sculpture Cover

Professional ratings
Review scores
Source	Rating
Allmusic	4/5 stars

For Bird and Bags is an album by American jazz saxophonist Eddie Harris recorded for the Vee-Jay label but released on Exodus when Vee-Jay was struggling financially. The album was also released on the Buddah label as Sculpture in 1969.

== Reception ==
The Allmusic review states "Throughout, Harris (whose mastery of the extreme upper register and immediately recognizable sound are both quite impressive) is in excellent form".

== Track listing ==
All compositions by Eddie Harris except as indicated

1. "Salute to Bird" – 8:47
2. "I'm As Happy As I Want To Be" – 5:35
3. "The River Nile" – 5:00
4. "Salute to Bags" – 9:57
5. "Samba de Orfeu" (Luiz Bonfá, Antônio Carlos Jobim) – 2:50
6. "Only the Lonely" (Sammy Cahn, Jimmy Van Heusen) – 3:42
7. "Checkmate" (John Williams) – 4:50

== Personnel ==
- Eddie Harris – tenor saxophone, piano
- Charles Stepney – piano, vibes
- Willie Pickens – piano
- Joe Diorio, Roland Faulkner – guitar
- Melvin Jackson – bass
- Marshall Thompson – drums
