= I Need Some Money =

Studio album by Eddie Harris
- Released: 1975
- Recorded: July 15 and December 2, 1974
- Studio: Paragon, Chicago
- Genre: Jazz
- Length: 45:00
- Label: Atlantic; SD 1669
- Producer: Geoffrey Haslam

Eddie Harris chronology
Is It In (1973)	I Need Some Money (1975)	Bad Luck Is All I Have (1975)

I Need Some Money is an album by American jazz saxophonist Eddie Harris, recorded in 1974 and released on the Atlantic label.

== Reception ==
Professional ratings
Review scores
Source	Rating
AllMusic	2.5/5 stars
The Penguin Guide to Jazz Recordings	2.5/4 stars

The AllMusic review stated, "Eddie Harris finally steps out as a singer in the first of a series of humorous hard-luck songs that would be the flagships of his next few LPs... In any case, the thing he still does best here is ride a groove, the best of which is the extremely danceable... There are indications, though, that Harris' repertoire of funk sax licks is beginning to run a bit thin".

== Track listing ==
All compositions by Eddie Harris except as indicated

1. "I Need Some Money" (Harris, Bradley Bobo, Durf, Ronald Muldrow) – 3:10
2. "Get On Down" (Calvin Barnes, Durf, Ronald Muldrow, Rufus Reid) – 9:48
3. "Time to Do Your Thing" (Sara E. Harris) – 6:12
4. "Carnival" – 4:14
5. "Don't Want Nobody" (Sara E. Harris) – 11:52
6. "Bumpin" (Harris, Ronald Muldrow) – 4:11
7. "That's It" – 5:31
- Recorded at Paragon Studios in Chicago on July 15 (tracks 2 & 4–6) and December 2 (tracks 1, 3 & 7), 1974

== Personnel ==
- Eddie Harris – tenor saxophone, varitone, piano, organ, electric piano, reed trumpet, vocals
- Ronald Muldrow – guitar, guitorgan, cabasa
- Rufus Reid – electric bass, bass (tracks 2 & 4–6)
- Bradley Bobo – bass, 6 string bass (tracks 1, 3 & 7)
- Durf – congas, vocals, African whistle, talking drum, timpani, tablas, barrel drum
- Calvin Barnes – drums, quica, Latin percussion
