= How Can You Live Like That? =

Studio album by Eddie Harris
- Released: 1977
- Recorded: November 20, 1976; The Village Recorder, Los Angeles
- Genre: Jazz
- Length: 41:33
- Label: Atlantic; SD 1698
- Producer: Eddie Harris and Richard Evans

Eddie Harris chronology
The Reason Why I'm Talking S--t (1975)	How Can You Live Like That? (1977)	I'm Tired of Driving (1978)

How Can You Live Like That? is an album by American jazz saxophonist Eddie Harris recorded in 1976 and released on the Atlantic label.

== Reception ==
Professional ratings
Review scores
Source	Rating
AllMusic	3/5 stars
The Rolling Stone Jazz Record Guide	2/5 stars

The Lincoln Journal Star said that the vocals "turn the album into a comedy event."

The AllMusic review stated: "Eddie Harris comes up with another LP full of abrupt changes of gear... Some of this music sounds a bit routine for Harris but the range of idioms is extraordinary and it was apparently recorded in just one day".

== Track listing ==
All compositions by Eddie Harris except as indicated

1. "How Can I Find Some Way to Tell You" (Harris, Bradley Bobo) – 5:33
2. "Love Is Too Much to Touch" (Harris, Yvonne Harris) – 2:55
3. "How Can You Live Like That?" – 5:32
4. "Get Down with It" (Harris, Bobo, Paul Humphrey, Ronald Muldrow) – 3:44
5. "I'd Love to Take You Home" (Sara E. Harris, Muldrow) – 3:36
6. "Come Dance With Me" – 4:22
7. "Bird of Stone" (Harris, Barbara Harmala) – 2:50
8. "Ambidextrous" – 3:42
9. "Nothing Else to Do" – 9:19

== Personnel ==
- Eddie Harris – tenor saxophone, piano, vocals
- Ronald Muldrow – guitar, guitorgan, esophagusphone
- Cedar Walton – piano (tracks 5–7 & 9)
- Bradley Bobo – bass, 6 string bass, ARP synthesizer (tracks 1–4 & 9)
- Ron Carter – bass (tracks 5–7 & 9)
- Richard Evans – Minimoog (track 2), arranger (tracks 1, 3, 5 & 8)
- Paul Humphrey – drums, electric drums (tracks 1–4, 6 & 8)
- Billy Higgins – drums (tracks 5, 7 & 9)
- Al Aarons, Oscar Brashear, Bobby Bryant, Snooky Young – trumpet (tracks 1, 3, 5 & 8)
- George Bohanon, Garnett Brown, Grover Mitchell – trombone (tracks 1, 3, 5 & 8)
- Benny Powell – bass trombone (tracks 1, 3, 5 & 8)
- Buddy Collette, Bill Green – alto saxophone (tracks 1, 3, 5 & 8)
- John Kelson, Charles Owens – tenor saxophone (tracks 1, 3, 5 & 8)
- Delbert Hill – baritone saxophone (tracks 1, 3, 5 & 8)
