= Haywood Henry =

American saxophonist (1913–1994)

- Born: Frank Haywood Henry; January 10, 1913; Birmingham, Alabama, U.S.
- Died: September 15, 1994 (aged 81)
- Genres: Jazz
- Occupation: Musician
- Instrument: Baritone saxophone

Frank Haywood Henry (January 10, 1913 – September 15, 1994) was an American jazz baritone saxophonist. In 1978 he was inducted into the Alabama Jazz Hall of Fame.

== Career ==
Born in Birmingham, Alabama, Henry began on clarinet before choosing baritone saxophone as his primary instrument. He continued to play clarinet throughout his career.

While he was a student at Alabama State Teachers College, he played with the Bama State Collegians in 1930 and became a member four years later. The Collegians became the Erskine Hawkins Orchestra when Hawkins led it. Henry was a member of the orchestra from 1934 through the 1950s.

Following his period with Hawkins, Henry worked with Tiny Grimes, Julian Dash (1951), and the Fletcher Henderson Reunion Band (1957–58), and occasionally substituted for Harry Carney in the Duke Ellington Orchestra. He played on over 1,000 rock and roll records in the 1950s and 1960s, many of them anonymously and often with Mickey Baker. In the 1960s, he played with Wilbur DeParis, Max Kaminsky, Snub Mosley, Louis Metcalf, Earl Hines (1969–71), Sy Oliver (1972–80), and the New York Jazz Repertory Company. He also worked in the orchestras of Broadway shows such as Ain't Misbehavin' in the 1970s. He participated in an Erskine Hawkins reunion ensemble in 1971 and performed into the 1980s.

Henry recorded three albums as a leader: one for Davis Records in 1957, one for Strand Records early in the 1960s, and the last for Uptown in 1983.

== Discography ==
=== As leader ===
- The Gentle Monster (Uptown, 1983)

=== As sideman ===
With James Brown

- Say It Loud I'm Black and I'm Proud (Starday King, 1969)
- Star Time (Polydor, 1991)

With Ray Charles

- Genius + Soul = Jazz (Impulse!, 1961)
- At the Club (Philips, 1966)

With Eddie Harris

- The Electrifying Eddie Harris (Atlantic, 1968)
- Plug Me In (Atlantic, 1968)
- Silver Cycles (Atlantic, 1969)

With Willis Jackson

- Soul Grabber (Prestige, 1968)
- Call of the Gators (Delmark, 1992)

With Rex Stewart

- Rendezvous with Rex (Felsted, 1958)
- Henderson Homecoming (United Artists, 1959)

With others

- Brook Benton, This Is Brook Benton (All Platinum, 1976)
- Bill Doggett, The Right Choice (After Hours, 1991)
- Charles Brown, All My Life (Bullseye Blues 1990)
- Ruth Brown, Ruth Brown (Atlantic, 1957)
- Rusty Bryant, Until It's Time for You to Go (Prestige, 1974)
- Lincoln Chase, Lincoln Chase 'n You (Paramount, 1973)
- King Curtis, Sweet Soul (ATCO, 1968)
- Aretha Franklin, Lady Soul (Atlantic, 1968)
- Earl Hines, Fatha & His Flock On Tour (MPS, 1970)
- Illinois Jacquet, Spectrum (Argo, 1965)
- Junior Mance, I Believe to My Soul (Atlantic, 1968)
- The Manhattan Transfer, Jukin' (Capitol, 1971)
- Taj Mahal, Like Never Before (Private Music, 1991)
- David "Fathead" Newman, Bigger & Better (Atlantic, 1968)
- Sy Oliver, Yes Indeed (Black and Blue, 1973)
- George Rhodes, Porgy and Bess (AAMCO 1959)
- Clark Terry, Squeeze Me! (Chiaroscuro, 1989)
- Joe Thomas and Jay McShann, Blowin' in from K.C. (Uptown, 1983)
- Steve Turre, Viewpoint (Stash, 1987)
- Jimmy Witherspoon, Goin' to Kansas City Blues with Jay McShann (RCA Victor, 1958)
