= Free Speech (album) =

Studio album by Eddie Harris
- Released: 1970
- Recorded: December 15, 1969
- Studio: Universal Studios, Chicago
- Genre: Jazz
- Length: 34:47
- Label: Atlantic; SD 1573
- Producer: Eddie Harris, Marvin Lagunoff

Eddie Harris chronology
Swiss Movement (1969)	Free Speech (1970)	Come on Down! (1970)

Free Speech is an album by American jazz saxophonist Eddie Harris recorded in 1969 and released on the Atlantic label.

Professional ratings
Review scores
Source	Rating
Allmusic	3/5 stars

== Reception ==
The Allmusic review states "Harris plays quite well as usual (he can be easily identified within a note or two) but none of his six originals on this out-of-print LP are very substantial".

== Track listing ==
All compositions by Eddie Harris except as indicated

1. "Wait Please" - 8:47
2. "Boogie Woogie Bossa Nova" - 6:18
3. "Penthology" - 2:38
4. "Bold and Black" - 4:50
5. "Things You Do" - 3:14
6. "Free Speech" (Harris, Jodie Christian, Billy Hart, Louis Spears) - 9:00

== Personnel ==
- Eddie Harris - tenor saxophone, varitone, reed trumpet
- Jodie Christian - electric piano
- Louis Spears - bass, electric bass
- Billy Hart - drums
- Felix Henry - percussion
