= Sweet Baby J'ai =

American singer

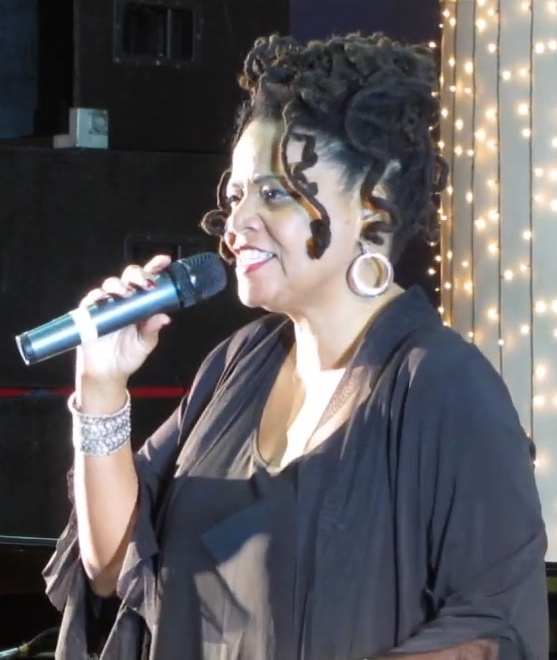
- Sweet Baby J'ai performing in October 2016

Background information
- Born: J'ai Janett Michel
- Genres: Jazz, R&B, pop, soul
- Occupations: Singer, songwriter, producer, arranger, playwright
- Instrument: Vocals
- Years active: 1985–present
- Label: Sunset Music Group
- Website: sweetbabyjai.com

J'ai J. Michel, known professionally as Sweet Baby J'ai, is an American contemporary jazz singer, songwriter, producer, arranger, and playwright.

== Background ==
She grew up in Kansas City. She wrote songs at age of five and three years later managed to enter clubs where her father played guitar. Her uncle, Vernon Gower, was a bassist for Billie Holiday and Lionel Hampton. Her cousin Michael Howell was a guitarist for Dizzy Gillespie.

== Career ==
In the 1980s she moved to Los Angeles and received lessons from Phil Moore. She performed with Teddy Edwards and Phil Upchurch.

For many years she worked pianist Nate Morgan, guitarist Ronald Muldrow, and drummer Sherman Ferguson. She has performed in the U.S., Europe, and Asia and at concert halls, festivals, and clubs such as the Walt Disney Concert Hall, Ford Amphitheater, Playboy Jazz Festival, Tokyo Concert Hall, and Casablanca's Super Dome.

Her debut album The Art of Blue (1998) was followed by Evolution (2003). Both included Morgan and Edwards. In 2005, Jazz Baby was released and J'ai worked with Janis Siegel, Freddie Cole, Rosemary Clooney and for a children's compilation jazz album. Prove It On Me (2008) is a soundtrack from Dee Jae Cox's play of the same name in which J'ai starred.

Her theatrical appearances include The Prime of Miss Jean Brodie, C'est Bon, and Spunk. She received critical acclaim for her role as Billie Holiday in the musicals Sang Sista' Sang and Voices and Beneatha, in A Raisin in the Sun. She co-wrote and starred in the play 3 Women: A Dramatic Tribute to the Divas of Jazz and wrote the film Bessie, Billie & Ruth, which was chosen as the official selection at the Pan African Film Festival and was broadcast on PBS.

== Discography ==
- 1998: The Art of Blue
- 2003: Evolution
- 2005: Jazz Baby
- 2007: Prove It On Me
- 2008: Introducing J'ai Michel
- 2014: "Black Magic Woman"
- 2015: "Straight To That Place"

=== Filmography ===
- 2001: Yo Alien (Daughters to Feed Productions)
- 2002: Divas Breaking Taboos (Traipsing Thru Films)
- 2003: Bessie, Billie Ruth (Traipsing Thru Films)
- 2008: World Stage Stories (Haikeem Productions)
