= Silver Cycles =

Studio album by Eddie Harris
- Released: 1969
- Recorded: September 4 and December 3, 1968; New York City
- Genre: Jazz
- Length: 38:29
- Label: Atlantic; SD 1517
- Producer: Arif Mardin and Joel Dorn

Eddie Harris chronology
Pourquoi L'Amérique (1968)	Silver Cycles (1969)	High Voltage (1969)

Silver Cycles is an album by American jazz saxophonist Eddie Harris recorded in 1968 and released on the Atlantic label. The album features heavy Latin jazz and postbop themes, accompanied by electronic processing.

== Reception ==
The Allmusic review states "The music is by turns swinging, touching, feverish, detached, nightmarish, and peaceful, bursting with new ideas generated from Harris' plunge into electronics. This album has been unjustly overlooked, probably because Harris was selling a lot of records and getting airplay at the time (a cardinal sin for purists), or perhaps for its free, anything-goes '60s spirit".

Professional ratings
Review scores
Source	Rating
Allmusic	4.5/5 stars

== Track listing ==
All compositions by Eddie Harris except as indicated

1. "Free at Last" – 3:15
2. "1974 Blues" – 4:22
3. "Smoke Signals" – 2:55
4. "Coltrane's View" (Jodie Christian) – 4:08
5. "I'm Gonna Leave You by Yourself" – 3:00
6. "Silver Cycles" (Harris, Melvin Jackson) – 5:50
7. "Little Bit" – 5:29
8. "Electric Ballad" – 2:54
9. "Infrapolations" – 6:36
- Recorded in New York City on September 4 (tracks 1, 2, 4, 6, 8 & 9), and December 3 (tracks 3, 5 & 7), 1968

== Personnel ==
- Eddie Harris – tenor saxophone, varitone
- Jodie Christian (tracks 1, 2, 4, 6, 8 & 9), Joe Zawinul (track 7) – piano
- Richard Davis (tracks 3, 5 & 7), Melvin Jackson (tracks 1, 2, 4, 6, 8 & 9) – bass
- Monk Montgomery – electric bass (track 7)
- Bruno Carr (tracks 1, 2 & 6–8), Billy Hart (tracks 3, 5 & 7), Richard Smith (tracks 4 & 9) – drums
- Bernie Glow (track 1), Melvin Lastie (track 2), Joe Newman (tracks 1 & 2), Ernie Royal (tracks 1 & 7), Snooky Young (tracks 2 & 7) – trumpet
- Benny Powell – trombone (tracks 1 & 2)
- Phil Bodner, (track 7), Seldon Powell (tracks 1, 2 & 7) – tenor saxophone
- Haywood Henry – baritone saxophone (tracks 2 & 7)
- Marcelino Valdez – percussion (tracks 6 & 8)
- Eileen Gilbert, Melba Moore, Valerie Simpson, Maeretha Stewart – vocals (tracks 3 & 5)
- Unidentified string section conducted by Gene Orloff (tracks 3 & 5)
