= Sounds Incredible =

Studio album by Eddie Harris
- Released: 1980
- Recorded: March 1980
- Studio: Fantasy Studios, Berkeley, CA
- Genre: Jazz
- Length: 42:02
- Label: Angelaco; AN 3002

Eddie Harris chronology
Playin' with Myself (1979)	Sounds Incredible (1980)	Steps Up (1981)

Sounds Incredible is an album by saxophonist Eddie Harris recorded in 1980 and originally released on the short-lived Angelaco label.

== Reception ==
Professional ratings
Review scores
Source	Rating
AllMusic	4/5 stars

Richard S. Ginell of AllMusic said "Starting with this LP, Eddie Harris ended his flirtations with the mass market, choosing to record mostly in a straight-ahead, bop-rooted manner for a variety of small American and European labels for the rest of his life. His electronic experimentations did not end, though, and he puts them to marvelously musical use here ... Worth seeking out".

== Track listing ==
All compositions by Eddie Harris except where noted

1. "Matchmaker" (Jerry Bock, Sheldon Harnick) – 8:37
2. "You Know It's Wrong" – 4:56
3. "Commotion" – 7:16
4. "Singing My Cares Away" (Harris, Esmond Edwards) – 9:38
5. "Remember to Smile" (James Leary) – 6:25
6. "Photographs of You" (Harris, Edwards) – 5:10

== Personnel ==
- Eddie Harris – tenor saxophone
- Smith Dobson – piano
- James Leary – bass
- Eddie Marshall – drums
