= Bossa Nova (Eddie Harris album) =

Studio album by Eddie Harris
- Released: 1963
- Recorded: November 1962; New York City
- Genre: Jazz
- Length: 35:41
- Label: Vee-Jay; LP/SR 3034
- Producer: Sid McCoy

Eddie Harris chronology
Eddie Harris Goes to the Movies (1962)	Bossa Nova (1963)	Half and Half (1963)

Bossa Nova is an album by American jazz saxophonist Eddie Harris, featuring some early compositions by Lalo Schifrin, recorded in 1962 and released on the Vee-Jay label.

== Reception ==
The Allmusic review states "far from being a casual response to a fad, this is a great record, one where Harris came to his own comfortable accommodation with the Brazilian idiom".

Professional ratings
Review scores
Source	Rating
Allmusic	4.5/5 stars

== Track listing ==
All compositions by Lalo Schifrin except as indicated

1. "Mima" - 7:39
2. "Lolita Marie" (Eddie Harris) - 4:54
3. "Cev y Mar" (Johnny Alf) - 8:29
4. "Whispering Bossa Nova" - 5:42
5. "Samba Para Dos" - 5:29
6. "Tel Eco Teco No. 2" (Nelsinado O. Magalhaes) - 3:28

== Personnel ==
- Eddie Harris - tenor saxophone
- Lalo Schifrin - piano, arranger
- Jimmy Raney - guitar
- Art Davis - bass
- Chuck Lampkin - drums
- Jack del Rio, Osvaldo Cigno - Latin percussion
- George Okamoto, Ray London - cover illustration
