= The Real Electrifying Eddie Harris =

Studio album by Eddie Harris
- Released: 1982
- Recorded: August 1982
- Studio: Sage & Sound Recording Studio, Hollywood, CA
- Genre: Jazz
- Length: 40:23
- Label: Mutt & Jeff; MJ 5018
- Producer: Eddie Harris, Joey Jefferson

Eddie Harris chronology
Steps Up (1981)	The Real Electrifying Eddie Harris (1982)	Exploration (1983)

The Real Electrifying Eddie Harris is an album by saxophonist Eddie Harris recorded in 1982 and originally released on the Mutt & Jeff label before being reissued on CD on Ubiquity Records in 1999.

== Reception ==
Professional ratings
Review scores
Source	Rating
AllMusic	4/5 stars

John Vallier of AllMusic said "The album showcases Harris' versatility, improvisational skill, and mastery of tone".

== Track listing ==
All compositions by Eddie Harris except where noted

1. "Theme in Search of a Movie" (Charles Stepney) – 7:40
2. "Listen Here" – 4:05
3. "Essence of Matter" – 5:34
4. "Deacceleration" – 6:37
5. "For Your Life" (Bill Henderson) – 9:43
6. "Let The Healing Begin" (Larry Gales) – 5:04

== Personnel ==
- Eddie Harris – tenor saxophone
- Bill Henderson – piano
- Larry Gales – bass
- Carl Burnett – drums
