= Willie Pickens =

American jazz pianist, composer, and educator

- Born: April 18, 1931; Milwaukee, Wisconsin, U.S.
- Died: December 12, 2017 (aged 86) Manhattan, New York
- Genres: Jazz
- Occupations: Musician, composer, arranger, educator
- Instrument: Piano
- Years active: 1958–2017

Willie Pickens (April 18, 1931 – December 12, 2017) was an American jazz pianist, composer, arranger, and educator.

== Early life ==
Pickens was born in Milwaukee on April 18, 1931. He studied piano formally from the age of 14. He attended Lincoln High School in Milwaukee with saxophonist Bunky Green. Pickens also studied at the Wisconsin Conservatory of Music.

== Later life and career ==
Pickens joined the army in 1951. He obtained a B.S. in music education from the University of Wisconsin–Milwaukee in 1958 and moved to Chicago in the same year.

In the early 1960s, Pickens played on saxophonist Eddie Harris' first four recordings for Vee-Jay Records. His period with Harris lasted between 1960 and 1966. Pickens taught music at public schools from 1966 until 1990. He was also a faculty member of the American Conservatory of Music between 1971 and 1987.

Pickens recorded with clarinetist Buddy DeFranco in 1977, and drummer Louis Bellson in 1994. Pickens played in drummer Elvin Jones' band between 1990 and 1997, including internationally.

According to The New Grove Dictionary of Jazz, "Pickens appeared regularly at international jazz festivals and performed at Chicago Jazz Festival almost yearly from its inception." In 1999, Pickens was part of the Chicago Jazz Festival's closing act with the Marian McPartland Trio, along with Judy Roberts and Jodie Christian. For jazz musicians in Chicago, Pickens has become "a revered mentor to younger players and a symbol of the music itself", in the words of a Chicago Tribune commentator. He also taught at Northern Illinois University's School of Music. Saxophonist Lou Donaldson once told Donald Harrison, "Willie Pickens is one of the last great bebop pianists."

Pickens died of a heart attack in Manhattan, New York, at the age of 86. His wife, Irma, died in 2015 after 55 years of marriage. A daughter, Bethany, also plays the piano professionally and has recorded with her father.

== Discography ==
An asterisk (*) indicates that the year is that of release.

=== As leader/co-leader ===
Year recorded	Title	Label	Personnel/Notes
1987	It's About Time!	Southport	Trio, with Dan Shapera (bass), Robert Shy (drums); reissued on CD with concert solo piano tracks from 1981 and 1986
1998	Jazz Christmas	Southport	Quartet, with Nicholas Payton (trumpet, flugelhorn), Larry Gray (bass), Robert Shy (drums)
2000	Ain't Misbehavin'	Concord Jazz	Duo, with Marian McPartland (piano)
2005	Mr Swing	Pony Canyon	Trio, with George Mraz (bass), Joe Farnsworth (drums); also released as Dark Eyes
2005	Jazz Spirit, Volume 1	Southport	Some tracks solo piano; some tracks duo, with Bethany Pickens (piano); other tracks include Pat Mallinger (tenor sax, alto sax), Ari Brown (tenor sax), Tito Carril (flugelhorn), Marlene Rosenberg, Rob Amster, Larry Gray (bass; separately), Kobie Watkins, Robert Shy (drums; separately)
2005	Jazz Spirit, Volume 2	Southport	As Jazz Spirit, Volume 1; differences are Pat Mallinger (alto sax), Tito Carrillo (trumpet, flugelhorn)
2010*	Just Like Me	Skiptone	Duo, with Milton Suggs (vocals)

=== As sideman ===
Year recorded	Leader	Title	Label
1961	Eddie Harris	Exodus to Jazz	Vee-Jay
1961	Eddie Harris	Mighty Like a Rose	Vee-Jay
1961	Eddie Harris	Jazz for "Breakfast at Tiffany's"	Vee-Jay
1961–62	Eddie Harris	A Study in Jazz	Vee-Jay
1963	Eddie Harris	For Bird and Bags	Exodus
1966	Bunky Green	Playin' for Keeps	Cadet
1977	Buddy DeFranco	Gone with the Wind	Storyville
1990s	Francine Griffin	The Song Bird	Delmark
1991	Elvin Jones	In Europe	Enja
1992	Elvin Jones	Going Home	Enja
1993	Elvin Jones	It Don't Mean a Thing	Enja
1993	Steve Grossman	Time to Smile	Dreyfus
1994	Louie Bellson	Salute	Chiaroscuro
1994	Ed Peterson	The Haint	Delmark
1995	Clark Terry	Top and Bottom Brass	Chiaroscuro
1997	Frank Catalano	Cut It Out	Delmark
1998	Von Freeman	75th Birthday Celebration	Half Note
1998	Von Freeman	Von & Ed	Delmark
1999	Malachi Thompson	Talking Horns	Delmark
2014*	Peter Lerner	Continuation	Origin

Main source:
