= Plug Me In (album) =

Studio album by Eddie Harris
- Released: 1968
- Recorded: March 14 & 15, 1968; New York City
- Genre: Jazz
- Length: 26:58
- Label: Atlantic; SD 1506
- Producer: Joel Dorn

Eddie Harris chronology
The Electrifying Eddie Harris (1967)	Plug Me In (1968)	Pourquoi L'Amérique (1968)

Plug Me In is an album by American jazz saxophonist Eddie Harris recorded in 1968 and released on the Atlantic label. The title is a reference to Harris's use of a Varitone device to electronically amplify and process his saxophone.

This is the album referenced in the first line of Beastie Boys' song So What'cha Want, from their 1992 album Check Your Head.

== Reception ==
The Allmusic review calls it "One of Eddie Harris's more underrated sessions... The only real fault to this enjoyable set is that the playing time is under 27 minutes". The record was arranged by another Chicago musician, Charles Stepney, who was mainly associated with Chess Records as a staff writer, arranger and producer at the time. Atlantic's Joel Dorn produced the set.

Professional ratings
Review scores
Source	Rating
Allmusic	3/5 stars

== Track listing ==
All compositions by Eddie Harris except as indicated

1. "Live Right Now" - 6:58
2. "It's Crazy" - 3:09
3. "Ballad (For My Love)" - 3:22
4. "Lovely Is Today" - 4:28
5. "Theme in Search of a T.V. Commercial" (Charles Stepney) - 4:11
6. "Winter Meeting" (Stepney) - 4:50
- Recorded in New York City on March 14 (tracks 1, 2 & 5) and March 15 (tracks 3, 4 & 6), 1968

== Personnel ==
- Eddie Harris - tenor saxophone, varitone
- Melvin Lastie, Joe Newman, Jimmy Owens - trumpet
- Garnett Brown (tracks 3, 4 & 6), Tom McIntosh (tracks 1, 2 & 5) - trombone
- Haywood Henry - baritone saxophone
- Jodie Christian - piano
- Ron Carter (tracks 3, 4 & 6), Melvin Jackson (tracks 1, 2 & 5) - bass
- Chuck Rainey - electric bass
- Richard Smith, Grady Tate - drums
