= Here Comes the Judge (Eddie Harris album) =

Studio album by Eddie Harris
- Released: 1964
- Recorded: 1964
- Genre: Jazz
- Length: 29:48
- Label: Columbia; CS 9681
- Producer: Tom Wilson

Eddie Harris chronology
Cool Sax, Warm Heart (1964)	Here Comes the Judge (1964)	Cool Sax from Hollywood to Broadway (1964)

Here Comes the Judge is an album by American jazz saxophonist Eddie Harris recorded in 1964 and released on the Columbia label.

Professional ratings
Review scores
Source	Rating
Allmusic	3/5 stars

== Track listing ==
All compositions by Eddie Harris except as indicated

1. "East End Blues" – 2:23
2. "Deep in a Dream" (Eddie De Lange, Jimmy Van Heusen) – 5:04
3. "Goldfinger" (John Barry, Leslie Bricusse, Anthony Newley) – 3:33
4. "People" (Bob Merrill, Jule Styne) – 3:02
5. "What's New?" (Johnny Burke, Bob Haggart) – 3:21
6. "Rice Pudding" – 3:12
7. "Ineffable" (Jimmy Heath) – 2:55
8. "That's Tough" – 6:18

== Personnel ==
- Eddie Harris – tenor saxophone
- Unnamed additional musicians
