= E.H. in the U.K. =

Album by Eddie Harris

Studio album by Eddie Harris
- Released: 1974
- Recorded: 1973
- Studio: Morgan, London
- Genre: Soul jazz, jazz fusion
- Length: 44:11
- Label: Atlantic; SD 1647
- Producer: Geoffrey Haslam

Eddie Harris chronology
Excursions (1966–73)	E.H. in the U.K. (1974)	Is It In (1974)

E.H. in the U.K. is an album by American jazz saxophonist Eddie Harris, recorded in England with prominent British rock musicians in 1973 and released on the Atlantic label.

== Reception ==
Professional ratings
Review scores
Source	Rating
AllMusic	2.5/5 stars
The Rolling Stone Jazz Record Guide	2/5 stars

The AllMusic review stated that "most of the results aren't too different from what Harris had been recording at home at the time, with only a hint of a rock edge. If anything, the workmanlike Brits are too much on their best behavior".

== Track listing ==
All compositions by Eddie Harris except as indicated.

1. "Baby" – 6:45
2. "Wait a Little Longer" – 4:12
3. "He's an Island Man" – 2:25
4. "I've Tried Everything" – 8:13
5. "I Waited for You" (Charles Stepney) – 5:48
6. "Conversations of Everything and Nothing" – 15:54

== Personnel ==
- Eddie Harris – tenor saxophone, varitone, trumpet, acoustic piano, vocals
- Zoot Money (tracks 1 & 2), Stevie Winwood (tracks 3–6) – electric piano
- Tony Kaye – Moog synthesizer (tracks 5 & 6)
- Jeff Beck (tracks 3 & 4), Neil Hubbard (tracks 1 & 2), Albert Lee – electric guitar
- Chris Squire (tracks 5 & 6), Raymond Burrell (tracks 1–3), Rick Grech (track 4) – electric bass
- Ian Paice (tracks 3 & 4), Alan White (tracks 1, 2, 5 & 6) – drums
- Loughty Amao – congas (tracks 3 & 4)

Technical

- Nesuhi Ertegun – executive producer
- Roger Quested – recording engineer
- Bob Defrin – art direction
