= Pourquoi L'Amérique =

Soundtrack album by Eddie Harris
- Released: 1970
- Recorded: 1968; New York City
- Genre: Jazz
- Length: 38:39
- Label: AZ; STEC LP 68
- Producer: Ahmet Ertegun and Joel Dorn

Eddie Harris chronology
Plug Me In (1968)	Pourquoi L'Amérique (1970)	Silver Cycles (1968)

Pourquoi L'Amérique (translation: Why America) is a soundtrack album by American jazz saxophonist Eddie Harris recorded in 1968 for the documentary of the same name on American history from 1917 to 1939 by French film director Frédéric Rossif and released on the French AZ label.

== Track listing ==
All compositions by Eddie Harris except as indicated

1. "Pourquoi L'Amérique" – 3:30
2. "La Terre" – 5:00
3. "Odeur de la Poudre" – 3:45
4. "Musique pour un Massacre" – 4:04
5. "Mort d'un Ennemi Public" – 2:40
6. "Pourquoi L'Amérique (Deuxième Version)" – 1:51
7. "New Deal" – 3:39
8. "Prelude to Pearl Harbor" – 1:50
9. "Civilisation de Consommation" – 2:00
10. "Grèves Sauvages" – 1:40
11. "Parfois la Guerre" – 1:55
12. "Raisins de la Colère" – 3:30
13. Pourquoi L'Amérique (Troisième Version)" – 3:15

== Personnel ==
- Eddie Harris – tenor saxophone, varitone
- Jodie Christian – piano
- Melvin Jackson – bass
- Billy Hart – drums
