= Instant Death (album) =

Studio album by Eddie Harris
- Released: 1972
- Recorded: December 7, 1971
- Studio: Brunswick, Chicago
- Genre: Jazz
- Length: 36:24
- Label: Atlantic; SD 1611
- Producer: Eddie Harris, Marvin Lagunoff

Eddie Harris chronology
Second Movement (1971)	Instant Death (1972)	Eddie Harris Sings the Blues (1972)

Instant Death is an album by American jazz saxophonist Eddie Harris, recorded in 1971 and released on the Atlantic label.

== Reception ==
Professional ratings
Review scores
Source	Rating
AllMusic	4.5/5 stars
The Penguin Guide to Jazz Recordings	3/4 stars

The AllMusic review called the album "one of Eddie Harris's stronger Atlantic albums of the 1970s".

== Track listing ==
All compositions by Eddie Harris except as indicated

1. "Instant Death" - 5:46
2. "Little Wes" (Ronald Muldrow) - 7:30
3. "Zambezi Dance" (Harris, Muldrow, Muhal Richard Abrams, Master Henry Gibson, Billy James) - 4:09
4. "Summer's on Its Way" - 7:46
5. "Nightcap" - 5:08
6. "Superfluous" - 3:18
7. "Tampion" - 2:47

== Personnel ==
- Eddie Harris - tenor saxophone, varitone, reed trumpet, cowbell, shaker, horn vocals
- Muhal Richard Abrams - electric piano, African whistle
- Ronald Muldrow - electric guitar
- Rufus Reid - bass, electric bass
- Billy James - drums
- Master Henry Gibson - congas, African talking drum
