= Cool Sax from Hollywood to Broadway =

Studio album by Eddie Harris
- Released: 1964
- Recorded: September 22–24, 1964; New York City
- Genre: Jazz
- Length: 35:41
- Label: Columbia; CL 2295 / CS 9095
- Producer: Tom Wilson

Eddie Harris chronology
Here Comes the Judge (1964)	Cool Sax from Hollywood to Broadway (1964)	The In Sound (1965)

Cool Sax from Hollywood to Broadway is an album by American jazz saxophonist Eddie Harris recorded in 1964 and released on the Columbia label.

== Reception ==
The Allmusic review states "This hard-to-find LP has some good music but is not essential".

Professional ratings
Review scores
Source	Rating
Allmusic	3/5 stars

== Track listing ==
All compositions by Eddie Harris except as indicated

1. "People" (Bob Merrill, Jule Styne) – 3:00
2. "From Russia With Love" (Lionel Bart) – 1:58
3. "Topkapi" (Manos Hadjidakis) – 4:56
4. "Days of Wine and Roses" (Henry Mancini, Johnny Mercer) – 5:59
5. "Groovy Movies" – 3:26
6. "Who Can I Turn To (When Nobody Needs Me)" (Leslie Bricusse, Anthony Newley) – 3:07
7. "Theme from "Malamondo"" (Ennio Morricone) – 3:27
8. "Sarah's Theme" – 7:14
9. "On Green Dolphin Street" (Bronisław Kaper, Ned Washington) – 2:36
10. "Night Must Fall" – 3:23
11. "I've Grown Accustomed to Her Face" (Alan Jay Lerner, Frederick Loewe) – 3:42
12. "Little Lo Lo" – 2:57

== Personnel ==
- Eddie Harris – tenor saxophone
- Cedar Walton – piano (1, 3–12)
- Kenny Burrell – guitar (2, 7)
- Bob Cranshaw – bass (1, 3–12)
- Billy Brooks – drums (1, 3–12)
