= Live at Newport (Eddie Harris album) =

Live album by Eddie Harris
- Released: 1970
- Recorded: July 12, 1970; Newport Jazz Festival, Newport, Rhode Island
- Genre: Jazz
- Length: 38:29
- Label: Atlantic; SD 1595
- Producer: Joel Dorn, Eddie Harris and Marvin Lagunoff

Eddie Harris chronology
Come on Down! (1970)	Live at Newport (1970)	Second Movement (1971)

Live at Newport is a live album by American jazz saxophonist Eddie Harris recorded at the Newport Jazz Festival in 1970 and released on the Atlantic label.

== Reception ==
Professional ratings
Review scores
Source	Rating
Allmusic	3/5 stars

The Allmusic review stated "These advanced tracks didn't win him any points with the critics of the time but hindsight reveals that harmonically as well as electronically, Harris was ahead of most of the pack".

== Track listing ==
All compositions by Eddie Harris except as indicated

1. "Children's Song" – 6:13
2. "Carry on Brother" – 5:12
3. "Don't You Know the Future's in Space" – 8:05
4. "Silent Majority" (Gene McDaniels) – 5:47
5. "Walk Soft" – 4:15
6. "South Side" – 8:57

== Personnel ==
- Eddie Harris – tenor saxophone, varitone
- Jodie Christian – piano, electric piano
- Louis Spears – bass
- Robert Crowder – drums
- Eugene McDaniels – vocals (track 4)
