= Playin' with Myself =

Studio album by Eddie Harris
- Released: March 1980
- Recorded: 1979
- Studio: Fantasy, Berkeley, CA
- Genre: Jazz
- Length: 50:28
- Label: RCA; AFL1-3402
- Producer: Eddie Harris

Eddie Harris chronology
I'm Tired of Driving (1978)	Playin' with Myself (1980)	Sounds Incredible (1980)

Playin' with Myself is a solo album by saxophonist/pianist Eddie Harris, recorded in 1979 and released on the RCA label.

== Reception ==
Professional ratings
Review scores
Source	Rating
AllMusic	3/5 stars
DownBeat	3/5 stars

The Bay State Banner noted that "gone are the feeble attempts at humor and funk, and instead Harris attacks his tenor sax with some vigor and emotion."

Richard S. Ginell of AllMusic wrote: "On his second and last RCA LP, Harris strips everything down to just tenor sax and acoustic grand piano -- with himself overdubbing on both -- in an austere, uncompromising series of sessions in several studios. A bold move, particularly for RCA (which probably didn't give a damn anymore), one that few players would dare attempt and fewer could pull off. For Harris, this is only a partial success; some tracks are wandering and anarchic, others are quite musical and one in particular, the title track, actually swings quite well without a rhythm section".

== Track listing ==
All compositions by Eddie Harris

1. "Playin' with Myself" – 4:40
2. "Freedom Jazz Dance" – 3:53
3. "Vextious Progressions" – 4:35
4. "There Is No Time" – 4:46
5. "Trane's In" – 6:55
6. "Plain Old Rhythm" – 5:45
7. "What" – 10:20
8. "Intransit" – 7:53
9. "I Heard That" – 1:41

== Personnel ==
- Eddie Harris – tenor saxophone, piano
