= Burgess Gardner =

American musician (1936–2021)

Burgess LaMarr Gardner (April 12, 1936 – November 20, 2021) was an American jazz musician, educator, and composer.

He played the trumpet with jazz legends such as Count Basie, Horace Silver, and Louie Bellson, Ray Charles; as of 2003, the Burgess Gardner Orchestra performed regularly in Chicago. He was particularly noted for hard bop as a music form.

He died on November 20, 2021, at the age of 85.

== Discography ==
With Eddie Harris

- Eddie Harris Sings the Blues (Atlantic, 1972)

Solo:-

- Music Year 2000 (MCA, 1983)

=== Solo albums ===
Burgess Gardner's first solo album was released in the Spring of 1983. Entitled Music Year 2000 it was released in both the US and UK on MCA Records (Cat No: MCA 5399). To date, there has been no release on CD or download formats.

=== Track listing ===
Title	Length
Side one
"Little Bellflower"	4:25
"Gemstone"	4:29
"Nice 'n' Greasy"	5:35
"Crazy About You"	4:11
Side two
"My Pleasure"	4:53
"Shoot Your Best Shot"	4:50
"Sheson"	4:43
"Limited Edition"	6:11

Singles released: Shoot Your Best Shot / Limited Edition (12" White Label UK Promo only); Nice 'n' Greasy (7" and 12" Single, US and UK - identical versions to the album).

Joining Burgess on the songwriting team was Al Perkins, Kevin McCord, Roslyn Lee, Vee Allen, Jack Hall, Jackie Myers, and long time MCA recording artist Al Hudson of One Way. The album was recorded at United Studio, Detroit, Michigan. Produced by Roy Glover and Al Perkins, the project also included experienced engineer Mike Iacopelli. Following the recording sessions in Detroit, the tapes were handed over to Kevin Gray at MCA's Whitney Recording Studios in Glendale, California for mastering and track listing - the track sequence is thought to have been decided in Detroit. The final result was absolutely incredible. At the time of recording and the release of the finished album, Burgess Gardner was working as a Jazz tutor at the California State University, Fullerton.

Music Year 2000 entered the UK's Jazz Fusion Few Chart at Number 1 on 19 April 1983 (Blues and Soul magazine Edition 379), joining the ranks of several acclaimed albums of the day including Lonnie Liston Smith's Dreams of Tomorrow and Earl Klugh's Low Ride. In addition, Burgess's album stood shoulder to shoulder with Joe Sample"s The Hunter also on MCA and riding high in the US and UK. Burgess Gardner's first solo album also did well in the US and UK Jazz Charts and the album registered on both US and UK Soul Album charts thanks to the track Shoot Your Best Shot which was being played heavily in clubs on both sides of the Atlantic.

Shoot Your Best Shot was premiered in the UK as the album's most commercial offering by Robbie Vincent on his Radio London Show in early April when the album was still on pre-release white label promo, with MCA making a decision to put it out on a UK 12" white label promo single backed with Limited Edition. The official single released by MCA was Nice 'n' Greasy. Jazz Fusion DJs preferred the album's outstanding opener Little Bellflower which remained on many playlists at specialist clubs, bars, and radio programmes for several months.
