= Eddie Harris Goes to the Movies =

Studio album by Eddie Harris
- Released: 1962
- Recorded: 1962
- Genre: Jazz
- Length: 27:11
- Label: Vee-Jay; VJLP 3031

Eddie Harris chronology
A Study in Jazz (1962)	Eddie Harris Goes to the Movies (1962)	Bossa Nova (1962)

Eddie Harris Goes to the Movies is the fifth album by American jazz saxophonist Eddie Harris. Recorded in 1962 and released on the Vee-Jay label the album features Harris performing orchestral arrangements of many motion picture themes of the era.

== Reception ==
The Allmusic review states "With the wine-and-candlelight string backdrops of Dick Marx throwing velvet drapery in back of a lush tenor sax, this LP oozes the mood-music formula so favored by pop record producers in mid-century America... A period piece, but seductive if you're in the mood".

Professional ratings
Review scores
Source	Rating
Allmusic	3/5 stars

== Track listing ==
1. "Laura" (Johnny Mercer, David Raksin) - 3:08
2. "Be My Love" (Nicholas Brodszky, Sammy Cahn) - 2:16
3. "Gone With the Wind" (Herb Magidson, Allie Wrubel) - 2:34
4. "Secret Love" (Sammy Fain, Paul Francis Webster) - 2:13
5. "These Foolish Things" (Harry Link, Holt Marvell, Jack Strachey) - 3:02
6. "Tonight" (Leonard Bernstein, Stephen Sondheim) - 2:18
7. "The More I See You" (Mack Gordon, Harry Warren) - 3:31
8. "Green Dolphin Street" (Bronisław Kaper, Ned Washington) - 2:32
9. "Guess I'll Hang My Tears Out to Dry" (Cahn, Jule Styne) - 2:50
10. "Moonglow" (Eddie DeLange, Will Hudson, Irving Mills) - 2:47

== Personnel ==
- Eddie Harris - tenor saxophone
- Unnamed Orchestra conducted by Dick Marx
