= I'm Tired of Driving =

Studio album by Eddie Harris
- Released: 1978
- Recorded: 1978
- Studio: P.S., Chicago, IL
- Genre: Jazz
- Length: 39:19
- Label: RCA; PL 12942
- Producer: Richard Evans

Eddie Harris chronology
How Can You Live Like That? (1976)	I'm Tired of Driving (1978)	Playin' with Myself (1979)

I'm Tired of Driving is an album by saxophonist/pianist Eddie Harris, recorded in 1978 and released on the RCA label.

== Reception ==
Professional ratings
Review scores
Source	Rating
AllMusic	3/5 stars

The Philadelphia Daily News wrote that "Harris sings in an outrageous falsetto and a bathroom baritone." Newsday deemed the album a "rather unfocused amalgam of rhythm and blues, gospel, bossa nova and disco drone."

Richard S. Ginell of AllMusic called the album a "somewhat tepid brew of mostly R&B/slanted pop/jazz music with a whiff of disco now and then, utilizing Harris' array of straight and electronically-altered vocals, lots of acoustic tenor sax, and some piano," and said that, "although EH's personal sax sound is always recognizable, and he is more crisply recorded than on any of his Atlantic records, the LP's anonymous, pre-packaged '70s feeling drains much of Harris' personality right out of the studio."

== Track listing ==
All compositions by Eddie Harris except where noted.

1. "Two Times Two Equals Love" (Harris, Y. Harris) – 5:55
2. "You Are the One" (Harris, L. Harris) – 3:57
3. "Songbird" (Dave Wolfert, Steve Nelson) – 4:05
4. "I'm Tired of Driving" (Harris, S. Harris) – 4:50
5. "The Loneliest Monk" – 3:58
6. "Theme for the Foxy Ladies" (Richard Evans) – 3:39
7. "You Stole My Heart" (Harris, S., L, & Y. Harris) – 3:18
8. "There Was a Time" – 5:02
9. "What's Wrong with the World Today" – 4:35

== Personnel ==
- Eddie Harris – varitone, tenor saxophone, piano
- Danny Leake – guitar
- Denzil Miller – keyboards
- Larry Ball – bass
- Steve Cobb, Morris Jennings (track 6) – drums
- Russell Iverson – trumpet
- Robert Lewis – cornet
- Kenneth Brass – flugelhorn
- John Avant, Morris Ellis – trombone
- John William Haynor – bass trombone
- Murray Watson, Steele Seals – saxophones
- S. A. Bobrov, Joel Smirnoff, Arnold Roth, Frank Borgognone, Roger Moulton, E. Zlatoff-Mirsky, Elliot Golub, George Palermo – violin
- Martin Abrams, Arnold Sklar – viola
- Karl B. Fruh, Kenneth Slowik – cello
- Cinnamon: Bernadene Davis, Francine Smith, Jo Ann Brown-El – backing vocals
