= The Reason Why I'm Talking S--t =

The Reason Why I'm Talking S—t

Live album by Eddie Harris
- Released: 1976
- Recorded: 1975
- Venue: Longhorn Restaurant Cafe, Minneapolis, Amazing Grace Night Club, Evanston, Illinois, Teddy's Lounge, Milwaukee and Howard Rumsey's Concert by the Sea, Redondo Beach, California
- Genre: Jazz
- Length: 47:57
- Label: Atlantic; SD 18165
- Producer: Eddie Harris

Eddie Harris chronology
That Is Why You're Overweight (1975)	The Reason Why I'm Talking S—t (1976)	How Can You Live Like That? (1976)

The Reason Why I'm Talking S—t is an album by American jazz saxophonist Eddie Harris recorded in 1975 and released on the Atlantic label.

== Reception ==
Professional ratings
Review scores
Source	Rating
Allmusic	2/5 stars

The Allmusic review stated "One wonders who talked Atlantic Records into issuing this offbeat LP, the jazz world's equivalent of the Elvis talking album. It's a compilation of Eddie Harris comedy monologues before sets at nightclubs in Minneapolis, Evanston, Milwaukee and Redondo Beach, with plenty of sex to go around. Actually, Eddie is pretty droll in his X-rated way, telling the audience what is really on their minds at nightclubs... Hard to find – which is just as well".

== Track listing ==
All compositions by Eddie Harris except as indicated

1. "People Getting Ready to Go See Eddie Harris" – 8:16
2. "What I'm Thinking Before I Start Playing" – 4:49
3. "Are There Any Questions" – 10:23
4. "The Reason Why I'm Talking" – 0:11
5. "The Next Band – Music: Brother Soul, Pt. 1 2:54
6. "Ain't Shit Happening – Music: Brother Soul, Pt. 2" – 4:04
7. "Projects and High Rises – Music: Bee Bump" – 4:52
8. "Singing and Straining – Music: The Aftermath" – 6:47
9. "People Enjoying Themselves" – 4:02
10. "Eddie Atlantic" – 1:39

== Personnel ==
- Eddie Harris – tenor saxophone, vocals
- Ronald Muldrow – guitar
- Odell Brown – organ
- Bradley Bobo – bass
- Paul Humphrey – drums
- Calvin Barnes – percussion
