= Eddie Harris Sings the Blues =

Album by Eddie Harris

Studio album by Eddie Harris
- Released: 1972
- Recorded: July 25, 1972
- Studio: Brunswick Recording Studios, Chicago
- Genre: Jazz
- Length: 41:25
- Label: Atlantic; SD 1625
- Producer: Marvin Lagunoff, Eddie Harris

Eddie Harris chronology
| Instant Death (1971) | Eddie Harris Sings the Blues (1972) | Excursions (1966-73) |

Eddie Harris Sings the Blues is an album by American jazz saxophonist Eddie Harris recorded in 1972 and released on the Atlantic label.

== Reception ==
Professional ratings
Review scores
| Source | Rating |
|---|---|
| Allmusic | 2/5 stars |

The Allmusic review called the album "Another fascinating installment in Harris' long Atlantic period".

== Track listing ==
All compositions by Eddie Harris except as indicated

1. "Please Let Me Go" - 7:10
2. "Ten Minutes to Four" - 4:57
3. "A Child Is Born" (Thad Jones) - 3:50
4. "Walk With Me" - 4:20
5. "Eddie Sings the Blues" - 12:30
6. "Giant Steps" (John Coltrane) - 8:38

== Personnel ==
- Eddie Harris - tenor saxophone, varitone
- Muhal Richard Abrams - electric piano
- Ronald Muldrow - electric guitar (tracks 1, 2 & 4–6)
- Rufus Reid - bass, electric bass (tracks 1, 2 & 4–6)
- Billy James - drums, boobam (tracks 1, 2 & 4–6)
- Burgess Gardner, Frank Gordon - trumpet (tracks 4 & 5)
- Steve Galloway - trombone (tracks 4 & 5)
- Willie Henderson - baritone saxophone (tracks 4 & 5)
- Edmund Lee Bauer, Sol Bobrov, E. Zlatoff Mirsky - violin (tracks 4 & 5)
- Bruce K. Hayden, Harold K. Kupper - viola (tracks 4 & 5)
- Karl B. Fruh - cello (tracks 4 & 5)
- Andre Fischer - drums (track 4)
- Marshall Thompson - percussion (track 4 & 6)
- Vivian Harrell, Marilyn Haywood, Mary Ann Stewart - backing vocals
- Richard Evans - arranger (tracks 1, 4 & 5)
