= Mighty Like a Rose (Eddie Harris album) =

Studio album by Eddie Harris
- Released: 1961
- Recorded: April 14, 1961
- Genre: Jazz
- Length: 31:00
- Label: Vee-Jay; VJLP 3025

Eddie Harris chronology
Exodus to Jazz (1961)	Mighty Like a Rose (1961)	Jazz for "Breakfast at Tiffany's" (1961)

Mighty Like a Rose is the second album by American jazz saxophonist Eddie Harris recorded in 1961 and released on the Vee-Jay label.

== Reception ==
The Allmusic review states "Harris' playing strikes a balance between cool bop and straightforward soul-jazz, though it's possible to hear the influence of Detroiter Yusef Lateef beginning to creep in. It's all well-executed, and Harris' command of the highest ranges of his instrument is as lovely as ever, making this date worthwhile for anyone who loved the sound of Exodus to Jazz".

Professional ratings
Review scores
Source	Rating
Allmusic	4/5 stars

== Track listing ==
All compositions by Eddie Harris except as indicated

1. "My Buddy" (Walter Donaldson, Gus Kahn) - 5:33
2. "Willow Weep for Me" (Ann Ronell) - 3:49
3. "Spartacus" (Alex North) - 4:35
4. "Mighty Like a Rose" (Frank Lebby Stanton, Ethelbert Nevin) - 2:06
5. "God Bless the Child" (Billie Holiday, Arthur Herzog, Jr.) - 3:48
6. "Sally T." - 3:34
7. "Fontessa" (John Lewis) - 5:19
8. "There Is No Time" - 2:16

== Personnel ==
- Eddie Harris - tenor saxophone
- Willie Pickens - piano
- Joe Diorio - guitar
- Bill Yancey - bass
- Harold Jones - drums
