= Steps Up =

Studio album by Eddie Harris Quartet
- Released: 1981
- Recorded: February 20, 1981
- Studio: Sweet Silence Studios, Copenhagen Denmark
- Genre: Jazz
- Length: 51:11
- Label: SteepleChase; SCS 1151
- Producer: Nils Winther

Eddie Harris chronology
Sounds Incredible (1980)	Steps Up (1981)	The Real Electrifying Eddie Harris (1982)

Steps Up is an album by saxophonist Eddie Harris recorded in 1981 and released on the Danish label, SteepleChase.

Professional ratings
Review scores
Source	Rating
AllMusic	3/5 stars

== Track listing ==
All compositions by Eddie Harris except where noted

1. "Steps Up" – 5:13
2. "Scandia Skies" (Kenny Dorham) – 5:25
3. "Misty Thursday" (Duke Jordan) – 5:08
4. "Freedom Jazz Dance" – 9:45
5. "Encirclement" – 8:46
6. "If I Did – Would You?" (Jordan) – 6:45
7. "Blues at SteepleChase" – 9:56
8. "Scandia Skies #2" (Dorham) – 5:40 Additional track on CD

== Personnel ==
- Eddie Harris – tenor saxophone
- Tete Montoliu – piano
- Bo Stief – bass
- Norman Fearrington – drums
