= Jazz for "Breakfast at Tiffany's" =

Studio album by Eddie Harris
- Released: 1961
- Recorded: 1961; Chicago
- Genre: Jazz
- Label: Vee-Jay; VJLP 3027

Eddie Harris chronology
Mighty Like a Rose (1961)	Jazz for "Breakfast at Tiffany's" (1961)	A Study in Jazz (1962)

Jazz for "Breakfast at Tiffany's" is the third album by American jazz saxophonist Eddie Harris recorded in 1961, featuring a jazz interpretation of Henry Mancini's score for Breakfast at Tiffany's, and released on the Vee-Jay label.

== Reception ==
The Allmusic review states "although Harris comes up with plenty of fresh ideas, he also never leaves the melody far behind".

Professional ratings
Review scores
Source	Rating
Allmusic	4/5 stars

== Track listing ==
All compositions by Henry Mancini except as indicated

1. "Moon River" (Henry Mancini, Johnny Mercer) - 5:54
2. "Something for a Cat" - 2:18
3. "Sally's Tomato" - 1:11
4. "Mr. Yunioshi" - 3:21
5. "The Big Blow Out" - 4:35
6. "Hub Caps and Tail Lights" - 2:19
7. "Breakfast at Tiffany's" - 5:00
8. "Latin Go Lightly" - 1:51
9. "Holly" - 2:26
10. "Loose Caboose" - 1:39
11. "The Big Heist" - 3:07

== Personnel ==
- Eddie Harris - tenor saxophone
- Jon Avant - trombone
- Charles Stepney - vibraphone
- Willie Pickens - piano
- Joe Diorio - guitar
- Donald Garrett - bass
- Earl Thomas - drums
