= The Tender Storm =

Studio album by Eddie Harris
- Released: 1966
- Recorded: March 8 and September 19, 1966; New York City
- Genre: Jazz
- Length: 37:20
- Label: Atlantic; SD 1478
- Producer: Nesuhi Ertegun

Eddie Harris chronology
Mean Greens (1966)	The Tender Storm (1966)	The Electrifying Eddie Harris (1967)

The Tender Storm is an album by American jazz saxophonist Eddie Harris recorded in 1966 and released on the Atlantic label.

== Reception ==
The Allmusic review states "In a sense, this LP was really the calm before the storm, the album where Eddie Harris unveiled some new wrinkles in his act that would explode on the very next album Electrifying, while hewing tightly to a standard acoustic quartet format. Here he starts to use the Varitone amplified saxophone, albeit very discreetly, as he sticks mostly to the doubled octave effects for a suave tone that allows for some slippery swinging".

Professional ratings
Review scores
Source	Rating
Allmusic	3/5 stars

== Track listing ==
All compositions by Eddie Harris except as indicated

1. "When a Man Loves a Woman" (Calvin Lewis, Andrew Wright) - 6:16
2. "My Funny Valentine" (Lorenz Hart, Richard Rodgers) - 6:02
3. "Tender Storm" - 5:31
4. "On a Clear Day (You Can See Forever)" (Burton Lane, Alan Jay Lerner) - 7:09
5. "A Nightingale Sang in Berkeley Square" (Eric Maschwitz, Manning Sherwin) - 4:27
6. "If Ever I Would Leave You" (Lerner, Frederick Loewe) - 7:55
- Recorded in New York City on March 8 (track 5), and September 19 (tracks 1–4 & 6), 1966

== Personnel ==
- Eddie Harris - tenor saxophone, varitone
- Ray Codrington - trumpet (track 5)
- Cedar Walton - piano
- Ron Carter - bass
- Billy Higgins (track 5), Bobby Thomas (tracks 1–4 & 6) - drums
