= Come On Down! (Eddie Harris album) =

Studio album by Eddie Harris
- Released: 1970
- Recorded: March 3, 1970
- Studio: Criteria Studios, Miami, Florida
- Genre: Jazz
- Length: 38:00
- Label: Atlantic; SD 1554
- Producer: Tom Dowd

Eddie Harris chronology
Free Speech (1969)	Come On Down! (1970)	Live at Newport (1970)

Come On Down! is an album by American jazz saxophonist Eddie Harris recorded in 1970 and released on the Atlantic label.

== Reception ==
Professional ratings
Review scores
Source	Rating
Allmusic	4/5 stars

The Allmusic review called the album "a romping soul/jazz/rock session... a bit overloaded on the electric guitar side, but invigorating".

Though uncredited, Hot Chocolate's 1971 hit single "You Could Have Been a Lady" borrows heavily from album closer and 1970 single "Why Don't You Quit", lifting its entire melody and other elements.

== Track listing ==
All compositions by Eddie Harris except where noted.

1. "Don't You Know Your Future's in Space" - 5:29
2. "Live Right Now" - 8:23
3. "Really" - 4:35
4. "Nowhere to Go" - 5:36
5. "Fooltish" (Sonny Phillips) - 7:10
6. "Why Don't You Quit" - 6:47

== Personnel ==
- Eddie Harris - tenor saxophone, varitone
- Ira Sullivan - trumpet
- Dave Crawford - piano
- Billy Carter - organ
- Cornell Dupree, Jimmy O'Rourke (tracks 1, 2 & 4–6), Joe Diorio (track 3) - guitar
- Donald "Duck" Dunn - electric bass
- Tubby Ziegler - drums
