= A Study in Jazz =

Studio album by Eddie Harris
- Released: 1962
- Recorded: 1961–62
- Genre: Jazz
- Length: 34:09
- Label: Vee-Jay; VJLP 3028
- Producer: Sid McCoy

Eddie Harris chronology
Jazz for "Breakfast at Tiffany's" (1961)	A Study in Jazz (1962)	Eddie Harris Goes to the Movies (1962)

Professional ratings
Review scores
Source	Rating
AllMusic	3/5 stars
DownBeat	3/5 stars

A Study in Jazz is the fourth album by American jazz saxophonist Eddie Harris, and the first to feature his compositions predominantly, recorded in 1962 and released on the Vee-Jay label.

== Track listing ==
All compositions by Eddie Harris except as indicated

1. "No One" - 3:45
2. "Dancing Bull" - 4:15
3. "Cuttin' Out" - 3:52
4. "Down" - 4:55
5. "Fantastic Waltz" - 4:41
6. "Just Friends" (John Klenner, Sam M. Lewis) - 4:28
7. "Olifant Gesang" - 8:13

== Personnel ==
- Eddie Harris - tenor saxophone
- Willie Pickens - piano
- Joe Diorio - (tracks 2–7), Roland Faulkner (track 1) - guitar
- Richard Evans (tracks 6 & 7), Donald Garrett (track 5), Melvin Jackson (tracks 1–4) - bass
- Harold Jones (tracks 1, 3 & 4), Earl Thomas (track 5), Marshall Thompson (tracks 2, 6 & 7) - drums
- Jon Avant - trombone (track 5)
- Charles Stepney - vibraphone (track 5)
