= Cool Sax, Warm Heart =

Studio album by Eddie Harris
- Released: 1964
- Recorded: January 15 and 16, 1964; New York City
- Genre: Jazz
- Length: 35:41
- Label: Columbia; CL 3034
- Producer: Tom Wilson

Eddie Harris chronology
Half and Half (1963)	Cool Sax, Warm Heart (1964)	Here Comes the Judge (1964)

Cool Sax, Warm Heart is an album by American jazz saxophonist Eddie Harris, recorded in 1964 and released on the Columbia label.

== Reception ==
The AllMusic review states that "some enjoyable moments, but for the most part it's mainly generic. Stick with his Atlantic material instead".

Professional ratings
Review scores
Source	Rating
AllMusic	2.5/5 stars
The Rolling Stone Jazz Record Guide	2/5 stars

== Track listing ==
All compositions by Eddie Harris except as indicated

1. "Chicago Serenade" – 2:58
2. "Since I Fell for You" (Buddy Johnson) – 3:54
3. "Stum Stang" – 3:03
4. "Django's Castle" (Django Reinhardt) – 2:23
5. "More Soul, Than Soulful" – 4:24
6. "Everything Happens to Me" (Tom Adair, Matt Dennis) – 2:47
7. "But Not for Me" (George Gershwin, Ira Gershwin) – 4:26
8. "Brother Ed" – 7:01
9. "Hip Hoppin'" – 2:36

== Personnel ==
- Eddie Harris – tenor saxophone
- Wynton Kelly – piano (tracks 1, 2, 6 & 7)
- Warren Stephens – guitar
- Melvin Jackson – bass
- Bucky Taylor – drums
- The Malcom Dodds Singers – vocals
- Other unidentified musicians
- Tom Wilson – producer
