= Mean Greens =

Studio album by Eddie Harris
- Released: 1966
- Recorded: March 8 & 9 and June 7, 1966; New York City
- Genre: Jazz
- Length: 39:18
- Label: Atlantic; SD 1453
- Producer: Nesuhi Ertegun

Eddie Harris chronology
The In Sound (1965)	Mean Greens (1966)	The Tender Storm (1967)

Mean Greens is an album by American jazz saxophonist Eddie Harris recorded in 1966 and released on the Atlantic label.

== Reception ==
The AllMusic review states "Eddie Harris' trademark chops and versatility are well showcased on this respectable follow up to Harris' excellent Atlantic debut, The In Sound. Mean Greens doesn't have a signature piece, like The In Sound's "Freedom Jazz Dance," but the program of mostly Harris originals is a satisfying set based around two groups".

Professional ratings
Review scores
Source	Rating
Allmusic	3/5 stars

== Track listing ==
All compositions by Eddie Harris except as indicated

1. "Mean Greens" - 7:27
2. "It Was a Very Good Year" (Ervin Drake) - 5:08
3. "Without You" - 3:03
4. "Yeah Yeah Yeah" - 5:12
5. "Listen Here" - 3:37
6. "Blues in the Basement" - 8:07
7. "Goin' Home" - 6:44
- Recorded in New York City on March 8, 1966 (track 1), March 9, 1966 (tracks 2–4) and June 7, 1966 (tracks 5–7)

== Personnel ==
- Eddie Harris - tenor saxophone, electric piano
- Ray Codrington - trumpet, percussion (tracks 1, 4–6)
- Cedar Walton - piano (tracks 1–4)
- Sonny Phillips - organ (tracks 5–7)
- Ron Carter (tracks 1–4), Melvin Jackson (tracks 5–7) - bass
- Billy Higgins (tracks 1–4), Bucky Taylor (tracks 5–7) - drums
- Ray Barretto - congas, bongos (tracks 5–7)
