= Exodus to Jazz =

Album by Eddie Harris

Studio album by Eddie Harris
- Released: 1961
- Recorded: January 17, 1961
- Studio: Universal (Chicago)
- Genre: Jazz
- Length: 34:43
- Label: Vee-Jay; VJLP 3016
- Producer: Sid McCoy

Eddie Harris chronology
Exodus to Jazz (1961)	Mighty Like a Rose (1961)

Exodus to Jazz is the debut album by American jazz saxophonist Eddie Harris recorded in 1961 and released on the Vee-Jay label.

== Reception ==
The Allmusic review states "Exodus to Jazz is full of concise, easy-swinging grooves that maintain the appealing quality of the strikingly reimagined title track (particularly Harris' four originals). Far removed from his later, funkier days, Harris plays a cool-toned tenor who owes his biggest debt to Stan Getz's bop recordings, though there are touches of soul-jazz as well... Exodus to Jazz paved the way for numerous other crossover successes during the '60s (many in the soul-jazz realm), and while that may not be a credibility-boosting trend to start, the music still speaks for itself".

Professional ratings
Review scores
Source	Rating
Allmusic	5/5 stars

== Track listing ==
All compositions by Eddie Harris except as indicated

1. "Exodus" (Ernest Gold) - 6:38
2. "Alicia" - 3:39
3. "Gone Home" - 2:53
4. "A.T.C." - 5:31
5. "A.M. Blues" (Willie Pickens) - 2:45
6. "Little Girl Blue" (Lorenz Hart, Richard Rodgers) - 3:21
7. "Velocity" - 5:08
8. "W.P." (Pickens) - 4:31

== Personnel ==
- Eddie Harris - tenor saxophone
- Willie Pickens - piano
- Joe Diorio - guitar
- Bill Yancey - bass
- Harold Jones - drums
- Barbara Gardner - liner notes
