= The In Sound (Eddie Harris album) =

Studio album by Eddie Harris
- Released: 1966
- Recorded: August 9 & 30, 1965; New York City
- Genre: Jazz
- Length: 36:03
- Label: Atlantic; SD 1448
- Producer: Nesuhi Ertegun

Eddie Harris chronology
Cool Sax from Hollywood to Broadway (1965)	The In Sound (1966)	Mean Greens (1966)

The In Sound is an album by American jazz saxophonist Eddie Harris recorded in 1965 and released on the Atlantic label. The album features Harris' first recording of "Freedom Jazz Dance" which would become a jazz standard after featuring on Miles Davis' album Miles Smiles (Columbia, 1966).

== Reception ==
The Allmusic review states "This is one of Eddie Harris' great records".

Professional ratings
Review scores
Source	Rating
Allmusic	5/5 stars

== Track listing ==
All compositions by Eddie Harris except as indicated

1. "Love Theme from "The Sandpiper" (The Shadow of Your Smile)" (Johnny Mandel, Paul Francis Webster) - 5:31
2. "Born to Be Blue" (Mel Tormé, Robert Wells) - 5:12
3. "Love for Sale" (Cole Porter) - 6:04
4. "Cryin' Blues" - 4:48
5. "'S Wonderful" (George Gershwin, Ira Gershwin) - 4:43
6. "Freedom Jazz Dance" - 9:45
- Recorded in New York City on August 9, 1965 (tracks 1 & 4) and August 30, 1965 (tracks 2, 3, 5 & 6)

== Personnel ==
- Eddie Harris - tenor saxophone
- Ray Codrington - trumpet (tracks 3, 4 & 6)
- Cedar Walton - piano
- Ron Carter - bass
- Billy Higgins - drums
