= The Electrifying Eddie Harris =

Studio album by Eddie Harris
- Released: Early 1968
- Recorded: March 20, 1967; New York City
- Genre: Soul Jazz
- Length: 35:17
- Label: Atlantic; SD 1495
- Producer: Arif Mardin

Eddie Harris chronology
The Tender Storm (1967)	The Electrifying Eddie Harris (1968)	Plug Me In (1968)

The Electrifying Eddie Harris is an album by American jazz saxophonist Eddie Harris, recorded in 1967 and released on the Atlantic label.

== Reception ==
The retrospective AllMusic review states, "This is one of tenor saxophonist Eddie Harris' most famous and significant LPs... A classic date".

Professional ratings
Review scores
Source	Rating
AllMusic	5/5 stars

== Chart performance ==
The album was a big commercial success, and brought Harris back onto the pop album charts for the first time since 1961. It had seen cross-over appeal as well, reaching the jazz, R&B and pop album charts. Looking at the pop charts; the album debuted on Billboard magazine's Top LP's chart in the issue dated April 13, 1968, peaking at No. 36 during a forty-one-week run on the chart. It debuted on Cashbox magazine's Top 100 Albums chart in the issue dated April 6, 1968, peaking at No. 46 during a thirty-week run on the chart. The album debuted on the Record World 100 Top LP's chart in the issue dated April 13, 1968, and peaked at No. 42 during an eight-week run on the chart. On the Jazz charts it reached chart-topping positions; No. 1 on Record World's Top 20 Jazz LP's for weeks and No. 1 on Billboard's Best-Selling Jazz LP's, however it didn't chart on Cashbox as no Jazz chart was published there. The album remained on the Jazz charts into early 1969. Only Billboard published an R&B album chart. The Electrifying Eddie Harris reached No. 2 on the magazine's Hot R&B LP's chart during a forty-five-week run on it, remaining his most successful album on the R&B charts.

== Track listing ==
All compositions by Eddie Harris except as indicated

1. "Theme in Search of a Movie" (Charles Stepney) - 4:06
2. "Listen Here" - 7:42
3. "Judie's Theme" (Melvin Jackson) - 4:40
4. "Sham Time" - 6:50
5. "Spanish Bull" - 8:18
6. "I Don't Want No One But You" - 3:41
- Recorded in New York City on March 20, 1967

== Personnel ==
- Eddie Harris - tenor saxophone, varitone
- Melvin Lastie, Joe Newman - trumpet (track 4)
- King Curtis - tenor saxophone (track 4)
- David Newman - tenor saxophone, baritone saxophone (track 4)
- Haywood Henry - baritone saxophone (track 4)
- Jodie Christian - piano
- Melvin Jackson - bass
- Richard Smith - drums
- Ray Barretto, Joe Wohletz - percussion (tracks 2 & 5)
- Unnamed string section (track 1)
- Arif Mardin - arranger (tracks 1 & 4)

== Chart positions ==
Weekly charts
Year	Chart	Peak Position
1968	US Billboard Best-Selling Jazz LP's	1
1968	US Billboard Hot R&B LP's	2
1968	US Billboard Top LP's	36
1968	US Cashbox Top 100 Albums	46
1968	US Record World 100 Top LP's	42
1968	US Record World Top 20 Jazz LP's	1

Year-end charts
Chart (1968)	Final rank
US Billboard Top LP's – 1968	72
