= Guitorgan =

Electric guitar with added electronic organ components

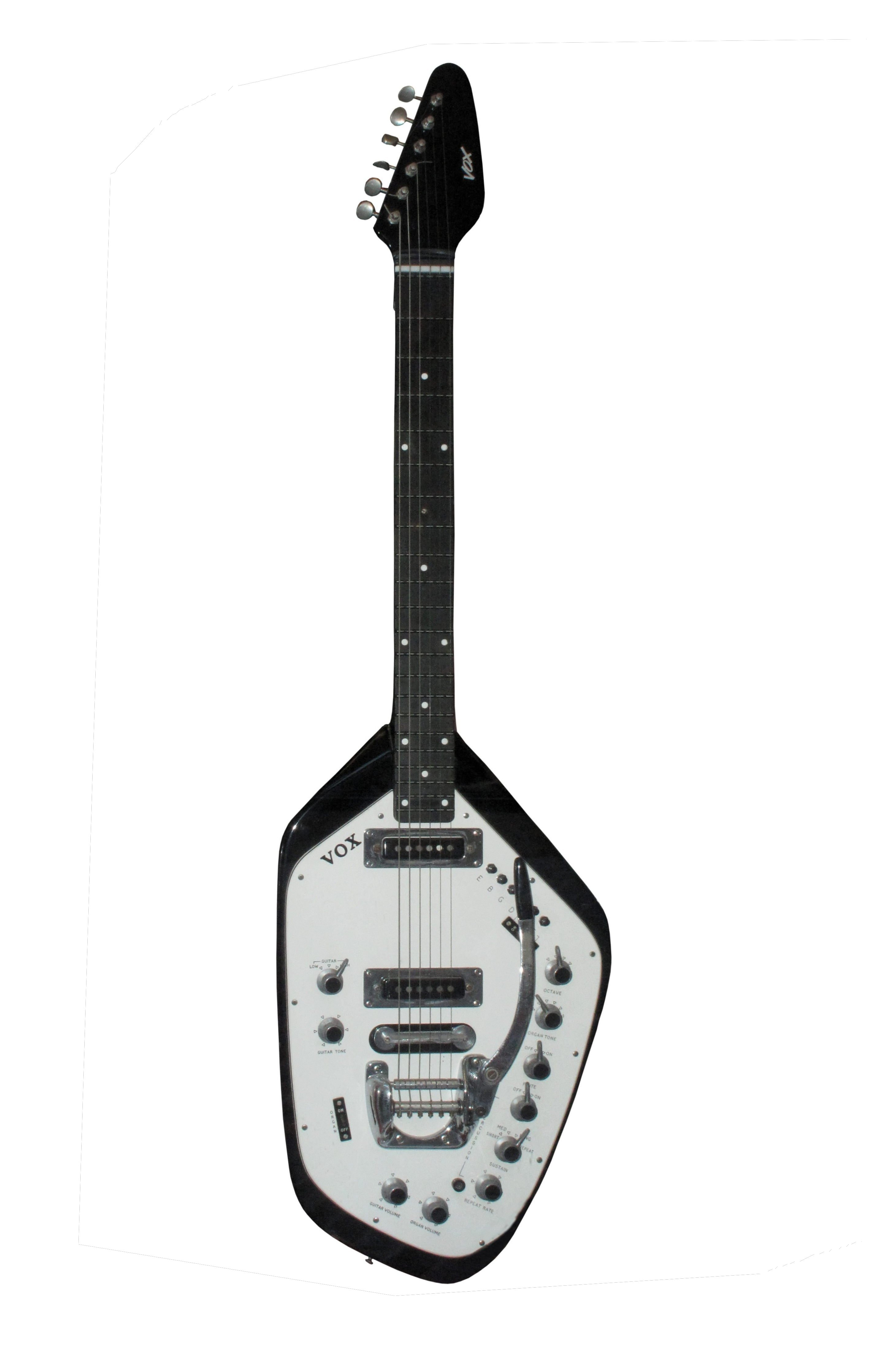
The Vox V251 (1965/1966)

Guitar Organ or GuitOrgan is a type of electric guitar which allows the player to activate an electronic organ at the same time the guitar is played. On this type of instrument, each guitar fret is separated into six segments, creating independent contact switches for each string that are activated by touching the string to the frets to produce the organ sounds. A foot pedal is used to manipulate the organ's volume in and out, allowing the player to produce guitar sounds only by traditional strumming or plucking the strings, organ sounds only by tapping the strings, or a blend of the two.

The instrument was developed by Jennings Musical Industry (Dartford, Kent, UK) as Vox Guitar Organ by 1965 at the latest. A similar instrument was developed by Murrell Electronics (Waco, Texas) as the GuitOrgan, circa 1967.

== History ==
=== VOX V251 (circa 1965) ===
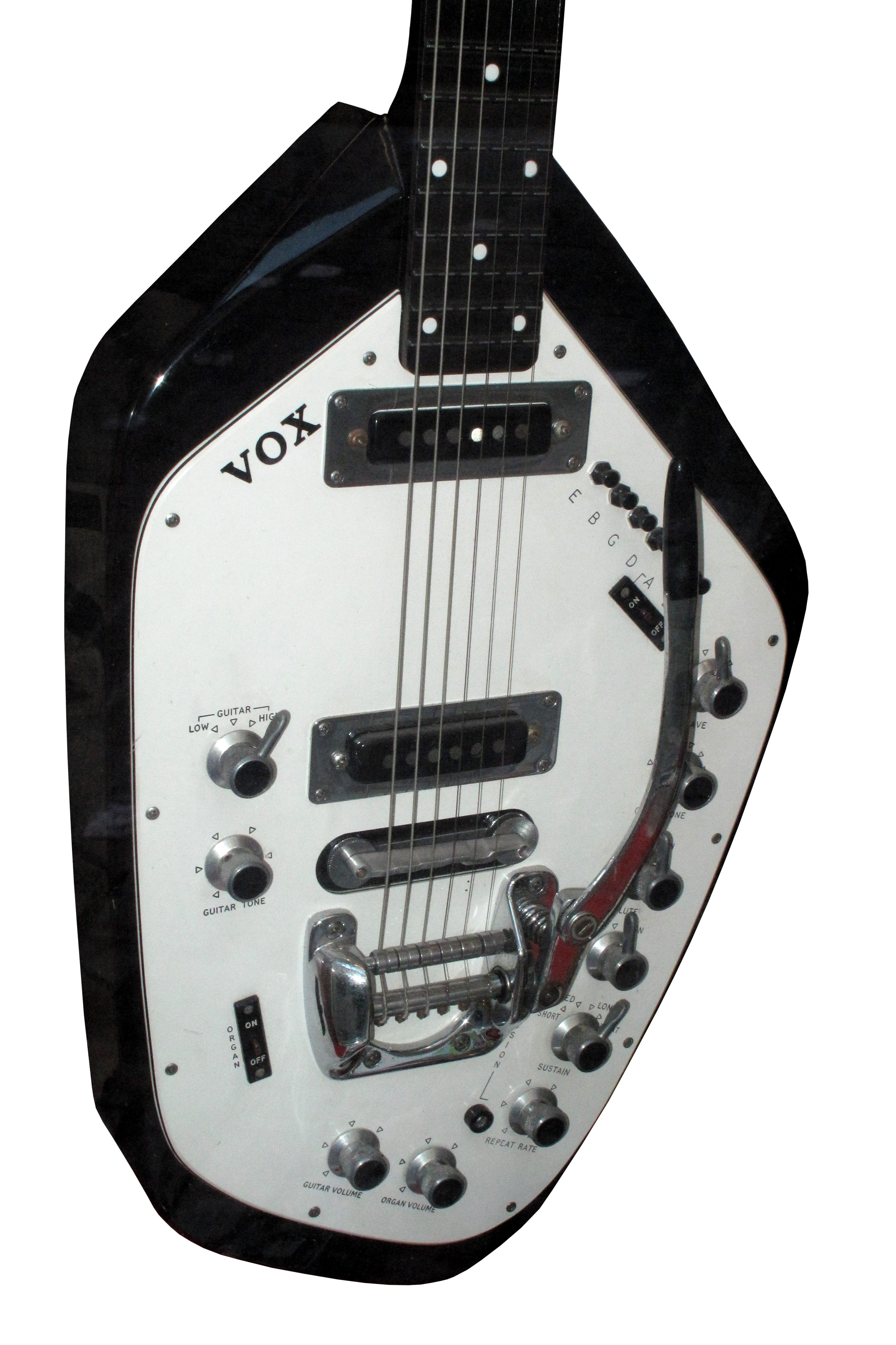
Controls of the Vox V251 (1965/1966)

According to the book Classic Keys (2019), Vox Guitar Organ was developed at latest in 1965 and released in 1966 by the Jennings Musical Industries Ltd (JMI) in the UK. It was roughly based on their Continental organ voice boards. In 1965, its sample was given to The Beatles, and Thomas Walter Jennings, a founder of JMI/Vox, said "We hope that with in a few months, they're going to be spreading it all over the world" in a television interview. John Lennon liked it enough to keep it, but it was never used on the Beatles recording session.

=== GuitOrgan (circa 1967) ===
According to the Billboard magazine, similar instrument named GuitOrgan seems introduced circa August 1967 by Murrell Electronics in Waco, Texas. The invention of the GuitOrgan is credited to Bob Murrell and Musiconics International (MCI) of Waco, Texas. Murrell worked on converting existing products from the late 1960s. In 1968, he had a significant run of instruments based on semi-hollow body guitars from Japan. The B-300 and M-340 are among the most common examples from this run. The M-300 model was introduced at the 1970 NAMM Convention.

The B-300 FSG (Frequency Synthesized Guitorgan) models, introduced in the early '70s along with the B-35, are based on a master oscillator circuit using a 12-note divider integrated circuit which is an improvement to the older 12 oscillator design, the advantage being that tuning the FSG organ circuit only requires adjustment of the master oscillator frequency rather than adjustment of each of the 12 oscillator frequencies on the older models. FSG pedals cannot be used with non-FSG Guitorgans and vice versa, since the two versions run on a different DC voltage. The multi-pin cable that goes between an FSG pedal and an FSG Guitorgan was labeled with RED ends at MCI for a safety reminder. Murrell continued to introduce upgrades to the Guitorgan design that included analog synthesizer interfaces and even MIDI in the mid-1980s.

=== Others ===
In the mid-'70s, Godwin produced the rare Organ (Guitar) in two versions. The flagship model had 19 switches and 13 knobs, while the lower model had 16 switches and 4 knobs.

== Features ==
The Guitorgan converts a standard electric guitar through the addition of electronic organ components. The most critical part of making a Guitorgan is to separate each guitar fret into six segments, creating independent contact switches for each string. The organ notes are keyed when a string touches a specific segment, thus, making the ground connection necessary for the organ circuit to produce output. TTL logic circuitry determines the highest fret segment making contact on each string, and prevents simultaneous organ notes on the same string to activate; only the highest organ note played on a particular string will sound.

The organ section in a Guitorgan is a 6-note polyphonic circuit, which allows full guitar chords to be played. The guitar section always remains playable, but organ notes can be played alone or simultaneously with the guitar. The idea behind being a "Guitorganist" is to use the Guitorgan's expression pedal to creatively and accurately bring the organ in and out of the musical foreground while playing the guitar at the same time (and vice versa) as if there are actually two separate musicians playing.

== Uses ==
Some of the sounds produced by the Guitorgan can be heard on the album The Many Moods of Teisco Del Rey by musician Dan Forte (recording under his alias "Teisco Del Rey"). Bill Dillon is another practitioner of the Guitorgan. He has performed on many Sarah McLachlan albums and appeared with Counting Crows. Woody Jackson's guitorgan playing can be heard on Orchestra Superstring's self-titled album and many film soundtracks Ocean's Thirteen, Ocean's Twelve, Fun with Dick and Jane and The Devil Wears Prada.

== See also ==
- Guitar synthesizer

== Bibliography ==
- Lenhoff, Alan S.; Robertson, David E. (2019). "Vox Continental - The voice of the British Invasion". Classic Keys: Keyboard Sounds That Launched Rock Music. University of North Texas Press. p. 170. ISBN 978-1-57441-786-9.
- "'Guit-Organ' From Texas Company". Billboard. Vol. 79, no. 33. 1967-08-19. p. 16.
