= Eddie Harris =

American jazz musician (1934–1996)

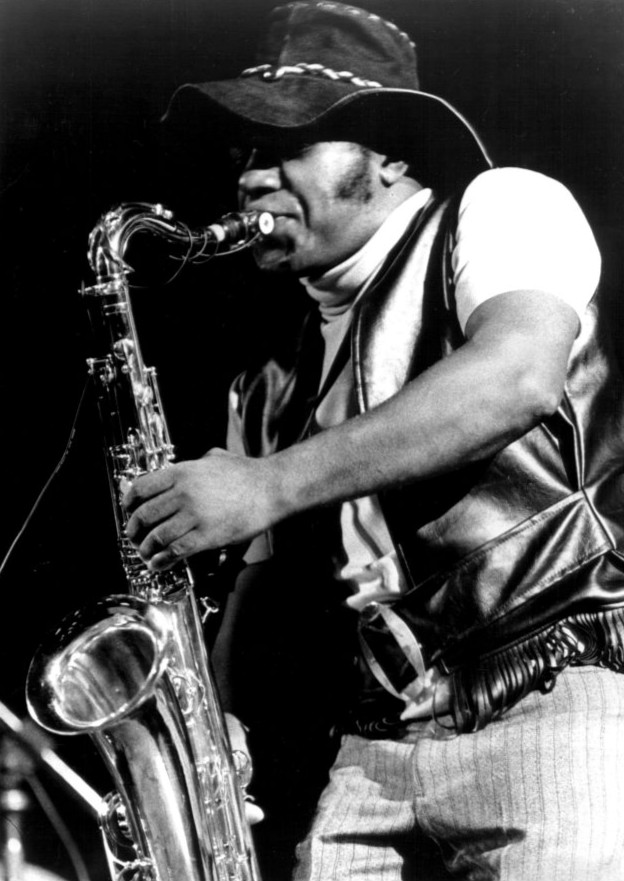
- Harris in 1972

Background information
- Born: October 20, 1934; Chicago, Illinois, U.S.
- Died: November 5, 1996 (aged 62) Los Angeles, California, U.S.
- Genres: Soul jazz
- Instruments: Saxophone, piano

Eddie Harris (October 20, 1934 – November 5, 1996) was an American jazz musician, best known for playing tenor saxophone and for introducing the electrically amplified saxophone. He was also fluent on the electric piano and organ. His best-known compositions are "Freedom Jazz Dance", popularized by Miles Davis in 1966, and "Listen Here".

== Biography ==
Harris was born and grew up in Chicago. His father was from Cuba and his mother from Mississippi. He studied music under Walter Dyett at DuSable High School, as had many other successful Chicago musicians (including Nat King Cole, Clifford Jordan, Johnny Griffin, Gene Ammons, Julian Priester, and others). He later studied music at Roosevelt University; by that time he was proficient on piano, vibraphone, and tenor saxophone. While in college he performed professionally with Gene Ammons.

After college, Harris was drafted into the United States Army and while serving in Europe, he was accepted into the 7th Army Band which also included Don Ellis, Leo Wright, and Cedar Walton.

Leaving military service, Harris worked in New York City before returning to Chicago where he signed a contract with Vee Jay Records. His first album for Vee Jay, Exodus to Jazz, included his own jazz arrangement of Ernest Gold's theme from the movie Exodus. A shortened version of the track, which featured his playing in the upper register of the tenor saxophone, was heavily played on radio and became the first jazz record ever to be certified gold.

The single, "Exodus", climbed into the US Billboard Hot 100 and reached No. 16 in the U.S. R&B chart. He moved to Columbia Records in 1964 and then to Atlantic Records the following year where he re-established himself. In 1965, Atlantic released The In Sound, a bop album which won back many of his detractors.

During the next few years, he began to perform on electric piano and the electric Varitone saxophone, and to perform a mixture of jazz and funk that sold well in both the jazz and rhythm and blues markets. In 1967, his album The Electrifying Eddie Harris reached second place on the R&B chart. The album's second track, "Listen Here", was issued as a single climbing to No. 11 R&B and No. 45 on the Hot 100. Harris released several different versions of his composition over the years, including both studio and live concert recordings. The first appeared on an early Atlantic album, Mean Greens, featuring him on electric piano. He was to re-work the track two years later, stretching it out to over seven minutes in length, for his hit version on which he played saxophone. The entire track appeared on both sides of the Atlantic hit single and edited into two parts. For the 11th Annual Grammy Awards in 1968, Harris was nominated for the Best Instrumental Jazz Performance for Small Group or Soloist with Small Group for the Album – The Electrifying Eddie Harris.

In 1969, he performed with pianist and vocalist Les McCann at the Montreux Jazz Festival. Although the musicians had been unable to rehearse, their session was so successful that a recording of it was released by Atlantic as Swiss Movement. This became one of the best-selling jazz albums ever and was nominated during the 13th Annual Grammy Awards (1970) for the Best Jazz Performance – Small Group or Soloist with Small Group.

Harris also came up with the idea of the reed trumpet, playing one for the first time at the 1970 Newport Jazz Festival. He moved from Chicago to Los Angeles in the 1970s. From 1970 to 1975, he experimented with new instruments of his own invention (the reed trumpet was a trumpet with a saxophone mouthpiece, the saxobone was a saxophone with a trombone mouthpiece, and the guitorgan was a combination of guitar and organ), with singing the blues, with jazz-rock (he recorded an album with Steve Winwood, Jeff Beck, Albert Lee, Ric Grech, Zoot Money, Ian Paice and other rockers). He also started singing comic R&B/blues songs, such as "That is Why You're Overweight" and "Eddie Who?".

In 1975, he released the album The Reason Why I'm Talking S--t, which featured his comedic stage patter along with segments of live funk and soul performances. After recording for Atlantic for over 12 years, Harris left the record company after completing his final album for the label in 1977. He then signed with RCA Records and recorded two albums.

Harris died of congestive heart failure in Los Angeles on November 5, 1996, at the age of 62.

== Discography ==
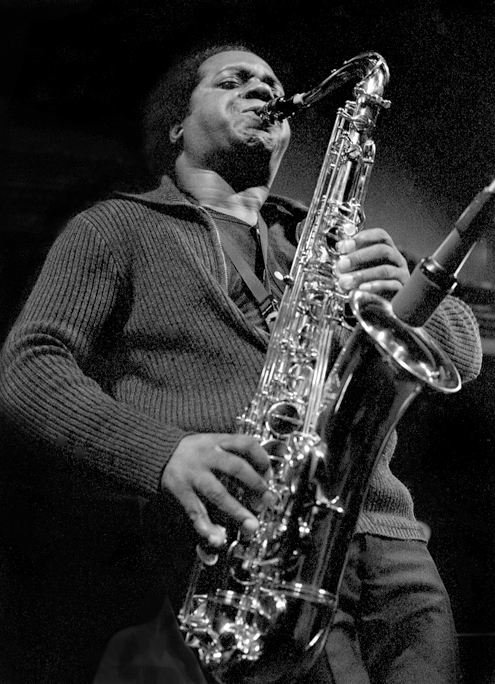
Harris at the Great American Music Hall, San Francisco, November 22, 1980

=== As leader ===
- 1961: Exodus to Jazz (Vee-Jay)
- 1961: Mighty Like a Rose (Vee-Jay)
- 1961: Jazz for "Breakfast at Tiffany's" (Vee-Jay)
- 1962: A Study in Jazz (Vee-Jay)
- 1962: Eddie Harris Goes to the Movies (Vee-Jay)
- 1963: Bossa Nova (Vee-Jay)
- 1963: Half and Half (Vee-Jay)
- 1964: For Bird and Bags (Exodus) also released as Sculpture (Buddah)
- 1964: Cool Sax, Warm Heart (Columbia)
- 1964: Here Comes the Judge (Columbia)
- 1965: Cool Sax from Hollywood to Broadway (Columbia)
- 1965: The In Sound (Atlantic)
- 1966: Mean Greens (Atlantic)
- 1967: The Tender Storm (Atlantic)
- 1968: The Electrifying Eddie Harris (Atlantic)
- 1968: Plug Me In (Atlantic)
- 1968: Pourquoi L'Amérique (Disc'Az) soundtrack
- 1968: Silver Cycles (Atlantic)
- 1969: High Voltage [live] (Atlantic)
- 1969: Swiss Movement (Atlantic) with Les McCann
- 1969: Sculpture (Buddah) previously released as For Bird and Bags (Exodus)
- 1969: Free Speech (Atlantic)
- 1970: Come on Down! (Atlantic)
- 1970: Live at Newport (Atlantic)
- 1970: Smokin' (Janus)
- 1971: Second Movement (Atlantic) with Les McCann
- 1971: Instant Death (Atlantic)
- 1972: Eddie Harris Sings the Blues (Atlantic)
- 1973: Excursions (Atlantic)
- 1974: E.H. in the U.K. (Atlantic)
- 1974: Is It In (Atlantic)
- 1974: I Need Some Money (Atlantic)
- 1975: Bad Luck Is All I Have (Atlantic)
- 1975: That Is Why You're Overweight (Atlantic)
- 1975: The Reason Why I'm Talking S--t (Atlantic)
- 1976: How Can You Live Like That? (Atlantic)
- 1978: I'm Tired of Driving (RCA)
- 1979: Playin' with Myself (RCA)
- 1980: Sounds Incredible (Angelaco)
- 1981: The Versatile Eddie Harris (Featuring Don Ellis) (Atlantic) recorded 1977
- 1981: Steps Up (SteepleChase)
- 1982: The Real Electrifying Eddie Harris (Mutt & Jeff)
- 1983: Exploration (Chiaroscuro)
- 1986: Eddie Who? (Timeless)
- 1987: People Get Funny (Timeless)
- 1989: Live in Berlin (Timeless)
- 1990: Live at the Moonwalker (Moonwalker Label)
- 1991: A Tale of Two Cities [live] (Night/Virgin) recorded 1978 and 1983
- 1991: There Was a Time – Echo of Harlem (Enja)
- 1993: For You, For Me, For Evermore (SteepleChase)
- 1993: Yeah You Right (Lakeside)
- 1993: Listen Here (Enja)
- 1993: Artist's Choice: The Eddie Harris Anthology (Rhino) 2-CD
- 1994: Freedom Jazz Dance (Musicmasters/BMG)
- 1994: Vexatious Progressions (Flying Heart)
- 1994: The Battle of the Tenors (Enja) with Wendell Harrison
- 1996: Dancing by a Rainbow (Enja)
- 1996: All The Way Live (Milestone) with Jimmy Smith; recorded 1981
- 1997: The Last Concert (ACT)
- 2005: Exodus: The Best of the Vee-Jay Years (Charly)
- 2017: Live: Las Vegas 1985 (Hi-Hat)

=== As sideman ===
With Buddy Montgomery

- Ties of Love (Landmark, 1987)

With Bernard Purdie

- Bernard Purdie's Soul to Jazz (ACT, 1996)

With Cedar Walton

- Beyond Mobius (RCA, 1976)

With Ellis Marsalis, Jr.

- Homecoming (Spindletop, 1985)

With Horace Parlan

- Glad I Found You (Steeplechase, 1986)

With Horace Silver

- Spiritualizing the Senses (Silveto, 1983)
- There's No Need to Struggle (Silveto, 1983)

With John Scofield

- Hand Jive (Blue Note, 1994)
