= Bubblehouse =

EP by Medeski Martin & Wood
- Released: April 8, 1997
- Genre: Jazz-funk; Acid jazz
- Label: Gramavision Records

Medeski Martin & Wood chronology
Farmer's Reserve (1997)	Bubblehouse (1997)	Combustication (1998)

Professional ratings
Review scores
Source	Rating
Allmusic	3/5 stars

Bubblehouse is a 1997 EP released by experimental jazz funk organ trio Medeski Martin & Wood. It features remixes and collaborations with saxophonist John Zorn, DJ Olive and DJ Logic.

== Track listing ==
All music by Medeski Martin & Wood.

1. "Bubblehouse" – 4:17
2. "Bubblehouse BBQ Mix" – 6:28
3. "Dracula" (remix) – 3:45
4. "Macha" – 3:19
5. "Spy Kiss" – 6:58

== Performers ==
- John Medeski – Hammond B3 organ, clavinet, Wurlitzer electric piano, Pianet T
- Billy Martin – drums, percussion
- Chris Wood – acoustic bass
- We/DJ Olive – Remix (Tracks 2 and 4 only)
- John Zorn – Alto Saxophone (Track 3 only)
- DJ Logic – Remix (Track 3 only)

== Credits ==
- "Bubblehouse" and "Spy Kiss" remixed for MMW by We at the Illbient Impound, Chinatown, NYC
- Mixed engineered and produced by We/DJ Olive, Loop, Once 11
- "Dracula" remixed by DJ Logic including saxophone by John Zorn
- Recorded and mixed by Scott Harding, assisted by Djinji Brown, at Greene Street Recording, SoHo, NYC
- "Macha" recorded by David Baker at the Shack, Hawaii
- Additional recording and mixing by David Baker and Bob Ward at Current Sounds, NYC.
- Mastered by David Baker and Duncan Standbury at the Master Cutting Room, NYC
- Production coordination: Liz Penta/LP Management
- Band photo: Michael Macioce
- Artwork: Billy Martin
