= Note Bleu: Best of the Blue Note Years 1998–2005 =

Note Bleu: Best of the Blue Note Years 1998-2005

Greatest hits album by Medeski Martin & Wood
- Released: April 4, 2006
- Genre: Jazz-funk, acid jazz, soul jazz, jam band
- Label: Blue Note Records

Medeski Martin & Wood chronology
End of the World Party (Just in Case) (2004)	Note Bleu: Best of the Blue Note Years 1998-2005 (2006)	Out Louder (2006)

Professional ratings
Review scores
Source	Rating
Allmusic	link

Note Bleu: Best of the Blue Note Years 1998–2005 is a 2006 “best of" compilation from avant-jazz-funk organ trio Medeski Martin & Wood, featuring selected songs from all of the band's albums released on Blue Note Records. (The band has since started an independent label, Indirecto Records.)

Note Bleu was also released in a Deluxe Edition, featuring 3 bonus tracks and a Bonus DVD.

== Track listing ==
1. "The Dropper" – 3:32
2. "Sugar Craft" – 3:19
3. "I Wanna Ride You" – 3:25
4. "Nocturne" – 4:02
5. "Partido Alto" – 5:44
6. "Hey-Hee-Hi-Ho" (Billy Martin remix) – 3:56
7. "Note Bleu" – 3:02
8. "Pappy Check" – 2:43
9. "Mami Gato" – 4:08
10. "Off the Table" – 4:16
11. "Queen Bee" – 4:55
12. "Hypnotized" – 5:03
13. "Hey Joe" – 5:01
14. "End of the World Party" – 5:09
15. "Uninvisible" – 3:37

Deluxe Edition CD:

16. "Whiney Bitches" – 3:04
17. "The Builder" (from The Dropper Japanese version) – 3:28
18. "Toy Dancing" – 6:35

== Bonus DVD ==
The Deluxe Edition Bonus DVD includes the following:

Music Videos:

- "Partido Alto" - Directed by: Adam Bork
- "The Dropper" - Directed by: Adam Bork
- "Uninvisible" - Directed by: Bill Gilman

Live Performances:

- Texaco Jazz Festival - "Sugar Craft" > "Ankhnaton" (Sun Ra) - with DJ Logic - 13:14

The performance took place on June 8, 1998 at the Texaco Jazz Festival, New York, NY
Produced, Directed and Edited by: Chuck Fishbein for Crazy Duck Productions

- NewPort JVC Jazz Festival - "New Planet" and "Queen Bee" - 12:16

The performance took place on August 13, 2005 at the JVC Jazz Festival, Newport, RI
Produced by JVC and Festival Productions, Inc.

Documentaries:

- Foreplay (2004) - Directed by: Libby Spears & Sarah Flack / Bluprint Films - 9:50
- Medeski Martin & Wood's "The Dropper" (2002) - Directed by: Marie-Pierre Jaury / Mezzo/Point Du Jour - 30:00

== Performers ==
- John Medeski – keyboards
- Billy Martin – drums, percussion
- Chris Wood – basses
