= Electric Tonic =

Live album by Medeski Martin & Wood
- Released: 2001
- Recorded: July 4, 1998 (Tonic, New York City)
- Genre: Jazz
- Length: 73:27
- Label: Indirecto Records

Medeski Martin & Wood chronology
The Dropper (2000)	Electric Tonic (2001)	Uninvisible (2002)

Professional ratings
Review scores
Source	Rating
Allmusic	link

Electric Tonic is a live jazz album by Medeski Martin & Wood. It consists of completely improvised material recorded as one piece at Tonic in New York City on July 4, 1998. Described by the band's website as "electric improvisational birthday music", it had previously been available only at their live shows and through the band's online store. It is now sold online through Amazon. For the Electric Tonic concert, electric keyboards and basses were used by Medeski and Wood respectively, a counterpart to the group's fully acoustic album Tonic, recorded eight months later at the same venue, though released first in 2000.

According to John Zorn's liner notes:

"The first new music series presented at Tonic in the summer if 1998 was an inspiring show of solidarity showcasing the full range of the Downtown scene. As always, Medeski Martin & Wood were present playing their unique blend of groove, noise, and improvisation to a packed house of enthusiastic music lovers."

== Track listing ==
No.	Title	Length
1.	"Track 1"	5:22
2.	"Track 2"	8:05
3.	"Track 3"	5:31
4.	"Track 4"	10:20
5.	"Track 5"	2:59
6.	"Track 6"	5:49
7.	"Track 7"	3:57
8.	"Track 8"	5:44
9.	"Track 9"	17:02
10.	"Track 10"	8:38

== Personnel ==
- John Medeski – keyboards
- Chris Wood – bass guitar
- Billy Martin – drums

== Credits ==
- Recorded by Federico Cribiore
- Mastered at Sony Studios by Marc Wilder
- Cover designed by David Bias
