= Last Chance to Dance Trance (Perhaps) =

Greatest hits album by Medeski Martin & Wood
- Released: October 12, 1999
- Genre: Jazz
- Label: Gramavision
- Producer: Medeski Martin & Wood

Medeski Martin & Wood chronology
Combustication Remix EP (1999)	Last Chance to Dance Trance (Perhaps) (1999)	Tonic (2000)

Professional ratings
Review scores
Source	Rating
Allmusic	4.5/5 stars

Last Chance to Dance Trance (Perhaps): Best Of (1991–1996) is a greatest hits compilation released by Medeski Martin & Wood in 1999.

== Track listing ==
1. "Chubb Subb" (new mix) – 5:21
2. "Bubblehouse" – 4:28
3. "Last Chance to Dance Trance (Perhaps)" – 7:38
4. "Hermeto's Daydream" – 7:11
5. "Is There Anybody Here That Love My Jesus" – 4:26
6. "The Lover" (new mix) – 6:47
7. "Where's Sly" (new mix) – 5:34
8. "Macha" – 3:19
9. "Beeah" – 6:56
10. "Strance of the Spirit Red Gator" – 5:54
11. "Bemsha Swing/Lively Up Yourself" – 5:39
12. "Dracula" – 4:17
13. "Night Marchers" (live April 18, 1996 in Boulder, Colorado) – 7:36

== Personnel ==
- John Medeski – keyboards
- Billy Martin – drums, percussion
- Chris Wood – acoustic bass
- Scotty Hard at Greene Street Recordings – new mixes of "Where's Sly?", "The Lover", and "Chubb Sub"
- Mark Wilder at Sony Music Studios, NYC – mastering
- Mike King, David Greenberg – production assistance
- illyB – art
- Hadley Stern – design
