= Tonic (music venue) =

Music venue in Manhattan, New York City

Coordinates: 40°43′8.15″N 73°59′14.22″W

Tonic, Lower East Side, NYC, 2005

Tonic was a music venue located in New York City founded by Melissa Caruso Scott and John Scott. First opened in 1998, it described itself as supporting "avant garde, creative and experimental music" and known for its commitment to musical integrity. Tonic was a former kosher winery and after opening quickly became a focal point of the downtown avant-garde scene. The small and unassuming building provided a sense of intimacy by setting the performers within arm's length of the audience. Tonic also doubled as a place for a variety of musicians to record live.

In April 2007, Tonic would permanently close its doors due to soaring rent on the Lower East Side. As gentrification spread through the Lower East Side, apartment high-rises were built on either side of the club, eventually pushing the club to close its doors. On Friday, April 13, 2007, Tonic would host its final show, an evening of improvisation organized by John Zorn and a techno party, The Bunker, hosted by Bryan Kasenic (DJ Spinoza). The closure the following day was accompanied by a symbolic protest. There were more than 100 protestors and two musicians, (Marc Ribot and Rebecca Moore) refused to leave, resulting in an arrest for trespassing. The Bunker moved the following week to Luna Lounge in Brooklyn which was also a club that had recently displaced from the Lower East Side.

== Selected recordings ==
- Medeski Martin & Wood, Electric Tonic, July 4, 1998
- R. Stevie Moore, More Moores Than Smiths – Live at Tonic, September 6, 1998 (DVD)
- Medeski Martin & Wood, Tonic, March 16–20 & 23–26, 1999
- John Zorn and Masada, Masada Live at Tonic 1999, Summer 1999 (DVD)
- Erikm, DJ Olive and Christian Marclay, September 17, 2000 (during the Electroluxe Festival)
- William Parker Clarinet Trio, Bob's Pink Cadillac, August 1, 2001
- Avey Tare, Panda Bear and Deakin, Campfire Songs, November 2, 2001 (only full performance of the album, later classified as an Animal Collective album)
- John Zorn and Masada, Live at Tonic 2001, 2001
- Wally Shoup, Paul Flaherty, Thurston Moore and Chris Corsano, Live at Tonic, September 14, 2002
- Ted Leo and the Pharmacists, Live at Tonic, June 25, 2002
- Fred Frith and John Zorn Duo, July 15, 2003
- Dennis Gonzalez NY Quartet, NY Midnight Suite, August 2003
- Marina Rosenfeld, Toshio Kajiwara and Christian Marclay, August 21, 2003 (Subtonic phOnOmena)
- Milford Graves and John Zorn, September 8, 2003
- Sunny Murray, Perles Noires Volume I, October 10, 2003
- Xiu Xiu, Live at Tonic, March 20, 2004
- Club d'Elf, Live at Tonic, May 26, 2004
- White Out w/ Jim O'Rourke and Thurston Moore, Senso, December 18, 2004
- Christian McBride, Live at Tonic, January 10, 11, 2005
- Sir Richard Bishop, [www.youtu.be/5oXOhibkEU4?si=kDWqN1EzQcVI4BNa], March 24, 2006
- Wood Brothers, Live at Tonic EP, July 25, 2006
- Marco Benevento, Live at Tonic, November 1, 15, 22, 29, 2006
- John Zorn's 50th Birthday Celebration Series recorded at Tonic
