= Friday Afternoon in the Universe =

Studio album by Medeski Martin & Wood
- Released: January 24, 1995
- Recorded: July 24–26, 1994
- Studio: Sear Sound (New York City, New York); The Shack (Puna, Hawaii)
- Genre: Jazz
- Length: 56:55
- Label: Gramavision
- Producer: Medeski Martin & Wood; David Baker; Jim Payne

Medeski Martin & Wood chronology
It's a Jungle in Here (1993)	Friday Afternoon in the Universe (1995)	Shack-man (1996)

Friday Afternoon in the Universe is the third album by the experimental jazz fusion trio Medeski Martin & Wood. The album title is taken from the opening sentence of "Old Angel Midnight", by Jack Kerouac.

The album's lead-off track "The Lover" was sampled by Bulgarian rap group Upsurt in their 2001 song "Sveteshti zhiletki".

== Critical reception ==
Professional ratings
Review scores
Source	Rating
AllMusic	3/5 stars
Robert Christgau	B−
(The New) Rolling Stone Album Guide	2/5 stars

Trouser Press wrote: "Short, rough-hewn vignettes like 'Paper Bass' and 'Tea' are pure improvisation, instantaneous explorations building into massive, irresistible grooves." The Washington Post stated that "the three players move as one through impressionistic, atmospheric patches into driving funk grooves and then off onto spacey tangents."

== Track listing ==
All music by Medeski Martin & Wood except where noted in parentheses.

1. "The Lover" – 6:19
2. "Paper Bass" – 0:56
3. "House Mop" – 3:46
4. "Last Chance to Dance Trance (Perhaps)" – 7:32
5. "Baby Clams" – 1:14
6. "We're So Happy" – 8:17
7. "Shack" – 3:02
8. "Tea" – 1:12
9. "Chinoiserie" (Duke Ellington) – 5:44
10. "Between Two Limbs" – 1:04
11. "Sequel" – 5:24
12. "Friday Afternoon in the Universe" – 6:01
13. "Billy's Tool Box" – 0:35
14. "Chubb Sub" – 5:02
15. "Khob Khun Krub" (Carl Green) – 0:47

== Performers ==
Medeski Martin & Wood

- John Medeski – acoustic piano, Wurlitzer electric piano, clavinet, organs
- Chris Wood – acoustic bass, harmonica, wooden flute
- Billy Martin – drums, percussion

Guest musicians

- Danny Blume – guitars (6)
- Tonino Benson – raygun (6), vocals (6)
- Carl Green – Thai flute (15)

Production

- Medeski Martin & Wood – producers
- Jim Payne – producer
- David Baker – producer, recording
- Bob Ward – editing at Current Sounds (New York, NY)
- Dr. Toby Mountain – mastering at Northeastern Digital (Southborough, Massachusetts)
- Billy Martin – original artwork
- Martyn Gallina-Jones – band photography
- George Grall – photography (C. Bosquianus Eggs)
