= It's a Jungle in Here =

Studio album by Medeski Martin & Wood
- Released: October 19, 1993
- Recorded: August 2–4, 1993
- Studio: RPM and Live Wire, New York City, New York
- Genre: Jazz funk
- Length: 54:50
- Label: Gramavision
- Producer: Jim Payne

Medeski Martin & Wood chronology
Notes from the Underground (1992)	It's a Jungle in Here (1993)	Friday Afternoon in the Universe (1995)

It's a Jungle in Here is the second album by the experimental jazz funk trio Medeski Martin & Wood, released in 1993. The trio supported the album by playing shows with Bio Ritmo. "Bemsha Swing/Lively Up Yourself" is a medley of Thelonious Monk and Bob Marley.

== Critical reception ==
Professional ratings
Review scores
Source	Rating
AllMusic	4/5 stars
(The New) Rolling Stone Album Guide	3/5 stars

Trouser Press wrote that "the trio transports King Sunny Ade's 'Moti Mo' into a languorous sprawl cleverly accented by Soweto Township-like horns, summons the spirit of the Meters on 'Wiggly's Way' and burns down the joint on the scorching 'Beeah'." The Washington Post noted that "Medeski is both the color and melody man, delighting in thickly layered organ blues lines and emphatic piano chords that add both texture and momentum to 'Shuck It Up' and the title track." The Austin American-Statesman called the album "creative and challenging music, pumped up with strong street sensibilities and performed with undeniable virtuosity."

== Track listing ==
All songs by Medeski Martin & Wood except where noted.

1. "Beeah" – 6:56
2. "Where's Sly?" – 5:22
3. "Shuck It Up" – 7:41
4. "Sand" – 2:23
5. "Worms" – 5:04
6. "Bemsha Swing/Lively Up Yourself" (Thelonious Monk/Bob Marley) – 5:39
7. "Moti Mo" (King Sunny Adé) – 7:57
8. "It's a Jungle in Here" – 3:46
9. "Syeeda's Song Flute" (John Coltrane) – 5:53
10. "Wiggly's Way" – 4:09

== Personnel ==
Medeski Martin & Wood

- John Medeski – acoustic piano, Wurlitzer electric piano, organ, horn arrangements
- Chris Wood – bass
- Billy Martin – drums, percussion

Guest musicians

- Marc Ribot – guitars
- David Binney – alto saxophone
- Jay Rodriguez – alto saxophone, tenor saxophone
- Josh Roseman – trombone
- Steven Bernstein – trumpet, flugelhorn

Production

- Jim Payne – producer
- Steven Miller – recording, mixing
- Alan Martin – photography
- Billy Martin – logo artwork
- Adrienne Di Giovine – design
- Andrea Pirrotti – package coordinator
