= Woodstock Sessions Vol. 2 =

Studio album by Medeski Martin & Wood + Nels Cline
- Released: April 15, 2014
- Recorded: August 27, 2013
- Studio: Applehead Studios in Woodstock, NY
- Genre: Jazz
- Length: 63:56
- Label: Woodstock Sessions; WS 002

Medeski Martin & Wood chronology
Free Magic (2012)	Woodstock Sessions Vol. 2 (2014)	Juice (2014)

Nels Cline chronology
Initiate (2010)	Woodstock Sessions Vol. 2 (2014)	Room (2014)

Woodstock Sessions Vol. 2 is an album by Medeski Martin & Wood and guitarist Nels Cline which was recorded live in the studio and released in April 2014 on the band's Woodstock Sessions label.

== Reception ==
Professional ratings
Review scores
Source	Rating
AllMusic	4/5 stars
All About Jazz	4.5/5 stars
PopMatters	8/10 stars

The AllMusic review by Sean Westergaard awarded the album 4 stars out of 5, stating "These guys are sonic explorers and over the course of the session they go just about everywhere: electronic ambient, soul jazz, rock freakouts, '50s sci-fi, mysterious exotica, and even a little taste of New Orleans. It's not for everyone, but fans of either band should be thrilled, as should anyone interested in well-done experimental music without boundaries". Writing for All About Jazz, John Kelman said "Woodstock Sessions, Vol. 2 finds the decade-long Wilco guitarist encouraging the trio to go to musical places no one has truly gone before. It may be a roller coaster of a listen but it's still somehow a strangely attractive one, especially when experienced old school, as a whole rather than a set of nine individual tracks". PopMatters' Will Layman stated "Woodstock Sessions Vol. 2 features a group of musicians who could easily play to the audiences that are so utterly ready to love them. Instead, they play for themselves, for the passion they have for their art. It’s not a record to alienate fans, but it’s a record to challenge fans and win them over to stretches beyond their comfort zone. A thrill, a dare, a terrific record".

== Track listing ==
All compositions by John Medeski, Nels Cline, Chris Wood and Billy Martin.

1. "Doors of Deception"- 2:12
2. "Bonjour Beze" - 11:51
3. "Mezcal" - 5:53
4. "Los Blank" - 14:29
5. "Jade" - 4:11
6. "Looters" - 10:46
7. "Conebranch" - 2:10
8. "Arm & Leg" - 8:17
9. "Cinders"- 5:11

== Personnel ==
- Nels Cline - guitar
- John Medeski - keyboards
- Chris Wood - bass
- Billy Martin - drums
