= Omnisphere =

2018 album by album by Medeski, Martin & Wood

Live album by Medeski Martin & Wood
- Released: September 14, 2018
- Recorded: February 2015
- Venues: The Newman Center in Denver, Colorado
- Genre: Jazz
- Label: Indirecto Records
- Producers: Billy Martin and John Medeski, Executive Producer Michael Watt

Medeski Martin & Wood chronology
| Juice (2014) | Omnisphere (2018) |

Professional ratings
Review scores
| Source | Rating |
|---|---|
| The Absolute Sound | 4/5 stars |
| Spectrum Culture | 3/5 stars |

Omnisphere is an album by avant-jazz-funk organ trio Medeski, Martin & Wood and the "new music collective" Alarm Will Sound orchestra recorded live at the Newman Center for the Performing Arts in Denver CO.

== Reception ==
In his review for DownBeat, Michael Jackson stated, "Medeski Martin & Wood’s new album offers a summation of the group’s purpose three decades into its unconventional career. Omnisphere (Indirecto), recorded in 2015 with new-music ensemble Alarm Will Sound, provides evidence of the trio’s boundless creativity." Philip Boot of JazzTimes stated, "on the provocative Omnisphere, recorded live in 2015, Medeski Martin & Wood venture into contemporary classical music, with the help of 20-piece chamber orchestra Alarm Will Sound." Spectrum Culture's Will Layman commented, "With Omnisphere, MMW proves again that they are committed to surprises despite their popularity. Collaborating with Alarm Will Sound, a small orchestra from the “new music” side of the classical world, they have created yet another kind of hybrid creativity." Bill Milkowski of The Absolute Sound commented, "...the direct hits far outweigh the misses throughout this intriguing double vinyl album."

== Track listing ==
1. Kid Tao Mammal (unworldliness weirdo)
2. Anonymous Skulls
3. Coral Sea
4. oh ye of little faith… (do you know where your children are?)
5. Northern Lights
6. Eye of Ra
7. End of the World Party

== Performers ==
- John Medeski, piano and keyboards
- Billy Martin, percussion
- Chris Wood, bass
- Erin Lesser, flutes
- Christa Robinson, oboe
- Hideaki Aomori, clarinet
- Elisabeth Stimpert, bass clarinets
- Michael Harley, bassoon
- Matt Marks, horn
- Jason Price, trumpet
- Michael Clayville, trombone
- John Orfe, piano
- Chris Thompson, percussion
- Matt Smallcomb, percussion
- Courtney Orlando, violin
- Caleb Burhans, violin
- Isabel Hagen, viola
- Stefan Freund, cello
- Miles Brown, bass
- Alan Pierson, conductor and Artistic Director
