= Zaebos: Book of Angels Volume 11 =

Zaebos: Book of Angels Vol.11

Studio album by Medeski Martin & Wood
- Released: August 19, 2008
- Recorded: January and March 2008, Shackston Studio, NY
- Genre: Avant-garde jazz, klezmer
- Length: 54:20
- Label: Tzadik TZ 7368
- Producer: Medeski Martin & Wood

Book of Angels chronology
Lucifer: Book of Angels Volume 10 (2008)	Zaebos: Book of Angels Vol.11 (2008)	Stolas: Book of Angels Volume 12 (2009)

Medeski Martin & Wood chronology
Let's Go Everywhere (2008)	Zaebos: Book of Angels Volume 11 (2008)	The Radiolarian Series (2008-09)

Zaebos: Book of Angels Volume 11 is an album of compositions by John Zorn released in 2008 by experimental jazz fusion trio Medeski Martin & Wood performing compositions from John Zorn's second Masada book, "The Book of Angels" on the Tzadik label.

== Reception ==
Professional ratings
Review scores
Source	Rating
AllMusic	4.5/5 stars

The AllMusic review by stated "The music resembles other Masada work in its balance of grooves, frenetic soloing, and swirling melodies derived from klezmer, the Middle East, and Eastern European traditions. But keyboardist John Medeski, bassist Chris Wood, and drummer Billy Martin bring their unique, groove-saturated stamp to Zorn’s experimentation, resulting in an overall accessible performance that overflows with technical mastery". All About Jazz reviewer Troy Collins stated "Zaebos is a homecoming of sorts for both Zorn and the Brooklyn-based trio. An endlessly rewarding listen, this session is one of Medeski, Martin & Wood's most varied and enjoyable releases, and one of the most commanding interpretations of the Book of Angels".

== Track listing ==
All compositions by John Zorn

1. "Zagzagel" - 5:24
2. "Sefrial" - 4:47
3. "Agmatia" - 5:21
4. "Rifion" - 4:26
5. "Chafriel" - 7:22
6. "Ahaij" - 3:42
7. "Asaliah" - 4:42
8. "Vianuel" - 3:33
9. "Jeduthun" - 3:05
10. "Malach Ha-Sopher" - 6:50
11. "Tutrusa`i" - 5:08

== Personnel ==
- John Medeski – keyboards
- Chris Wood – electric bass, bass
- Billy Martin – drums, percussion
