= Mago (album) =

Studio album by Billy Martin & John Medeski
- Released: 10 April 2007
- Recorded: July 2006
- Studio: Applehead Studio, Saugerties, New York
- Genre: Jazz
- Length: 49:31
- Label: Amulet
- Producer: Billy Martin

Mago is a jazz album released by Billy Martin and John Medeski of the jazz trio Medeski Martin & Wood. Mago was recorded over two days in July 2006 and was produced by Martin, who plays drums. Medeski plays Hammond B3 organ.

== Track listing ==
1. "Introducing Mago"
2. "Crustaceatron"
3. "Mojet"
4. "Apology"
5. "Bamboo Pants"
6. "Thundercloud"
7. "Bonfa"
8. "Safak"
9. "Miss Teardrop"
10. "Sycretism"
11. "L'Aventura"
