= Combustication =

Studio album by Medeski Martin & Wood
- Released: August 11, 1998
- Recorded: Magic Shop, New York City
- Genre: Jazz-funk, jazz fusion, acid jazz, jam band
- Length: 60:40
- Label: Blue Note Records
- Producer: Medeski Martin & Wood, David Baker, Scott Harding

Medeski Martin & Wood chronology
Bubblehouse (1997)	Combustication (1998)	Combustication Remix EP (1999)

Professional ratings
Review scores
Source	Rating
Allmusic	4/5 stars

Combustication is the fifth (major label) release by experimental jazz fusion trio Medeski Martin & Wood, coming out on August 11, 1998. Combustication was MMW's first album for Blue Note Records, and the first to include an accompanying turntablist (DJ Logic). Combustication features instrumental renditions of the Sly and the Family Stone hit "Everyday People", as well as the traditional Hawaiian tune "No Ke Ano Ahiahi."

== Track listing ==
All music by Medeski Martin & Wood except where noted.

1. "Sugar Craft" – 3:22
2. "Just Like I Pictured It" – 3:27
3. "Start·Stop" – 6:39
4. "Nocturne" – 4:02
5. "Hey-Hee-Hi-Ho" – 3:15
6. "Whatever Happened to Gus" (MMW, Cannon) – 4:26
7. "Latin Shuffle" – 9:05
8. "Everyday People" (Stewart) – 5:27
9. "Coconut Boogaloo" – 3:57
10. "Church of Logic" (MMW, Kibler) – 6:38
11. "No Ke Ano Ahiahi" (traditional) – 4:48
12. "Hypnotized" – 13:37
  - Includes a hidden song, "Combustication" (which begins at 7:37, after two minutes of silence).

== Performers ==
- John Medeski – keyboards
- Billy Martin – drums, percussion
- Chris Wood – basses, bass drum
- DJ Logic – turntables on tracks 1, 3, 10
- Steve Cannon – spoken word on track 6

== Credits ==
- Mixed at Greene Street Recording Studios
- Assisted at The Magic Shop by Juan Garcia
- Assisted at Greene Street by Danny Madorksy, Katsuhiko Naito, and Dennis
- Mastered by Greg Calbi at Masterdisk
- Band photos: Jimmy Katz
- Design: Bleu Valdimer, Project Dragon
