= A Go Go (John Scofield album) =

Studio album by John Scofield
- Released: 1998
- Studio: Avatar Recording Studios and River Sound (New York City, New York)
- Genre: Jazz funk
- Length: 51:50
- Label: Verve
- Producer: Lee Townsend

John Scofield chronology
Quiet (1996)	A Go Go (1998)	Old Folks (1999)

Medeski Scofield Martin & Wood chronology
A Go Go (1998)	Out Louder (2006)

Professional ratings
Review scores
Source	Rating
All About Jazz	4.5/5 stars
AllMusic	4/5 stars
The Penguin Guide to Jazz Recordings	3.5/4 stars

A Go Go is an album by the jazz guitarist John Scofield. It is his first collaboration with Medeski Martin & Wood.

== Track listing ==
All compositions by John Scofield.

No.	Title	Length
1.	"A Go Go"	6:36
2.	"Chank"	6:46
3.	"Boozer"	5:27
4.	"Southern Pacific"	5:13
5.	"Jeep on 35"	4:31
6.	"Kubrick"	2:13
7.	"Green Tea"	5:11
8.	"Hottentot"	6:46
9.	"Chicken Dog"	6:22
10.	"Deadzy"	2:41

== Japanese release bonus tracks ==
No.	Title	Length
11.	"Like It or Not"	7:13
12.	"Hope Springs Eternal"	4:20

== Personnel ==
- John Scofield – electric guitars, acoustic guitars, whistle
- John Medeski – acoustic piano, Wurlitzer electric piano, clavinet, organ,
- Chris Wood – acoustic bass guitar, electric bass
- Billy Martin – drums, tambourine

=== Production ===
- Noel Gray – executive producer, production coordinator
- Susan Scofield – executive producer, production coordinator
- Lee Townsend – producer
- Joe Ferla – engineer, recording, mixing
- Jay Ryan – assistant engineer
- Scott Young – assistant engineer
- Greg Calbi – mastering at Masterdisk (New York, NY)
- Louisa Spier – production assistant
- Noel Herr – release coordinator
- Patricia Lie – art direction
- John Codling – design
- Marc Joseph – photography
- Dorian Romer – recording session photography
