= The Radiolarian Series =

- The cover of the 2009 box set compiling the three-part series

Studio album by Medeski Martin & Wood
- Released: Vol.1: September 30, 2008; Vol.2: April 14, 2009; Vol.3: August 4, 2009; Box Set: November 24, 2009
- Label: Indirecto Records
- Producer: Medeski Martin & Wood

Medeski Martin & Wood chronology
| Zaebos: Book of Angels Vol.11 (2008) | The Radiolarian Series (2008) |

Professional ratings
Review scores
| Source | Rating |
|---|---|
| Allmusic | 4/5 stars |
| Allmusic | 4/5 stars |
| Allmusic | 4/5 stars |

The Radiolarian Series is an album project by experimental jazz fusion trio Medeski Martin & Wood released in three installments in 2008–2009.

== Background ==
In early 2008 the band announced on their official website: "Medeski Martin & Wood are planning three tours, plus three albums in 2008. Each tour and subsequent album will consist of all NEW MUSIC. The plan: Write > Tour > Record > Repeat."

"The problem with us," keyboardist John Medeski explains, "is that when we record an album, by the time a record company gets it out, we’ve already been playing the music for six or eight months, and we’re ready to move on."

The three volumes of The Radiolarian Series were first released as three separate albums. The series was also released as a 5-CD box set in 2009.

The Radiolarian Series takes its name from radiolarians (also radiolaria), amoeboid protozoa that produce intricate mineral skeletons, typically with a central capsule dividing the cell into inner and outer portions, called endoplasm and ectoplasm.

Radiolaria grow their intricately beautiful patterned skeleton around their soft core in defiance of normal biological process. This is, according to the band, "similar to Medeski Martin and Wood's latest creative cycle."

The Radiolarian Series consists of music composed and developed over the course of the band's three-part 2008 "Viva la Evolution" Tour:

- Part One: February 19–29 (Northeast U.S.)
- Part Two: July 11–18 (Southeast U.S.)
- Part Three: November 12–22 (Pacific Northwest (U.S. & Canada))

== Track listing ==
All tracks by Medeski Martin & Wood unless otherwise noted.

RADIOLARIANS 1:

1. First Light
2. Cloud Wars
3. Muchas Gracias
4. Professor Nohair
5. Reliquary
6. Free Go Lily (traditional)
7. Rolling Son
8. Sweet Pea Dreams
9. God Fire
10. Hidden Moon

RADIOLARIANS 2:

1. Flat Tires
2. Junkyard
3. Padirecto
4. ijiji
5. Riffin' Ed
6. Amber Gris
7. Chasen vs Suribachi
8. Dollar Pants
9. Amish Pintxos
10. Baby, Let Me Follow You Down (traditional)

RADIOLARIANS 3:

1. Chantes des Femmes
2. Satan Your Kingdom Must Come Down (traditional)
3. Kota
4. Undone
5. Wonton
6. Walk Back
7. Jean's Scene
8. Broken Mirror
9. Gwyra Mi

== Radiolarians Box Set ==
The 2009 box set included the original three discs, plus a full-length DVD, a live disc, a remix disc, and two vinyl records.

== Performers ==
- John Medeski – keyboards
- Billy Martin – drums, percussion
- Chris Wood – basses

== Credits ==
Produced by Medeski Martin & Wood Recorded at Shackston Studio, Kingston, NY Mixed at Synergy Recording, Kingston NY Recorded & Mixed by David Kent, Assisted by Jed Kosiner Mastered by Alan Silverman, Arf Mastering Management by Liz Penta, Emcee Artist Management
