= End of the World Party (Just in Case) =

Studio album by Medeski Martin & Wood
- Released: September 7, 2004
- Genre: Jazz
- Label: Blue Note Records
- Producer: John King

Medeski Martin & Wood chronology
Uninvisible (2002)	End of the World Party (Just in Case) (2004)	Note Bleu: Best of the Blue Note Years 1998-2005 (2006)

Professional ratings
Review scores
Source	Rating
Allmusic	4/5 stars

End of the World Party (Just in Case) is the eighth studio album by Medeski Martin & Wood. It was released in 2004 by Blue Note Records, and produced by King Gizmo of the Dust Brothers.

== Track listing ==
1. "Anonymous Skulls" – 4:24
2. "End of the World Party" – 5:11
3. "Reflector" – 4:11
4. "Bloody Oil" – 4:42
5. "New Planet" – 4:07
6. "Mami Gato" – 4:10
7. "Shine It" – 4:59
8. "Curtis" – 4:38
9. "Ice" – 4:33
10. "Sasa" – 4:16
11. "Midnight Poppies/Crooked Birds" – 3:44
12. "Queen Bee" – 4:58
13. "Whiney Bitches" (Vinyl and iTunes Bonus Track) – 3:08

== Personnel ==
- John Medeski – keyboards
- Billy Martin – drums, percussion
- Chris Wood – basses
- Marc Ribot – guitar on tracks 3, 5, 10, 12
- Steven Bernstein – slide trumpet on track 10
- Briggan Krauss – saxophone on track 10
