= Out Louder =

Studio album by Medeski Scofield Martin & Wood
- Released: September 26, 2006
- Recorded: January 2006
- Studio: Shacklyn Studios and Bedford Studios (Brooklyn, New York)
- Genre: Jazz, jazz funk, jazz fusion, jam band
- Label: Indirecto Records

John Scofield chronology
That's What I Say: John Scofield Plays the Music of Ray Charles (2006)	Out Louder (2006)	This Meets That (2007)

Medeski Martin & Wood chronology
Note Bleu: Best of the Blue Note Years 1998-2005 (2006)	Out Louder (2006)	Let's Go Everywhere (2008)

Professional ratings
Review scores
Source	Rating
AllMusic	3.5/5 stars
Okayplayer	4/5 stars

Out Louder is an album produced as a collaboration between Medeski Martin & Wood and John Scofield. It is the first album released under the name "Medeski Scofield Martin & Wood," since 1998's A Go Go was released under Scofield's name alone. "A Go Go was John's record and we were essentially sidemen, where Out Louder musically comes from all of us" explains Wood.

== Track listing ==
All songs by Medeski Scofield Martin & Wood unless noted.

1. "Little Walter Rides Again" (Scofield) – 3:55
2. "Miles Behind" – 2:53
3. "In Case the World Changes Its Mind" – 3:41
4. "Tequila and Chocolate" (Wood) – 6:25
5. "Tootie Ma Is a Big Fine Thing" (Traditional, public domain) – 4:42
6. "Cachaça" (Wood) – 4:14
7. "Hanuman" – 6:24
8. "Telegraph" – 3:55
9. "What Now" – 4:54
10. "Julia" (Lennon, McCartney) – 5:18
11. "Down the Tube" – 11:40
12. "Legalize It" (Tosh) – 3:55

== Performers ==
- John Medeski – keyboards
- John Scofield – guitars
- Chris Wood – basses
- Billy Martin – drums, percussion

=== Production ===
- Tom Camuso – recording
- Andy Tommasi – assistant engineer
- Scotty Hard – mixing at Bob James Studio
- Michael Fossenkemper – mastering at Turtle Tone Studios (New York, NY)
- Yalitza Ferreras – art direction, design
- Danny Clinch – photography
- Liz Penta – management
- Susan Scofield – management
