= Farmer's Reserve =

Studio album by Medeski Martin & Wood
- Released: 1997
- Recorded: February 11, 1997
- Studio: The Shack (Hawaii); Clinton Recording Studios (New York City, New York)
- Genre: Avant-jazz
- Length: 57:36
- Label: Indirecto Records

Medeski Martin & Wood chronology
Shack-man (1996)	Farmer's Reserve (1997)	Bubblehouse (1997)

Professional ratings
Review scores
Source	Rating
Allmusic	link

Farmer's Reserve is a 1997 independently released album by experimental jazz-funk organ trio Medeski, Martin & Wood. It consists of a 40-minute minimalist improvisation followed by a 15-minute epilogue. It was originally only available at the band's concerts and online store.

== Track listing ==
All tracks by Medeski Martin & Wood

1. "Part 1 (1)" – 4:02
2. "Part 1 (2)" – 2:55
3. "Part 1 (3)" – 4:23
4. "Part 1 (4)" – 3:46
5. "Part 2 (1)" – 6:35
6. "Part 2 (2)" – 3:23
7. "Part 2 (3)" – 2:34
8. "Part 2 (4)" – 7:10
9. "Part 3 (1)" – 3:09
10. "Part 3 (2)" – 4:27
11. "Epilogue" – 15:12

== Personnel ==
Medeski Martin & Wood

- John Medeski – acoustic piano, toy piano, Yamaha CS01 II synthesizer, caxixi
- Chris Wood – guitars, acoustic bass
- Billy Martin – drums, talking drum, bells, bongos, caxixi, cowbells, gongs, marimba, rattles, seed pods, woodblocks, snail

=== Production ===
- David Baker – mixing
- Katzuhiko Naito – mixing
- Christopher Newbert – photography
