= Uninvisible =

Studio album by Medeski Martin & Wood
- Released: April 9, 2002
- Studios: Bearsville (Bearsville, New York); Shacklyn (Brooklyn, New York); The Magic Shop (New York City, New York)
- Genres: Jazz funk, acid jazz, soul jazz, jam band
- Length: 50:17
- Label: Blue Note
- Producer: Scotty Hard

Medeski Martin & Wood chronology
Electric Tonic (2001)	Uninvisible (2002)	End of the World Party (Just in Case) (2004)

Professional ratings
Review scores
Source	Rating
AllMusic	4/5 stars
Rolling Stone	favorable
Pitchfork	6.3/10

Uninvisible is the seventh studio album by avant-jazz-funk organ trio Medeski Martin & Wood, released by Blue Note Records in 2002.

== Track listing ==
All tracks by Medeski Martin & Wood except where noted.

1. "Uninvisible" – 3:37
2. "I Wanna Ride You" (Medeski) – 3:28
3. "Your Name Is Snake Anthony" (Hampton, MMW) – 3:12
4. "Pappy Check" – 2:46
5. "Take Me Nowhere" – 4:06
6. "Retirement Song" – 4:47
7. "Ten Dollar High" – 3:42
8. "Where Have You Been?" – 3:37
9. "Reprise" (Medeski) – 0:35
10. "Nocturnal Transmission" – 6:37
11. "Smoke" – 2:46
12. "First Time Long Time" – 2:52
13. "The Edge of Night" – 3:53
14. "Off the Table" – 4:15

== Performers ==
Medeski Martin & Wood

- John Medeski – acoustic piano, Fender Rhodes, Wurlitzer electric piano, clavinet, Hammond A100 organ, melodica, Mellotron, ARP String Ensemble, Hohner String Performer, Minimoog, Pro-One, Super Genie Stringer
- Chris Wood – acoustic bass, electric bass
- Billy Martin (aka illy B) – drums, talking drum, batá, bells, Burundi drums, pods, triangle

Guest musicians

- Danny Blume – guitars (4, 14), baritone guitar (4), ambient guitar (6, 10)
- Scotty Hard – feedback (3), Nomad Rhythm Maker (5, 13), rhythm guitar (6), turntables (12)
- Eddie Bobé – congas (5, 6), batá (5, 6), shekere (5, 6), bottle (5, 6), bell (5, 6)
- Michael Herbst – baritone saxophone (1, 10), bass clarinet (1, 10)
- Stuart D. Bogie – tenor saxophone (1, 10), contra-alto clarinet (1, 10)
- Aaron Johnson – trombone (1, 10)
- Jordan McLean – trumpet (1, 10), flugelhorn (1, 10)
- Todd Simon – trumpet (1, 10), flugelhorn (1, 10)
- DJ Olive – turntables (3, 14)
- DJ P Love – turntables (4, 6, 7, 13)
- Col. Bruce Hampton – vocals (3)
- Brad Roberts – vocals (8)

Production

- Scotty Hard – producer, engineer, mixing
- Greg Griffiths – additional engineer
- Tom Camuso – assistant engineer
- Juan Garcia – assistant engineer
- Philip J. Harvey – assistant engineer
- Jeff Jakubowski – assistant engineer
- Mike Fossenkemper – assembling, editing and tweaking at Turtle Tone Studios (Englewood, New Jersey)
- Howie Weinberg – mastering at Masterdisk (New York City, New York)
- Zach Hochkeppel – product manager
- Dave Bias – art direction, design
- Danny Clinch – photography
