= Juice (Medeski Scofield Martin & Wood album) =

Studio album by John Scofield, Medeski Martin & Wood
- Released: September 15, 2014
- Studio: Applehead Studios and Hidden Quarry Studio (Woodstock, NY); Duro of Brooklyn (Brooklyn, NY)
- Genre: Jazz-funk, soul-jazz, jazz fusion, jam band
- Length: 63:28
- Label: Indirecto
- Producer: John Scofield

John Scofield chronology
Überjam Deux (2013)	Juice (2014)	Sco-Mule (2015)

Medeski Martin & Wood chronology
Woodstock Sessions Vol. 2 (2014)	Juice (2014)	Omnisphere (2018)

Professional ratings
Review scores
Source	Rating
All About Jazz	4/5 stars
AllMusic	3/5 stars
The Guardian	3/5 stars
PopMatters	7/10

Juice is a studio album recorded by American jazz guitarist John Scofield together with trio Medeski Martin & Wood. Percussionist Pedrito Martinez was invited as a special guest to play congas and guiro. The album was released on September 15, 2014 by Indirecto label.

== Reception ==
Thom Jurek of AllMusic stated, "While Juice is mostly engaging and satisfying, the pervasive "let's just see what happens" approach MSMW took here also has a downside: it delivers a self-contented vibe rather than one of discovery that their previous records revealed in spades." Writing for JazzTimes, Shaun Brady commented, "A staggering range of influences and approaches on its own, taken in conjunction with Juice the album spotlights just how much terrain this trio can cover while maintaining its expansive but recognizable collective identity." Troy Collins of All About Jazz added, "Considering its winning combination of tuneful melodies, danceable rhythms and earthy textures, Juice is Medeski, Scofield, Martin & Wood's most appealing, cohesive and consistently engaging release to date."

In his review for PopMatters, Will Layman wrote, "The fact that Juice is so easy to enjoy doesn't make it lesser. Every one of MSMW is capable of crazier, more wild playing. But the band's strength is in its ability to go all sorts of ways, to steer with or against the wind. Now they're on tour, where on one night they may stretch further OUT or steer more directly into the crowd's desire for groove. They do it with intelligence and a sure hand. For this recording, just sit back and enjoy the ride."

== Track listing ==
No.	Title	Writer(s)	Length
1.	"Sham Time"	Eddie Harris	5:46
2.	"North London"	Scofield	6:35
3.	"Louis the Shoplifter"	Martin	6:07
4.	"Juicy Lucy"	Martin, Wood, Medeski, Scofield	7:07
5.	"I Know You"	Scofield	8:02
6.	"Helium"	Wood	4:03
7.	"Light My Fire"	Jim Morrison, John Densmore, Raymond Manzarek, Robby Krieger	5:36
8.	"Sunshine of Your Love"	Eric Clapton, Jack Bruce, Pete Brown	10:52
9.	"Stovetop"	Scofield	5:27
10.	"The Times They Are A-Changin'"	Bob Dylan	3:37
Total length:			63:28

== Personnel ==
- John Medeski – keyboards
- John Scofield – guitars
- Chris Wood – basses
- Billy Martin – drums, cuica, talking drum, caxixi, guiro

With:

- Pedrito Martinez – congas (4, 9), guiro (4, 9)

=== Production ===
- Chris Bittner – recording
- Scotty Hard – mixing (1, 5)
- Danny Blume – mixing (2–4, 6–10)
- Tim Fodness – mix assistant (1, 5)
- Alan Silverman – mastering at Arf! Mastering (New York, NY)
- Carly Jo Morgan – art direction, design, layout
- Liz Penta – management
- Susan Scofield – management
