= Quiet (album) =

Studio album by John Scofield
- Released: September 24, 1996
- Recorded: April 3–6 and 8, 1996
- Studio: Power Station and River Sound (New York City, New York); Pyramid Sound (Los Angeles, California)
- Genre: Jazz
- Length: 50:46
- Label: Verve
- Producer: John Scofield; Steve Swallow

John Scofield chronology
Groove Elation (1995)	Quiet (1996)	A Go Go (1998)

Quiet is an album by jazz guitarist John Scofield. As with his 1992 album Grace Under Pressure, Scofield chose to integrate a horn section into his compositions. The album also features bass guitarist Steve Swallow (who was in Scofield's trio of 1980–1983), and drummer Bill Stewart. Quiet is unique in Scofield's discography as he plays only acoustic guitar. Veteran saxophonist Wayne Shorter appears on several tracks. Scofield returned to this album's format of a trio with orchestration on This Meets That in 2007.

== Critical reception ==
The Penguin Guide to Jazz Recordings selected the album as part of its suggested “core collection” of essential recordings.

Professional ratings
Review scores
Source	Rating
Allmusic	3/5 stars
Encyclopedia of Popular Music	5/5 stars
The Penguin Guide to Jazz Recordings	4/4 stars

== Track listing ==
All tracks are written by John Scofield except where noted.

No.	Title	Writer(s)	Length
1.	"After the Fact"		5:26
2.	"Tulle"		5:00
3.	"Away with Words"		6:49
4.	"Hold That Thought"		6:23
5.	"Door #3"		5:48
6.	"Bedside Manner"		6:46
7.	"Rolf and the Gang"		5:23
8.	"But for Love"		5:37
9.	"Away"	Steve Swallow	3:34

== Personnel ==
- John Scofield – acoustic guitar, arrangements (1–8)
- Wayne Shorter – tenor saxophone (3, 5, 8)
- Steve Swallow – bass guitar, arrangements (9)
- Bill Stewart – drums (1, 3, 4, 7–9)
- Duduka da Fonseca – drums (2, 5, 6)
- Horn section
  - Howard Johnson – baritone saxophone (2, 5, 6), tuba (2, 5, 6)
  - Lawrence Feldman – flute, alto flute, tenor saxophone
  - Charles Pillow – alto flute, English horn, tenor saxophone
  - Roger Rosenberg – bass clarinet
  - Randy Brecker – trumpet, flugelhorn
  - John Clark – French horn
  - Fred Griffen – French horn

=== Production ===
- Richard Seidel – executive producer
- Steve Swallow – producer
- James Farber – recording
- Joel Moss – additional recording
- Marcel East – assistant engineer
- Robert Smith – assistant engineer
- Joe Ferla – mixing
- Tony Gonzalez – mix assistant
- Greg Calbi – mastering at Masterdisk (New York, NY)
- Susan Scofield – music production
- Camille Tominaro – music production
- Bob Parsons – music preparation
- Mike Charlasch – release coordinator
- Giulio Turturro – art direction, design
- Joelle Nelson – illustration
- Karen Khune – photography
- Jimmy Katz – photography
- Arnold Turner – photography
