= Combustication Remix EP =

EP by Medeski Martin & Wood
- Released: April 20, 1999
- Genre: Jazz funk, acid jazz, nu jazz
- Label: Blue Note Records

Medeski Martin & Wood chronology
Combustication (1998)	Combustication Remix EP (1999)	Last Chance to Dance Trance (Perhaps) (1999)

Professional ratings
Review scores
Source	Rating
Allmusic	3/5 stars

Combustication Remix EP, also called Combustication Remixes, is a 1999 EP by Medeski Martin & Wood, released by Blue Note Records. It consists of remixes of songs from their album Combustication by Guru, DJ Logic, Dan the Automator, Yuka Honda and Bill Laswell.

== Track listing ==
1. "Hey-Hee-Hi-Ho" (illyB remix) – 3:54
2. "Whatever Happened to Gus" (Guru's Word to the Drums mix) – 4:39
3. "Start-Stop" (DJ Logic remix) – 6:32
4. "Nocturne" (Dan the Automator remix) – 5:41
5. "Sugar Craft" (Yuka Honda remix) – 4:10
6. "Satan's Church of Hypnotized Logic" (Bill Laswell remix) – 10:04

== Credits ==
- Mastered by Michael Fossenkemper at Turtle Tone, NYC
- Packager design: ILLYBLEAU
- Art direction: Gordon H. Jee
