= Tonic (Medeski Martin & Wood album) =

Live album by Medeski Martin & Wood
- Released: April 25, 2000
- Recorded: March 16–20 & 23–26, 1999
- Venue: Tonic, New York City
- Genre: Jazz
- Length: 69:39
- Label: Blue Note
- Producer: Medeski Martin & Wood

Medeski Martin & Wood chronology
| Last Chance to Dance Trance (Perhaps) (1999) | Tonic (2000) | The Dropper (2000) |

Professional ratings
Review scores
| Source | Rating |
|---|---|
| Allmusic | 3/5 stars |

Tonic is a live album by experimental jazz fusion trio Medeski Martin & Wood recorded at Tonic in New York City from March 16–20 and 23–26, 1999. Medeski Martin & Wood played their first live performance at Tonic on July 4, 1998, not long after the club opened in the Spring of 1998. Like their first album, Notes from the Underground, Tonic was recorded in their original acoustic format: piano, bass and drums. This format was replaced by electric alternatives brought about by the restrictions of touring during the early 1990s. The setting and format of Tonic is reminiscent of Medeski Martin & Wood's acoustic roots. The live performance was conducted in front of a 150-person audience that almost surrounded the musicians.

== Track listing ==
| No. | Title | Writer(s) | Length |
|---|---|---|---|
| 1. | "Invocation" | Billy Martin, John Medeski, Chris Wood | 5:15 |
| 2. | "Afrique" | Lee Morgan | 8:25 |
| 3. | "Seven Deadlies" | Billy Martin, John Medeski, Chris Wood | 10:56 |
| 4. | "Your Lady" (Arranged by Bob Moses) | John Coltrane | 9:12 |
| 5. | "Rise Up" | Billy Martin, John Medeski, Chris Wood | 11:14 |
| 6. | "Buster Rides Again" | Bud Powell | 7:36 |
| 7. | "Thaw" | Billy Martin, John Medeski, Chris Wood | 11:32 |
| 8. | "Hey Joe" | W. M. Roberts | 5:30 |

== Personnel ==
- John Medeski – piano, melodica
- Billy Martin – drums, percussion, mbira
- Chris Wood – bass

== Credits ==
- Recorded live by Federico Cribiore
- Prepared for mastering by David Baker and Mark Wilder
- Mastered at Sony Mastering by Mark Wilder
- Project manager: Mantis Evar
- Inlay photo: Melissa Carusa
- Art direction and design: Chippy

About David Baker (1945-2004) (Sound engineer) "A glance at his recordings reveals a phenomenal number of late-night favorites: Chico Hamilton: Still Sensitive, Paul Bley and Gary Peacock: Partners, Shirley Horn: Here's To Life, Astor Piazzolla: Rough Dancer and the Cyclical Night, Richie Beirach Trio: Trust, Anthony Davis: Hidden Voices, and, of course, pretty much anything by Medeski, Martin & Wood".
