= Shack-man =

Studio album by Medeski Martin & Wood
- Released: October 15, 1996
- Recorded: June 1996
- Studio: The Shack (Hawaii); IIwII (Weehawken, New Jersey)
- Genre: Jazz-funk, soul jazz, acid jazz
- Length: 55:29
- Label: Rykodisc; Gramavision
- Producer: Medeski Martin & Wood; David Baker

Medeski Martin & Wood chronology
Friday Afternoon in the Universe (1995)	Shack-man (1996)	Farmer's Reserve (1997)

Shack-man is the fourth album by experimental jazz fusion trio Medeski Martin & Wood, released in 1996. It was widely considered their commercial breakthrough, peaking at No. 7 on the Billboard Contemporary Jazz Albums chart.

== Production ==
The album was recorded in an isolated shack in Hawaii, with power supplied by solar energy and generators.

== Critical reception ==
Professional ratings
Review scores
Source	Rating
AllMusic	3/5 stars
The Encyclopedia of Popular Music	3/5 stars
MusicHound Rock: The Essential Album Guide	4/5 stars
The New Rolling Stone Album Guide	3/5 stars

AllMusic called the album "the best example to date of the trio's cerebral fusion of soul-jazz, hip-hop, and post-punk worldbeat." New York wrote that "the changes are episodic, as in funk, rather than conversational, as in jazz." Relix called it a "dark, funky dorm room breakthrough."

The Cleveland Scene wrote that the group "made it cool to groove again with 1996s Shack-man, a Hammond-hammered Phish-lot mainstay that opened the door for instrumental improv groups like Soulive and Particle."

== Track listing ==
All music by Medeski Martin & Wood except where noted.

1. "Is There Anybody Here That Love My Jesus" (traditional, arr. by MMW) – 4:27
2. "Think" – 5:16
3. "Dracula" – 4:16
4. "Bubblehouse" – 4:27
5. "Henduck" – 4:38
6. "Strance of the Spirit Red Gator" – 7:06
7. "Spy Kiss" – 4:22
8. "Lifeblood" – 7:06
9. "Jelly Belly" – 4:42
10. "Night Marchers" – 4:26
11. "Kenny" – 4:43

== Personnel ==
Medeski Martin & Wood

- John Medeski – Hammond B3 organ, clavinet, Wurlitzer electric piano, Pianet T, toy piano, Yamaha CSO1 II
- Chris Wood – guitars, acoustic bass, electric basses
- Billy Martin – drums, percussion

Production

- Hans Wendl – executive producer
- Medeski Martin & Wood – producers
- David Baker – producer, recording, mixing
- Katsu Naito – mixing
- Carl Green – recording assistant
- Mark Kindermann – recording assistant
- Bob Ward – editing at Current Sounds (New York City, New York)
- Dr. Toby Mountain – mastering at Northeastern Digital (Southborough, Massachusetts)
- Michael Macioce – band photography
- Billy Martin – artwork
- Liz Penta – LP management
