= Admiral Charcoal's Song =

Studio album by Rebecca Moore
- Released: 1995
- Genre: Experimental rock
- Length: 67:34
- Label: Knitting Factory Records
- Producer: James McLean

Rebecca Moore chronology
Admiral Charcoal's Song (1995)	Home Wreckordings (2001)

Professional ratings
Review scores
Source	Rating
AllMusic	4.5/5 stars

Admiral Charcoal's Song is the first album by Rebecca Moore. It was released in 1995. It is based on a surrealist musical written and directed by Moore in New York; after hearing it, Michael Dorf offered a record deal through his Knitting Factory Records label. The songs were revised and arranged before being recorded. Moore deems it a formative work, though it is popular among experimental music enthusiasts.

== Critical reception ==
Trouser Press called the album "darkly whimsical and impressionist," writing that "Moore conducts a rarefied tour through a bizarre imagination." Billboard called it "a woefully overlooked album of dark drama and hypnotic beauty."

== Track listing ==
All tracks written by Rebecca Moore.

1. If You Please Me
2. Busy Head
3. Needle Men
4. Twisty Lullag'bye
5. Outdoor Elevator
6. The Lamp Shop
7. All The Halloweens You Can Hold
8. Darkroom
9. The Sisters Bernice
10. Cripple Kingdom
11. Rosalie's Nightmare

== Personnel ==
- Rebecca Moore: Vocals, Acoustic guitar, sound effects
- Christina Campenella: backing vocals
- Jeff Buckley: Electric 6 String Bass, Drums
- Reuben Radding: Acoustic and electric bass
- Larry Miller: Voice
- Nina Piaseckyj: Cello
- Steven Bernstein: Trumpet
