= Home Wreckordings =

Studio album by Rebecca Moore
- Released: 2001
- Genre: Experimental rock
- Length: 67:34
- Label: Formerly Knitting Factory Records
- Producer: Rebecca Moore

Rebecca Moore chronology
Admiral Charcoal's Song (1995)	Home Wreckordings (2001)	Unreleased (2001)

Professional ratings
Review scores
Source	Rating
AllMusic	4.5/5 stars

Home Wreckordings (Home Wreckordings 1997-1999) is a 2001 album by Rebecca Moore. As is implied by the title, it is made up of multitrack demos Moore recorded in her living room.

== Track listing ==
1. "Stilleto'd Young Stars"
2. "This/Past"
3. "Thaw"
4. "Live in Blue Sparks"
5. "Spectral Vapor in the Neural Machine"
6. "Cartoonlust"
7. "Somehow"
8. "Joy Will Come" (a.k.a. "Joe Will Cum")
9. "Forest at Night"
10. "Fantasy"
11. "Prevention of Blindness"
12. "Sister Marianne"
