= A Different Time =

Studio album by John Medeski
- Released: April 18, 2013
- Recorded: 2013, Waterfront Studios
- Genre: Jazz
- Length: 41:28
- Label: OKeh 88765444462
- Producer: Henry Hirsch

A Different Time is a solo piano album by John Medeski, featuring performances on a 1924 French Gaveau piano, which was released on the OKeh label in 2013.

== Reception ==
Professional ratings
Review scores
Source	Rating
Allmusic	3.5/5 stars
PopMatters	4/10 stars

Critics greeted the album with mixed receptions. In his review for Allmusic, Thom Jurek notes that:

it's a 41-minute showcase of a pianist we've not really encountered -- at least at this length -- before... A Different Time may be the first solo entry for Medeski, but given its quality, it hopefully isn't the last.

— Jurek, Thom. John Medeski – A Different Time > Review at AllMusic. Retrieved April 1, 2014.

The PopMatters review by Will Layman stated:

A Different Time is an exceptionally sensitive and beautiful recording, the kind of piano music that is too genuine in feeling to be dismissed as dull or simple. At the same time, this record relies so utterly on a single tone—a fragile and out-of-tempo minor key thrumming of gloom—that any listener is excused from wishing it were much more.

— Layman, W. "PopMatters Review".

Jeff Tamarkin of JazzTimes observed:

The surprise is in the utter placidity of the music, the absence not only of loud but also of edge. Medeski willingly sets aside his innate experimental tendencies on this outing, taming his frolicsome nature to instead expose the sheer grace and sparkle the instrument afforded him.

— Tamarkin, J. (June 7, 2013). "JazzTimes Review".

On All About Jazz Doug Collette enthused:

it's virtually impossible not to get caught up in the mood of A Different Time. Stark though it is, the sound of this acoustic instrument billows throughout the course of the CD's playing time.

— Kelman, J. (April 21, 2013). "All About Jazz Review".

On the same site Dan Bilawsky noted:

Drabness, beauty, melancholy and a dash of impressionism merge in Medeski's hands during this intriguing solo piano date.

— Bilawsky, D. (March 25, 2013). "All About Jazz Review".

== Track listing ==
All compositions by John Medeski except as indicated

1. "A Different Time" - 4:33
2. "I'm Falling in Love Again" (Willie Nelson) - 5:44
3. "His Eye Is on the Sparrow" (Charles H. Gabriel, Civilla D. Martin) - 6:18
4. "Ran" - 1:54
5. "Graveyard Fields" - 6:07
6. "Luz Marina" - 5:35
7. "Waiting at the Gate" - 2:30
8. "Lacrima" - 3:55
9. "Otis" - 4:58

== Personnel ==
- John Medeski - piano

== Sources ==
- Tamarkin, J. (June 7, 2013). "JazzTimes Review".
- Kelman, J. (April 21, 2013). "All About Jazz Review".
- Bilawsky, D. (March 25, 2013). "All About Jazz Review".
