= Rebecca Moore (singer-songwriter) =

American singer-songwriter (born 1968)

- Born: May 21, 1968 (age 58); New York City, U.S.
- Genres: Alternative, experimental, ambient
- Occupations: Singer, songwriter, musician, artist, activist, actress
- Instruments: Violin, cello, piano
- Years active: 1984–present
- Website: www.instituteforanimalhappiness.com

Rebecca Moore (born May 21, 1968) is an American musician, actress, and animal rights activist. Notable for her participation at a very young age in performance art and experimental theater productions, and for her own music, she is also known to some as a girlfriend of the singer Jeff Buckley. She is the daughter of Peter Moore, a photographer of experimental art and artists in New York (from the 1950s through his death in 1993) and his wife, Barbara, an art historian. After slightly over two decades of work devoted to experimental art, music and activist realms in New York (1984–2007), Moore went to work in areas of animal rescue and care and animal rights advocacy.

== Biography ==
Moore was born and raised amidst New York City's avant-garde art scene of the 1970s. She spent many years performing in experimental works by artists such as MacArthur Award recipient John Jesurun, (including his plays Deep Sleep and Shatterhand Massacre, in the U.S. and Europe), MacArthur Award recipient Richard Foreman (in his play, I've Got the Shakes, Ridge Theater (including the Obie-winning production Everyday Newt Berman by composer John Moran and Jungle Movie), filmmaker/choreographer Jo Andres, Julia Heyward, David Patrick Kelly, Taj Mahal, Drag King Diane Torr, and more. When she was 15 years old, she began doing her own multi-media performance art pieces, sometimes solo and often with friends/collaborators such as Clarinda Mac Low and Guy Yarden at city venues such as Performance Space 122, Movement Research and Judson Church. These small pieces evolved into full-scale low-budget works; surrealist-inspired musical theater pieces with live music, where she wrote the scripts and music, built the sets, sewed and painted the costumes, made all the props, and ran the lights and sound cues. The casts often included her parents' friends or her own; Fluxus artist Larry Miller and her then-partner Jeff Buckley appeared in "Cure for the Biting of a Madde Dogge", based on Olde English medical texts, presented by Franklin Furnace at Cooper Union and La Mama ETC in 1991–1992; Her piece, "The Hinger" (1993) also starred Mr. Miller and was produced at Performance Space 122, and a third piece, "The Larynx Chalet" (1996), was presented at La Mama ETC.

Moore has two CDs, originally released on Knitting Factory Records: Admiral Charcoal's Song (1996; primarily music from her show, The Hinger. Jeff Buckley contributes instrument work on two tracks) and Home Wreckordings 1997–1999 (2000), a layered dreamscape that was created in the two years following Buckley's untimely death in 1997. This second album – which was produced entirely in her living room, before the boom of home computer recording – bears the still-rare distinction of being a collection of songs in which one female artist not only played every single instrument (including violin, cello, piano, guitar, bass, drums, children's toys, tape loops and synthesizers), but also did the recording and mixing entirely by herself as well (the only element completed externally was the mastering).

In the early 2000s Moore was active in several activist groups concerned with maintaining low income housing and the creative and cultural heritage of New York's East Village and Lower East Side. She was on the original advisory board of the first HOWL Festival of East Village Art, as well as two other active groups: Takeittothebridge.com (which she co-founded with composer Norman Yamada, and they collaborated on several actions with musician Marc Ribot as a principle organizer) and Moore founded L.O.C.O. (The Ludlow-Orchard Community Organization). Both groups have since disbanded. Takeittothebridge.com organized two high-profile actions: one series of demonstrations resulted in winning for artists an historic settlement, in collaboration with AFM Musicians Local 802, against Knitting Factory Records Management. The artists won back the rights to their work when the label disbanded, and it was the first time in the union's history that they represented independent (non-union) musicians.

With Ribot and Yamada and Takeittothebridge, Moore was also a principal organizer on The Tonic (music venue) Demonstration in 2007, a musical protest to highlight the forced closing of a popular experimental music space. Moore and guitarist Marc Ribot were arrested for refusing to vacate the premises. This is one of only two times in the city's artistic history where artists refused to vacate a cultural venue on ethical grounds and were subjected to arrest (the other incidence being the eviction of artists from Charas/El Bohio Community Center.) A press conference followed days later on the steps of City Hall, with then-city councilman Alan Gerson in attendance calling for legislation to protect important cultural spaces with rent relief. No relief legislation ever resulted, and that club and many others in the neighborhood still closed.

Having written several articles for the Musicians Union Local 802 newspaper while working on these actions, Rebecca was awarded the Saul Miller Award in Journalism in 2007 from the AFL-CIO.

Moore was also a principal organizer with a group of community members for the 2005 "A Town Hall for the Lower East Side" – which addressed the New York State Liquor Authority's unique role in gentrifying the L.E.S. and its effect on longtime artist and immigrant communities in that neighborhood. The event earned major articles in newspapers and the cover of Time Out, New York in 2005.

In 2008, Moore turned her focus back to a childhood passion: the rights of non-humans, and the exploitation of animals. Having been a vegetarian since age 10, going vegan many years later – she decided to seek out opportunities to help abused animals full-time. She has spent several years working at several farm animal rescues in Upstate New York (2008–2012), participated in large scale rescues (UCSPCA 2012), and she has worn many hats including that of humane education tour guide, animal caregiver, program co-ordinator, board member and all-around volunteer. In 2016 she founded The Institute for Animal Happiness in Upstate New York.

== Discography ==
- Admiral Charcoal's Song (1996)
- Home Wreckordings (2001)

== See also ==
- Tonic (music venue)
