= The Muse (album) =

Studio album by The Wood Brothers
- Released: October 1, 2013
- Genre: Folk
- Length: 43:11

The Wood Brothers chronology
Smoke Ring Halo (2011)	The Muse (2013)	Paradise (2015)

The Muse is the fifth studio album by The Wood Brothers, released on October 1, 2013.

== Track listing ==
No.	Title	Length
1.	"Wastin' My Mind"	2:59
2.	"Neon Tombstone"	4:55
3.	"Sing About It"	3:41
4.	"Honey Jar"	3:59
5.	"The Muse"	3:21
6.	"Keep Me Around"	3:39
7.	"Sweet Maria"	4:18
8.	"I Got Loaded"	4:03
9.	"Who The Devil"	4:09
10.	"Losin' Streak"	4:13
11.	"Firewater"	4:03
Total length:		43:11
