= The Wood Brothers =

American folk band

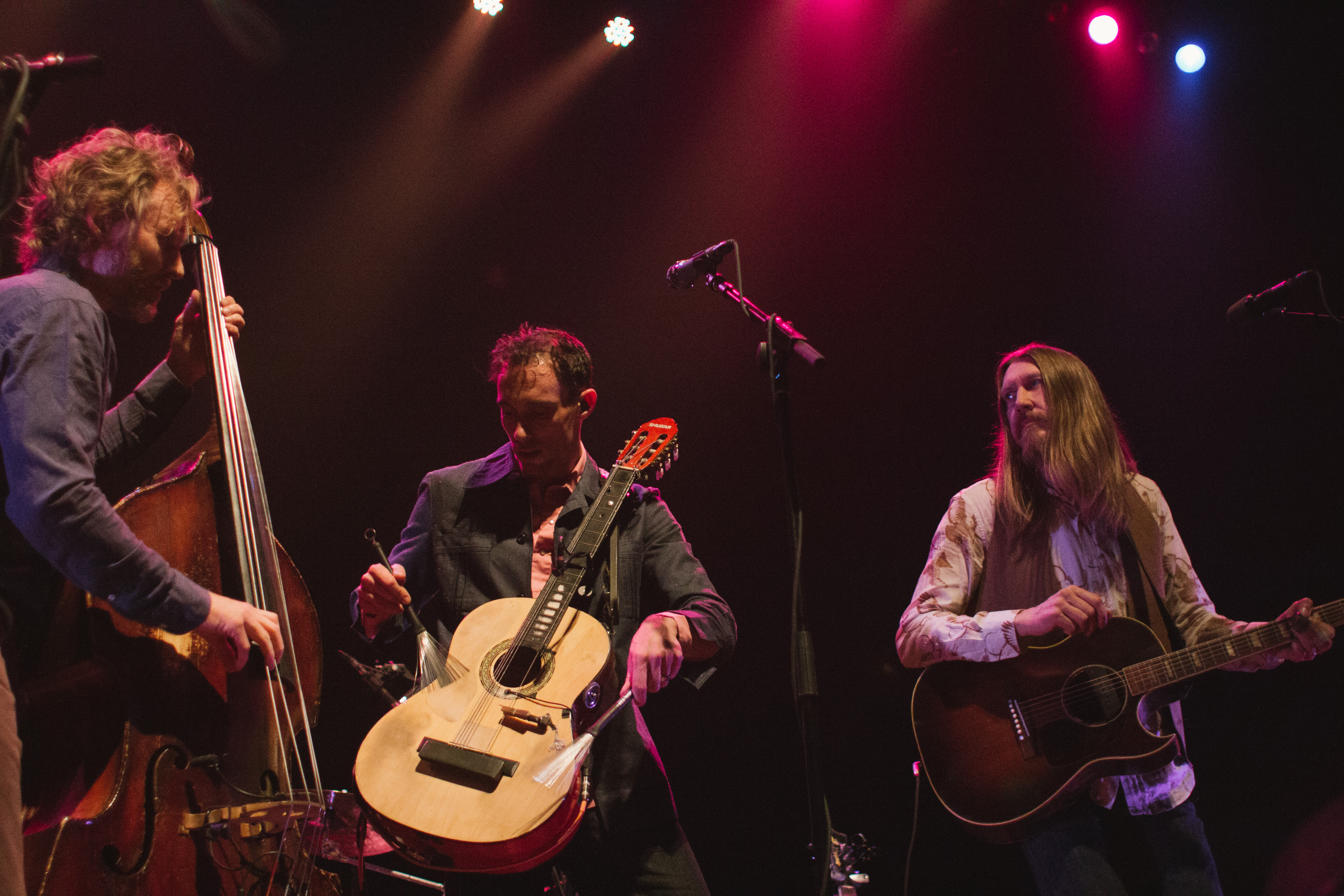

Background information
- Origin: New York City
- Genres: Folk rock; roots rock; blues rock; Americana
- Years active: 2004–present
- Labels: Blue Note (2006-2008); Southern Ground Records
- Members: Oliver Wood; Chris Wood; Jano Rix
- Website: www.thewoodbros.com

The Wood Brothers are an American roots band consisting of brothers Chris (upright bass) and Oliver Wood (acoustic and electric guitars), as well as multi-instrumentalist Jano Rix. Their music is a combination of folk, gospel, blues and jazz.

== Biography ==
From early in their childhood in Boulder, Colorado, Chris and Oliver Wood were steeped in American roots music. Their late father, Bill Wood, was an esteemed scientist who had recorded on the 1960 album Folksingers ’Round Harvard Square with Joan Baez; he performed classic songs at camp fires and family gatherings, while their mother, a poet, instilled a passion for storytelling and turn of phrase. The brothers bonded over their shared appreciation of bluesmen such as Jimmy Reed and Lightnin' Hopkins, but their paths, musical and otherwise, diverged.

Oliver moved to Atlanta, where he played guitar in cover bands before earning a spot in Tinsley Ellis’s touring act. At Ellis’s behest, Oliver began to sing and then founded King Johnson, a hard-touring group that released six albums of blues-inflected R&B, funk and country over the next 12 years. Chris, meanwhile, studied jazz bass at the New England Conservatory of Music and moved to New York City. In 1992, Chris co-founded the innovative jazz fusion group Medeski Martin & Wood (MMW), which released two dozen albums over the next two decades.

After pursuing separate musical careers for some 15 years, the brothers performed together at a show in North Carolina on May 24, 2001: Oliver sat in with MMW following King Johnson’s opening set. "I realized we should be playing music together," Chris recalled.

Oliver talks about the formation of King Johnson and the influence of Sean Costello and Donnie McCormick, drummer and lead singer of Eric Quincy Tate, in a 2022 documentary by Hal Jacobs about his favorite Atlanta music club, the Northside Tavern.

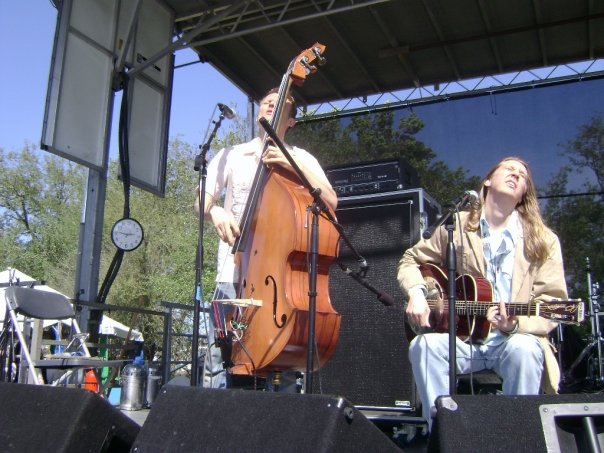
The Wood Brothers performing at 2008 Langerado Music Festival

== Recordings ==
The brothers recorded a collection of Oliver's songs to create a demo album. They landed a recording contract with Blue Note Records, who released their first studio album Ways Not To Lose in 2006. The album was produced by Chris's MMW colleague John Medeski, and recorded during September 2005 at Allaire Studios in Shokan, New York. Kenny Wolleson supported the duo on drums and percussion. Music critic Steve Leggett said that Oliver's lyrics showed him to be in a state of "perpetual spiritual dilemma" but with a "dogged hope that shines through between the cracks," the words carried on a bed of "sparse and languid" folk-blues music.

Their follow-up Loaded was released in 2008. The next year they released an EP of covers titled Up Above My Head. In 2011 the band moved recording to Nashville's Southern Ground Artists for Smoke Ring Halo, the band's first release on Zac Brown's Southern Ground label. Multi-instrumentalist Jano Rix joined the band during this period, adding his percussion and jazz piano skills, and providing vocals. In 2012 they released Live Volume One: Sky High and Live Volume Two: Nail & Tooth issued as two separate CDs or a double-LP vinyl gatefold package.

In October 2013, the Wood Brothers' fifth studio release, The Muse was released, with Buddy Miller serving as record producer. The album was recorded at Southern Ground Studios in Nashville. The Wood Brothers were by this time a Nashville-based band, with Oliver having relocated in 2012, and Chris following. It was the first time the brothers had lived in the same city since early adulthood. The Muse provided the band with their first Billboard chart success, hitting the folk, country, indie and rock charts in late 2013.

The band's next album, Paradise was released in 2015 on the Easy Eye Sound label. Paradise was the first album in which all three bandmembers shared songwriting credits. Paradise was their most successful album up to that point, reaching number 1 on the Top Heatseekers chart, and number 12 on the US Country music chart.

On February 2, 2018, the Wood Brothers released their sixth full-length album, One Drop of Truth, which they self-produced and recorded. The album was nominated for the Best Americana Album award at the 61st Grammy Awards.

The group released their eighth studio album, Kingdom in My Mind in January 2020.

The group released their ninth studio album, Heart is the Hero in April 2023.

== Discography ==
=== Studio albums ===
Title	Details	Peak chart positions						Sales
Title	Details	US Country	US	US Heat	US Indie	US Folk	US Rock	Sales
Ways Not to Lose	Release date: March 7, 2006; Label: Blue Note Records	—	—	—	—	—	—	
Loaded	Release date: April 1, 2008; Label: Blue Note Records	—	—	29	—	—	—	
Up Above My Head (8-song collection of covers)	Release date: June 9, 2009; Label: Indirecto Records	—	—	—	—	—	—	
Smoke Ring Halo	Release date: August 2, 2011; Label: Southern Ground	—	—	21	—	—	—	
The Muse	Release date: October 1, 2013; Label: Southern Ground	22	145	3	28	10	44	
Paradise	Release date: October 2, 2015; Label: Honey Jar	12	—	1	25	6	43	US: 3,100
One Drop of Truth	Release date: February 2, 2018; Label: Honey Jar	41	—	1	9	11	—	US: 3,400
Kingdom in My Mind	Release date: January 24, 2020; Label: Honey Jar/Thirty Tigers							US: 2,700
Heart Is the Hero	Release date: April 14, 2023; Label: Honey Jar/Thirty Tigers							
"—" denotes releases that did not chart

=== Live albums ===
Title	Details	Peak chart positions
Title	Details	US Country
Live at Tonic EP	Release date: 2005; Label: Junketboy	—
Live: Volume One: Sky High	Release date: May 8, 2012; Label: Southern Ground	73
Live: Volume Two: Nail and Tooth	Release date: August 12, 2012; Label: Southern Ground	—
Live at the Barn	Release date: January 13, 2017; Label: Honey Jar	—
Live at The Fillmore	Release date: September 6, 2019; Recorded: March 8 & 9, 2019; Label: Honey Jar/Thirty Tigers	—
"—" denotes releases that did not chart
