= Notes from the Underground (Medeski Martin & Wood album) =

Studio album by Medeski Martin & Wood
- Released: 1992
- Recorded: December 15–16, 1991 (Baby Monster, New York City); January 23, 1992 (Water Music, Dunellen)
- Genre: Post-bop
- Label: Accurate
- Producer: Medeski Martin & Wood

Medeski Martin & Wood chronology
Notes from the Underground (1992)	It's a Jungle in Here (1993)

Professional ratings
Review scores
Source	Rating
AllMusic	4/5 stars

Notes from the Underground is the debut album by the American jazz trio Medeski Martin & Wood, released in 1992 by Accurate Records. Unlike subsequent albums, it is notable for featuring a less prominent funk influence as the group focused on a more “traditional” acoustic sound, with Medeski playing no Hammond organ and Wood playing an acoustic bass guitar. A five-piece horn section led by Steven Bernstein contributes on several tracks.

== Track listing ==
1. "Hermeto's Daydream" (John Medeski, Billy Martin) – 7:11
2. "The Saint" (Medeski) – 6:58
3. "La Garonne" (Medeski) – 5:51
4. "Orbits" (Wayne Shorter) – 4:25
5. "Uncle Chubb" (Medeski, Martin, Wood) – 7:04
6. "Rebirth" (Medeski, Martin, Wood) – 6:28
7. "Otis" (Medeski) – 4:44
8. "United" (W. Shorter) – 8:29
9. "Caravan" (Duke Ellington, Juan Tizol, Irving Mills) – 8:18
10. "Querencia" (Medeski) – 12:48

== Personnel ==
- John Medeski – piano
- Billy Martin – drums, percussion
- Chris Wood – acoustic bass
- Steven Bernstein – trumpet
- Bill Lowe – tuba, trombone
- Curtis Hasselbring – trombone
- Thomas Chapin – alto saxophone, alto flute
- Doug Yates – bass clarinet

Credits

- Horn arrangements by Medeski
- Recorded by David Baker & Roger Teltzman
- Mixed by David Baker & John Siket at Sound on Sound, NYC
- Edited by Bob Ferapples
- Mastered by Bob Appel
- Recordings of MMW live to DAT
- Photos: Alan Martin
- Cover art ("Balafon") & design by Billy Martin
