= The Dropper =

Studio album by Medeski Martin & Wood
- Released: October 24, 2000
- Recorded: 1999–2000
- Studio: Shacklyn (Brooklyn, New York City, New York); Greene St. (Manhattan, New York City, New York)
- Genre: Jazz funk Acid jazz Jam band
- Length: 60:40
- Label: Blue Note
- Producer: Medeski, Martin & Wood; Scotty Hard

Medeski Martin & Wood chronology
Tonic (2000)	The Dropper (2000)	Electric Tonic (2001)

Professional ratings
Review scores
Source	Rating
AllMusic	3/5 stars
The Encyclopedia of Popular Music	3/5 stars

The Dropper is the sixth studio album by avant-jazz-funk organ trio Medeski, Martin & Wood.

The album peaked at No. 2 on the Billboard Jazz Albums chart.

== Critical reception ==
The Washington Post wrote: "In many ways the chaotic and funk-soul soundscapes on MMW's The Dropper are not avant-garde but downright conservative, coming 40 years after the advent of organ jazz and 30 after free jazz." Exclaim! called The Dropper "their crankiest, most difficult album to date, as they wade into pointy-headed jazz-funk realms, but that's only because they've burrowed more deeply still into the funk." The Riverfront Times thought that "Medeski's particularly compelling in his style, banging on keyboards with a precise recklessness, and he expands his keyboard army by, it seems, dozens of instruments."

== Track listing ==
All songs written by Medeski Martin & Wood, except where noted.

1. "We Are Rolling" – 7:04
2. "Big Time" – 3:23
3. "Fèlic" – 3:21
4. "Partido Alto" – 5:42
5. "Illinization" – 2:31
6. "Bone Digger" – 2:22
7. "Note Bleu" (John Medeski) – 3:01
8. "The Dropper" – 3:29
9. "Philly Cheese Blunt" – 4:49
10. "Sun Sleigh" – 2:23
11. "Tsukemono" – 3:23
12. "Shacklyn Knights" – 4:44
13. "Norah 6" – 4:51

== Personnel ==
Medeski Martin & Wood

- John Medeski – keyboards
- Chris Wood – basses
- Billy Martin – drums, percussion

Guest musicians

- Marshall Allen – alto saxophone (4)
- Marc Ribot – guitars (6–8)
- Eddie Bobé – congas (4)
- Paula Potocki – surdo (10)
- Jane Scarpantoni – cello (13)
- Charlie Burnham – violin (11, 13)
- Joan Wasser – violin (13)

Credits

- Medeski Martin & Wood – producers
- Scotty Hard – producer, engineer, mixing (1–4, 6–13)
- David Baker – mixing (5)
- Philip J. Harvey – assistant engineer
- Phil Painson – assistant engineer
- Howie Weinberg – mastering at Masterdisk (New York City, New York)
- Andy VanDette – mastering assistant
- Danny Clinch – photography
- Heung-Heung "Chippy" Chin – art direction, design
