= Guus Janssen =

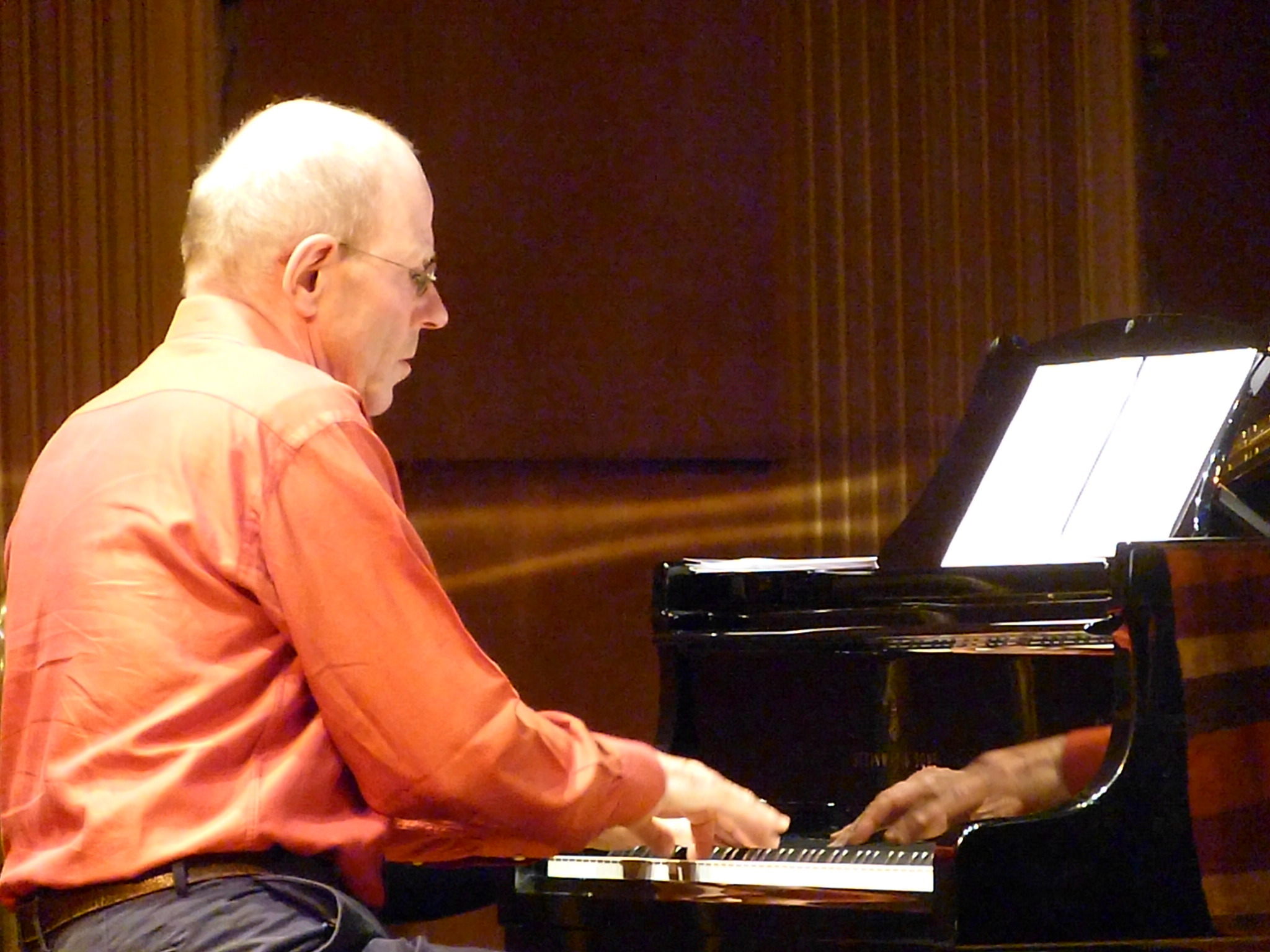
- Guus Janssen performs with the David Kweksilber Big Band in Cologne, Germany, in 2017.

Background information
- Born: 13 May 1951 (age 73); Heiloo, Netherlands
- Genres: Jazz, classical
- Occupation(s): Musician, composer
- Instrument(s): Piano, harpsichord

Guus Janssen (born 13 May 1951) is a Dutch composer of contemporary music and a recording artist. A pianist and harpsichordist, he is also active as a jazz performer.

He studied piano and composition at the Sweelinck Academy of Music in Amsterdam with Ton de Leeuw and piano with Jaap Spaanderman. He also studied piano with Ton Hartsuiker. He has performed with John Zorn, George Lewis, Han Bennink (and Bennink's group Clusone Trio as a guest), Theo Loevendie, and Gidon Kremer. He teaches at the Royal Conservatory of The Hague.

He won the Matthijs Vermeulen Award in 1984.

He composed two operas in collaboration with Friso Haverkamp and has released several CDs.

== Discography ==
- Klankast (Geestgronden, rec. 1987–1991)
- Lighter (Geestgronden, rec. 1992–1995) with Ernst Glerum, Wim Janssen
- Chamber & Solo (Geestgronden/Donemus rec. 1982–1996, ed. 1997)
- Zwik (Geestgronden, 1996–1997)
- Hollywood o.K. Pieces (Geestgronden, 2001)
- Guus Janssen, David Kweksilber (Geestgronden, 2006)
- Out of Frame (Geestgronden, 2008)
- Meeting Points (Bimhuis, 2015, with Oene van Geel, Lee Konitz, Michael Moore (jazz musician), Ernst Reijseger, Ernst Glerum, Wim Janssen, Han Bennink a.o.)
- VOSTOK Remote Islands (Relative Pitch Records, 2023) Guus Janssen, Fie Schouten, Vincent Courtois

== Festival performances ==
- Open Music '92 (Открытая Музыка-92) in Saint-Petersburg, Russia
