= One Drop of Truth =

Studio album by The Wood Brothers
- Released: February 2, 2018
- Genre: Folk
- Length: 41:32
- Label: Honey Jar Records

The Wood Brothers chronology
Paradise (2015)	One Drop of Truth (2018)

One Drop of Truth is the seventh studio album by The Wood Brothers, released on February 2, 2018.

== Reception ==
Professional ratings
Aggregate scores
Source	Rating
Metacritic	84/100
Review scores
Source	Rating
AllMusic	4/5 stars
American Songwriter	4/5 stars
Blurt	4/5 stars

The album has a rating of 84/100 on Metacritic based on 5 reviews.
