= Simulacrum (album) =

Studio album by John Zorn
- Released: March 17, 2015
- Recorded: December 2014
- Genres: Avant-garde, heavy metal, jazz
- Length: 43:07
- Label: Tzadik TZ 8330
- Producer: John Zorn

John Zorn chronology
Hen to Pan (2015)	Simulacrum (2015)	The Song Project Live at Le Poisson Rouge (2015)

Simulacrum is an album composed by John Zorn featuring John Medeski, Matt Hollenberg and Kenny Grohowski which was released on the Tzadik label in March 2015.

== Reception ==
Professional ratings
Review scores
Source	Rating
PopMatters	7/10 stars

PopMatters reviewer John Garratt stated "The album plays around with several styles and can conjure up a three-dimensional mood when it needs to, but the prevailing winds blow it into seas of heavy metal… with an organ. ...Simulacrum shows that we’re bound to mislabel something of Zorn’s even within the confines of one recording. And if that isn’t some form of creativity, then I guess I don’t know what is". Avant Music news said "Medeski brings a unique jazz and blues inflection to the mix. While Hollenberg’s guitar often takes the lead, Medeski occasionally takes over, building tense, swirling themes. Grohowski mostly avoids blast-beats, and instead relies on punctuated drumming with rapid fills. As a result, even though the 43 minutes of Simulacrum covers a variety metal tropes, albeit with organ-based atmospherics, the ultimate outcome is a fresh sound".

== Track listing ==
All compositions by John Zorn.

1. "The Illusionist" – 12:02
2. "Marmarath" – 5:18
3. "Snakes and Ladders" – 5:28
4. "Alterities" – 2:49
5. "Paradigm Shift" – 4:35
6. "The Divine Comedy" – 12:54

== Personnel ==
- John Medeski – organ
- Matt Hollenberg – guitar
- Kenny Grohowski – drums

Production

- Marc Urselli – engineer, audio mixer
- John Zorn and Kazunori Sugiyama – producers
