= Clusone Trio =

Dutch musical group

Clusone Trio, also known as Trio Clusone or Clusone 3, was a Dutch musical group active from the late 1980s to the late 1990s, composed of saxophonist/clarinetist Michael Moore, cellist Ernst Reijseger and drummer Han Bennink.

Initially planned to be a one-time collaboration for an early 1980s jazz festival in Clusone, Italy, the trio became a regular group by the end of that decade.

Their music was a blend of free improvisation and jazz, the latter typically in a post-bop or free jazz vein (but sometimes touching on swing music), and including both original compositions by the trio and interpretations of jazz standards. Additionally, their performances often featured a humorous edge due in no small part to Bennink's propensity towards quirky, slapstick humor. Somewhat unusually for a cellist, Reijseger often played pizzicato walking bass in the style of a jazz double-bassist or held and strummed the instrument like a guitar. They occasionally performed as the Clusone 4, with guests Guus Janssen on piano or Dave Douglas on trumpet.

Clusone Trio released six albums, the first two on Moore's small independent label before recording for larger labels like Grammavision or HatArt.

== Discography ==
- Clusone Trio (1992) Ramboy
- I Am an Indian (1993) Ramboy, reissued by Grammavision Records in 1995
- Soft Lights and Sweet Music: Clusone Trio Plays the Music of Irving Berlin (1994) Hat Hut Records / Hatology
- Love Henry (1996) Gramavision Records
- Rara Avis (1999) Hat Hut Records
- An Hour With... (2000) Hatology
