= David Howard Baker =

American audio engineer (1946–2004)

David Howard Baker (c. 1946 – July 14, 2004) was an American audio engineer known for his work with numerous jazz recording artists. His work with singer and pianist Shirley Horn resulted in a Grammy Award for Best Jazz Vocal Performance in 1998 for the album I Remember Miles.

== Early life and education ==
Born in Mount Vernon, New York, Baker was the son of the founder of a hi-fi systems business and made amateur recordings in his youth. During the 1960s, he recorded civil rights events, including voter-registration drives. He later trained at the Royal Conservatory of Music in Toronto and the Institute of Audio Research in New York.

== Career ==
As a engineer, Baker was associated with many record labels. In 1986, he remastered the entire Vanguard Records catalog for compact disc. Shortly before his death, he was making archival recordings for the 2003–2004 season of Jazz at Lincoln Center.
