= This Meets That =

Studio album by John Scofield
- Released: 10 September 2007 (US)(CD)
- Recorded: September 2006 – April 2007
- Studio: Avatar, New York City
- Genre: Jazz, post-bop
- Length: 64:51 (CD)
- Label: Universal Records
- Producer: John Scofield

John Scofield chronology
Out Louder (2006)	This Meets That (2007)	Piety Street (2009)

Professional ratings
Review scores
Source	Rating
AllMusic	4/5 stars
All About Jazz	5/5 stars
All About Jazz	4/5 stars
The Penguin Guide to Jazz Recordings	3/4 stars

This Meets That is a studio album by jazz musician John Scofield. Featuring longtime collaborators Steve Swallow on bass guitar and drummer Bill Stewart, along with a four piece horn section. Fellow guitarist Bill Frisell appears on one track.

== Critical reception ==
Jeff Tamarkin of All Music Guide rates it at 4 out of five stars and says, "This Meets That, as its title implies, is less of a thematic album than some of Scofield's more recent endeavors, but it's one that reminds listeners that both his chops and sense of adventure are not only intact but still growing."

== Track listing ==
All songs composed by John Scofield except where noted.

1. "The Low Road" - 4:56
2. "Down D" - 5:34
3. "Strangeness in the Night" - 7:14
4. "Heck of a Job" - 7:23
5. "Behind Closed Doors" - 5:29
6. "House of the Rising Sun"「朝日の当たる家」(Traditional) - 7:25
7. "Shoe Dog" - 8:12
8. "Memorette" - 6:35
9. "Trio Blues" - 4:16
10. "Pretty Out" - 4:31
11. "(I Can't Get No) Satisfaction"「(ゲッツ ノー)サティスファクション」 (Mick Jagger, Keith Richards) - 3:07

== Personnel ==
- John Scofield – guitars
- Bill Frisell – tremolo guitar (6)
- Steve Swallow – electric bass
- Bill Stewart – drums

Horn section

- John Scofield – arrangements
- Roger Rosenberg – baritone saxophone, bass clarinet
- Lawrence Feldman – tenor saxophone, flute
- Jim Pugh – trombone
- John Swana – trumpet, flugelhorn

=== Production ===
- John Scofield – producer
- James Farber – recording, mixing
- Justin Garrish – assistant engineer
- Brian Montgomery – assistant engineer, Pro Tools engineer
- Anthony Ruotolo – assistant engineer
- Tom Camuso – Pro Tools engineer
- Greg Calbi – mastering at Sterling Sound (New York, NY)
- Susan Scofield – production coordinator
- Tyler McDiarmid – music copyist
- Mark Hess – design
- Nick Suttle – photography
