= Let's Go Everywhere =

Studio album by Medeski Martin & Wood
- Released: January 8, 2008
- Genre: Children's music, jazz, acid jazz
- Label: Little Monster

Medeski Martin & Wood chronology
| Out Louder (2006) | Let's Go Everywhere (2008) | Zaebos: Book of Angels Volume 11 (2008) |

Professional ratings
Review scores
| Source | Rating |
|---|---|
| AllMusic | 3.5/5 stars |

Let's Go Everywhere is the 2008 ninth studio album released by Medeski Martin & Wood. This album was a departure from previous work, leaning into what the trio described as creating music from a “child's perspective”- infusing jazz with a “childlike sense of joy…” The material could be considered children’s music.

== Track listing ==
All tracks by Medeski Martin & Wood.

1. "Waking Up" – 1:05
2. "Let's Go Everywhere" – 3:33
3. "Cat Creeps" – 2:46
4. "The Train Song" – 3:53
5. "Where's the Music" – 3:14
6. "Pat a Cake" – 1:10
7. "Pirates Don't Take Baths" – 2:41
8. "Far East Sweets" – 2:53
9. "On an Airplane" – 2:15
10. "The Squalb" – 3:17
11. "Let's Go" – 2:38
12. "Old Paint" – 2:42
13. "Hickory Dickory Dock" – 1:03
14. "All Around the Kitchen" – 2:28
15. "We're All Connected" – 4:07
