= John Medeski =

American jazz keyboardist and composer

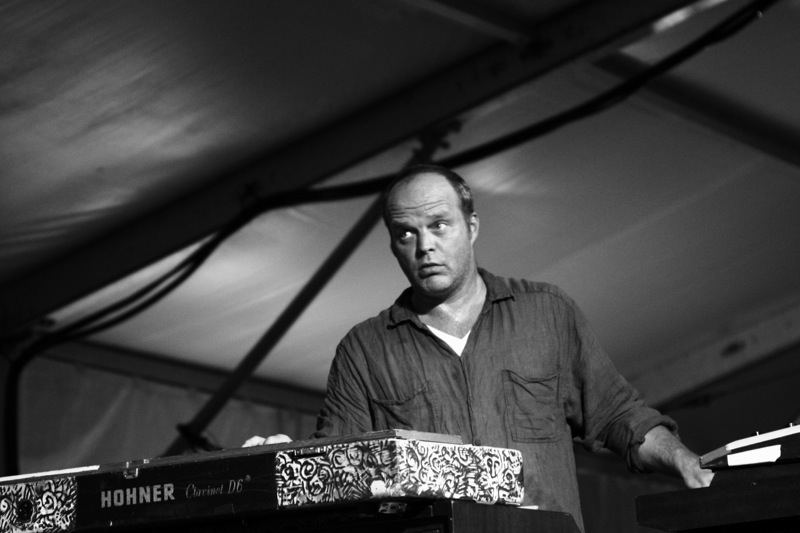
- John Medeski performing with Medeski Martin Scofield & Wood in 2007

Background information
- Born: Anthony John Medeski; June 28, 1965 (age 61); Louisville, Kentucky, United States
- Genres: Jazz, funk
- Occupations: Musician, composer
- Instruments: Keyboards, piano

Anthony John Medeski (born June 28, 1965) is an American jazz keyboard player and composer. Medeski is a veteran of New York's 1990s avant-garde jazz scene and is known popularly as a member of Medeski Martin & Wood. He plays the acoustic piano and an eclectic array of keyboards, including the Hammond B3 organ, melodica, mellotron, clavinet, ARP String Ensemble, Wurlitzer electric piano, Moog Voyager Synthesizer, Wurlitzer 7300 Combo Organ, Vox Continental Baroque organ, and Yamaha CS-1 Synthesizer, among others. When playing acoustic piano, Medeski usually plays the Steinway piano and is listed as a Steinway Artist.

== Biography ==
Medeski was born in Louisville, Kentucky, and grew up in Florida. After studying piano as a child (starting when he was five years old), he began as a teenager to perform with musicians such as Mark Murphy and Jaco Pastorius. He attended Pine Crest School. In 1983, after graduating from high school, he began studying piano at the New England Conservatory in Boston, where he performed as a sideman with Dewey Redman, Billy Higgins, Bob Mintzer, Alan Dawson. Medeski attributes his early interest in playing improvised music and jazz to listening to Oscar Peterson.

Medeski performs in a range of musical styles, from accessible groove based funk and jazz (such as the MMW albums and A Go Go with John Scofield) to more experimental music (including many of John Zorn's projects: Duras: Duchamp, Interzone, Liber Novus, Nova Express, Dreamachines, Templars: In Sacred Blood, At the Gates of Paradise etc. and collaborations with David Fiuczynski).

Medeski is best known for his work with Medeski Martin & Wood including drummer and percussionist Billy Martin and bassist Chris Wood. The trio formed in New York in 1991 playing gigs at The Village Gate. Since the mid-1990s they have toured steadily in both national and international funk, jazz, and jam music scenes. The band has collaborated with such musicians as Iggy Pop, Trey Anastasio and John Scofield.

Medeski produced and was featured on the Dirty Dozen Brass Band's 1999 release, Buck Jump. Also in 1999, he played the organ on two tracks of the Morphine album The Night.

In 2000, Medeski became a member of The Word, a bluesy gospel style project with members Robert Randolph (pedal steel) from Robert Randolph and the Family Band, brothers Luther Dickinson (guitar) and Cody Dickinson (drums), and Chris Chew (bass) of North Mississippi Allstars. The band released a self-titled album in 2001 and toured in 2001 and 2002. The band reunited in 2005 for a performance at the Bonnaroo Music Festival, and they embarked on tour again in late 2007.

He has also occasionally performed with Phil Lesh and Friends.

Medeski was a guest on Marian McPartland's Piano Jazz radio program on September 27, 2005. During the show he talked at length about his formal training on the piano, his approach to playing music, and some of the musicians that he admires the most. He performed several songs by Thelonious Monk and other composers, as well as the Medeski, Martin & Wood classic "Bubblehouse". The show was released on compact disc on April 4, 2006.

Medeski was also an inaugural member of the Independent Music Awards' judging panel to support independent artists.

On July 14, 2006, John Medeski & The Itch performed their debut gig at the All Good Music Festival in Masontown, West Virginia. The Itch consists of Eric Krasno (guitar) of Soulive and Adam Deitch (drums) with Medeski playing a B3 Organ. Also in 2006, Medeski performed with The Million Dollar Bashers for the recording of the soundtrack to the Bob Dylan biopic, I'm Not There.

In 2008, Medeski was featured on guitarist Will Bernard's Blue Plate Special album.

In 2012, Medeski was featured on progressive rock band Coheed and Cambria's albums "The Afterman: Ascension" and "The Afterman: Descension," performing piano, clavinet and synthesizer parts.

In 2016, Medeski formed the supergroup Saudade along with Chino Moreno of Deftones, Team Sleep, Palms, and Crosses; guitarist Dr. Know of Bad Brains; bassist Chuck Doom of Crosses and Team Sleep; and drummer Mackie Jayson of Cro-Mags and Bad Brains.

In 2018, Medeski formed John Medeski's Mad Skillet with two members of the Dirty Dozen Brass Band. They recorded an album in New Orleans and toured subsequently.

In 2023, Medeski composed and performed the original score for the new television series The Curse, created and written by Nathan Fielder and Benny Safdie, starring Emma Stone, Fielder and Safdie.

== Discography ==
Solo

- A Different Time (OKeh, 2013)
- John Medeski's Mad Skillet (Indirecto, 2018)
- The Curse Original Score

With Medeski Martin & Wood

- Notes from the Underground (Gramavision, 1992)
- It's a Jungle in Here (Gramavision, 1993)
- Friday Afternoon in the Universe (Gramavision, 1995)
- Shack-man (Gramavision, 1996)
- Farmer's Reserve (Indirecto, 1997)
- Bubblehouse (Gramavision, 1997)
- Combustication (Blue Note, 1998)
- Tonic (Blue Note, 2000)
- The Dropper (Blue Note, 2000)
- Electric Tonic (Indirecto, 2001)
- Uninvisible (Blue Note, 2002)
- End of the World Party (Blue Note, 2004)
- Let's Go Everywhere (Little Monster, 2008)
- The Radiolarian Series (Indirecto, 2008–2009)
  - Radiolarians 1 (Indirecto, 2008)
  - Radiolarians 2 (Indirecto, 2009)
  - Radiolarians 3 (Indirecto, 2009)
- The Stone: Issue Four (Tzadik, 2010)
- 20 (Indirecto, 2011)
- Free Magic (Indirecto, 2012) – acoustic live album, recorded 2007
- Woodstock Sessions Vol. 2 (Indirecto, 2013 [2014]) – with Nels Cline
- Omnisphere (Indirecto, 2015 [2018]) – with Alarm Will Sound Orchestra

With Medeski Scofield Martin & Wood

- Out Louder (Indirecto, 2006)
- In Case the World Changes Its Mind (Indirecto, 2011)
- Juice (Indirecto, 2014)

With Billy Martin

- Mago (Amulet, 2007)

With The Word

- The Word (Ropeadope, 2001)
- Soul Food (Vanguard Records, 2015)

With Hudson

- Hudson (Motema, 2017) - Collective group also featuring Jack DeJohnette, John Scofield, and Larry Grenadier

With David Fiuczynski

- Lunar Crush (Gramavision, 1994)

With Marian McPartland

- Marian McPartland's Piano Jazz: John Medeski (Concord, 2006)

With Pat Sansone, Robby Grant & Jonathan Kirkscey

- Mellotron Variations (Spaceflight Records, 2019)

With Club d’Elf

- Electric Moroccoland (Face Pelt Records, 2011)

=== As backing musician ===
With James Carter

- Heaven on Earth (Half Note, 2009)

With Cibo Matto

- Stereo * Type A (Warner Bros., 1999)

With Either/Orchestra

- The Half-Life of Desire (Accurate, 1990)
- The Calculus of Pleasure (Accurate, 1992)
- Across the Omniverse (Accurate, 1996)

With Béla Fleck and the Flecktones

- Outbound (Columbia, 2000)

With Bobby Previte

- Altitude (Thirsty Ear, 2007)
- Terminals (Cantaloupe, 2014)

With Marc Ribot

- The Prosthetic Cubans (Atlantic, 1998)

With Roswell Rudd

- Trombone for Lovers (Sunnyside, 2013)

With John Scofield

- A Go Go (Verve, 1998)
- Überjam (Verve, 2002)
- Überjam Deux (Emarcy, 2013)

With Spectrum Road (Tony Williams tribute project with Cindy Blackman, Jack Bruce, Vernon Reid)

- Spectrum Road (Palmetto, 2012)

With Steev Richter

- Beloved (Steev Richter, 2016)

With Surrender to the Air

- Surrender to the Air (Elektra, 1996)

With Matt Wilson

- Gathering Call (Palmetto, 2014)

With John Zorn

- Bar Kokhba (Tzadik, 1996)
- Duras: Duchamp (Tzadik, 1997)
- Zaebos: Book of Angels Vol.11 (Tzadik, 2008) – Medeski Martin & Wood
- Interzone (Tzadik, 2010)
- Dictée/Liber Novus (Tzadik, 2010)
- Nova Express (Tzadik, 2011)
- At the Gates of Paradise (Tzadik, 2011)
- Templars: In Sacred Blood (Tzadik, 2012) – with Moonchild
- A Vision in Blakelight (Tzadik, 2012)
- The Concealed (Tzadik, 2012)
- Dreamachines (Tzadik, 2013)
- On Leaves of Grass (Tzadik, 2014)
- The Last Judgment (Tzadik, 2014) - with Moonchild
- Simulacrum (Tzadik, 2015)
- The True Discoveries of Witches and Demons (Tzadik, 2015)
- Inferno (Tzadik, 2015)

With Tisziji Muñoz

- Beauty As Beauty (Anami Music, 2013)
- Beauty As Ugly (Anami Music, 2013)
- Ugly As Ugliest (Anami Music, 2013)
- Free Freedom (Anami Music, 2013)
- Parasamgate Nebula: The Death of Death (Anami Music, 2014)
- Realization of Paradox: Melting the Mind of Logic (Anami Music, 2014)
- Heart Trance Revelation (Anami Music, 2014)
- The Anniversary Concert DVD (Anami Music, 2014)
- Maha Shiva: The Razor's Healing Edge (Anami Music, 2014)
- The Heart Is The Universe DVD (Anami Music, 2014)
- Songs of Soundlessness (Anami Music, 2015)
- The Paradox of Perfection (Anami Music, 2015)
- Ensoundment Protection (Anami Music, 2015)
- Alpha Nebula Expanded: The Monster Peace (Anami Music, 2015)
- Creating Silence (Anami Music, 2015)
- Heaven Is Freedom (Anami Music, 2015)
- When Coltrane Calls! Session 1: Fierce Compassion (Anami Music, 2016)

With Auktyon

- Devushki poyut (Девушки поют) (Geometry, 2011)
