= Gramavision Records =

- Parent company: Rykodisc
- Founded: 1979
- Founder: Jonathan F.P. Rose
- Genre: Jazz
- Country of origin: U.S.
- Location: Katonah, New York

Gramavision Records is an American record label founded in 1979. Since 1994 it has been a subsidiary of Rykodisc. The label's music is largely jazz, blues and folk oriented but has touched on many other styles and genres.

In 1979, Jonathan F.P. Rose founded Gramavision in Katonah, New York. The early catalog consisted of free jazz by Ray Anderson, John Carter, Anthony Davis, and Bobby Previte; jazz fusion by John Scofield; funk by Medeski Martin & Wood; reggae by Oliver Lake; and soul by Jamaaladeen Tacuma.

After it was bought by Rykodisc, the label's headquarters moved to Salem, Massachusetts. in 1995, Gramavision released albums by Peter Apfelbaum, Bill Frisell, Ron Miles, and the Clusone Trio.

== Roster ==
- Ray Anderson
- Peter Apfelbaum
- Arditti Quartet
- Gordon Beck
- John Blake Jr.
- Vinicius Cantuária
- John Carter
- Philip Catherine
- Clusone Trio
- Anthony Davis
- Electronic Art Ensemble
- Pee Wee Ellis
- Christian Escoudé
- Aydin Esen
- Bill Frisell
- Paul Halley
- Steven Halpern
- Billy Hart
- Motohiko Hino
- Jay Hoggard
- Allan Holdsworth
- The J.B.'s
- Kitaro
- Kronos Quartet
- Oliver Lake
- Pete Levin
- Arto Lindsay
- Didier Lockwood
- Al MacDowell
- Taj Mahal
- Harry Manfredini
- John Medeski
- Medeski Martin & Wood
- Myra Melford
- Ron Miles
- Tom Mkhize
- Bob Moses
- James Newton
- Jimmy Payne
- Bobby Previte
- Cornell Rochester
- John Scofield
- Klaus Schulze
- Ralph Simon
- Harvie Swartz
- Oranj Symphonette
- Jamaaladeen Tacuma
- Bob Telson
- Kazumi Watanabe
- Bernie Worrell
- Robert Wyatt
- Yas-Kaz
- La Monte Young
