= Billy Martin (percussionist) =

American jazz drummer (born 1963)

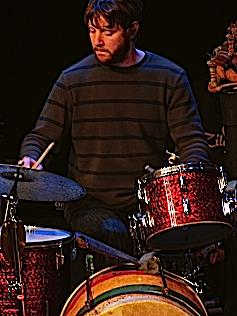
- Billy Martin performing at the 2007 Bennett Alliance Concert Series in Cambridge, Massachusetts

Background information
- Also known as: Illy B
- Born: October 30, 1963 (age 62)
- Genres: Jazz, funk
- Occupations: Musician, composer
- Instruments: Drum kit, percussion
- Years active: 1980s–present
- Website: www.billymartin.net

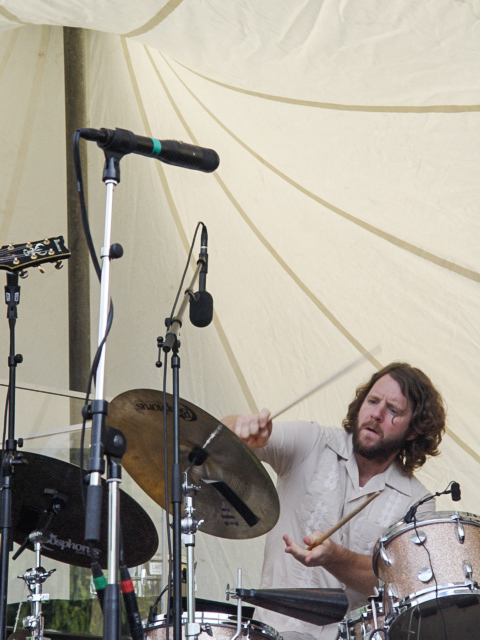
Billy Martin (Copenhagen Jazz Festival 2007)

Billy Martin (born October 30, 1963) is an American jazz drummer, best known as a member of jazz-funk trio Medeski Martin & Wood.

== Biography ==
Before becoming part of Medeski, Martin & Wood, Martin was part of the New York City Brazilian scene in the 1980s. He performed regularly with Pe De Boi, Batucada and several Bob Moses bands for over a decade. He also joined Chuck Mangione's touring group for three years. Most notably he has developed as a percussionist for The Lounge Lizards and with the John Lurie National Orchestra, and has collaborated with artists such as John Zorn, DJ Logic, Dave Burrell and Miho Hatori. He has also started his own record label, Amulet Records, specializing in eclectic percussion albums. Martin has also collaborated with Iggy Pop, Eyvind Kang, Chris Whitley, DJ Olive, Ikue Mori, John Scofield, Maceo Parker, Calvin Weston, Marty Ehrlich, and Min Xiao-Fen.

Martin also sometimes goes by the moniker Illy B. The most notable releases as Illy B include the Illy B Eats series of breakbeat records. DJ Logic convinced Martin to record a breakbeat album for DJs and other producers to use and remix. At the last minute, Martin decided to place an insert which invited remixers to submit their mixes for a follow-up compilation, Drop the Needle.

Along with his percussion work, Martin is a visual artist. He does printmaking, painting, pencil drawings, and pastel drawings, among other mediums. His work has been displayed in several galleries and is also on the packaging of many Medeski Martin & Wood albums, most notably the cover of Shack-man.

2006 was a prolific year for Martin; he created new chamber compositions for John Zorn's Tzadik label, he released Out Louder on MMW's new label Indirecto, he produced many new artworks, and published a drum book entitled Riddim: Clave of African Origin.

== on DVD ==
- "Billy Martin's LIFE ON DRUMS" (VongoleFilms.com)
- "Billy Martin IN CONCERT" (VongoleFilms.com)

== Discography ==
=== Bob Moses ===
- Visit with the Great Spirit (1983, Gramavision)
- Drummingbirds (1984, Amulet)
- The Story of Moses (1987, Gramavision)
- Time Stood Still (1993, Gramavision)

=== Ned Rothenberg ===
- Overlays (1991, Moers)
- Real and Imagined Time (1995, Moers)

=== John Lurie and the Lounge Lizards ===
- Live in Berlin Vol. 1 & 2 audio and film (1991)
- The John Lurie National Orchestra – Men with Sticks (1993)
- Get Shorty soundtrack (1995)
- Fishing with John soundtrack (1998)
- African Swim/Manny and Low soundtrack (1999)
- The Legendary Marvin Pontiac (1999)

=== Medeski Martin and Wood ===
- Notes from the Underground (1991, Amulet)
- It's a Jungle in Here (1993, Gramavision/Ryko)
- Friday Afternoon in the Universe (1995, Gramavision/Ryko)
- Get Shorty soundtrack (1995)
- Shack-man (1996, Gramavision/Ryko)
- Farmer's Reserve (1996, Indirecto/Amulet)
- Wim Wender's The End of Violence soundtrack (1997)
- Great Jewish Music: Serge Gainsbourg (1997, Tzadik)
- Great Jewish Music – Burt Bacharach (1997, Tzadik)
- Great Jewish Music: Marc Bolan (1998, Tzadik)
- Combustication (1998, Blue Note)
- Last Chance to Dance Trance (1999)
- Tonic (2000, Blue Note)
- The Dropper (2000, Blue Note)
- Uninvisible (2002, Blue Note)
- End of the World Party (2004, Blue Note)
- Voices in the Wilderness (2003, Tzadik)
- Let's Go Everywhere (2008)
- Radiolarians 1 (2008)
- Radiolarians 2 (2009)
- Radiolarians 3 (2009)
- Radiolarians: The Evolutionary Set (2009)
- The Stone: Issue Four (2010) – CD to benefit The Stone; live in Japan
- 20 (March – December 2011) – collection of tracks (released monthly); celebrating MMW's 20 year anniversary
- Free Magic (2012) – acoustic live album, recorded in 2007
- Juice (2014)

=== Iggy Pop ===
- Avenue B (1999, Virgin)

=== Oren Bloedow ===
- Luckiest Boy in the World (1998, Knitting Factory Works)

=== Chris Whitley ===
- Perfect Day (2000)

=== John Scofield ===
- A Go Go (1998, Verve)
- Out Louder (2006, Indirecto)

=== Samm Bennett and Chunk ===
- Life of Crime (1991, Knitting Factory Works)

=== As soloist and chamber music composer ===
- Starlings (2006, Tzadik)
- Black Elk Speaks (2001, Amulet)
- Solo Live Tonic (2002, Amulet)

=== Illy B Eats ===
- Illy B Eats Vol. 1 – Groove Bang and Jive Around (2001, Amulet)
- Drop the Needle (2001, Amulet)
- Antidote (2002, Amulet)
- The Turntable Sessions Vol. 1 (2002, Amulet)
- Illy B Eats Vol. 2 (Amulet)
- Illy B Eats Vol. 3 (Amulet)

=== Socket ===
- January 14 & 15 (2005, Amulet)

=== Dave Burrell ===
- Consequences (2006, Amulet)

=== G. Calvin Weston ===
- Percussion Duets (1996, Amulet)
- Houston Hall (2006, Amulet)

=== DJ Spooky ===
- Optometry (2002, Thirsty Ear)

=== DJ Logic ===
- For No One in Particular (2003, Amulet)
- Project Logic (1999, Rope-a-Dope)
- Global Noize (2008, Shanachie Recordings)

=== Healing Sound series ===
- Falling Water (1997, Amulet)

=== Wil Blades ===
- Shimmy (2012, Royal Potato Family)

=== Wicked Knee ===
- Wicked Knee (2011, Amulet)
- Heels Over Head (2013, Amulet)
