= Chris Wood (jazz musician) =

American jazz bassist

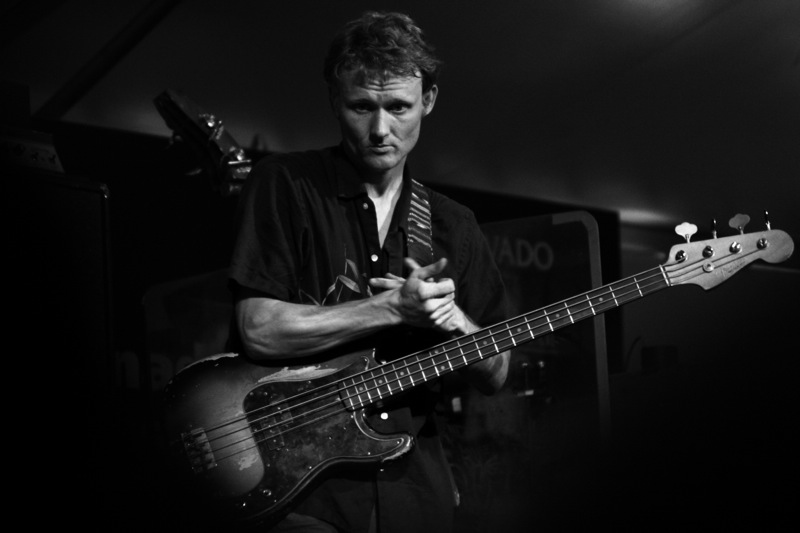
- Chris Wood performing with John Medeski, Billy Martin, and John Scofield, 2007

Background information
- Born: Christopher Barry Wood; November 25, 1969 (age 56); Boulder, Colorado, U.S.
- Genres: Jazz, jazz-funk, avant-garde jazz
- Occupations: Musician, composer
- Instruments: Double bass, bass guitar
- Years active: 1991–present
- Labels: Gramavision, Blue Note, Indirecto
- Member of: Medeski, Martin & Wood, The Wood Brothers
- Website: thewoodbros.com

Christopher Barry Wood (born November 25, 1969) is an American bassist with the jazz trio Medeski Martin & Wood and The Wood Brothers.

== Biography ==
Wood was raised in Boulder, Colorado, where he studied jazz and classical music. He attended the New England Conservatory of Music in 1989. His teachers included Geri Allen, Dave Holland, and Bob Moses. Reducing his classes, he accompanied Moses and John Medeski as sidemen for a tour, then played with them in New York City.

He formed Medeski Martin & Wood in 1991 with Medeski and Billy Martin. Wood also collaborates with his brother, Oliver Wood in the band The Wood Brothers. Medeski produced their debut album, Ways Not to Lose. He has worked with Marc Ribot, Ned Rothenberg, Marc Anthony Thompson, John Scofield, Elliott Sharp, and John Zorn.
