= What We Do =

Studio album by John Scofield Quartet
- Released: February 9, 1993
- Recorded: May 1992
- Studio: Power Station, New York City
- Genre: Jazz
- Label: Blue Note
- Producer: John Scofield

John Scofield Quartet chronology
Grace Under Pressure (1992)	What We Do (1993)	I Can See Your House from Here (1994)

Professional ratings
Review scores
Source	Rating
AllMusic	4/5 stars

What We Do is a studio album by jazz guitarist John Scofield, the second to be released as the John Scofield Quartet. It was recorded in May 1992 and released the following year on Blue Note. The quartet features saxophonist Joe Lovano, bassist Dennis Irwin (replacing Marc Johnson) and drummer Bill Stewart. Irwin had previously recorded with Scofield on the Bennie Wallace album Sweeping Through the City, and went on to play on two additional Scofield albums: Hand Jive (1994) and Groove Elation (1995).

== Track listing ==
All tracks written by John Scofield.

1. "Little Walk" – 6:34
2. "Camp Out" – 8:01
3. "Big Sky" – 6:05
4. "Easy for You" – 6:41
5. "Call 911" – 7:27
6. "Imaginary Time" – 6:08
7. "Say the Word" – 6:26
8. "Why Nogales?" – 8:15
9. "What They Did" – 7:09

== Personnel ==
- John Scofield – guitars
- Joe Lovano – tenor saxophone
- Dennis Irwin – double bass
- Bill Stewart – drums

=== Production ===
- John Scofield – producer
- James Farber – recording, mixing
- Victor Deygilo – assistant engineer
- Alan Tucker – digital editing
- Bob Ludwig – mastering at Masterdisk (New York, NY)
- Cynthia Cochrane – production coordinator
- Steve Schenfeld – project coordinator
- Susan Scofield – administrative producer, design concept
- Mark Larson – art direction
- Les Morsillo – photography
