= Quiet Fire =

Quiet Fire may refer to

- Quiet Fire (Roberta Flack album), 1971
- Quiet Fire (Frank Morgan and Bud Shank album), 1991
- Quiet Fire (George Cables album), 1995
- "Quiet Fire" a composition by George Cables which first appeared on his album Why Not, 1975
- "Quiet Fire", a song by Melody Gardot on her album Worrisome Heart, 2006
