= Keith Copeland =

American jazz musician (1946–2015)

Keith Copeland (April 18, 1946 – February 14, 2015) was a jazz drummer and music educator.

== Career ==
Copeland was born on April 18, 1946 in New York City. His father, Ray Copeland, was a jazz trumpeter, and he learned by watching him, but he decided to play drums after studying Art Blakey's records with The Jazz Messengers.

In his teens he played with Barry Harris. He later worked with the Heath Brothers, but Percy Heath disliked his style, leading to arguments and to Copeland quitting.

During his musical career, Copeland played with Sam Jones, Billy Taylor, Johnny Griffin, Stevie Wonder, Rory Stuart, George Russell, and Hank Jones. He also led his own European-based groups, including one with Irish bassist Ronan Guilfoyle.

Copeland taught at The New School University in New York City, Rutgers, and Berklee College of Music before moving to Germany in 1992 and teaching in the Hochschule system. His students include Terri Lyne Carrington, Darren Beckett and Adam Cruz.

He died on February 14, 2015 in Frankfurt, Germany.

== Discography ==
=== As leader ===
- On Target (Jazz Mania, 1993)
- The Irish Connection (SteepleChase, 1996)
- Round Trip (SteepleChase, 1997)
- Postcard from Vancouver (Jazz Focus, 1998)

=== As sideman ===
With Howard Alden

- Misterioso (Concord Jazz, 1991)

With Ben Besiakov

- You Stepped Out of a Dream (SteepleChase, 1990)

With Paul Bley

- BeBopBeBopBeBopBeBop (SteepleChase, 1990)

With Joshua Breakstone

- Echoes (Contemporary, 1987)
- Evening Star (Contemporary, 1988)
- Sittin' on the Thing with Ming (Capri, 1993)
- Remembering Grant Green (Evidence, 1993)
- The Music of Bud Powell (Double Time, 2000)
- Tomorrow's Hours (Capri, 2002)

With Charles Brown

- All My Life (Bullseye Blues, 1990)

With Chris Conner

- As Time Goes by (Enja, 1992)

With Stanley Cowell

- Sienna (SteepleChase, 1989)
- Departure #2 (SteepleChase, 1990)
- Hear Me One (SteepleChase, 1996)

With Meredith d'Ambrosio

- The Cove (Sunnyside, 1988)
- Love Is Not a Game (Sunnyside, 1991)

With John Dankworth

- Echoes of Harlem (Compendia, 1988)

With Stanton Davis

- Brighter Days (Outrageous Records Incorporated, 1977)

With Frank Foster and the SDR Big Band

- A Fresh Taste of the Blues (Intercord, 1996)

With Hugh Frasier/Jean Toussaint Quartet

- Back to Back (Jazz Focus, 1998)

With David Gazarov

- Autumnal Giant Steps (Episode Records, 1994)

With Al Grey

- Christmas Stockin' Stuffer (Capri, 1992)

With Johnny Griffin

- Return of the Griffin (Galaxy, 1978)

With Johnny Hartman

- Once in Every Life (Bee Hive, 1980)

With the Heath Brothers

- In Motion (Columbia, 1979)

With Sam Jones

- The Bassist! (Interplay, 1979)

With Mark Kirk

- Lavender Mist (Jazz Mania, 1993) with Steve Gilmore

With Ann Malcolm

- Incident'ly (Sound Hills Records, 1994)

With Susannah McCorkle

- I'll Take Romance (Concord Jazz, 1992)

With Sandy McLeod

- Conversations with Love (CGM, 2003)

With Jackie Paris

- Nobody Else but Me (Audiophile, 1988)

With Bill Pierce

- Complete William the Conqueror Sessions (Sunnyside, 1995)

With Mike Richmond

- Dance for Andy (SteepleChase) (1989)

With Bob Rockwell

- Shades of Blue (SteepleChase, 1996)

With Charlie Rouse

- The Upper Manhattan Jazz Society (Enja, 1981 [1985]) with Benny Bailey

With George Russell

- Electronic Sonata for Souls Loved by Nature (Soul Note, 1980)
- So What (Blue Note, 1987)

With Perico Sambeat

- Uptown Dance (EGT, 1992)

With Larry Schneider

- Just Cole Porter (SteepleChase, 1991)
- Blind Date (SteepleChase, 1992)
- Freedom Jazz Dance (Steeplechase, 1996)

With Jurgen Seefelder

- Naide (Westwind Records, 1996)

With Louis Smith

- Ballads for Lulu (SteepleChase, 1990)
- Once in a While (SteepleChase, 2000)

With Rory Stuart

- Hurricane (Sunnyside, 1986)

With Billy Taylor

- Where've You Been? (Concord Jazz, 1981)

With Chris Walden

- Ticino (ACT, 1996)

With Chris White

- The Chris White Project (Muse, 1992)

With Martin Wind

- Gone with the Wind (September, 1993) with Bill Mays
- Tender Waves (A Records, 1995)
