= Liquid fire =

Liquid fire may refer to:

== Warfare ==
- Greek fire, an ancient and medieval incendiary weapon
- Hot oil, an early thermal weapon
- Meng Huo You, Ancient Chinese petroleum weapon
- Flamethrower, modern incendiary weapon that projects flaming liquids
- Napalm, flammable liquids used in modern warfare

== Other uses ==
- Liquid Fire: The Best of John Scofield, a 1994 compilation album by John Scofield
- "Liquid Fire", a single by Gojira from L'Enfant Sauvage
- Liquid Fire, a declarative animation system for the Ember.js frontend framework
- Liquid Fire, a brand of drain cleaner containing sulfuric acid and an acid corrosion inhibitor
