= Dennis Irwin =

American jazz double bassist (1951–2008)

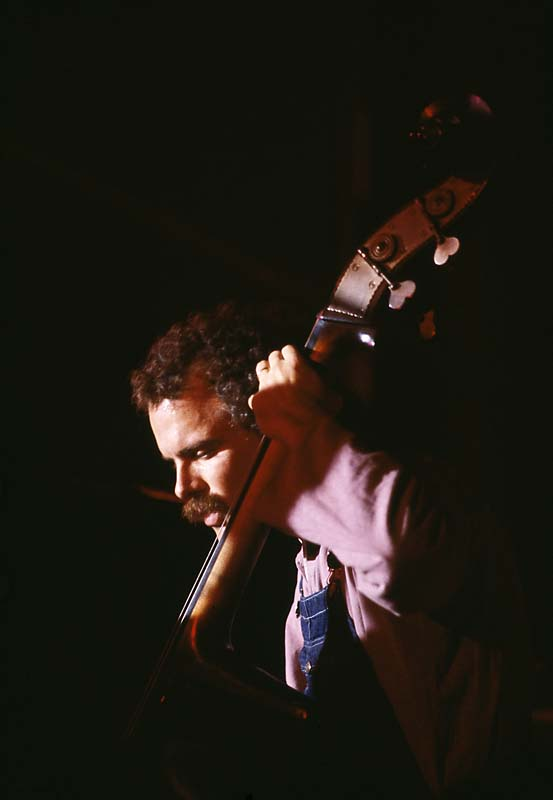
Dennis Irwin in October 1979, Umeå Jazz Festival, Sweden

Dennis Irwin (November 28, 1951 – March 10, 2008) was an American jazz double bassist. He toured and recorded with John Scofield and the Vanguard Jazz Orchestra among others, and played on over 500 albums.

== Biography ==
Irwin was born in Birmingham, Alabama. He attended North Texas State University with Norman Wisdom, studying classical music. Although he started out playing alto sax and clarinet (achieving first chair All State clarinet while at Westchester High School in Houston) he soon switched to the bass and joined the university's "Two O'Clock Lab Band."

After working with pianist Red Garland in Dallas, Irwin moved to New York. There he played with Charles Brackeen, and later landed his first steady gig in trumpeter Ted Curson's group in 1975. He accompanied such vocalists as Jackie Paris, Betty Carter, Annie Ross, Ann Hampton Callaway, Tania Maria and Mose Allison.

Influences include bassists Al Jackson Sr. and Eddie Jones. Irwin's first major recording session was in New York City on May 20 & 21, 1976, with Brazilian pianist Dom Salvador, My Family (for Muse Records). Beginning in 1977, Irwin played with Art Blakey for three years.

The Jazz Messengers recorded several of Irwin’s compositions including "Kamal." Irwin also worked with Chet Baker, Mel Lewis, Joe Lovano, Stan Getz, Johnny Griffin and Horace Silver as well as with Brazilian musicians Duduca Fonseca and Portinho. From 1992 to 1995, Irwin played with guitarist John Scofield. He can be heard on his Blue Note recordings What We Do, Hand Jive and Groove Elation.

His battle with liver cancer, which was ultimately fatal, raised awareness of jazz musicians without medical insurance. The Jazz Foundation of America and Englewood Hospital and Medical Center created the Dennis Irwin Memorial Fund to pay for cancer screenings for uninsured jazz and blues musicians.

Irwin died in Manhattan on March 10, 2008, the same day as a Jazz at Lincoln Center benefit concert in his honor featuring performances by Wynton Marsalis, Tony Bennett, and Jon Hendricks, in addition to Lovano and Scofield.

His partner was singer Aria Hendricks, daughter of Jon Hendricks. His son, Michael Irwin, is a trumpet player in New York City.

== Selected discography ==
With Art Blakey and The Jazz Messengers

- Gypsy Folk Tales (Roulette, 1977)
- Heat Wave (Pony Canyon/After Beat, 1977)
- In My Prime Vol. 1 (Timeless, 1977)
- In My Prime Vol. 2 (Timeless, 1977)
- In This Korner (Concord Jazz, 1978)
- Reflections in Blue (Timeless, 1978)
- Night in Tunisia: Digital Recording (Polygram, 1979)
- One by One (Palcoscenico, 1979 [1981])
- Works of Art (Recall, 2002)

With Joshua Breakstone

- Echoes (Contemporary, 1987)
- Self-Portrait in Swing (Contemporary, 1989)
- 9 by 3 (Contemporary, 1991)
- Walk Don't Run (King, 1992)
- Let's Call This Monk! (Double-Time, 1997)

With Curtis Fuller

- Four on the Outside (Timeless, 1978)

With Johnny Griffin

- Take My Hand (Who's Who in Jazz, 1988)
- Woe Is Me (Jazz Hour, 1988)
- The Cat (Antilles, 1990)

With Scott Hamilton

- Radio City (Concord Jazz, 1990)
- Organic Duke (Concord Jazz, 1994)
- My Romance (Concord Jazz, 1995)
- Blues Bop & Ballads (Concord Jazz, 1999)
- Ballad Essentials (Concord Jazz, 2000)

With Joe Lovano

- Tones, Shapes & Colors (Soul Note, 1985)
- 52nd Street Themes (Blue Note, 2000)
- On This Day...Live at the Vanguard (Blue Note, 2002)
- Streams of Expression (Blue Note, 2006)

With Tisziji Munoz

- Visiting This Planet (Anami)
- Hearing Voices (Anami)

With Valery Ponomarev

- Means of Identification (Reservoir, 1985 [1987])
- Trip to Moscow (Reservoir, 1987)

With John Scofield

- What We Do (Blue Note, 1992)
- Hand Jive (Blue Note, 1993)
- Groove Elation (Blue Note, 1995)
