= I Mean You =

I Mean You may refer to:

- I Mean You (composition), a composition by Thelonious Monk
- I Mean You (album), a 1993 album by George Cables
- "I Mean You", a song by Hunter Hayes from the album The 21 Project
