= Morning Song (George Cables album) =

Live album by George Cables
- Released: March 4, 2008
- Recorded: 1980
- Venue: Keystone Korner, San Francisco, CA
- Genre: Jazz
- Length: 55:13
- Label: HighNote; HCD 7182
- Producer: Joe Fields

George Cables chronology
You Don't Know Me (2007)	Morning Song (2008)	My Muse (2012)

Morning Song is a live album by pianist George Cables recorded at Keystone Korner in 1980 and released on the HighNote label in 2008.

== Reception ==
Professional ratings
Review scores
Source	Rating
AllMusic	3/5 stars
All About Jazz	4/5 stars
All About Jazz	2.5/5 stars

The AllMusic review by Thom Jurek said "Morning Song is a compelling portrait of pianist George Cables ... Cables plays solo on six of the ten cuts here ... These performances are simply stellar, and in places breathtaking. Cables is one of the great rhythmic pianists out there who seamlessly weaves the long jazz piano tradition of players like Art Tatum and Teddy Wilson into the work of more percussive and strident improvisers like Jaki Byard and even Randy Weston" but noted "the music is more than sufficient throughout, but the sequencing feels like this was pieced together from a number of performances. The sound quality in places is dodgy -- particularly on the drums, which sound all hissy, with a load of mic sheen. An ensemble tune precedes three solo numbers, then come two more group performances, followed by two more solos and ending with an ensemble tune. Joe Fields of all people should know better. The flow of this CD is uneven, jaunty, and lacks continuity. While the performances are flawless throughout and the set swings like mad, the strangeness of the dynamics make it difficult to listen to all the way through".

On All About Jazz, Terrell Kent Holmes called it " a tale of two gigs. While the quartet performances are middling, Cables' overall dynamism, particularly on his solo piano turns, lifts the disc above mediocrity" and stated "Ultimately it's Cables' piano that saves Morning Song. He mines jazz's heavier elements, fusing Bud Powell's feeling, Fats Waller's juke joint geniality and Art Tatum's quick wit into his own transformative lyricism". On the same site Jay Deshpande said "Although the commercial sound of late 70s jazz can feel dated and contrived, it is a valuable reminder of the way things were ... In 1980, Cables was at the height of his popularity. Morning Song showcases the pianist's gifts, but the track order is often ungainly ... Generally, the solo numbers on this record have much more creative potential than the quartet efforts".

== Track listing ==
All compositions by George Cables except where noted

1. "On Green Dolphin Street" (Bronisław Kaper, Ned Washington) – 7:15
2. "Who Can I Turn To?" (Leslie Bricusse, Anthony Newley) – 4:49
3. "Stroll" (Bobby Hutcherson) – 3:27
4. "I Remember Clifford" (Benny Golson) – 3:41
5. "Morning Song" – 6:42
6. "Up Jumped Spring" (Freddie Hubbard) – 6:58
7. "Little B's Poem" (Hutcherson) – 5:01
8. "As Time Goes By" (Herman Hupfeld) – 4:10
9. "Quiet Fire" – 7:42
10. "Polka Dots and Moonbeams" (Jimmy Van Heusen, Johnny Burke) – 5:28

== Personnel ==
- George Cables – piano
- Eddie Henderson – trumpet (tracks 1, 5, 6 & 9)
- John Heard - bass (tracks 1, 5, 6 & 9)
- Sherman Ferguson – drums (tracks 1, 5, 6 & 9)
