= Dark Side, Light Side =

Studio album by George Cables Trio
- Released: 1997
- Recorded: October 1996
- Studio: SteepleChase Digital Studio
- Genre: Jazz
- Length: 65:20
- Label: SteepleChase; SCCD 31405
- Producer: Nils Winther

George Cables chronology
Skylark (1995)	Dark Side, Light Side (1997)	Bluesology (1998)

Dark Side, Light Side is an album by pianist George Cables recorded in 1996 and released on the Danish label, SteepleChase.

== Reception ==
Professional ratings
Review scores
Source	Rating
AllMusic	4/5 stars
The Penguin Guide to Jazz Recordings	3.5/4 stars

Ken Dryden of AllMusic stated "This is another fine recording from George Cables' productive association with Steeplechase".

== Track listing ==
1. "Dolphin Dance" (Herbie Hancock) – 9:40
2. "Dark Side, Light Side" (George Cables) – 9:15
3. "Ruby, My Dear" (Thelonious Monk) – 7:37
4. "Alone Together" (Arthur Schwartz, Howard Dietz) – 7:25
5. "In a Sentimental Mood" (Duke Ellington) – 10:26
6. "One Finger Snap" (Hancock) – 5:12
7. "Sweet Rita Suite Part 1" (George Cables) – 7:10
8. "Ah George, We Hardly Knew You" (Don Pullen) – 8:31

== Personnel ==
- George Cables – piano
- Jay Anderson – bass
- Billy Hart – drums
