= Kenny Washington (musician) =

American jazz drummer

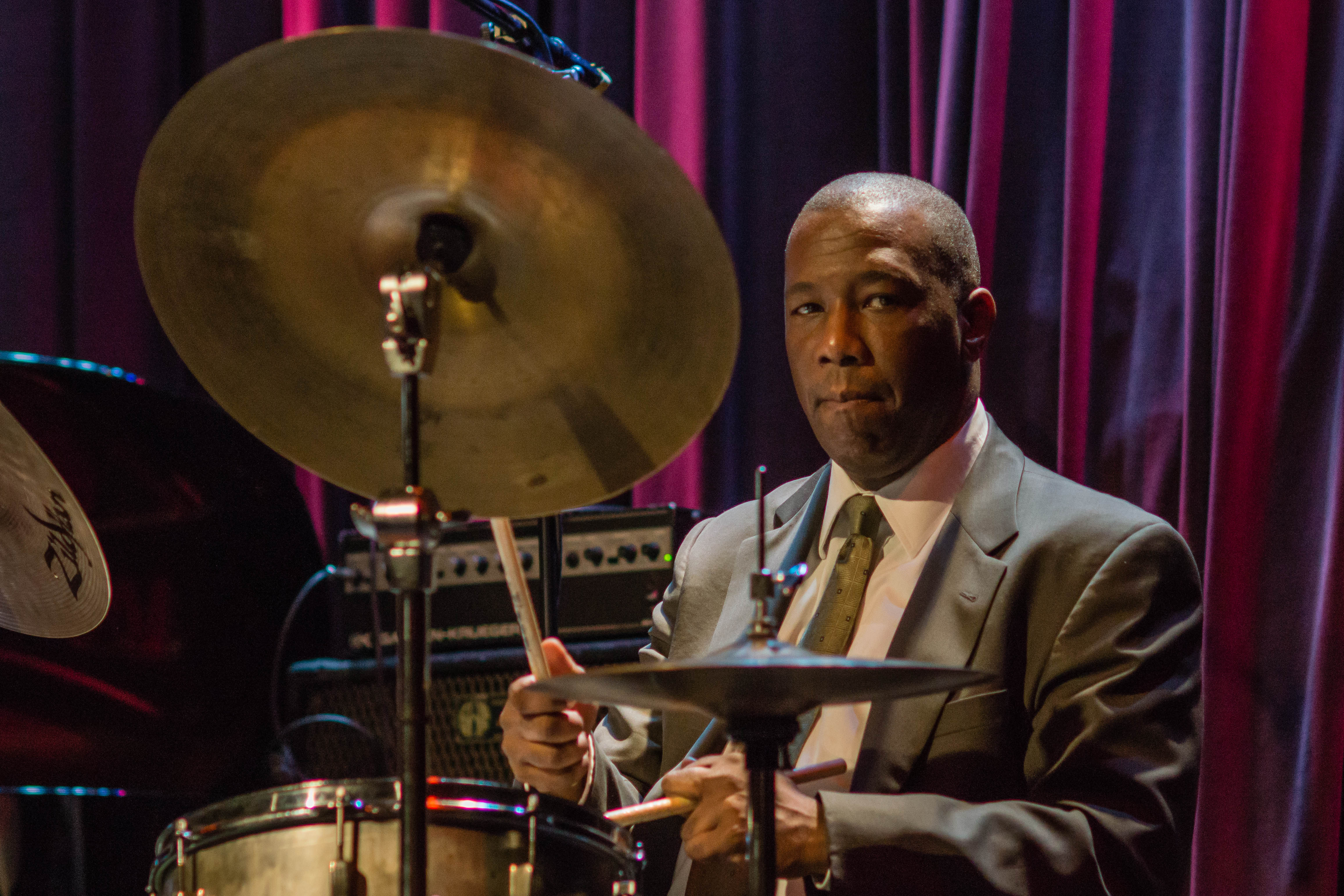

Background information
- Born: May 29, 1958 (age 68); Staten Island, New York, U.S.
- Genre: Jazz
- Occupation: Musician
- Instrument: Drums

Kenny Washington (born May 29, 1958) is an American jazz drummer and music writer born in Staten Island, New York. His brother is bassist Reggie Washington.

He grew up in the Stapleton Houses and attended P.S. 14. He studied at The High School of Music & Art, graduating in 1976. He has worked with Ronnie Mathews, Lee Konitz, Betty Carter, Johnny Griffin, Dizzy Gillespie, Clark Terry, George Cables, Benny Goodman, Lionel Hampton, Ahmad Jamal, Sonny Stitt, James Spaulding, Phil Woods, Bill Charlap, Bobby Watson, Curtis Lundy, and Tommy Flanagan. Washington serves on the faculty of SUNY Purchase and The Juilliard School. Washington's essays on contemporary and historical jazz figures have been featured in numerous jazz album releases and reissues.

== Discography ==
=== As sideman ===
With Ruby Braff

- Cape Codfather (Arbors, 2000)
- In the Wee, Small Hours in London and New York (Arbors, 2000)
- Music for the Still of the Night (Arbors, 2001)

With Joshua Breakstone

- Self-Portrait in Swing (Contemporary, 1989)
- 9 by 3 (Contemporary, 1991)
- Walk Don't Run (King, 1992)
- This Just In (Double-Time, 1999)

With Kenny Burrell

- Generation (Blue Note, 1987)
- Pieces of Blue and the Blues (Blue Note, 1988)

With George Cables

- Cables Fables (SteepleChase, 1991)

With Benny Carter

- Harlem Renaissance (MusicMasters, 1992)

With Bill Charlap

- All Through the Night (Criss Cross, 1998)
- Written in the Stars (Blue Note, 2000)
- S'Wonderful (Venus, 2002)
- Stardust (Blue Note, 2002)
- Somewhere: The Songs of Leonard Bernstein (Blue Note, 2004)
- Plays George Gershwin: The American Soul (Blue Note, 2005)
- Live at the Village Vanguard (Blue Note, 2007)
- The Silver Lining: The Songs of Jerome Kern, Tony Bennett/Bill Charlap (Columbia/Sony Music, 2015)
- Notes from New York (Impulse!, 2016)
- Uptown, Downtown (Impulse!, 2017)
- Street of Dreams (Blue Note, 2021)
- And Then Again (Blue Note, 2024)

With Teddy Edwards and Houston Person

- Horn to Horn (Muse, 1996) – recorded in 1994
- Close Encounters (HighNote, 1999) – recorded in 1994

With Dizzy Gillespie

- Bird Songs: The Final Recordings (Telarc, 1992)
- To Diz with Love (Telarc, 1992)
- To Bird with Love (Telarc, 1992)

With Benny Green

- The Place To Be (Blue Note, 1994)

With Buck Hill

- The Buck Stops Here (Muse, 1992)

With Plas Johnson and Red Holloway

- Keep That Groove Going! (Milestone, 2001)

With Randy Johnston

- Walk On (Muse, 1992)

With Etta Jones

- My Buddy: Etta Jones Sings the Songs of Buddy Johnson (HighNote, 1998)
- All the Way (HighNote, 1999)

With Lee Konitz

- Lee Konitz Nonet (Chiaroscuro, 1977)
- Jazz Nocturne (Venus/Evidence, 1994)

With Jimmy McGriff

- Feelin' It (Milestone, 2001)

With Jane Monheit

- In the Sun (2002)
- Live at the Rainbow Room (2003)

With Mingus Dynasty

- Live at the Village Vanguard (1984)
- Mingus' Sounds of Love (1988)
- Reincarnation (1997)

With Ralph Moore

- Round Trip (Reservoir, 1985 [1987])
- Images (Landmark, 1989)
- Furthermore (Landmark, 1990)

With David "Fathead" Newman

- Davey Blue (HighNote, 2002)

With Hod O'Brien

- Ridin' High (1990)
- So That's How It Is (1998)
- Live at Blues Alley: First Set (2005)
- Live at Blues Alley: Second Set (2006)
- Live at Blues Alley: Third Set (2007)

With Houston Person

- Person-ified (HighNote, 1997)
- My Romance (HighNote, 1998)

With Melvin Rhyne

- The Legend (1991)
- Boss Organ (1993)
- Mel's Spell (1996)
- Stick to the Kick (1997)
- Kojo (1999)
- Classmasters (2000)
- Tomorrow Yesterday Today (2004)

With Wallace Roney

- Munchin' (Muse, 1993)
- Crunchin' (Muse, 1993)

With Charlie Rouse

- Social Call (Uptown, 1984) with Red Rodney

With Randy Sandke

- Awakening (1998)
- Cliffhanger (2003)
- The Subway Ballet (2006)

With James Spaulding

- Brilliant Corners (Muse, 1988)
- Escapade (HighNote, 1999)

With Larry Willis

- Just in Time (SteepleChase, 1989)

With Mike LeDonne

- Bout Time (Criss Cross, 1988)
- The Feeling Of Jazz (Criss Cross, 1989)
- Common Ground (Criss Cross, 1990
- Waltz For An Urbanite (Criss Cross, 1994)
- The Heavy Hitters (Cellar Live, 2023)
- That's What's Up, The Heavy Hitters Live (Cellar Live, 2024)

With Michael Weiss

- Presenting Michael Weiss (Criss Cross, 1986)

With others

- 1983: Call It Whachawana, Johnny Griffin (Galaxy)
- 1983: Two at the Top, Frank Wess and Johnny Coles (Uptown)
- 1983: Beatitudes, Bobby Watson and Curtis Lundy (New Note)
- 1985: Means of Identification, Valery Ponomarev (Reservoir)
- 1987: Just Be Yourself, Curtis Lundy (New Note)
- 1988: Superblue, Superblue (Blue Note)
- 1989: Here's to My Lady, Phil Woods
- 1989: Jazz Poet, Tommy Flanagan
- 1989: My Man Benny, My Man Phil, Benny Carter and Phil Woods (MusicMasters)
- 1989: Live at the Theatre Boulogne-Billancourt Paris, Dameronia (Soul Note, 1994)
- 1991: What's New, Walter Bishop Jr. (DIW)
- 1991: Live at the Village Gate, Clark Terry
- 1992: Ann Hampton Callaway, Ann Hampton Callaway
- 1992: I Remember Clifford, Arturo Sandoval
- 1992: Crazy for You, John Hicks (Red Baron)
- 1992: Downtown Sounds, Grant Stewart (Criss Cross)
- 1993: Caracas, Lou Donaldson
- 1993: Joshua Redman, Joshua Redman
- 1995: Burnin' in the Woodhouse, Milt Jackson
- 1996: Gravity!!!, Howard Johnson and Gravity
- 1997: Back in New York, Doug Raney
- 1998: First Insight, Jesse Davis
- 1999: Le Grand Freddy, Freddy Cole
- 2000: Blue Suite, Gary Smulyan
- 2000: Excursions, Jim Rotondi
- 2001: Feelin' It, Jimmy McGriff
- 2001: The Promise Land, Cedar Walton (HighNote)
- 2005: Back in New York, Scott Hamilton
- 2005: Mean What You Say, Eddie Daniels
- 2007: Ain't Necessarily So, Andy Bey
- 2008: Boss Bones, Wycliffe Gordon
- 2009: A Quiet Time, Ahmad Jamal
- 2010: For the Love of You, Joe Locke
- 2019: The Music Never Stops, Betty Carter - recorded in 1992
- 2021: Samara Joy, Samara Joy
- 2023: A Joyful Holiday, Samara Joy
