= George Cables =

American jazz pianist and composer (born 1944)

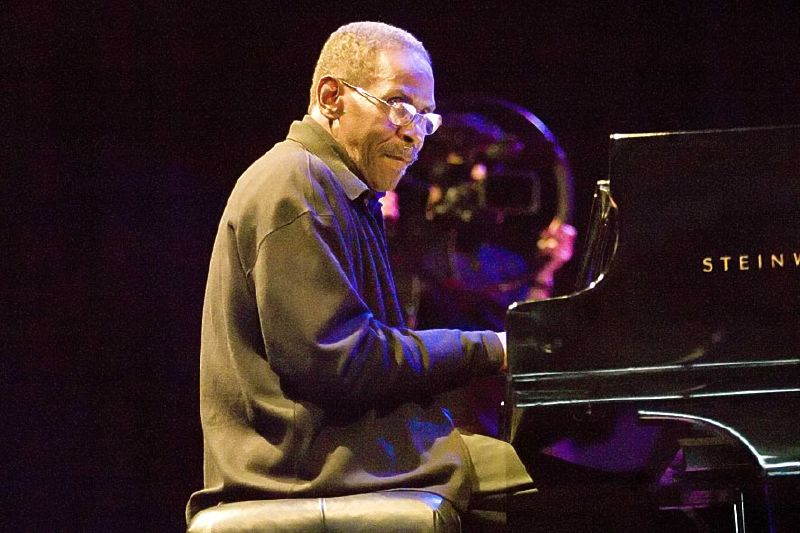
- Cables, c. 2008

Background information
- Born: George Andrew Cables; November 14, 1944 (age 81); New York City, U.S.
- Genres: Jazz
- Occupation: Musician
- Instrument: Piano
- Years active: 1961–present
- Labels: SteepleChase; Contemporary; Atlas
- Website: georgecables.com

George Andrew Cables (born November 14, 1944) is an American jazz pianist and composer.

== Early life ==
Cables was born in New York City, United States. He was initially taught piano by his mother. He then studied at the High School of Performing Arts and later at Mannes College (1963–65). He formed the Jazz Samaritans at the age of 18, a band that included Billy Cobham, Steve Grossman, and Clint Houston. Cables's early influences on piano were Thelonious Monk and Herbie Hancock.

== Later life and career ==
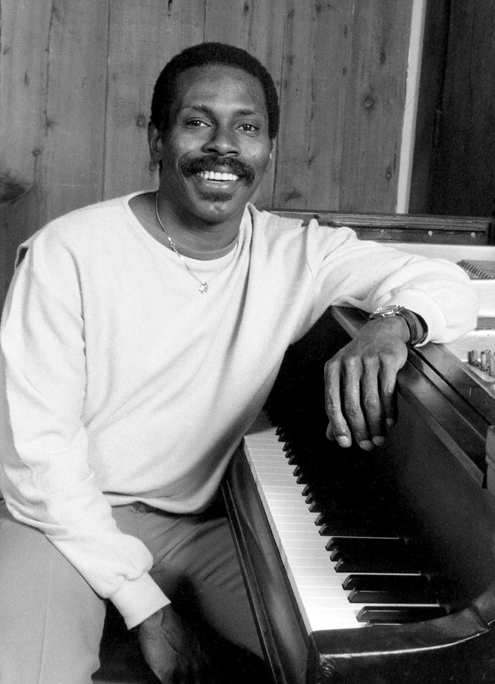
Cables in 1984

Cables has performed with Art Blakey, Sonny Rollins, Dexter Gordon, Art Pepper, Joe Henderson, Frank Morgan, and other well-established jazz musicians.

His own recordings include the 1980 Cables' Vision with Freddie Hubbard, among others. From 1983, Cables worked in the project Bebop & Beyond. He left later in the 1980s, but returned for guest appearances on two early 1990s albums, before rejoining in 1998.

Cables is a charter member of the Cookers, founded in 2010, a band which includes leading jazz composers and players Billy Harper, Eddie Henderson, David Weiss, Donald Harrison, Cecil McBee, Billy Hart, and others.

== Discography ==
=== As leader/co-leader ===
Recording date	Title	Label	Release year	Notes / Personnel
1975	Why Not	Whynot	1975	Trio; with Tony Dumas (bass), Carl Burnett (drums)
1979-03	Circle	Contemporary	1985	With Joe Farrell (flute), Ernie Watts (alto saxophone), Rufus Reid (bass), Eddie Gladden (drums)
1979-12	Cables' Vision	Contemporary	1980	With Freddie Hubbard (flugelhorn), Bobby Hutcherson (vibraphone), Tony Dumas (bass, electric bass), Peter Erskine (drums); some tracks with Ernie Watts (tenor saxophone, flute), Vince Charles (percussion) added
1980-02	Some of My Favorite Things	Atlas	1980	Trio; with Tony Dumas (bass), Billy Higgins (drums)
1980	Morning Song	HighNote	2008	Quartet; with Eddie Henderson (trumpet), John Heard (bass), Sherman Ferguson (drums); in concert
1981-02	Whisper Not	Atlas	1981	Trio; with Tony Dumas (bass), Peter Erskine (drums)
1982-01	Old Wine, New Bottle	Atlas	1982	Trio; with David Williams (bass), Carl Burnett (drums)
1982-05	Goin' Home	Galaxy	1982	Co-led duo; with Art Pepper (alto saxophone, clarinet)
1982-04, 1982-05	Tête-à-Tête	Galaxy	1983	Co-led duo; with Art Pepper (alto saxophone)
1982-12	Wonderful L.A.	Atlas	1983	Trio; with David Williams (bass), Carl Burnett (drums)
1983-05	Sleeping Bee	Atlas	1983	Trio; with Tony Dumas (bass), Ralph Penland (drums)
1984-05	The Big Jazz Trio	Eastworld	1985	Trio; with Stanley Clarke (bass), Peter Erskine (drums)
1985-05	Phantom of the City	Contemporary	1985	Trio; with John Heard (bass), Tony Williams (drums)
1986-05	Double Image	Contemporary	1987	Co-led duo; with Frank Morgan (alto saxophone)
1987-02	By George	Contemporary	1987	Some tracks solo piano, most tracks trio; with John Heard (bass), Ralph Penland (drums)
1991-03	Cables Fables	SteepleChase	1991	Trio; with Peter Washington (bass), Kenny Washington (drums)
1991-05	Night and Day	DIW	1991	Trio; with Cecil McBee (bass), Billy Hart (drums)
1991-12	Beyond Forever	SteepleChase	1992	With Joe Locke (vibraphone), Santi Debriano (bass), Victor Lewis (drums)
1993-04	I Mean You	SteepleChase	1993	Trio; with Jay Anderson (bass), Adam Nussbaum (drums)
1994-01	George Cables at Maybeck	Concord	1994	Solo piano; in concert
1994-04	Quiet Fire	SteepleChase	1995	Trio; with Ron McClure (bass), Billy Hart (drums)
1995-04	Person to Person	SteepleChase	1995	Solo piano
1995-04	Skylark	SteepleChase	1996	Trio; with Jay Anderson (bass), Albert Heath (drums)
1995-06	Alone Together	Groove Jazz	1995	Trio; with Philippe Soirat, Carlos Barretto
1996-10	Dark Side, Light Side	SteepleChase	1997	Trio; with Jay Anderson (bass), Billy Hart (drums)
1997-09	Bluesology	SteepleChase	1998	Trio; with Jay Anderson (bass), Billy Drummond (drums)
2000	One for My Baby	SteepleChase	2000	Trio; with Jay Anderson (bass), Yoron Israel (drums)
2000	New York Concerto	Meldac	2001	Trio; with George Mraz (bass), Victor Lewis (drums)
2001	Senorita de Aranjuez	Meldac	2001	Trio; with George Mraz (bass), Victor Lewis (drums)
2001	Shared Secrets	MuseFX	2001	With Bennie Maupin (bass clarinet), Gary Bartz (alto saxophone), Alphonso Johnson (bass), Abraham Laboriel (bass), Vinny Colaiuta (drums), Peter Erskine (drums)
2003-01, 2003-02	Looking for the Light	MuseFX	2003	One track solo piano, one track trio; with Peter Washington (bass), Victor Lewis (drums); most tracks quartet, with Gary Bartz (alto saxophone, soprano saxophone) added
2004-05	A Letter to Dexter	Kind of Blue	2006	Trio; with Rufus Reid (bass), Victor Lewis (drums)
2007-05	You Don't Know Me	Kind of Blue	2008	Solo piano
2012-01	My Muse	HighNote	2012	Trio; with Essiet Essiet (bass), Victor Lewis (drums)
2013-09	Icons & Influences	HighNote	2014	Trio; with Dezron Douglas (bass), Victor Lewis (drums)
2015-02	In Good Company	HighNote	2015	Trio; with Essiet Essiet (bass), Victor Lewis (drums)
2016-01, 2016-05	The George Cables Songbook	HighNote	2016	Some tracks trio, with Essiet Essiet (bass), Victor Lewis (drums); some tracks quartet, with Sarah Elizabeth Charles (vocals) added; one track quintet, with Craig Handy (tenor saxophone, flute) added; some tracks sextet, with Steven Kroon (percussion) added
2018-10	I'm All Smiles	HighNote	2019	Trio; with Essiet Essiet (bass), Victor Lewis (drums)
2020-09	Too Close for Comfort	HighNote	2021	Trio; with Essiet Essiet (bass), Victor Lewis (drums)
2024-01/05	I Hear Echoes	HighNote	2024	Trio; with Essiet Essiet (bass), Jerome Jennings (drums)

=== As member ===
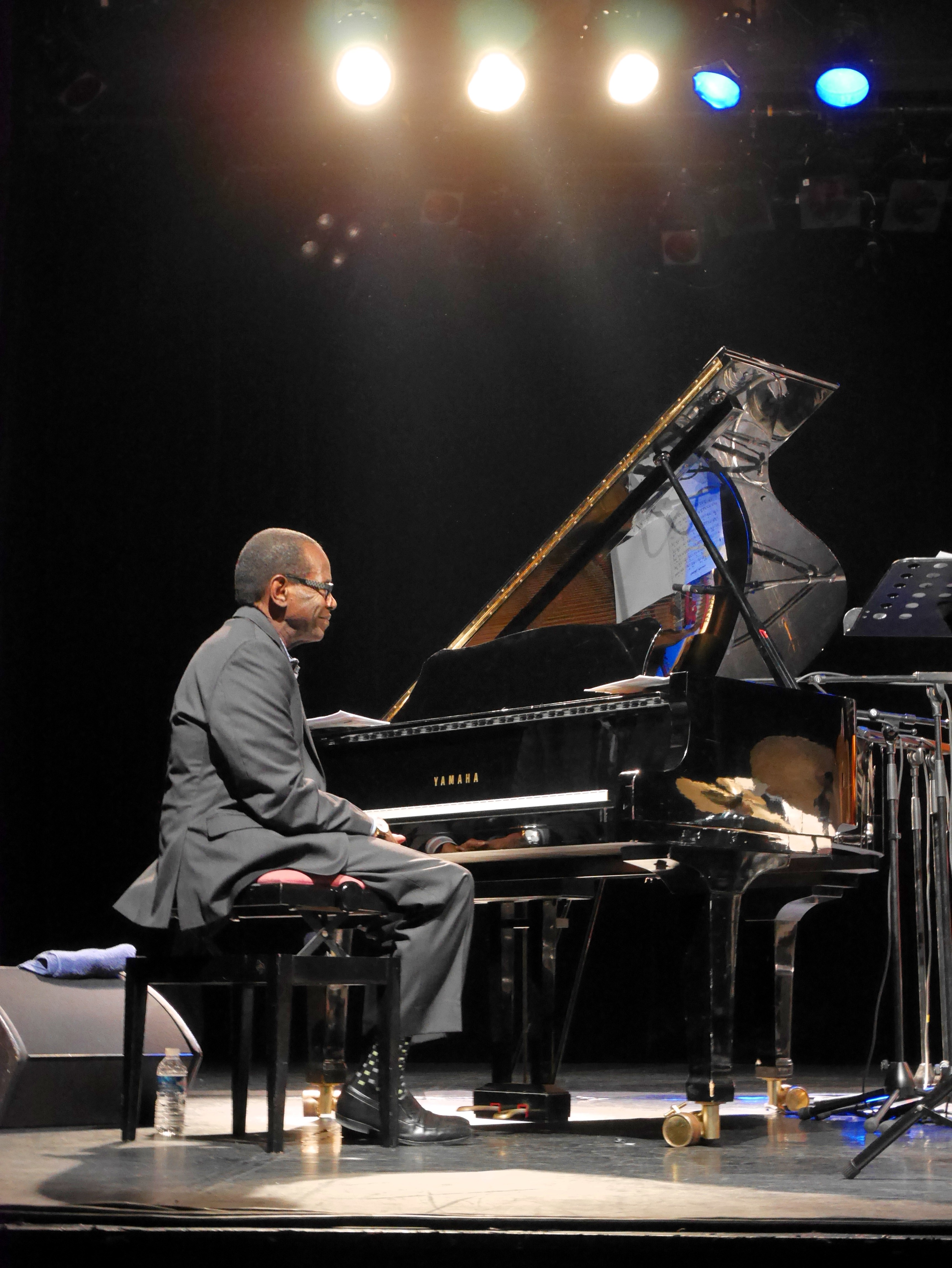
Cables with the Cookers, Nice, France, 2016

The Cookers

- Warriors (Jazz Legacy Productions, 2010)
- Cast the First Stone (Plus Loin Music / Harmonia Mundi, 2011)
- Believe (Motéma Music, 2012)
- Time and Time Again (Motéma Music, 2014)
- The Call of the Wild and Peaceful Heart (Smoke Sessions, 2016)
- Look Out! (Gearbox, 2021)

=== As sideman ===
With Roy Haynes

- Thank You Thank You (Galaxy, 1977)
- Vistalite (Galaxy, 1979) – rec. 1977

With Eddie Henderson

- Comin' Through (Capitol, 1977)
- Witness to History (Smoke Sessions, 2022)

With Joe Henderson

- If You're Not Part of the Solution, You're Part of the Problem (Milestone, 1970) – live
- In Pursuit of Blackness (Milestone, 1971)

With Freddie Hubbard

- Keep Your Soul Together (CTI, 1974) – rec. 1973
- High Energy (Columbia, 1974)
- Gleam (Columbia, 1975) – live
- Liquid Love (Columbia, 1975)
- Windjammer (Columbia, 1976)

With Bobby Hutcherson

- Waiting (Blue Note, 1976)
- Knucklebean (Blue Note, 1977)
- Highway One (Columbia, 1978)
- Conception: The Gift of Love (Columbia, 1979)
- Un Poco Loco (Columbia, 1980) – rec. 1979
- Four Seasons (Timeless, 1985) – rec. 1983
- Good Bait (Landmark, 1985) – rec. 1984

With Greg Marvin

- Taking Off! (Planet X, 1991)
- Special Edition (Planet X, 2001)

With Frank Morgan

- Mood Indigo (Antilles, 1989)
- Quiet Fire with Bud Shank (Contemporary, 1991) – rec. 1987
- A Lovesome Thing (Antilles, 1991)
- City Nights: Live at the Jazz Standard (HighNote, 2004) – rec. 2003
- Raising the Standard (HighNote, 2005) – rec. 2002
- A Night in the Life (HighNote, 2007) – rec. 2003
- Montreal Memories (Live Duo Performance) (HighNote, 2018) – rec. 1989

With Art Pepper

- The Trip (Contemporary, 1976)
- No Limit (Contemporary, 1977)
- Thursday Night at the Village Vanguard (Contemporary, 1979) – rec. 1977
- Friday Night at the Village Vanguard (Contemporary, 1979) – rec. 1977
- Saturday Night at the Village Vanguard (Contemporary, 1979) – rec. 1977
- So in Love (Artists House, 1979)
- Landscape (Galaxy, 1979)
- Besame Mucho (JVC, 1981) – rec. 1979
- Roadgame (Galaxy, 1982) – rec. 1981
- Art Lives (Galaxy, 1983) – rec. 1981
- Artworks (Galaxy, 1984) – rec. 1979
- APQ (Galaxy, 1984) – rec. 1981
- More for Les at the Village Vanguard (Contemporary, 1985) – rec. 1977
- Arthur's Blues (Galaxy, 1991) – rec. 1981
- San Francisco Samba (Contemporary, 1997) – rec. 1977
- Art Pepper: Unreleased Art, Vol. 1 (APM, 2006)

With Max Roach

- Lift Every Voice and Sing (Atlantic, 1971)
- To the Max! (Enja, 1997) – rec. 1990–1991

With Bud Shank

- Yesterday, Today and Forever with Shorty Rogers (Concord Jazz, 1983)
- California Concert with Shorty Rogers (Contemporary, 1985) – live
- That Old Feeling (Contemporary, 1986)
- Quiet Fire with Frank Morgan (Contemporary, 1991) – live rec. 1987

With Woody Shaw

- Blackstone Legacy (Contemporary, 1970)
- Song of Songs (Contemporary, 1972)
- Woody III (Columbia, 1979)

With others

- Laurie Antonioli, Soul Eyes (Catero, 1984)
- Gary Bartz, Love Song (Vee-Jay International, 1977)
- Art Blakey, Child's Dance (Prestige, 1972)
- Joe Chambers, The Almoravid (Muse, 1974)
- Joe Farrell, Sonic Text (Contemporary, 1979)
- Chico Freeman, Focus (Contemporary, 1995)
- Curtis Fuller, Crankin' (Mainstream, 1971)
- Dexter Gordon, Sophisticated Giant (Columbia, 1977)
- Dexter Gordon, Manhattan Symphonie (Columbia, 1978)
- Billy Harper, Capra Black (Strata-East, 1973)
- Philly Joe Jones, Philly Mignon (Galaxy, 1977)
- Eddie Marshall, Dance of the Sun (Muse, 1977)
- David "Fathead" Newman, Keep the Dream Alive (Prestige, 1978)
- Sonny Rollins, Next Album (Milestone, 1972)
- Charlie Rouse, Epistrophy (Landmark, 1989)
- Archie Shepp, California Meeting: Live on Broadway (Soul Note, 1987) – rec. 1985
- Bennie Wallace, Bennie Wallace in Berlin (Enja, 2002)
- Kazumi Watanabe, Lonesome Cat (Denon, 1978)
