= Bluesology (album) =

Studio album by George Cables Trio
- Released: 1998
- Recorded: September 1997
- Genre: Jazz
- Length: 69:29
- Label: SteepleChase; SCCD 31434
- Producer: Nils Winther

George Cables chronology
Dark Side, Light Side (1996)	Bluesology (1998)	One for My Baby (2000)

Bluesology is an album by pianist George Cables recorded in 1997 and released on the Danish label, SteepleChase.

== Reception ==
Professional ratings
Review scores
Source	Rating
AllMusic	3.5/5 stars

Ken Dryden of AllMusic stated "This is one of a series of excellent trio dates made by pianist George Cables for Steeplechase during his tenure with the Danish label". In JazzTimes Miles Jordan called it a "compelling and rewarding disc" and wrote "His imaginative, protean approach to music consistently rewards the listener". On All About Jazz C. Andrew Hovan said "Bluesology is a distinguished Cables affair while also being just one damn good piano trio record. The focus is mainly on standards, but what this ensemble does with them is anything but standard fare".

== Track listing ==
1. "In Your Own Sweet Way" (Dave Brubeck) – 6:50
2. "Easy Living" (Ralph Rainger, Leo Robin) – 6:41
3. "There Is No Greater Love" (Isham Jones, Marty Symes) – 5:41
4. "Voodoo Lady" (George Cables) – 5:12
5. "Come Rain or Come Shine" (Harold Arlen, Johnny Mercer) – 8:10
6. "A Night in Tunisia" (Dizzy Gillespie) – 8:00
7. "Hi-Fly" (Randy Weston) – 7:23
8. "Bluesology" (Milt Jackson) – 7:34
9. "Ebony Moonbeams" (Cables) – 9:02
10. "How Deep Is the Ocean?" (Irving Berlin) – 4:48

== Personnel ==
- George Cables – piano
- Jay Anderson – bass
- Billy Drummond – drums
