= Shared Secrets =

Studio album by George Cables
- Released: 2001
- Recorded: 2001
- Studio: Sounds On Rome, Los Angeles, CA
- Genre: Jazz
- Length: 57:01
- Label: MuseFX; MFX 1001
- Producer: Patrick Michael Murphy

George Cables chronology
New York Concerto (2001)	Shared Secrets (2001)	Looking for the Light (2003)

Shared Secrets is an album by pianist George Cables that was recorded in 2001 and released by the MuseFX label.

== Reception ==
Professional ratings
Review scores
Source	Rating
AllMusic	4/5 stars
Los Angeles Times	3.5/5 stars

The AllMusic review by Scott Yanow said "This intriguing set for pianist George Cables is in some ways a throwback to the 1970s. Although he has often played hard bop in recent times, in the '70s he was more eclectic, so he is heard on both acoustic and electric pianos. The music (all his originals except for the spiritual "Go Down Moses") is soulful and sometimes funky, hinting at 1970s fusion and pop in spots while still swinging. ... This small label release is worth searching for".

== Track listing ==
All compositions by George Cables except where noted

1. "5 Will Get Ya 10" – 6:06
2. "Blackfoot" – 5:19
3. "S.F.C.B." – 5:06
4. "Secrets of Love" – 6:33
5. "Spookarella" – 5:04
6. "Beyond Forever" – 5:58
7. "Phantom of the City" – 6:00
8. "Just Suppose" – 5:02
9. "Why Not?" – 5:37
10. "Go Down Moses" (Traditional) – 6:16

== Personnel ==
- George Cables – piano, electric piano
- Ralph Rickert – trumpet, flugelhorn
- Gary Bartz – soprano saxophone, alto saxophone
- Bennie Maupin - bass clarinet, tenor saxophone
- Larry Klimas – baritone saxophone, soprano saxophone, tenor saxophone, flute
- Alphonso Johnson, Abraham Laboriel - bass
- Vinnie Colaiuta, Peter Erskine – drums
- Luis Conte – timbales
