= Cables Fables =

Studio album by George Cables Trio
- Released: 1991
- Recorded: March 1991
- Genre: Jazz
- Length: 66:33
- Label: SteepleChase; SCCD 31287
- Producer: Nils Winther

George Cables Trio chronology
By George (1987)	Cables Fables (1991)	Night and Day (1991)

Professional ratings
Review scores
Source	Rating
AllMusic	4/5 stars
The Penguin Guide to Jazz Recordings	3.5/4 stars

Cables Fables is an album by jazz pianist George Cables and his trio, released in 1991 on SteepleChase Records.

== Track listing ==
1. "In Walked Bud" (Monk) – 6:28
2. "Lullaby" (Cables) – 5:51
3. "Waltz for Debby" (Evans, Lees) – 8:39 Erroneously titled "Waltz for Debbie" on the cover
4. "Helen's Song" (Cables) – 6:34
5. "Over the Rainbow" (Arlen, Harburg) – 12:05
6. "Just Friends" (Klenner, Lewis) – 5:48
7. "Con Alma" (Gillespie) – 8:17
8. "Sweet Rita Suite" (Cables) – 6:33
9. "All the Things You Are" (Hammerstein, Kern) – 6:18

== Personnel ==
- George Cables – piano
- Peter Washington – bass
- Kenny Washington – drums
