= Liquid Love (Freddie Hubbard album) =

Studio album by Freddie Hubbard
- Released: July 1975
- Recorded: March 18 – April 16, 1975
- Studios: Wally Heider Studios, Los Angeles, California
- Genres: Jazz; Hard bop Jazz-rock
- Length: 44:33
- Label: Columbia
- Producer: Freddie Hubbard

Freddie Hubbard chronology
Gleam (1975)	Liquid Love (1975)	Windjammer (1976)

Professional ratings
Review scores
Source	Rating
Allmusic	2/5 stars
The Rolling Stone Jazz Record Guide	1/5 stars

Liquid Love is a soul/funk influenced hard bop album recorded in 1975 by American jazz trumpeter Freddie Hubbard. The album was released in July 1975 by Columbia label.

== Track listing ==
1. "Midnight at the Oasis" (David Nichtern) - 5:30
2. "Put it in the Pocket" - 4:20
3. "Lost Dreams" (Cables) - 12:30
4. "Liquid Love" - 5:34
5. "Yesterday's Thoughts" (Benny Golson) - 3:39
6. "Kuntu" - 13:00

All compositions by Freddie Hubbard except as indicated
- Recorded in Los Angeles, March 18 - April 16, 1975

== Personnel ==
- Freddie Hubbard - trumpet, flugelhorn
- George Cables - keyboards
- Ian Underwood - Moog synthesizer
- Al Hall, Jr. - trombone
- Carl Randall, Jr. - tenor saxophone, flute
- Ray Parker Jr. - guitar
- Johnny “Guitar” Watson - guitar (2 only)
- Henry Franklin - bass
- Chuck Rainey - Fender bass (2 only)
- Carl Burnett - drums
- Spider Webb - drums (2 only)
- Myuto Correa - percussion
- Buck Clark - congas, cowbell
- Fundi - Sound Consultant

== Charts ==
Chart performance for Liquid Love
Chart (1975)	Peak position
US Billboard 200	149
US Top R&B/Hip-Hop Albums (Billboard)	21
