= You Don't Know Me (George Cables album) =

Studio album by George Cables
- Released: 2008
- Recorded: May 5–6, 2007
- Genre: Jazz
- Label: Kind of Blue

George Cables chronology
A Letter to Dexter (2006)	You Don't Know Me (2008)	Morning Song (2008)

You Don't Know Me is a solo piano album by George Cables. It was recorded in 2007 and released by Kind of Blue Records.

== Recording and music ==
AllMusic reports that the album of solo piano performances by Cables was recorded on May 5–6, 2007. The material is a mix of standards, spirituals, and Cables originals. Pieces that are typically played as ballads – "You Don't Know What Love Is", "Stella by Starlight" and "The Way We Were" – are here played at higher tempos.

== Release and reception ==
You Don't Know Me was released by Kind of Blue Records in 2008. The AllMusic reviewer wrote that it was one of Cables' best recordings. The JazzTimes reviewer described it as "the purest and most generous supply of George Cables' passionate, profuse piano ever available in one place."

== Track listing ==
=== Disc one ===
1. "My Foolish Heart"
2. "You Don't Know Me"
3. "EVC"
4. "Up Jumped Spring"
5. "You Don't Know What Love Is"
6. "Lullaby"
7. "Helen's Song"
8. "Helen's Mother's Song"
9. "Spookarella"
10. "Honey Lulu"

=== Disc two ===
1. "Here's One"
2. "Go Down Moses"
3. "Going Home"
4. "Smoke Gets in Your Eyes"
5. "Senorita de Aranjuez"
6. "Looking for the Light"
7. "Waltz for Debby"
8. "Stella by Starlight"
9. "Morning Song"
10. "Ana Marie"
11. "The Way We Were"

== Personnel ==
- George Cables – piano
