= Rory Stuart =

American jazz guitarist

- Born: January 9, 1956 (age 70); New York City
- Genres: Jazz
- Occupation: Musician
- Instrument: Guitar
- Years active: 1981–present
- Website: www.rorystuart.com

Rory Stuart (born January 9, 1956) is an American jazz guitarist. Although he has performed as a sideman with many jazz musicians, he is best known for his work as leader of groups and for his role as an educator.

== Career ==
Stuart was born in New York City, the son of famed book publisher Lyle Stuart. He was exposed to jazz during his childhood through his parents' record collection and became enthusiastic about jazz in his early teens. When he wrote a paper on Rahsaan Roland Kirk, a teacher arranged for Kirk to perform for the class at the Village Vanguard and then discuss music. During the next year, pianist Jaki Byard made weekly visits to the school's music class. Stuart started buying albums by Thelonious Monk and John Coltrane. With the help of his mother, he bought a guitar and for two years took classical lessons. He attended Stanford University, where he met guitarist Tuck Andress and studied music.

For several years Stuart lived in Boulder, Colorado, while working with Jerry Granelli, Carol Kaye, Joe Keel, Billy Tolles, and the band Parameters. He played with Oliver Johnson and Steve Potts in Paris, then went on tour with organist Jack McDuff. In the early 1980s, he moved to New York City. He has played with Geri Allen, Joe Bonner, Cecil Bridgewater, Ronnie Burrage, Jeanie Bryson, Michael Cochrane, Steve Coleman, Larry Coryell, Bill Doggett, Charles Earland, George Garzone, Vinny Golia, Billy Harper Sheila Jordan, Graham Haynes, Sheila Jordan, Ernie Krivda, Steve Nelson, Errol Parker, Mike Richmond, Charlie Rouse, Bill Saxton, Lonnie Smith, Cassandra Wilson, and Reggie Workman.

In 1982 he led a quartet that comprised Keith Copeland, Armen Donelian, and Calvin Hill and has led quartets with John Ellis and Mark Shin. He worked in a duo with Glenn Wilson. With the help of a grant from the National Endowment for the Arts, Stuart performed and recorded with an expanded version of his quartet, adding Glenn Wilson, Dannie Moore, and John Stubblefield. (National Endowment For The Arts 1992 Annual Report p. 151.) Stuart has performed with musicians in the Czech Republic (with Jaromir Honzak), Switzerland (with Colin Vallon's Trio), India (with Louiz Banks), and in Iceland. He wrote a program of music for a concert performed by former students Robert Glasper, Matt Penman, John Ellis, Jean Rohe, and Becca Stevens with guest Dafnis Prieto.

Since 1992, Stuart has led and developed the curriculum in rhythm for New School's Department of Jazz & Contemporary Music in New York. He has given private lessons, clinics, and workshops in Indian (2009 Express India, Radio and Music, Kazakhstan (U.S. Embassy News, Kazakhstan, (2008, Israel (2009–2010), Italy (Veneto Jazz in Bassano 2005-2008; also Udine and Vercelli with John Riley's Trio (2006), Austria (2003), Denmark (2008), Switzerland (2003, Brazil (2009, via Skype), Spain (2008), and across the US. (including IAJE in 2001 and 2007). He led and taught at a jazz workshop in Incheon, South Korea (2007–2008). In 2006, he was awarded the New School University Teaching Excellence Award.

== Former students ==
His students have included Taylor Ho Bynum, Robert Glasper, Aaron Goldberg, Mary Halvorson, Tigran Hamasyan, Gilad Hekselman, Ali Jackson, Gregoire Maret, Mike Moreno, Yeahwon Shin, Becca Stevens, Marcus Strickland, Nils Wogram, Sigmar Matthiasson.

== Bibliography ==
- The Jazz Guitar by Maurice Summerfield
- In the Moment by Francis Davis (DaCapo Press)
- Cadence magazine "Rory Stuart: Interview" (January 1984)
- Guitar Player magazine ("Rory Stuart Improvisor," March, 1988)
- Guitar Player magazine ("Master Series: Beyond Scales & Arpeggios," January 1989)
