= My Muse =

Studio album by George Cables
- Released: September 11, 2012
- Recorded: January 27, 2012
- Venue: Sear Sound, New York City
- Genre: Jazz
- Length: 61:12
- Label: HighNote; HCD 7244
- Producer: George Cables

George Cables chronology
Morning Song (2008)	My Muse (2012)	Icons & Influences (2014)

My Muse is an album by pianist George Cables, which he dedicated to his late wife, that was recorded in 2012 and released on the HighNote label.

== Reception ==
Professional ratings
Review scores
Source	Rating
AllMusic	4.5/5 stars
All About Jazz	4/5 stars
All About Jazz	4/5 stars

The AllMusic review by Thom Jurek said "My Muse is easily one of George Cables' outstanding releases in his extensive discography". NPR Music reviewer Kevin Whitehead stated "He's a terrific pianist, but his new album is short on flashy gestures and long on tuneful refinement. It reminds us that great jazz can be about restraint as well as abandon, about freedom within established forms ... The trio polishes its music to a high gloss, so you could underestimate it if you think jazz always needs a healthy dose of grit to stay real. My Muse is so unassumingly good, you could miss just how good it is. It gives good taste a good name".

On All About Jazz, Greg Simmons called it "a collection of uplifting and, frankly, happy-sounding originals and standards" and stated "There is a lot of great playing and terrific music on My Muse. Cables, Essiet and Lewis weave all of these sources into a seamless, well thought-out and, yes, happy-sounding album". On the same site Peter Hoetjes said "My Muse is less an elegy for love, and more of a celebration of its existence ... While he tends to simmer down his more wild, passionate turns at the piano for warmth and tenderness on this release, George Cables' sound is still recognisable, and My Muse stands out as a touching concept album in his lengthy and impressive discography".

== Track listing ==
All compositions by George Cables except where noted

1. "Lullaby" – 2:04
2. "You're My Everything" (Harry Warren, Mort Dixon, Joe Young) – 5:10
3. "You Taught My Heart to Sing" (McCoy Tyner, Sammy Cahn) – 7:12
4. "Helen's Song" – 8:28
5. "My Muse" – 5:38
6. "My One and Only Love" (Guy Wood, Robert Mellin) – 7:02
7. "But He Knows" – 5:40
8. "The Way We Were" (Marvin Hamlisch, Alan Bergman, Marilyn Bergman) – 5:46
9. "My Old Flame" (Sam Coslow, Arthur Johnston) – 6:03
10. "Hey, It's Me You're Talkin' To" (Victor Lewis) – 5:07
11. "I Loves You, Porgy" (George Gershwin, Ira Gershwin) – 3:02

== Personnel ==
- George Cables – piano
- Essiet Essiet - bass
- Victor Lewis – drums
