= Time on My Hands (John Scofield album) =

Studio album by John Scofield
- Released: April 3, 1990 (CD, LP)
- Recorded: November 19–21, 1989
- Studio: Power Station, New York City
- Genre: Jazz, post-bop
- Length: 63:19 (CD); 46:43 (vinyl)
- Label: Blue Note
- Producer: Peter Erskine; John Scofield

John Scofield chronology
Flat Out (1989)	Time on My Hands (1990)	Slo Sco:The Best of the Ballads (1990)

Professional ratings
Review scores
Source	Rating
AllMusic	3.5/5 stars
The Penguin Guide to Jazz Recordings	4/4 stars

Time on My Hands is a studio album by jazz musician John Scofield. Featuring tenor saxophonist Joe Lovano, veteran bassist Charlie Haden and drummer Jack DeJohnette. It was the first of seven studio albums Scofield released on Blue Note Records from 1990-1999. It was also the first of Scofield's records to feature Lovano, who went on to record several more quartet albums and tour with Scofield in the early 1990s.

== Track listing ==
All compositions written by John Scofield

1. "Wabash III" – 6:20
2. "Since You Asked" – 6:10
3. "So Sue Me" – 5:58
4. "Let's Say We Did" – 4:22
5. "Flower Power" – 4:57
6. "Stranger to the Light" – 7:27
7. "Nocturnal Mission" – 4:13
8. "Farmacology" – 6:40
9. "Time and Tide" – 5:48 (CD only)
10. "Be Hear Now" – 6:50 (CD only)
11. "Fat Lip" – 3:45 (CD only)

== Personnel ==
- John Scofield – guitars
- Joe Lovano – saxophones
- Charlie Haden – double bass
- Jack DeJohnette – drums

Production

- Peter Erskine – producer
- John Scofield – producer
- Michael Cuscuna – A&R direction
- Bruce Lundvall – A&R direction
- James Farber – engineer, mixing
- Gary Solomon – assistant engineer
- Bob Ludwig – mastering at Masterdisk (New York, NY)
- Matt Pierson – project coordinator
- Susan Scofield – project coordinator
- Carol Friedman – art direction, photography
- Patrick Roques – design
