= Feelin' It (album) =

Studio album by Jimmy McGriff
- Released: April 17, 2001
- Recorded: October 17 and 19, 2000
- Studio: Van Gelder Studio, Englewood Cliffs, NJ
- Genre: Jazz
- Length: 54:53
- Label: Milestone; MCD-9313-2
- Producer: Bob Porter

Jimmy McGriff chronology
McGriff's House Party (2000)	Feelin' It (2001)	McGriff Avenue (2002)

Feelin' It is an album by organist Jimmy McGriff recorded in 2000 and released on the Milestone label the following year.

== Reception ==
Professional ratings
Review scores
Source	Rating
Allmusic	3/5 stars
The Penguin Guide to Jazz Recordings	3/4 stars

Allmusic's Alex Henderson said: "McGriff was 64 when this CD was recorded in 2000 and, at that age, he wasn't trying to reinvent the wheel. But his fans expected him to provide soul-jazz/hard bop that was solid and consistent; Feelin' It definitely fits that description". Douglas Payne noted "McGriff sounds ok here, but he's sounded this way for years. There's absolutely nothing wrong with what happens here. There's absolutely nothing memorable about it either". In JazzTimes, Owen Cordle wrote "I hope there’ll always be a place for this kind of music in the record industry and on the scene. It’s a reservoir of the right stuff".

== Track listing ==
All compositions by Jimmy McGriff except where noted

1. "Stan's Shuffle" (Stanley Turrentine) – 9:01
2. "Hard Times" (Paul Mitchell) – 7:45
3. "Us" (Wayne Boyd) – 4:52
4. "Feelin' It" (Melvin Sparks) – 5:01
5. "Sermonizing" – 5:18
6. "All Blues" (Miles Davis) – 6:10
7. "Just in Time" (Jule Styne, Betty Comden, Adolph Green) – 6:03
8. "City Lights" – 7:31

== Personnel ==
- Jimmy McGriff – organ
- Bill Easley – tenor saxophone, alto saxophone
- David "Fathead" Newman – tenor saxophone (tracks 1, 2, 4 & 5)
- Ronnie Cuber – baritone saxophone (tracks 1, 2, 4 & 5)
- Wayne Boyd (tracks 3 & 6–8), Melvin Sparks (tracks 1, 2, 4 & 5) – guitar
- Kenny Washington (tracks 1, 2, 4 & 5), Don Williams (tracks 3 & 6–8) − drums
