= Gleam (album) =

Live album by Freddie Hubbard
- Released: 1975
- Recorded: March 17, 1975
- Venues: Yūbin Chokin Hall, Minato, Tokyo
- Genre: Jazz
- Label: CBS/Sony
- Producer: Keiichi Nakamura

Freddie Hubbard chronology
High Energy (1974)	Gleam (1975)	Liquid Love (1975)

Professional ratings
Review scores
Source	Rating
Allmusic	4/5 stars

Gleam (閃光, Senkou) is a live album recorded in 1975 by jazz trumpeter Freddie Hubbard. It was released as a double LP on CBS/Sony and features a live performance recorded in Tokyo by Hubbard, Carl Randall, George Cables, Henry Franklin, Carl Burnett and Buck Clark.

The selections are extended performances of material from Hubbard's recent albums "High Energy" and "Polar AC"; as well as three songs from the upcoming and as of then unrecorded album "Liquid Love". (Sessions for "Liquid Love" began the day after this concert.) In 2012 the album was released as a double cd on the Wounded Bird Records label.

== Track listing ==
1. "Put It In The Pocket" – 10:08
2. "Ebony Moonbeams" (Cables) – 12:37
3. "Betcha By Golly Wow" (Bell, Creed) – 09:37
4. "Spirits Of Trane" – 9:20
5. "Kuntu" – 22:31
6. "Midnight At The Oasis" (Nichtern) – 7:30
7. "Too High" (Wonder) – 16:40

All compositions by Freddie Hubbard except as indicated
- Recorded at the Yūbin Chokin Hall, Minato, Tokyo on March 17, 1975

== Personnel ==
- Freddie Hubbard – trumpet, flugelhorn
- George Cables – electric piano
- Carl Randall – tenor saxophone. flute
- Henry Franklin – Fender bass
- Carl Burnett – drums
- Buck Clarke – congas, percussion
