= Steve Davis (American drummer) =

American jazz drummer

- Born: 1958 (age 67–68); Santa Barbara, California, U.S.
- Genre: Jazz
- Occupation: Musician
- Instrument: Drums
- Years active: 1980–present
- Labels: DMP, Double-Time
- Website: stevedavisdrums.com

Steve Davis (born in 1958) is an American jazz drummer.

== Discography ==
=== As leader ===
- Songs We Know (DMP, 1996)
- Explorations and Impressions with Richie Beirach, Francois Moutin (Double-Time, 1997)
- Modern Days and Nights: Music of Cole Porter (Double-Time, 1997)
- Quality of Silence (DMP, 1999)
- Light with Jeanfrançois Prins (GAM, 2001)

With Lynne Arriale

- The Eyes Have It (DMP, 1994)
- When You Listen (DMP, 1995)
- With Words Unspoken (DMP, 1996)
- A Long Road Home (TCB, 1997)
- Melody (TCB, 1999)
- Live at Montreux (TCB, 2000)
- Inspiration (TCB, 2002)
- Come Together (In+Out, 2004)
- Arise (In+Out, 2004)
- Live (Motema, 2005)

=== As sideman ===
- Jamey Aebersold, Groovin' High (JA, 1988)
- Jamey Aebersold, In a Mellow Tone: Duke Ellington (JA, 1990)
- Jamey Aebersold, Vol. 50: The Magic of Miles Davis (JA, 1991)
- Joe Beck and Ali Ryerson, Alto (DMP, 1999)
- Manfredo Fest, Just Jobim (DMP, 1999)
- Monika Herzig, In Your Own Sweet Voice (Acme, 2004)
- Wolfgang Lackerschmid, Wolfgang Lackerschmid Quartet (TCB, 2015)
- Walt Weiskopf, Night Lights (Double-Time, 1995)
