= Phantom of the City =

Studio album by George Cables
- Released: 1985
- Recorded: May 14–15, 1985
- Studio: Fantasy Studios, Berkeley, California
- Genre: Jazz
- Length: 38:26
- Label: Contemporary; C 14014
- Producer: George Cables

George Cables chronology
| Cables' Vision (1980) | Phantom of the City (1985) | Circle (1986) |

Phantom of the City is an album by pianist George Cables, recorded in 1985 and released under the Contemporary label.

== Reception ==
Professional ratings
Review scores
| Source | Rating |
|---|---|
| AllMusic | 3/5 stars |
| The Penguin Guide to Jazz Recordings | 4/4 stars |

Scott Yanow of AllMusic said, "Cables has long been a talented player in what could be called the 'modern mainstream': not breaking down any new boundaries but developing his own style within the flexible boundaries of hard bop. This album is an excellent example of his talents." The Penguin Guide to Jazz describes the album as a "beautifully balanced piano trio record."

== Track listing ==
All compositions by George Cables except as indicated

1. "Phantom of the City" – 5:15
2. "Old Folks" (Dedette Lee Hill, Willard Robison) – 5:12
3. "But He Knows" – 4:35
4. "Dark Side/Light Side" – 5:20
5. "Waltz for Monday" (James Leary) – 5:45
6. "Blue Nights" – 6:43
7. "You Stepped Out of a Dream" (Nacio Herb Brown, Gus Kahn) – 5:36

== Personnel ==
- George Cables – piano
- John Heard – bass
- Tony Williams – drums
