= Two O'Clock Lab Band =

Jazz band at the University of North Texas

The Two O'Clock Lab Band is the second highest level of nine big bands (see One O'Clock Lab Band) of the Jazz Studies Division at the University of North Texas College of Music, a comprehensive music school with the largest enrollment of any music institution accredited by the National Association of Schools of Music, and oldest (and first) in the world offering a degree in jazz studies.

== History ==
While the One O'Clock is the highest level of the nine Lab Bands; the Two O'Clock has, for several decades, held acclaim as a "destination band" at the university. The Two O'Clock produces professionally engineered albums and, on concert tours, is well received. The Band has a long list of successful alumni musicians who never played with the One O'Clock, some of whom are listed below. "Making" the One O'Clock often is a matter of timing. If, for example, several talented musicians are vying for a certain chair in the One O'Clock, and that chair is held by someone for two years, then a qualified student might likely complete his or her studies playing in another Lab Band.

== Awards and honors ==
- 1992, 1993, 1994, 2005, 2006 — Down Beat Magazine poll selected the UNT Two O'Clock Lab Band as "Winner" of the Annual Student Music Awards (James Riggs, director). The band has toured and performed at Walt Disney World. National jazz radio programs, including Pandora, includes recordings from the Two O'Clock Lab Band as well as the One O'Clock.
- 2005 — The Two O'Clock Lab Band was named Down Beat Magazine's best college band for 2005
- 2010 — 33rd Downbeat Annual Student Music Awards: Large Jazz Ensemble, Graduate College Winner (Jay Saunders, Director)

== Discography ==
=== Directed by Jim Riggs ===
- The Transparent Two (Oct 4, 1994) Seafair Bolo OCLC 31772581
- Two O'Clock Jazz Band I (1997) Klavier KD 77019 OCLC 37524078
- A Salute to Benny Carter (1999) CD Klavier (K 77028) OCLC 44714474
- Two O'Clock Jazz Band II (recorded May 1997, released March 1999) CD Klavier (K 77023) OCLC 41230616
- The Translucent Two (2001) CD Klavier OCLC 50079074
- The Manne We Love: Gershwin Revisited, with the Steve Houghton Quintet (2002) CD TNC Jazz OCLC 58838861
- The Two O'Clock Jazz Band "Live"
- Avenue "C" Jazz, North Texas Jazz, 06032 JR (released 2009; but recorded by the 2005-06 band) OCLC 826866780
- The Best of the Big O (2005) CD OCLC 74146713
- Bruce Hall Jazz Music (2009) OCLC 826865973
- Denton Texas Jazz Giant, North Texas Jazz, 07052 JR OCLC 826865974

=== Directed Jay Saunders ===
- Too Two (2009) CD OCLC 501844351
- Under The Radar (2010) CD OCLC 826299225
- Two Twos (2011-2012) 2 CDS
- Kind of Two (2013) CD

== Directors ==
- Jim Riggs (retired 2008)
- Jay Saunders (fall 2008 to spring 2014. Also fall semester of 2005, when Jim Riggs was on sabbatical)
- Rodney Booth (fall 2014 to spring 2019)
- Rob Parton (fall 2019 to present)

== Notable Two O'Clock Alumni (who never played in the One O'Clock) ==
- Kirk Covington
- Michael Daugherty
- Dennis Irwin (1951–2008)

== See also ==
- One O'Clock Lab Band

Year	North Texas	Indiana
2006-07	1,649	1,638
2007-08	1,659	1,633
2008-09	1,608	1,554
2009-10	1,635	1,557
