= Echoes (Joshua Breakstone album) =

Studio album by Joshua Breakstone Quintet featuring Pepper Adams and Kenny Barron
- Released: 1987
- Recorded: February 19, 1986
- Studio: Eras Studio, New York City, NY
- Genre: Jazz
- Length: 43:56
- Label: Contemporary; C-14025
- Producer: Joshua Breakstone

Joshua Breakstone chronology
4/4 = 1 (1985)	Echoes (1987)	Evening Star (1988)

Echoes is an album by guitarist Joshua Breakstone that was recorded in 1986 and first released by the Contemporary label.

== Reception ==
Professional ratings
Review scores
Source	Rating
AllMusic	4/5 stars

In his review on AllMusic, Scott Yanow states "Guitarist Joshua Breakstone gained some initial recognition for this recording, his first for a medium-size label (following two sets for the tiny Sonora company). Breakstone welcomes two major players (baritonist Pepper Adams and pianist Kenny Barron) to a bop-oriented program ... There are fine solos all around, particularly from Pepper Adams, who only had eight months left to live. Worth searching for".

== Track listing ==
1. "Oblivion" (Bud Powell) – 6:16
2. "It's Easy to Remember" (Richard Rodgers, Lorenz Hart) – 11:00
3. "My Heart Stood Still" (Rodgers, Hart) – 5:56
4. "Even Steven" (Barry Harris) – 7:07
5. "To Monk with Love" (Harris) – 6:22
6. "Bird Song" (Thad Jones) – 7:15

== Personnel ==
- Joshua Breakstone – guitar
- Pepper Adams – baritone saxophone
- Kenny Barron – piano
- Dennis Irwin – bass
- Keith Copeland – drums
