= By George (album) =

Studio album by George Cables
- Released: 1987
- Recorded: February 27, 1987
- Studio: Berkeley, California
- Genre: Jazz
- Length: 39:15
- Label: Contemporary; C 14030
- Producer: Richard Bock

George Cables chronology
Double Image (1986)	By George (1987)	Cables Fables (1991)

By George (subtitled George Cables Plays the Music of George Gershwin) is an album of George Gershwin tunes by pianist George Cables recorded in 1987 and released on the Contemporary label. The album was Cable's third for the label and released in commemoration of the fiftieth anniversary of Gershwin's death.

== Reception ==
Professional ratings
Review scores
Source	Rating
AllMusic	4/5 stars
The Penguin Guide to Jazz	3.5/4 stars

Scott Yanow of AllMusic said "The fact that he was able to come up with fresh statements on these warhorses (and still stay melodic) says a great deal about Cables's inventiveness." The Penguin Guide to Jazz wrote that the album was "richly sophisticated, and the solo performances of 'Embraceable You' and 'Someone to Watch over Me' are excellent examples of his innate rhythmic sense."

== Track listing ==
All compositions by George Gershwin and Ira Gershwin except as indicated

1. "Bess, You Is My Woman Now" – 7:26
2. "My Man's Gone Now" (George Gershwin, DuBose Heyward) – 7:31
3. "I Got Rhythm" – 4:36
4. "Embraceable You" – 6:51
5. "Someone to Watch over Me" – 7:06
6. "A Foggy Day" – 5:53
7. "Summertime" (Gershwin, Heyward) – 4:55 Bonus track on CD reissue

== Personnel ==
- George Cables – piano
- John Heard – bass (tracks 1–3, 6 & 7)
- Ralph Penland – drums (tracks 1–3, 6 & 7)
