= A Letter to Dexter =

Studio album by George Cables
- Released: 2006
- Recorded: May 25, 2004
- Studio: Avatar (New York, New York)
- Genre: Jazz
- Length: 67:28
- Label: Kind of Blue; KOB 10006
- Producer: David Baker, Suzanne Severini

George Cables chronology
Looking for the Light (2003)	A Letter to Dexter (2006)	You Don't Know Me (2007)

A Letter to Dexter is an album by pianist George Cables, performing tunes associated with saxophonist Dexter Gordon, that was recorded in 2004 and released by the Kind of Blue label in 2006.

== Reception ==
Professional ratings
Review scores
Source	Rating
AllMusic	3.5/5 stars
All About Jazz	3/5 stars
The Penguin Guide to Jazz Recordings	4/4 stars

The AllMusic review by Rick Anderson said "Pianist George Cables, who spent some of his formative years accompanying saxophone great Dexter Gordon, pays tribute to the man with a nicely varied collection of tunes written by or associated with Gordon, A Letter to Dexter ... Cables has a decorous and romantic playing style, and combined with a rhythm section as mighty as this one, the results should be magnificent. And so they are, at least most of the time. Unfortunately, there are occasional moments when the rhythmic thread is lost and the groove falters. This usually happens during piano solos ... But most of the album is a delight ... Recommended.".

On All About Jazz, Chris May stated "There's nothing revolutionary here, but some mighty fine music and enough good vibes to make you feel happier with the world (for a while, anyway)".

== Track listing ==
All compositions by Dexter Gordon except where noted

1. "Catalonian Nights" – 7:07
2. "Three O'Clock in the Morning" (Julián Robledo) – 5:38
3. "Cheese Cake" – 5:09
4. "Polka Dots And Moonbeams" (Jimmy Van Heusen, Johnny Burke) – 8:13
5. "Tanya" (Donald Byrd) – 7:53
6. "Fried Bananas" – 4:55
7. "Body and Soul" (Johnny Green, Edward Heyman, Robert Sour, Frank Eyton) — 8:06
8. "I Told You So" (George Cables) – 4:56
9. "Who Can I Turn To?" (Anthony Newley, Leslie Bricusse) – 8:20
10. "LTD (Long Tall Dexter)" – 5:35
11. "'Round About Midnight" (Thelonious Monk, Cootie Williams, Bernie Hanighen) – 4:29

== Personnel ==
- George Cables – piano
- Rufus Reid – bass (tracks 1–10)
- Victor Lewis – drums (tracks 1–10)
