= Cables' Vision =

Studio album by George Cables
- Released: 1980
- Recorded: December 17–19, 1979
- Studios: Ocean Way Sound Recorders, Los Angeles
- Genre: Jazz
- Length: 41:32
- Labels: Contemporary; C 14001
- Producer: John Koenig

George Cables chronology
Why Not (1975)	Cables' Vision (1980)	Phantom of the City (1985)

Cables' Vision is a studio album by jazz pianist George Cables, released in 1980 by Contemporary Records and featuring trumpeter Freddie Hubbard.

== Reception ==
The AllMusic review by Scott Yanow stated: "This logically conceived and well-paced set is a gem that is highly recommended".

Professional ratings
Review scores
Source	Rating
AllMusic	4.5/5 stars
The Penguin Guide to Jazz Recordings	3/4 stars
The Rolling Stone Jazz Record Guide	4/5 stars

== Track listing ==
All compositions by George Cables except where noted.

1. "Morning Song" – 6:55
2. "I Told You So" – 9:05
3. "Byrdlike" (Hubbard) – 8:58
4. "Voodoo Lady" – 6:18
5. "The Stroll" (Hutcherson) – 4:33
6. "Inner Glow" – 5:43

== Personnel ==
- George Cables – piano, electric piano
- Freddie Hubbard – flugelhorn
- Bobby Hutcherson – vibraphone
- Ernie Watts – tenor saxophone (2, 3, 6), flute (4)
- Tony Dumas – bass, electric bass (1)
- Peter Erskine – drums
- Vince Charles – percussion (2, 4, 6)
