= Skylark (George Cables album) =

Studio album by George Cables Trio
- Released: 1996
- Recorded: April 1995
- Studio: SteepleChase Digital Studio
- Genre: Jazz
- Length: 67:21
- Label: SteepleChase; SCCD 31381
- Producer: Nils Winther

George Cables chronology
Alone Together (1995)	Skylark (1996)	Dark Side, Light Side (1996)

Skylark is an album by pianist George Cables recorded in 1995 and released on the Danish label, SteepleChase.

== Reception ==
Professional ratings
Review scores
Source	Rating
AllMusic	4/5 stars
The Penguin Guide to Jazz Recordings	3/4 stars

Ken Dryden of AllMusic stated "George Cables made a series of excellent CDs for Steeplechase during the 1990s, one of which is Skylark, a fun trio studio session".

== Track listing ==
1. "Fungii Mama" (Blue Mitchell) – 6:26
2. "Fee-Fi-Fo-Fum" (Wayne Shorter) – 9:36
3. "Manhã de Carnaval" (Luiz Bonfá) – 7:39
4. "Skylark" (Hoagy Carmichael, Johnny Mercer) – 8:20
5. "Samba de Orfeu" (Bonfá) – 7:06
6. "Someday My Prince Will Come" (Frank Churchill, Larry Morey) – 8:43
7. "A Felicidade" (Antônio Carlos Jobim) – 5:52
8. "Pannonica" (Thelonious Monk) – 6:53
9. "Dolahin" (George Cables) – 6:40

== Personnel ==
- George Cables – piano
- Jay Anderson – bass
- Albert "Tootie" Heath – drums
