= I Mean You (album) =

Studio album by George Cables Trio
- Released: 1993
- Recorded: April 1993
- Studio: SteepleChase Digital Studio
- Genre: Jazz
- Length: 65:40
- Label: SteepleChase; SCCD 31334
- Producer: Nils Winther

George Cables chronology
Beyond Forever (1992)	I Mean You (1993)	George Cables at Maybeck (1994)

I Mean You is an album by pianist George Cables recorded in 1993 and released on the Danish label, SteepleChase.

== Reception ==
Professional ratings
Review scores
Source	Rating
AllMusic	4/5 stars
The Penguin Guide to Jazz	3/4 stars

Scott Yanow of AllMusic stated, "Cables has long been underrated and he has been heard in a variety of settings through the years. This is one of his best boppish dates".

== Track listing ==
All compositions by George Cables except where noted.

1. "Woofin' and Tweetin'" (Gene Ammons) – 7:46
2. "Who Can I Turn To?" (Leslie Bricusse, Anthony Newley) – 8:59
3. "I Mean You" (Thelonious Monk) – 5:18
4. "For Heaven's Sake" (Sherman Edwards, Elise Bretton, Donald Meyer) – 8:09
5. "Blackfoot" – 7:31
6. "But He Knows" – 6:51
7. "All or Nothing at All" (Arthur Altman, Jack Lawrence) – 8:17
8. "Lush Life" (Billy Strayhorn) – 4:55
9. "Double or Nothing" – 7:30

== Personnel ==
- George Cables – piano
- Jay Anderson – bass
- Adam Nussbaum – drums
