= Slo Sco:The Best of the Ballads =

Slo Sco: The Best of the Ballads

Compilation album by John Scofield
- Released: August 21, 1990
- Recorded: 1984–1989
- Studio: A&R Recording, New York City
- Genre: Jazz
- Length: 66:36
- Label: Gramavision
- Producer: Steve Swallow, John Scofield

John Scofield chronology
Time on My Hands (1990)	Slo Sco: The Best of the Ballads (1990)	Meant to Be (1991)

Professional ratings
Review scores
Source	Rating
Allmusic	3/5 stars

Slo Sco: The Best of the Ballads is a compilation album by jazz guitarist John Scofield. The tracks on this album have been taken from previously released albums on Gramavision Records from 1984 until 1989.

== Track listing ==
1. "Still Warm"
2. "Heaven Hill"
3. "Phone Home"
4. "True Love"
5. "Time Marches On"
6. "Now She's Blonde"
7. "Spy Versus Spy"
8. "Gil B643"
9. "Thanks Again"
10. "Signature of Venus"
11. "Best Western"
12. "Evansville"

== Personnel ==
- John Scofield – guitar
- David Sanborn – alto saxophone
- Mitchel Forman – keyboards
- Robert Aries – keyboards
- Don Grolnick – keyboards
- Pete Levin – synthesizer
- Hiram Bullock – guitar
- Anthony Cox – double bass
- Gary Grainger – bass guitar
- Darryl Jones – bass guitar
- Terri Lyne Carrington – drums
- Dennis Chambers – drums
- Steve Jordan – drums
- Omar Hakim – drums
- Don Alias – percussion
