= David Shapiro (bass player) =

American musician (1952–2011)

- Born: David Shapiro; April 24, 1952; Brooklyn, New York, U.S.
- Died: February 16, 2011 (aged 58) Townshend, Vermont, U.S.
- Genres: Jazz
- Occupation: Musician
- Instrument: Double bass
- Years active: 1975–2010

David "Dave" Shapiro (April 24, 1952 – February 16, 2011) was an American jazz double bassist.

== Life ==
Born and raised in Brooklyn, David Shapiro graduated from Brooklyn College in 1973 with a Bachelor of Arts in Music. He became a busy New York freelancer, playing regularly with such jazz legends as Woody Herman, Chet Baker, Lee Konitz, Howard McGhee, Mel Lewis and singers Ray Charles, Anita O'Day, and Chris Connor. He performed with Jackie Cain and Roy Kral in the Newport Jazz Festival in Carnegie Hall. He proved his versatility as a member of the house band at Eddie Condon's and the Metropolitan Bopera House.

In 1987 Shapiro moved to Townshend, Vermont, where he taught and played with various musicians of the jazz scene in Vermont and Western Massachusetts, as Attila Zoller, Howard Brofsky, Scott Mullett, Paul Arslanian, Bob Weiner, Jay Messer, Eugene Uman, Draa Hobbs, Claire Arenius, and Tom McClung. With trumpet player Steve Sonntag he led a trio, which became later a sextet. In 1997 they recorded the live album Monk, Duke & Mingus Shapiro also played in recording sessions with Woody Herman (World Class, 1982), Danny D'Imperio (Blues For Philly Joe, 1991), Joshua Breakstone (Evening Star, 1988), Howard Brofsky (73 Down, 2000), and Michael Musillami (Perception, 2000).

Shapiro taught math and jazz history at Westfield State College and at Holyoke Community College in Massachusetts. He instituted his own educational programs and conducted jazz ensembles. He also taught Jazz History at the Vermont Jazz Center and conducted the "piano trio" ensembles at the VJC's Summer Jazz Workshop.

== Death ==
On February 16, 2011, Shapiro was found frozen to death in his home. His death certificate states the manner of death was an accident, “due to cold environmental temperatures.” An autopsy was done and determined the cause of death to be “atherosclerotic cardiovascular disease and psychiatric illness (type unspecified),” with no further details, although he apparently had a history of erratic behavior and severe psychiatric problems during the last years of his life and, as a result, had been hospitalized several times. At the time his body was discovered, there was no heat in his house and his phone had been turned off.
