= Quiet Fire (George Cables album) =

Studio album by George Cables Trio
- Released: 1995
- Recorded: April 1994
- Studio: SteepleChase Digital Studio
- Genre: Jazz
- Length: 57:19
- Label: SteepleChase; SCCD 31357
- Producer: Nils Winther

George Cables chronology
George Cables at Maybeck (1994)	Quiet Fire (1995)	Person to Person (1995)

Quiet Fire is an album by pianist George Cables recorded in 1994 and released on the Danish label, SteepleChase.

== Reception ==
Professional ratings
Review scores
Source	Rating
AllMusic	4/5 stars
The Penguin Guide to Jazz	3/4 stars

Ken Dryden of AllMusic stated: "George Cables primarily focuses on jazz compositions in this 1994 trio session ... Highly recommended". The Penguin Guide to Jazz wrote that "Quiet Fire is lovely: a cracking group and a riveting choice of material".

== Track listing ==
1. "Uncle Bubba" (Gary Bartz) – 6:18
2. "Quiet Fire" (George Cables) – 5:41
3. "My Ship" (Kurt Weill, Ira Gershwin) – 9:54
4. "Fried Bananas" (Dexter Gordon) – 7:20
5. "Waltz for Monday" (James Leary) – 8:06
6. "You Stepped Out of a Dream" (Nacio Herb Brown, Gus Kahn) – 5:56
7. "Naima's Love Song" (John Hicks) – 7:07
8. "The Decrepit Fox" (Freddie Hubbard) – 6:53

== Personnel ==
- George Cables – piano
- Ron McClure – bass
- Billy Hart – drums
