= Self-Portrait in Swing =

Self Portrait in Swing

Studio album by Joshua Breakstone Quartet featuring Kenny Barron
- Released: 1989
- Recorded: January 18, 1989
- Studio: Van Gelder Studio, Englewood Cliffs, NJ
- Genre: Jazz
- Length: 57:06 CD release with additional tracks
- Label: Contemporary; C-14050
- Producer: Joshua Breakstone

Joshua Breakstone chronology
Evening Star (1988)	Self Portrait in Swing (1989)	9 by 3 (1990)

Self Portrait in Swing is an album by American jazz guitarist Joshua Breakstone that was recorded in 1989 and released by the Contemporary label.

== Reception ==
Professional ratings
Review scores
Source	Rating
AllMusic	4.5/5 stars

In his review on AllMusic, Scott Yanow states "Throughout his series of recordings for Contemporary, Joshua Breakstone consistently showed that he was one of the top bop-based guitarists to emerge in the 1980's, playing in the tradition of Charlie Christian, Tal Farlow, Barney Kessel, Herb Ellis and Kenny Burrell. ... Breakstone (who tosses in the oddest song quotes at times) sounds relaxed at each of the tempoes, the rhythm section is beyond criticism and the release overall is a flawless bop date".

== Track listing ==
1. "Self Portrait in Swing" (Joshua Breakstone) – 7:09
2. "Count Your Blessings (Instead of Sheep)" (Irving Berlin) – 8:42
3. "Will You Still Be Mine?" (Tom Adair, Matt Dennis) – 5:10
4. "Salisway" (Breakstone) – 5:09 Additional track on CD release
5. "Some Enchanted Evening" (Richard Rodgers, Oscar Hammerstein II) – 7:14
6. "If Ever I Would Leave You" (Frederick Loewe, Alan Jay Lerner) – 10:16
7. "Don't Take Your Love from Me" (Henry Nemo) – 6:18
8. "Personality" (Jimmy Van Heusen, Johnny Burke) – 7:08 Additional track on CD release

== Personnel ==
- Joshua Breakstone – guitar
- Kenny Barron – piano
- Dennis Irwin – bass
- Kenny Washington – drums
