= Grace Under Pressure (John Scofield album) =

Studio album by John Scofield
- Released: 1992
- Recorded: December 1991
- Studio: Power Station, New York City
- Genre: Jazz
- Length: 63:05
- Label: Blue Note
- Producer: Steve Swallow; John Scofield

John Scofield chronology
Meant To Be (1990)	Grace Under Pressure (1992)	What We Do (1993)

Professional ratings
Review scores
Source	Rating
AllMusic	4/5 stars
The Penguin Guide to Jazz Recordings	3.5/4 stars

Grace Under Pressure is a studio album by jazz guitarist John Scofield. It features fellow guitarist Bill Frisell, bassist Charlie Haden and drummer Joey Baron. Five of the ten tracks also feature a brass trio led by Randy Brecker.

== Track listing ==
All tracks composed by John Scofield.

1. "You Bet" - 5:33
2. "Grace Under Pressure" - 8:23
3. "Honest I Do" - 4:23
4. "Scenes from a Marriage" - 8:50
5. "Twang" - 6:09
6. "Pat Me" - 5:59
7. "Pretty Out" - 7:10
8. "Bill Me" - 8:37
9. "Same Axe" - 3:01
10. "Unique New York" - 5:00

== Personnel ==
- John Scofield – electric guitar
- Bill Frisell – electric guitar, acoustic guitar
- Charlie Haden – bass
- Joey Baron – drums

Horns (Tracks 3, 5, 6, 8 & 10)

- Michael Gibbs – arrangements
- John Scofield – arrangements
- Jim Pugh – trombone
- Randy Brecker – flugelhorn
- John Clark – French horn

Production

- Steve Swallow – producer
- John Scofield – co-producer
- James Farber – recording, mixing
- Chris Albert – assistant engineer
- Bob Ludwig – mastering at Masterdisk (New York, NY)
- Susan Scofield – administrative producer
- Cynthia Cochrane – production coordinator
- Steve Schenfeld – project coordinator
- Mark Larson – art direction, design
- Penny Gentieu – photography

== See also ==
- Marc Johnson, Bass Desires (1986)
