= In Good Company (George Cables album) =

Studio album by George Cables
- Released: June 23, 2015
- Recorded: February 10, 2015
- Venue: Systems Two, Brooklyn, NY
- Genre: Jazz
- Length: 62:21
- Label: HighNote; HCD 7275
- Producer: George Cables

George Cables chronology
Icons & Influences (2014)	In Good Company (2015)	The George Cables Songbook (2016)

In Good Company is an album by pianist George Cables that was recorded in 2015 and released on the HighNote label.

== Reception ==
In JazzTimes, Michael J. West called it " a cheery swinger, an exemplar of mainstream piano jazz. In short, the kind of record Cables always makes".

== Track listing ==
All compositions by George Cables except where noted

1. "After the Morning" (John Hicks) – 8:39
2. "Mr. Anonymouse" – 5:03
3. "Naima's Love Song" (Hicks) – 6:51
4. "It Don't Mean a Thing (If It Ain't Got That Swing)" (Duke Ellington, Irving Mills) – 4:36
5. "Lotus Blossom" (Billy Strayhorn) – 8:17
6. "Love You Madly" (Ellington) – 6:29
7. "EVC" – 6:24
8. "Lush Life" (Strayhorn) – 8:12
9. "Voyage" (Kenny Barron) – 5:57
10. "Day Dream" (Ellington, Strayhorn) – 1:53

== Personnel ==
- George Cables – piano
- Essiet Essiet - bass
- Victor Lewis – drums
