= High Energy (Freddie Hubbard album) =

Studio album by Freddie Hubbard
- Released: Summer 1974, probably August
- Recorded: April 29–May 2, 1974
- Studios: Sunset Sound Recorders, Los Angeles
- Genre: Jazz
- Length: 40:59
- Labels: Columbia; KC 33048
- Producer: Paul Rothchild

Freddie Hubbard chronology
Polar AC (1973)	High Energy (1974)	Gleam (1975)

Professional ratings
Review scores
Source	Rating
Allmusic	3/5 stars
The Rolling Stone Jazz Record Guide	1/5 stars
DownBeat	4.5/5 stars

High Energy is a studio album recorded in 1974 by jazz trumpeter Freddie Hubbard. It was first studio album released on the Columbia label and features performances by Hubbard, Joe Sample, George Cables, Junior Cook, Ernie Watts, Pete Christlieb, and Ian Underwood.

== Reception ==
AllMusic's Scott Yanow commented One of Freddie Hubbard's few decent efforts during his very commercial period with Columbia, this LP found his quintet (with tenor-saxophonist Junior Cook and keyboardist George Cables) joined by a small orchestra and a string section on a set of potentially dismal material."

Eric Kriss of DownBeat wrote: "Hubbard's use of a large band and heavily orchestrated parts is interesting, especially since the entire LP was recorded "live" without overdubs or effects."

== Track listing ==
1. "Camel Rise" (George Cables) - 6:21
2. "Black Maybe" (Wonder) - 4:55
3. "Baraka Sasa" (Hubbard) - 10:26
4. "Crisis" (Hubbard) - 5:45
5. "Ebony Moonbeams" (Cables) - 6:57
6. "Too High" (Wonder) - 6:35

== Personnel ==
- Freddie Hubbard: trumpet, flugelhorn
- Junior Cook: tenor saxophone (6), flute
- Dick "Slyde" Hyde, George Bohanon: trombone
- Pete Christlieb: tenor saxophone (6), bass clarinet (5)
- Ernie Watts: bass flute (1), flute (6), soprano saxophone (5)
- Dean Parks: guitar
- George Cables: electric piano
- Joe Sample: clavinet, organ
- Ian Underwood: synthesizer
- Kent Brinkley: bass
- Harvey Mason (2, 4), Ralph Penland (1, 3, 5–6): drums
- Victor Feldman, King Errison, Carmelo Garcia: percussion
- Dale Oehler: arrangements, conducting

== Charts ==
Chart performance for High Energy
Chart (1974)	Peak position
US Billboard 200	153
US Top R&B/Hip-Hop Albums (Billboard)	23
