= Icons & Influences =

Studio album by George Cables
- Released: January 21, 2014
- Recorded: September 16, 2013
- Venue: Systems Two, Brooklyn, NY
- Genre: Jazz
- Length: 72:45
- Label: HighNote; HCD 7255
- Producer: George Cables

George Cables chronology
My Muse (2012)	Icons & Influences (2014)	In Good Company (2015)

Icons & Influences is an album by pianist George Cables that was recorded in 2013 and released on the HighNote label early the following year.

== Reception ==
Professional ratings
Review scores
Source	Rating
AllMusic	3.5/5 stars
All About Jazz	4.5/5 stars

The AllMusic review by Matt Collar said "As with all of Cables' albums, Icons & Influences is a fluid, urbane album full of engaging modern jazz".

On All About Jazz, Jack Bowers stated "on the trio date Icons and Influences Cables warmly salutes a number of those who have helped frame his musical persona and escorted him along a journey of wonder and discovery that has enabled him to become the superbly talented artist he is today ... Dedications aside, this is a splendid trio session led by one of the jazz world's more proficient and accessible contemporary pianists. Full credit to Cables, Douglas and Lewis for a job well done".

== Track listing ==
All compositions by George Cables except where noted

1. "Cedar Walton" – 4:34
2. "Farewell Mulgrew" – 6:48
3. "Happiness" – 6:25
4. "The Duke" (Dave Brubeck) – 7:24
5. "Come Sunday" (Duke Ellington) – 7:04
6. "Little B's Poem" (Bobby Hutcherson) – 6:35
7. "Nature Boy" (eden ahbez) – 6:56
8. "Very Early" (Bill Evans) – 6:29
9. "Isotope" (Joe Henderson) – 5:12
10. "The Very Thought of You" (Ray Noble) – 6:31
11. "Mo' Pan" (Aldwyn Roberts) – 5:31
12. "Blue Heart" (Benny Golson) – 2:38

== Personnel ==
- George Cables – piano
- Dezron Douglas - bass
- Victor Lewis – drums
