= Jim Riggs =

American saxophonist, band director, and educator

James Garland Riggs (born July 28, 1941) is an American saxophonist in classical and jazz idioms, big band director, collegiate music educator, and international music clinician. He is also a University of North Texas Regents Professor Emeritus .

== Career ==
=== As performer ===
As a University of North Texas student (1969–72) Riggs performed with the University of North Texas One O'Clock Lab Band. Riggs performed regularly with the Dallas Symphony Orchestra and the Ft. Worth Symphony Orchestra.

Riggs also appeared as a jazz soloist with the United States Navy Commodores in Washington, D.C.

Riggs is the leader and founder of The Official Texas Jazz Orchestra, a Dallas-based ensemble dedicated to performing state of the art large jazz ensemble music. Riggs has conducted All-State Jazz Bands in Michigan, Ohio, Oklahoma, Kentucky, Tennessee. Riggs has appeared as a featured performer and clinician at Jazz Festivals throughout the USA and Sweden. As a freelance artist he has performed with Frank Sinatra, Ella Fitzgerald, Tony Bennett, Nancy Wilson, Henry Mancini, Ray Charles and Nelson Riddle. He is a prolific studio recording artist.

=== As educator ===
Until his retirement in August 2008, Riggs had been professor in the Jazz Studies and Performance Divisions of University of North Texas College of Music where he had taught applied saxophone, directed the Two O'Clock Lab Band, and taught Jazz Style and Analysis. Riggs joined the North Texas faculty in the fall of 1973. Riggs has instructed many prominent alumni of the Jazz Studies program at North Texas.

Riggs directed the Two O'Clock Lab Band while coordinating the world's largest enrollment of saxophone students. The Two O'Clock Lab Band was named "winner" in Downbeat Magazine's "Annual Student Music Awards" in 1994, 1997, 2001, 2006 and 2008. He has produced many national and international award-winning saxophonists, including first-place winners and finalists in the North American Saxophone Alliance Young Artist Competition, semifinalists in the Thelonious Monk International Jazz Saxophone Competition (Luis Hernandez 2002; Dave Pietro 1991 & 1996; Clay Pritchard 2013), and winners in Down Beat Magazine Student Music Solo Awards.

Riggs former students hold teaching and performing positions in numerous colleges and universities throughout the United States and in elite military bands in Washington, D.C. His students hold first call professional playing positions across the globe including Hamburg, New York City and Los Angeles.

== Publications ==
- James Garland Riggs, An analysis of Jacques Ibert's Concertino da Camera for alto saxophone and eleven instruments (1972); OCLC 44099873

== Selected discography ==
As Director of the Two O'Clock Lab Band, University of North Texas College of Music

- The Transparent Two, Seafair Bolo Archived 2009-07-12 at the Wayback Machine BSCD 8006-2 (1994); OCLC 31772581
- Two O'Clock Jazz Band I, Klavier K 77019 Archived 2013-01-16 at the Wayback Machine
- A Salute To Benny Carter, CD Klavier (K 77028) Archived 2013-01-16 at the Wayback Machine (1999); OCLC 704944523
- Two O'Clock Jazz Band II (recorded May 1997, released March 1999) CD Klavier (K 77023) Archived 2013-01-16 at the Wayback Machine
- The Translucent Two, North Texas Jazz, Klavier Archived 2013-01-16 at the Wayback Machine (2001); OCLC 50079074
- The Manne We Love: Gershwin Re-Visited, Cambria, CD TNC Jazz 5882 Archived 2010-12-08 at the Wayback Machine (2001); OCLC 58838861
- The Best of the Big "O", North Texas Jazz, 0003 JR (2005); OCLC 74146713
- Avenue "C" Jazz, North Texas Jazz, 06032 JR (2007); OCLC 826866780
- Bruce Hall Jazz Music, North Texas Jazz, 07032 JR (2008); OCLC 826865973
- Denton Texas, Jazz Giant, North Texas Jazz, 07052 JR (2009); OCLC 826865974
- Airstream Artistry - Jim Riggs' Best of the Two Archived 2020-07-29 at the Wayback Machine, UNT Store

Other recordings

- Annual Fall Concert of the Lab Bands (7 Lab Bands at North Texas), North Texas Jazz (Nov 25, 1969)
- Lab '70! Home concerts, Germany, National College Jazz Festival, Switzerland (1970)
- Lab! Annual Spring concert of the Lab Bands (April 14, 1970)
- North Texas State University Lab Bands: Annual Spring Combo Concert, Century (April 21, 1970)
- Live! The North Texas Lab Bands, Fall and Spring concerts, 1970/1971, Precision (1970)
- Lab 72! 25 years respect for jazz education; North Texas State University, Precision (1972)
- One O'Clock Lab Band at The National College Jazz Festival, University of Illinois (1972)
- Live! ('72-'73) (One O'Clock Lab Band), (recorded Nov. 21, 1972 & Apr. 20, 1973)
- Groovey, James Riggs, Rich Matteson, Phil Wilson, Bengt Hallberg, Jack Petersen, Red Mitchell, Egil Johansen, Four Leaf Clover Records, FLC 5060 (1981)
- Kneedeep in Paradise Jim CaJacob and Friends, (1998)
- The Never Ending Blues, "The Lou Fisher Big Band," Mark Records, MJS-57625
- The Legend, The Lou Fisher Big Band (1980)
- Royal Street, The Lou Fisher Big Band, Sea Breeze SB 2012 (1983)
- Playin' In the Park, Pete Petersen And The Collection Jazz Orchestra (1985)
- Ghost Train Triptych for wind symphony Archived 2023-03-11 at the Wayback Machine, North Texas Wind Symphony (1996)
- Texas Times Archived 2020-07-29 at the Wayback Machine Jim Riggs & Stefan Karlsson (2018)
- Theme for the Lonely Man Archived 2023-03-11 at the Wayback Machine Jim Riggs, baritone saxophone - composed and arranged by Mike Smith (2020)
- Riggs Rags, SaxeTexaS Saxophone Quartet, James Riggs, Lee Pulliam, James Ogilvy, Terry Steele (2007)
