= Looking for the Light (George Cables album) =

Studio album by George Cables
- Released: October 21, 2003
- Recorded: January 27–February 1, 2003
- Studio: Jerry Kalaf's Studio, Studio City, CA and Sound on Sound Studios, New York, NY
- Genre: Jazz
- Length: 57:49
- Label: MuseFX; MFX 1005
- Producer: Patrick Michael Murphy

George Cables chronology
Shared Secrets (2001)	Looking for the Light (2003)	A Letter to Dexter (2006)

Looking for the Light is an album by pianist George Cables that was recorded in 2003 and released by the MuseFX label.

== Reception ==
Professional ratings
Review scores
Source	Rating
AllMusic	4/5 stars

The AllMusic review by Scott Yanow said "The music is both thoughtful and swinging ... Recommended".

On All About Jazz, C. Michael Bailey stated "Looking for the Light is the result of some introspection on the part of Cables, who has not been in good health recently. Mr. Cables composed eight of the disc’s ten songs. All of his compositions are swinging but have a thoughtful air about them ... George Cables is as solid a pianist as one can hope to hear. Let us hope for his complete return to health and much, much more music like this". On the same site, Andrew Rohan noted "The hallmark of his writing and arranging here is quietude, even when the proceedings are swinging. The compositions boast fetching melodies wedded to harmonies that encourage the soloists. There is an organic progression from theme statements to and through the solos, leading back to the themes. Still, each song has its own unique personality".

== Track listing ==
All compositions by George Cables except where noted

1. "Looking for the Light" – 7:12
2. "Klimo" – 5:19
3. "Senorita de Aranjuez" – 6:54
4. "Alice Brown" – 5:10
5. "Will You Still Love Me Tomorrow?" (Gerry Goffin, Carole King) – 7:13
6. "Tasshi's Night Out" – 3:39
7. "Mr. Baggy Pants" – 5:35
8. "Gymnopedie" (Erik Satie) – 6:12
9. "E.V.C." – 6:23
10. "Helen's Mothers Song" – 4:12

== Personnel ==
- George Cables – piano
- Gary Bartz – soprano saxophone, alto saxophone
- Peter Washington - bass
- Victor Lewis – drums
