= 9 by 3 =

Studio album by Joshua Breakstone Trio
- Released: 1991
- Recorded: October 30, 1990
- Studio: Van Gelder Studio, Englewood Cliffs, NJ
- Genre: Jazz
- Length: 39:11
- Label: Contemporary; C-14062
- Producer: Joshua Breakstone

Joshua Breakstone chronology
Self-Portrait in Swing (1989)	9 by 3 (1991)	Walk Don't Run (1992)

9 by 3 is an album by guitarist Joshua Breakstone that was recorded in 1990 and first released by the Contemporary label.

== Reception ==
Professional ratings
Review scores
Source	Rating
AllMusic	4/5 stars
The Indianapolis Star	3.5/4 stars

The Indianapolis Star wrote that Breakstone "does well sticking to melodic invention for the most part, though he taxes the listener's patience in taking such ballads as Thelonious Monk's 'Pannonica' and 'Where or When' past the eight-minute mark."

In his review on AllMusic, Scott Yanow states: "Breakstone, whose musical path has been consistent since his early days, sticks to bop on a program including two originals, a few standards, and songs by Bud Powell and Thelonious Monk ... All of Joshua Breakstone's recordings thus far are worth getting by straight-ahead jazz fans".

== Track listing ==
1. "Ki5-3444" (Joshua Breakstone) – 3:55
2. "Where or When" (Richard Rodgers, Lorenz Hart) – 8:33
3. "I Talk to the Trees" (Frederick Loewe, Alan Jay Lerner) – 7:19
4. "All Alone" (Irving Berlin) – 5:13
5. "Moment I Knew" (Breakstone) – 5:36
6. "John's Abbey" (Bud Powell) – 3:21
7. "Medley: Monk's Mood/Pannonica" (Thelonious Monk) – 12:44
8. "Day by Day" (Axel Stordahl, Paul Weston, Sammy Cahn) – 5:14

== Personnel ==
- Joshua Breakstone – guitar
- Dennis Irwin – bass
- Kenny Washington – drums
