= The George Cables Songbook =

Studio album by George Cables
- Released: October 7, 2016
- Recorded: January 13 & May 6, 2016
- Venue: Systems Two, Brooklyn, NY
- Genre: Jazz
- Length: 62:21
- Label: HighNote; HCD 7292
- Producer: George Cables

George Cables chronology
In Good Company (2015)	The George Cables Songbook (2016)

The George Cables Songbook is an album by pianist George Cables that was recorded in 2016 and released on the HighNote label.

== Reception ==
In JazzTimes, Mike Joyce said "Even pianist George Cables’ most devoted followers are apt to be surprised by this collection of original compositions. The surprise is not so much by the quality of the writing, as Cables’ credentials are unassailable, but by the freshness, appeal and promise heard in this new collaboration with singer and lyricist Sarah Elizabeth Charles. In Charles, Cables has found a musical soulmate who is profoundly attuned to his repertoire and playing".

== Track listing ==
All compositions by George Cables except where noted

1. "Traveling Lady" – 6:22
2. "AKA Reggie" – 7:26
3. "The Dark the Light" (lyrics by Sarah Elizabeth Charles) – 6:49
4. "For Honey Lulu" (lyrics by Charles) – 5:49
5. "Melodious Funk" – 6:27
6. "Face the Consequences" (lyrics by Charles) – 5:20
7. "Colors of Light" (lyrics by Charles) – 8:42
8. "Think on Me" (lyrics by Janice Jarrett) – 5:55
9. "The Mystery of Monifa Brown" – 7:55
10. "Baby Steps" – 6:19
11. "Suite for Sweet Rita" (lyrics by Charles) – 5:43

== Personnel ==
- George Cables – piano
- Essiet Essiet – bass
- Victor Lewis – drums
- Sarah Elizabeth Charles – vocals (tracks 3, 4, 6–8 & 11)
- Craig Handy – saxophones, flute (tracks 3, 4, 6 & 8)
- Steve Kroon – percussion (tracks 3, 4 & 8)
