= Evening Star (Joshua Breakstone album) =

Studio album by Joshua Breakstone featuring Tommy Flanagan and Jimmy Knepper
- Released: 1988
- Recorded: December 11, 1987
- Studio: Van Gelder Studio, Englewood Cliffs, NJ
- Genre: Jazz
- Length: 50:33
- Label: Contemporary; C-14040
- Producer: Bob Porter

Joshua Breakstone chronology
Echoes (1987)	Evening Star (1988)	Self-Portrait in Swing (1989)

Evening Star is an album by guitarist Joshua Breakstone that was recorded in 1990 and first released by the Contemporary label.

== Reception ==
Professional ratings
Review scores
Source	Rating
AllMusic	4.5/5 stars

In his review on AllMusic, Scott Yanow states "guitarist Joshua Breakstone utilizes two well-respected veterans (trombonist Jimmy Knepper and pianist Tommy Flanagan) on a quintet set, along with two younger players ... The guitarist's single-note solos often make him seem like a horn player, so he never clashes with the pianist. It is a special treat getting to hear the under-recorded Jimmy Knepper stretching out".

== Track listing ==
1. "The Thumb" (Wes Montgomery) – 7:10
2. "I Know Why" (Harry Warren, Mack Gordon) – 6:51
3. "The Way You Look Tonight" (Jerome Kern, Dorothy Fields) – 8:13
4. "Child's Play" (Joshua Breakstone) – 7:12
5. "Evening Star" (Benny Carter) – 7:29
6. "Just Open Your Heart" (Barry Harris) – 7:39

== Personnel ==
- Joshua Breakstone – guitar
- Jimmy Knepper – trombone
- Tommy Flanagan – piano
- David Shapiro – bass
- Keith Copeland – drums
