= Senorita de Aranjuez =

Studio album by George Cables
- Released: 2001
- Recorded: June 18–19, 2001
- Studio: The Studio, NYC
- Genre: Jazz
- Length: 60:33
- Label: Meldac Jazz; MECJ-2011
- Producer: Makoto Kimata, Todd Barkan

George Cables chronology
One for My Baby (2000)	Senorita de Aranjuez (2001)	New York Concerto (2001)

Senorita de Aranjuez is an album by pianist George Cables that was recorded in 2001 and released by the Japanese Meldac jazz label.

== Reception ==
Professional ratings
Review scores
Source	Rating
AllMusic	2.5/5 stars

The AllMusic review by Judith Schlesinger said "this one is surprisingly tame. There are some intriguing inventions ... but more often these three excellent musicians seem less than fully challenged by the material ... there's more desert than oasis. Not anyone's best CD".

== Track listing ==
1. "It Could Happen to You" (Jimmy Van Heusen, Johnny Burke) – 4:58
2. "Senorita de Aranjuez" (George Cables) – 5:41
3. "Gymnopedie #1" (Erik Satie) — 7:03
4. "Black Orpheus" (Luiz Bonfá) – 6:07
5. "Spring Can Really Hang You up the Most" (Tommy Wolf, Fran Landesman) – 7:17
6. "Unchained Melody" (Alex North, Hy Zaret) – 7:55
7. "It's Impossible" (Armando Manzanero, Sid Wayne) – 7:00
8. "The Summer Knows" (Michel Legrand, Alan Bergman, Marilyn Bergman) – 5:08
9. "All the Things You Are" (Jerome Kern, Oscar Hammerstein II) – 5:09
10. "Sweet Rita Suite" (Cables) – 5:21

== Personnel ==
- George Cables – piano
- George Mraz - bass
- Victor Lewis – drums
