= One for My Baby (George Cables album) =

Studio album by George Cables
- Released: 2000
- Recorded: April 2000
- Genre: Jazz
- Length: 66:39
- Label: SteepleChase; SCCD 31487
- Producer: Nils Winther

George Cables chronology
Bluesology (1998)	One for My Baby (2000)	Senorita de Aranjuez (2001)

One for My Baby is an album by pianist George Cables recorded in 2000 and released on the Danish label, SteepleChase.

== Reception ==
Professional ratings
Review scores
Source	Rating
AllMusic	4/5 stars
The Penguin Guide to Jazz Recordings	3/4 stars

Ken Dryden of AllMusic stated "George Cables draws from a variety of standards and jazz compositions by well-known composers for this 2000 trio date".

== Track listing ==
1. "Drop Me Off in Harlem" (Duke Ellington) – 8:59
2. "Virgo" (Wayne Shorter) – 7:33
3. "My Foolish Heart" (Victor Young, Ned Washington) – 9:09
4. "I Should Care" (Axel Stordahl, Sammy Cahn, Paul Weston) – 9:20
5. "Capricious" (Billy Taylor) – 5:47
6. "Emily" (Johnny Mandel, Johnny Mercer) – 6:43
7. "Anna Maria" (Shorter) – 9:00
8. "One for My Baby" (Harold Arlen, Johnny Mercer) – 10:04

== Personnel ==
- George Cables – piano
- Jay Anderson – bass
- Yoron Israel – drums
