= Circle (George Cables album) =

Studio album by George Cables
- Released: 1985
- Recorded: March 27–29, 1979
- Studio: Contemporary's Studio, Los Angeles, CA
- Genre: Jazz
- Length: 40:21
- Label: Contemporary; C 14015
- Producer: John Koenig

George Cables chronology
Phantom of the City (1985)	Circle (1985)	Double Image (1986)

Circle is a studio album by jazz pianist George Cables, recorded in 1979 but not released until 1985 by Contemporary Records.

== Reception ==
The AllMusic review by Ken Dryden stated, "This LP is primarily a showcase for Cables' compositions... The only disappointing track is 'Thank You, Thank You', with the leader switching to electric piano and clavinet for a brisk but rather dated-sounding funk piece that leans toward what would eventually be called smooth jazz. But one dud is hardly a reason to avoid making a search for this rewarding LP".

Professional ratings
Review scores
Source	Rating
AllMusic	3/5 stars
The Penguin Guide to Jazz Recordings	3/4 stars

== Track listing ==
All compositions by George Cables except where noted.

1. "I Remember Clifford" (Benny Golson) – 6:18
2. "Beyond Forever" – 7:09
3. "Thank You, Thank You" – 4:52
4. "The Phantom" – 8:45
5. "Circle" – 6:14
6. "Love Song" – 7:05

== Personnel ==
- George Cables - piano, electric piano, clavinet
- Joe Farrell – flute (tracks 2 & 4)
- Tony Dumas (track 3), Rufus Reid (tracks 1, 2 & 4–6) - bass
- Peter Erskine (track 3), Eddie Gladden (tracks 1, 2 & 4–6) - drums
