= Person to Person (George Cables album) =

Studio album by George Cables Trio
- Released: 1995
- Recorded: April 5, 1995
- Studio: SteepleChase Digital Studio, Ganlese, Denmark
- Genre: Jazz
- Length: 62:27
- Label: SteepleChase; SCCD 31369
- Producer: Nils Winther

George Cables chronology
Quiet Fire (1994)	Person to Person (1995)	Alone Together (1995)

Person to Person is a solo album by pianist George Cables recorded in 1995 and released on the Danish label, SteepleChase.

== Reception ==
Professional ratings
Review scores
Source	Rating
AllMusic	4/5 stars
The Penguin Guide to Jazz	4/4 stars

Ken Dryden of AllMusic stated "This 1995 session for Steeplechase is one of the rare times where he had a chance to record as a solo pianist". The Penguin Guide to Jazz described the album as "an immaculate solo performance that has melody at a premium and never for a moment drifts off into chordal side-roads."

== Track listing ==
All compositions by George Cables except where noted.

1. "My Funny Valentine" (Richard Rodgers, Lorenz Hart) – 6:16
2. "I Told You So" – 3:29
3. "Sweet Rita Suite" – 9:12
4. "Blue Nights" – 5:37
5. "A Foggy Day" (George Gershwin, Ira Gershwin) – 4:36
6. "I Remember Clifford" (Benny Golson) – 5:36
7. "On Green Dolphin Street" (Bronisław Kaper, Ned Washington) – 3:26
8. "Love Song" – 5:41
9. "In a Sentimental Mood" (Duke Ellington) – 3:56
10. "In Walked Bud" (Thelonious Monk) – 3:24
11. "Polka Dots and Moonbeams" (Jimmy Van Heusen) – 4:57
12. "Body and Soul" (Johnny Green) – 6:10

== Personnel ==
- George Cables – piano
