= Joshua Breakstone =

American jazz guitarist

- Born: July 22, 1955 (age 70) Elizabeth, New Jersey, U.S.
- Genres: Jazz
- Occupation: Musician
- Instrument: Guitar
- Years active: 1977–present
- Labels: Contemporary, Double-Time, Capri
- Website: joshuabreakstone.com

Joshua Breakstone (born July 22, 1955) is an American jazz guitarist.

Joshua Breakstone came into contact with the music business early in life through his parents and siblings. His sister was a lighting technician at the Fillmore East theater, where he saw musicians such as Jimi Hendrix and Frank Zappa. Later, he became interested in jazz and was influenced by Charlie Parker and Lee Morgan. He studied with guitarist Sal Salvador in Manhattan. In 1972, he enrolled at the New College of the University of South Florida and graduated three years later. He continued his studies at Berklee College of Music.

After living in Brazil for a few months, he returned to New York City, where he performed and taught. In 1979, he recorded with Canadian saxophonist Glen Hall, with Joanne Brackeen, Cecil McBee, and Billy Hart participating. Until 1983, when he recorded his debut album, he worked with Vinnie Burke, Warne Marsh, Emily Remler, and Aaron Bell. He taught privately and at the Rhode Island Conservatory of Music. In 1983 Breakstone recorded his first album as leader Wonderful! that was released on Sonora Label in 1984 and featured Barry Harris on piano. The recording was followed by 4/4= 1 also on the Sonora Label and featuring Kenny Barron on piano.

Beginning in 1986, Breakstone recorded four albums for Contemporary Records, with sidemen including Pepper Adams, Kenny Barron, Dennis Irwin, Jimmy Knepper, Tommy Flanagan, Keith Copeland, and Kenny Washington. In 1986 he went on his first tour of Japan. Since then, Breakstone has played twice a year in Japan. He has worked with Terumasa Hino, Monkey Kobayashi, and Eiji Nakamura. In 1991, he signed a contract with the Japanese label King Records, which released four albums: Walk Don't Run (with interpretations of Shadows and Ventures numbers such as "Telstar" and "Apache") and I Want to Hold Your Hand and Oh! Darling, two albums with Beatles compositions.

On Remembering Grant Green (Evidence, 1996), he worked with organist Jack McDuff and the drummer Al Harewood, who had been sidemen for guitarist Grant Green. His album Sittin' on the Thing with Ming (Capri, 1994) contained many of his compositions. He followed that album with tributes to Thelonious Monk, Wes Montgomery, and Bud Powell. He recorded A Jamais (Capri, 2004) with French musicians Louis Petrucciani and Joël Allouche. In 2005, the album Memoirs - The French Sessions, Vol. 2 was produced in France.

== Discography ==
| Year recorded | Title | Label | Personnel/Notes |
|---|---|---|---|
| 1983 | Wonderful | Sonora | With Barry Harris (piano), Earl Sauls (bass), Leroy Williams (drums) |
| 1984 | 4/4 = 1 | Sonora | With Kenny Barron (piano), Earl Sauls (bass), Victor Jones (drums) |
| 1987 | Echoes | Contemporary | With Pepper Adams (baritone sax), Kenny Barron (piano) Dennis Irwin (bass), Keith Copeland (drums) |
| 1988 | Evening Star | Contemporary | With Jimmy Knepper (trombone), Tommy Flanagan (piano), David Shapiro (bass), Keith Copeland(drums) |
| 1989 | Self-Portrait in Swing | Contemporary | With Kenny Barron (piano), Dennis Irwin (bass), Kenny Washington (drums) |
| 1991 | 9 by 3 | Contemporary | With Dennis Irwin (bass), Kenny Washington (drums) |
| 1991 | Walk Don't Run | King | With Kenny Barron (piano), Dennis Irwin (bass), Kenny Washington (drums) |
| 1992 | I Want to Hold Your Hand (The Compositions of the Beatles Vol. 1) | Paddle Wheel | With Kenny Barron (piano), Dennis Irwin (bass), Kenny Washington (drums) |
| 1992 | Oh! Darling (The Compositions of the Beatles Vol. 2) | Paddle Wheel | With Kenny Barron (piano), Dennis Irwin (bass), Kenny Washington(drums) |
| 1993 | Sittin' on the Thing with Ming | Capri | With Kenny Barron (piano), Ray Drummond (bass), Keith Copeland (drums) |
| 1993 | Remembering Grant Green | Evidence | With Kenny Barron (piano), Jack McDuff (organ), Ray Drummond (bass), Al Harewood and Keith Copeland (drums) |
| 1996 | Let's Call This Monk! | Double-Time | With Dennis Irwin (bass), Mickey Roker (drums) |
| 1999 | This Just In... | Double Time | With Sid Simmons (piano), Dennis Irwin (bass), Kenny Washington(drums) |
| 2000 | The Music of Bud Powell | Double Time | With Earl Sauls (bass), Keith Copeland (drums) |
| 2002 | Tomorrow's Hours | Capri | With Earl Sauls (bass), Keith Copeland (drums) |
| 2003 | A Jamais | Capri | With Louis Petrucciani (bass), Joel Allouche (drums) |
| 2004 | Memoire: The French Sessions Vol. 2 | Capri | With Louis Petrucciani (bass), Christian Salut (drums) |
| 2009 | No One New | Capri | With Lisle Atkinson (bass), Eliot Zigmund (drums) |
| 2013 | With the Wind and the Rain | Capri | With Mike Richmond (cello), Lisle Atkinson (bass), Eliot Zigmund (drums) |
| 2014 | 2nd Avenue: The Return of the Cello Quartet | Capri | With Mike Richmond (cello), Lisle Atkinson (bass), Andy Watson (drums) |
| 2016 | 88 | Capri | With Mike Richmond (cello), Lisle Atkinson (bass), Andy Watson (drums) |

== Sources ==
- Richard Cook and Brian Morton: The Penguin Guide to Jazz Recordings, 8th Edition, London, Penguin, 2006 ISBN 0-141-02327-9
