= Walk Don't Run (Joshua Breakstone album) =

Studio album by Joshua Breakstone Quartet featuring Kenny Barron
- Released: 1992
- Recorded: August 26, 1991
- Studio: Van Gelder Studio, Englewood Cliffs, NJ
- Genre: Jazz
- Length: 60:33
- Label: King; KICJ-79
- Producer: Joshua Breakstone

Joshua Breakstone chronology
9 by 3 (1991)	Walk Don't Run (1992)	I Want to Hold Your Hand (1992)

Walk Don't Run is an album by guitarist Joshua Breakstone, featuring tunes associated with instrumental rock band The Ventures, that was recorded in 1991 and first released on the Japanese King label before being reissued in the United States by Evidence.

== Reception ==
Professional ratings
Review scores
Source	Rating
AllMusic	3/5 stars
The Penguin Guide to Jazz Recordings	3/4 stars

In his review on AllMusic, Ron Wynn states "Guitarist Joshua Breakstone covers 10 tunes originally recorded by the guitar legends, but does not rip through them or make any concession to a more rock or pop approach. Instead, he takes them as he does any composition, playing in a gentle, relaxed pace, investigating the melody, slowly interpreting and revising via his solos. Breakstone's sound and approach are reminiscent of Jim Hall's, although his voicings are not as full, and his comping and tone are his own. Breakstone and company give Ventures fans and jazz audiences something to ponder with their explorations".

== Track listing ==
1. "Lullaby of the Leaves" (Bernice Petkere, Joe Young) – 8:43
2. "Telstar" (Joe Meek) – 4:17
3. "Ram-Bunk-Shush" (Henry Glover, Lucky Millinder, Jimmy Mundy) – 7:19
4. "Perfidia" (Alberto Domínguez, Milton Leeds) – 6:16
5. "Walk, Don't Run" (Johnny Smith) – 5:56
6. "A Taste of Honey" (Bobby Scott, Ric Marlow) – 5:00
7. "Apache" (Jerry Lordan) – 6:25
8. "Caravan" (Duke Ellington, Irving Mills, Juan Tizol) – 8:21
9. "Slaughter on Tenth Avenue" (Richard Rodgers) – 3:44
10. "Blue Star" (Victor Young, Edward Heyman) – 4:32

== Personnel ==
- Joshua Breakstone – guitar
- Kenny Barron – piano
- Dennis Irwin – bass
- Kenny Washington – drums
