= Groove Elation =

Studio album by John Scofield
- Released: October 24, 1995
- Recorded: 1995
- Studio: Power Station and River Sound, New York City
- Genre: Jazz, soul jazz, jazz-funk
- Length: 60:05
- Label: Blue Note
- Producer: Lee Townsend

John Scofield chronology
Liquid Fire: The Best of John Scofield (1994)	Groove Elation (1995)	Quiet (1996)

Groove Elation is an album by the jazz guitarist John Scofield, released in 1995. It features keyboardist Larry Goldings, bassist Dennis Irwin, percussionist Don Alias and drummer Idris Muhammad, as well as a four piece horn section led by trumpeter Randy Brecker.

== Critical reception ==
Professional ratings
Review scores
Source	Rating
AllMusic	4.5/5 stars

The Washington Post wrote that Scofield "balances crisp articulation with cool legato passages, jarring intervals with catchy melodies, acoustic warmth with electric bite and soul." The Globe and Mail determined that "the two pieces on Groove Elation that feature Scofield on acoustic guitar are rather ordinary, but several of the other eight are irresistible, none more than the title track, 'Kool' and 'Big Top'."

== Track listing ==
All tracks are written by John Scofield.

No.	Title	Length
1.	"Lazy"	4:46
2.	"Peculiar"	6:33
3.	"Let the Cat Out"	5:35
4.	"Kool"	4:49
5.	"Old Soul"	5:21
6.	"Groove Elation"	6:50
7.	"Carlos"	7:28
8.	"Soft Shoe"	6:06
9.	"Let It Shine"	6:04
10.	"Bigtop"	6:33

== Personnel ==
- John Scofield – acoustic guitar, electric guitar
- Larry Goldings – acoustic piano, organ
- Dennis Irwin – double bass
- Idris Muhammad – drums
- Don Alias – percussion
- Howard Johnson – baritone saxophone, bass clarinet, tuba
- Billy Drewes – tenor saxophone, flute
- Steve Turre – trombone
- Randy Brecker – trumpet, flugelhorn

=== Production ===
- Susan Scofield – executive producer
- John Scofield – producer
- James Farber – recording, mixing
- Greg Calbi – mastering at Sterling Sound (New York, NY)
- Mark Larson – design
- Satoshi Kobayashi – design
- Patti Perret – color photography
- Jimmy Katz – black and white photography
