= Meant to Be (John Scofield album) =

Studio album by John Scofield Quartet
- Released: 1991
- Recorded: December 1990
- Studio: Power Station, New York City
- Genre: Jazz
- Length: 68:36
- Label: Blue Note
- Producer: Don Grolnick

John Scofield Quartet chronology
Slo Sco:The Best of the Ballads (1990)	Meant to Be (1991)	Grace Under Pressure (1992)

Professional ratings
Review scores
Source	Rating
AllMusic	4.5/5 stars
The Encyclopedia of Popular Music	5/5 stars
The Penguin Guide to Jazz Recordings	3.5/4 stars

Meant to Be is a studio album by jazz guitarist John Scofield. It was the second of his albums to feature saxophonist Joe Lovano, and the first to be released as “The John Scofield Quartet” and to feature drummer Bill Stewart- who would go on to record and tour with Scofield for many years. The bassist is Marc Johnson, with whom Scofield had toured and recorded in Johnson's Bass Desires group.

== Track listing ==
All tunes composed by John Scofield.

1. "Big Fan" - 6:03
2. "Keep Me in Mind" - 6:00
3. "Go Blow" - 8:19
4. "Chariots" - 6:02
5. "The Guinness Spot" - 6:35
6. "Mr. Coleman to You" - 6:02
7. "Eisenhower" - 5:20
8. "Meant to Be" - 7:07
9. "Some Nerve" - 5:10
10. "Lost in Space" - 6:30
11. "French Flics" - 5:28

== Personnel ==
- John Scofield – guitars
- Joe Lovano – tenor saxophone, alto clarinet
- Marc Johnson – double bass
- Bill Stewart – drums

=== Production ===
- Don Grolnick – producer
- James Farber – recording, mixing
- Matthew LaMonica – assistant engineer
- Gary Solomon – assistant engineer
- Bob Ludwig – mastering at Masterdisk (New York, NY)
- Matt Pierson – project coordinator
- Cynthia Cochrane – production coordinator
- Patti Perret – photography
- Janet Parr – design
