= Liquid Fire: The Best of John Scofield =

Greatest hits album by John Scofield
- Released: October 18, 1994 (US) (CD)
- Recorded: 1984–1988
- Studio: A & R, New York City
- Genre: Jazz
- Length: 60:13 (CD)
- Label: Gramavision Records
- Producer: John Scofield (tracks 1–2), Steve Swallow (tracks 3–6, 9–12), Glen Harada (tracks 7–8)

John Scofield chronology
Hand Jive (1994)	Liquid Fire: The Best of John Scofield (1994)	Groove Elation (1995)

Professional ratings
Review scores
Source	Rating
Allmusic	4/5 stars

Liquid Fire: The Best of John Scofield is a compilation album by jazz musician John Scofield. The tracks found on this album are a mixture of exact versions found on previously released Scofield recordings, and two tracks taken from live performances during his tenure on Gramavision Records from 1984 until 1988.

== Musicians ==
This John Scofield album consists of John Scofield (guitar, bass), David Sanborn (alto saxophone), Ray Anderson (trombone), Don Grolnick (Hammond B-3 organ, keyboards), Mitchel Forman, Robert Aries, George Duke (keyboards), Peter Levin (synthesizer), Darryl Jones, Gary Grainger, Anthony Cox (bass), Steve Jordan, Dennis Chambers, Johnny Vidacovich, Terri Lynne Carrington (drums), Omar Hakim (drums, percussion), Don Alias (percussion).

The audio engineers were: Joe Ferla (tracks 1–2, 5–6, 9–12); Alec Head (tracks 3–4); Katuyuki Igarashi, Tsuro Ogawa (tracks 7–8). Includes liner notes by Louisa Hufstader and David Greenberg. All songs written by John Scofield except "Georgia On My Mind" (Stuart Gorrell/Hoagy Carmichael).

== Track listing ==
1. "Just My Luck
2. "King For A Day"
3. "High And Mighty"
4. "Protocol"
5. "Make Me"
6. "The Nag"
7. "Georgia On My Mind" - (live)
8. "Blue Matter" - (live)
9. "Wabash"
10. "Loud Jazz"
11. "Science And Religion"
12. "The Boss's Car"
