= Why Not (George Cables album) =

Studio album by George Cables
- Released: 1975
- Recorded: October 7, 1975
- Studio: Record Plant, Los Angeles, CA
- Genre: Jazz
- Length: 57:57
- Label: Why Not Records
- Producer: Masahiko Yuh

George Cables chronology
Why Not (1975)	Cables' Vision (1980)

Why Not is the debut album by jazz pianist George Cables, released in 1975 on Why Not Records.

== Track listing ==
All compositions by George Cables.

1. "Ebony Moonbeams" - 10:32
2. "Rita I and II" - 11:51
3. "Dark Side-Light Side" - 8:58
4. "Quiet Fire" - 9:47
5. "Why Not?" - 7:29
6. "Think of Me" - 9:20

== Personnel ==
- George Cables - piano
- Tony Dumas - bass
- Carl Burnett - drums
