= Hand Jive (album) =

Studio album by John Scofield
- Released: August 9, 1994 (US) (CD)
- Recorded: October 1993
- Studio: Power Station and River Sound, New York City
- Genre: Jazz, soul jazz, jazz-funk
- Length: 63:22 (CD)
- Label: Blue Note
- Producer: Lee Townsend

John Scofield chronology
I Can See Your House from Here (with Pat Metheny) (1994)	Hand Jive (1994)	Liquid Fire: The Best of John Scofield (1994)

Hand Jive is a studio album by the jazz guitarist John Scofield, released in 1994. It features veteran tenor saxophonist Eddie Harris, keyboardist Larry Goldings, bassist Dennis Irwin, percussionist Don Alias, and drummer Bill Stewart.

== Critical reception ==
Professional ratings
Review scores
Source	Rating
AllMusic	4.5/5 stars
Entertainment Weekly	A−
Los Angeles Times	3/4 stars
The Penguin Guide to Jazz Recordings	3/4 stars

Entertainment Weekly wrote: "Scofield veers more towards the New Orleans-y BBQ sauce here, working up a delectable new flavor of jazz-soul, in which rough-housing inventiveness is the order of the day." The Los Angeles Times noted that "Scofield has a flexible unit that can be muscular one moment, blues-soaked the next, and gutsy yet highbrow the next."

== Track listing ==
All compositions written by John Scofield.

1. "I'll Take Les" – 6:58
2. "Dark Blue" – 7:37
3. "Do Like Eddie" – 8:06
4. "She's So Lucky" – 5:50
5. "Checkered Past" – 5:28
6. "7th Floor" – 4:45
7. "Golden Daze" – 7:33
8. "Don't Shoot the Messenger" – 6:10
9. "Whip the Mule" – 5:37
10. "Out of the City" – 5:18

== Personnel ==
- John Scofield – guitars
- Eddie Harris – tenor saxophone
- Larry Goldings – acoustic piano, organ
- Dennis Irwin – bass
- Bill Stewart – drums
- Don Alias – percussion

=== Production ===
- Susan Scofield – executive producer
- Lee Townsend – producer
- James Farber – recording, mixing
- Chris Albert – recording assistant
- Tony Gillis – mix assistant
- Greg Calbi – mastering at Sterling Sound (New York, NY)
- Mark Larson – design
- Patti Perret – photography
