= Double-Time Records =

American jazz record label (founded 1995)

- Founded: 1995
- Founder: Jamey D. Aebersold
- Status: Defunct
- Genre: Jazz
- Country of origin: U.S.
- Location: New Albany, Indiana

Double-Time Records (a.k.a. Double-Time Jazz) is a jazz record company and label founded by Jamey D. Aebersold's son in New Albany, Indiana from 1995-2005. Its catalogue includes albums by John Abercrombie, Bruce Barth, Jerry Bergonzi, Conrad Herwig, Andy LaVerne, Dave Liebman, Hank Marr, Steve Slagle, and Walt Weiskopf.

== Discography ==
=== Albums ===
Catalog	Artist	Albums
101	Shew, Bobby	Tribute to the Masters
102	Marr, Hank	It's 'bout Time!
103	Dean, Kevin	Kevin's Heaven
104	Coolman, Todd	Lexicon
105	Galper, Hal	Live at Port Townsend
106	Weiskopf, Walt	Night Lights
107	Slagle, Steve	Our Sound!
108	Herwig, Conrad	New York Breed
109	Liebman, David	Return of the Tenor – Standards
110	Laverne, Andy & Abercrombie, John	Where Were We
111	Skaff, Greg	Blues and Other News
112	Marr, Hank	Groovin' It!
113	Rosolino, Frank	Fond Memories of...
114	Braden, Don	Open Road, The
115	Campbell, Gary	Thick and Thin
116	Fusco, Andy	Big Man's Blues
117	Reid, Rufus & Michael Moore	Double Bass Delights
118	Juris, Vic	Music of Alec Wilder
119	Flory, Chris	Word on the Street
120	LaVerne, Andy & Evans, Bill	Modern Days and Nights: Music of Cole Porter
121	Breakstone, Joshua	Let's Call This Monk!
122	Schonecker, Joachim	Common Language
123	Davis, Steve	Explorations and Impressions
124	Watrous, Bill	Space Available
125	Galper, Hal	Children of the Night
126	Cohn, Joe	Two Funky People
127	Bergonzi, Jerry	Just Within
128	Wendholt, Scott	Beyond Thursday
129	Barth, Bruce	Don't Blame Me
130	Snidero, Jim	Standards + Plus
131	Armacost, Tim	Live at Smalls
132	Gertz, Bruce & Ken Cervenka	Shut Wide Open
133	Pickens, Harry	Live at Stem Concert Hall
134	Marr, Hank	Hank & Frank
135	LeDonne, Mike	To Each His Own
136	Gordon, Jon	Currents
137	Ries, Barry	Solitude in the Crowd
138	Roccisano, Joe	Nonet
139	Werner, Kenny	Unprotected Music
140	Norrbotten Big Band	Future North
141	Cutting Edge, The	Cutting Edge, The
142	Bergonzi, Jerry	Lost in the Shuffle
143	Barth, Bruce	Hope Springs Eternal
144	Michelin, Nando	Art
145	Israel, Yoron	Chicago
146	Pickens, Harry	Passionate Ballads
147	Keller, Gary	Blues for an Old New Age
148	Smith, Steve	Chantal's Way
149	Breakstone, Joshua	This Just In...
150	Cohen, Tom	Diggin' In/Diggin' Out
151	Santoro, Dave	Standards Band
152	Snidero, Jim	Music of Joe Henderson, The
153	LeDonne, Mike	Then & Now
154	Liebman, David	Monk's Mood
155	Gertz, Bruce	Red Handed
156	Gordon, Jon	Things We Need, The
157	Galper, Hal	Let's Call This That
158	Reid, Rufus & Michael Moore	Intimacy of the Bass, The
159	Muldrow, Ronald	Freedom's Serenade
160	D'Angelo, Dave	In a Minute
161	Hilgenberg, Matt	Rasa
162	Azzolina, Jay	Past Tense
163	Armacost, Tim	Wishing Well, The
164	Wendholt, Scott	What Goes Unsaid
165	Santoro, Dave	Standards Band II
166	Caswell, Sara	First Song
167	Sneider, John	Panorama
168	Barth, Bruce	Somehow It's True
169	Michelin, Nando	Chants – A Candomble Experience
170	Uotila, Jukkis	Hunters and Gatherers
171	Gordon, Jon	Possibilities
172	Breakstone, Joshua	Music of Bud Powell, The
173	Bergonzi, Jerry	Wiggy
174	Lossing, Russ	Dreamer
175	Wall, Dan	On the Inside Looking In
176	D'Earth, John	Restoration Comedy
177	Braden, Don	Presents the Contemporary Standards Ensemble
178	Wuepper, Craig	Returnsman, The
179	Bergeron, Chuck	Cause and Effect
180	Hazilla, Jon	Tiny Capers
181	Sussman, Richard	Free Fall
182	LeDonne, Mike	Bags' Groove – A Tribute to Milt Jackson
183	Santoro, Dave	New Standard, The
184	Bergonzi, Jerry	Different Look, A
185	Gordon, Jon & Bill Charlap	Contrasts
186	Werner, Kenny	Form and Fantasy
187	Liebman, David & Walter, J. D.	Clear Day
188	Michelin, Nando	Brazilian Project
189	Blenzig, Charles	It's About Time
190	Bergonzi, Jerry	Live Gonz!
191	Simerly, Rick	Obscurity
192	Michelin, Nando	Einstein's Dreams

== See also ==
- List of record labels
