= George Cables at Maybeck =

Live album by George Cables
- Released: 1994
- Recorded: April 1994
- Venue: Maybeck Recital Hall, Berkeley, California
- Genre: Jazz
- Label: Concord

George Cables at Maybeck: Maybeck Recital Hall Series, Volume 35 is an album of solo performances by jazz pianist George Cables.

== Music and recording ==
The album was recorded at the Maybeck Recital Hall in Berkeley, California, in April 1994. The material includes standards and Cables originals.

== Release and reception ==
Professional ratings
Review scores
Source	Rating
AllMusic	3/5 stars
The Penguin Guide to Jazz	3.5/4 stars
The Virgin Encyclopedia of Jazz	3/5 stars

The AllMusic reviewer wrote that Cables found little new to say on the familiar material, and was more interesting on the other pieces. The 1996 edition of The Penguin Guide to Jazz suggested that this album would be a good starting point for any listeners who doubted Cables' worth.

== Track listing ==
1. "Over the Rainbow"
2. "Helen's Song"
3. "Bess, You Is My Woman Now"
4. "My Man's Gone Now"
5. "Someone to Watch over Me"
6. "You Don't Know What Love Is"
7. "Lullaby"
8. "Everything Happens to Me"
9. "Goin' Home"
10. "Little B's Poem"

== Personnel ==
- George Cables – piano
