= Scorched (Mark-Anthony Turnage & John Scofield album) =

Live album by Mark-Anthony Turnage & John Scofield
- Released: 13 January 2004
- Recorded: 7 September 2002
- Venue: Alte Oper (Frankfurt, Germany)
- Genre: Jazz, third stream, classical crossover
- Length: 63:53 (CD)
- Label: DG Deutsche Grammophon
- Producer: Udo Wüstendörfer

Mark-Anthony Turnage chronology
The Silver Tassie (2002)	Scorched (2004)	Etudes & Elegies / Canzona Per Sonare / Cuts And Dissolves / Olicantus (2004)

John Scofield chronology
Up All Night (2003)	Scorched (2004)	EnRoute: John Scofield Trio LIVE (2004)

Scorched is the live recorded premiere of the (re-)composition by Mark-Anthony Turnage commissioned by the Society of Friends and Patrons of the Frankfurt Radio Symphony in 2002. Turnage recomposed and orchestrated original compositions by jazz guitarist John Scofield for symphony orchestra and big band to which the title refers (SCOfield ORCHstratED). Scofield was part of the project together with John Patitucci on electric bass and Peter Erskine on drums. In 2004, it was nominated for a Grammy for "Best Classical Crossover Album".

The work on Scorched is used in the film portrait of Turnage by Barrie Gavin (Getting Scorched: Mark-Anthony Turnage, DVD, 2009)

== Reception ==
Professional ratings
Review scores
Source	Rating
AllMusic	4/5 stars
The Guardian	3/5 stars

In a review for AllMusic, Rick Anderson wrote that Turnage's "orchestral elaborations on Scofield's original themes are surprisingly insightful and exciting... Turnage avoids the standard classical-jazz crossover error of trying to make an ensemble this large actually swing; instead, he creates interest with dense but agile harmonic movement and crisp rhythmic change-ups... Very highly recommended."

The Guardian's John L Walters stated: "Given the enormous amount of musical thought needed to face up to an improviser of Scofield's calibre, Turnage has done a terrific job."

Harvey Siders of Jazz Times commented: "Scorched... proves that the ultimate in fusion has been undertaken-not necessarily achieved, but certainly attempted... The fusion is not always successful. Sure, when Turnage provides Scofield with a lush background the result is beautiful, but that's no big deal."

In an article for Gramophone, David Gutman remarked: "the synthesis of classical and jazz elements is more convincing than in most so-called 'fusion', with a real sense of two musicians striking sparks off one another... this is a successful example of an oft-derided genre."

Writing for The Morning Call, Tim Blangger stated: "while Sco may have bucketloads of good work behind him, this may be one of his strongest recordings... Turnage's contribution here can't be understated, either... This is a refreshing mix, especially for both jazz and classical folks who may feel they've heard it all before."

In a review of a live performance of Scorched, Lawrence A. Johnson of Chicago Classical Review wrote that it "is a ground-breaking triumph... an artful fusion of genres that preserves the blistering dynamism and improvisational essence of jazz while deftly and imaginatively drawing on the resources of a large symphony orchestra."

== Track listing ==
All titles composed by Mark-Anthony Turnage and John Scofield.

1. "Make Me 1" – 2:56
2. "Make Me 2" – 3:02
3. "Kubrick" – 4:27
4. "Away With Words" – 6:34
5. "Fat Lip 1" – 3:07
6. "Fat Lip 2" – 4:37
7. "Deadzy" – 5:21
8. "Trim" – 3:31
9. "Nocturnal Mission" – 3:50
10. "Let's Say We Did" – 6:27
11. "The Nag" – 5:31
12. "Cadenza" – 3:12
13. "Gil B643" – 7:23
14. "Protocol" – 3:48

== Personnel ==
- Mark-Anthony Turnage – orchestration, arrangements
- Hugh Wolff – conductor
- Carsten Dufner – music director
- hr-Bigband – ensemble
- Frankfurt Radio Symphony – orchestra
- John Scofield – guitars
- John Patitucci – electric bass
- Peter Erskine – drums

== Production ==
- Sid McLauchlan – executive producer
- Udo Wüstendörfer – producer, mixing
- Hessicher Rundfunk – co-producer
- Wolfgang Decker – engineer
- Charly Morell – engineer, mixing
- John Scofield – mixing, editing
- Mark-Anthony Turnage – mixing, editing
- Emil Berliner Studios (Berlin, Germany) – mastering
- Hartmut Pfeiffer – art direction
- Richard Misrach – cover photography
- Peter Erskine – photography
- Jimmy Katz – photography
- Carsten Dufner – liner notes
- Nick Kimberley – liner notes
- Dennis Collins – French translation
- Reinhard Lüthje – German translation
