= Out Like a Light =

Live album by John Scofield
- Released: 1983
- Recorded: December 14, 1981
- Venue: Club Vielharmonie (Munich, Germany)
- Genre: Jazz
- Length: 35:53
- Label: Enja
- Producer: Horst Weber, Matthias Winckelmann

John Scofield chronology
Shinola (1982)	Out Like a Light (1983)	Electric Outlet (1984)

Professional ratings
Review scores
Source	Rating
Allmusic	4/5 stars
The Rolling Stone Jazz Record Guide	3/5 stars
The Penguin Guide to Jazz Recordings	3.5/4 stars

Out Like a Light is a live album by jazz guitarist John Scofield, recorded in 1981 and released in 1983 on Enja Records. It is the last of three albums to feature his trio with bass guitarist Steve Swallow and drummer Adam Nussbaum.

The album is the follow-up to his previous Shinola as both recordings contain material from the same Munich concert venue. Out Like a Light contains the third evening of December 1981 the trio played there. Except for the last track, a standard by Alan Jay Lerner the repertoire consists of four original compositions by Scofield that all run over 7 minutes. It was the third and last album of this trio and the last for the Enja label. During his following tenure with Miles Davis Sco would sign with Gramavision.

Scofield and Swallow continued to work together. Swallow would serve as producer on a number of Scofield albums on which he does not play, and eventually as bassist once again with a touring trio (EnRoute: John Scofield Trio LIVE, 2004) on This Meets That in 2006, and Country for Old Men in 2016. Sco and Swallow also recorded together with Paul Bley (Hot, 1986), on Swallow's own album Swallow (1992), and with Kip Hanrahan, Gary Burton, Motohiko Hino and Mike Gibbs.

== Track listing ==
1. "Holidays" (John Scofield) - 8:45
2. "Last Week" (Scofield) - 8:41
3. "Miss Directions" (Scofield) - 7:53
4. "Out Like a Light" (Scofield) - 7:01
5. "Melinda" (Al Lerner) - 3:18

== Personnel ==
- John Scofield – electric guitar
- Steve Swallow – bass guitar
- Adam Nussbaum – drums
