= Ivory Forest =

Studio album by Hal Galper
- Released: 1980
- Recorded: October 31–November 1, 1979
- Genre: Jazz
- Length: 40:06
- Label: Enja
- Producer: Matthias Winckelmann

Professional ratings
Review scores
Source	Rating
Allmusic	3/5 stars

Ivory Forest is a recording by a quartet led by pianist Hal Galper. It was released on the Enja Label in 1980. It features a 28-year-old John Scofield, whose 1979 Enja album Rough House featured Galper and drummer Adam Nussbaum in a similar quartet context. Nussbaum and Scofield also formed part of the Dave Liebman Quintet at this time, and played together in Scofield's trio from 1980 to 1983.

The album opens with two solo instrumental performances of pieces from the jazz standard repertoire. First, Scofield plays a solo guitar arrangement of Thelonious Monk's "Monk's Mood", and then Galper plays a solo arrangement of the Latin American popular song Yellow Days. The rest of the album features quartet performances of compositions written by Galper.

== Track listing ==
1. "Monk's Mood" (Thelonious Monk) – 5:58 (solo guitar)
2. "Yellows Days" (Alan Bernstein/Álvaro Carrillo) – 3:48 (solo piano)
3. "Rapunzel's Luncheonette" (Hal Galper) – 9:36
4. "Ivory Forest" (Hal Galper) – 7:36
5. "Continuity" (Hal Galper) – 6:32
6. "My Dog Spot" (Hal Galper) – 6:31

== Personnel ==
- Hal Galper - Piano
- John Scofield - Guitar
- Wayne Dockery - Bass
- Adam Nussbaum - drums
