= Überjam Deux =

Studio album by John Scofield
- Released: July 2013
- Recorded: January 2013
- Studio: Sear Sound, New York City
- Genre: Jazz
- Length: 61:54
- Label: EmArcy
- Producer: John Scofield; Avi Bortnick

John Scofield chronology
A Moment's Peace (2011)	Überjam Deux (2013)	Juice (2014)

Professional ratings
Review scores
Source	Rating
Allmusic	4/5 stars
All About Jazz	(favorable)

Überjam Deux is a studio album by American jazz guitarist John Scofield. The record features guitarist and co-producer Avi Bortnick, bass guitarist Andy Hess, drummers Adam Deitch and Louis Cato, and John Medeski on organ, electric piano & mellotron. The album is a follow-up to the “John Scofield Band” albums Überjam (2002) and Up All Night (2003).

== Track listing ==
All songs written by John Scofield, except tracks 1–3, 5–7 & 9 which were co-written by Avi Bortnick. "Just Don't Want to Be Lonely" (11) was written by Bobby Eli, John C. Freeman and Vinnie Barrett.

No.	Title	Length
1.	"Camelus"	5:17
2.	"Boogie Stupid"	5:05
3.	"Endless Summer"	6:07
4.	"Dub Dub"	6:06
5.	"Cracked Ice"	5:53
6.	"Al Green Song"	5:50
7.	"Snake Dance"	7:13
8.	"Scotown"	4:35
9.	"Torero"	5:51
10.	"Curtis Knew"	4:44
11.	"Just Don't Want to Be Lonely"	5:07
Total length:		61:54

Japanese edition bonus track
No.	Title	Length
12.	"C.P. Shuffle"	3:09

== Personnel ==
- John Scofield – guitars
- John Medeski – Wurlitzer electric piano (2, 4, 6, 10, 11), organ (2, 4, 6, 10, 11), Mellotron (2, 4, 6, 10, 11)
- Avi Bortnick – guitars, sampling
- Andy Hess – bass guitar
- Adam Deitch – drums (1, 2, 4, 5, 7, 10, 11)
- Louis Cato – drums (3, 6, 8, 9)

=== Production ===
- Susan Scofield – executive producer, cover concept
- John Scofield – producer
- Avi Bortnick – co-producer
- James Farber – recording, mixing
- Kevin Harper – assistant engineer
- Ted Tuthill – assistant engineer
- Brian Montgomery – digital editing
- Greg Calbi – mastering at Sterling Sound (New York, NY)
- Mark Hess – cover concept, design
- Nick Suttle – back cover photograph, musician photography
- Sierra Dehlmer – cover photography
- Elizabeth Penta – John Medeski photography
- Jean Scofield – rug photography
