= Rough House =

Rough House or roughhouse may refer to:

- Rough House (album), an album released in 1978 by jazz musician John Scofield
- Roughhouse, a comic book supervillain in the Marvel Comics universe
- Rough House (DC Comics), a fictional gang member in DC Comics
- Rough House, the grumpy chef in the comic strip Popeye
- Rough House, an anglicization of Rauhes Haus, a home for orphans in Hamburg, Germany
- The Rough House, a 1917 film starring Fatty Arbuckle and Buster Keaton
