= John Scofield Live =

Live album by John Scofield
- Released: 1978
- Recorded: November 4, 1977
- Venue: Domicile (Munich, Germany)
- Genre: Jazz fusion
- Length: 73:16
- Label: Enja
- Producer: Horst Weber, Matthias Winckelmann

John Scofield chronology
East Meets West (1978)	John Scofield Live (1978)	Rough House (1978)

Professional ratings
Review scores
Source	Rating
Allmusic	4/5 stars

John Scofield Live is a live album by jazz guitarist John Scofield, featuring pianist Richie Beirach, bassist George Mraz and drummer Joe LaBarbera. It was recorded on November 4, 1977, in Munchen, Germany.

== Track listing ==
All tracks are written by John Scofield except where noted.

No.	Title	Writer(s)	Length
1.	"V."		10:33
2.	"Gray and Visceral"		14:54
3.	"Leaving"	Scofield, Richie Beirach	14:35
4.	"Air Pakistan"		9:41
5.	"Jeannie"		8:22
6.	"Softly, as in a Morning Sunrise"	Oscar Hammerstein II, Sigmund Romberg	15:11

== Personnel ==
- John Scofield – electric guitar
- Richie Beirach – piano
- George Mraz – double bass
- Joe LaBarbera – drums
