= Best of John Scofield =

The Best of John Scofield

Greatest hits album by John Scofield
- Released: 12 November 1996 (US) (CD)
- Recorded: November 1989 – June 1995
- Studio: Power Station, New York City
- Genre: Post-bop
- Length: 56:49 (CD)
- Label: Blue Note Records
- Producer: Bob Belden, Peter Erskine, Don Grolnick, John Scofield, Steve Swallow & Michael Cuscuna

Professional ratings
Review scores
Source	Rating
Allmusic	4/5 stars

The Best of John Scofield is a compilation album by jazz musician John Scofield. All tracks except "Tom Thumb" (previously unreleased) can be found on Scofield recordings during his tenure on Blue Note Records from November 1989 until June 1995.

== Musicians ==
This John Scofield album consists of John Scofield, Pat Metheny, Bill Frisell (guitar); Joe Lovano, Eddie Harris (tenor saxophone); Howard Johnson (tuba); Randy Brecker (trumpet); Charlie Haden, Dennis Irwin, Marc Johnson (bass); Don Alias (percussion); Joey Baron, Jack DeJohnette, Idris Muhammad, Bill Stewart (drums).

== Track listing ==
1. "So Sue Me"
2. "Flower Power"
3. "Big Fan"
4. "Camp Out"
5. "Call 911"
6. "You Bet"
7. "Message To My Friend"
8. "Tom Thumb" - (previously unreleased)
9. "Do Like Eddie"
10. "Kool"
