= Steady Groovin' =

Steady Groovin': The Blue Note Groove Sides

Greatest hits album by John Scofield
- Released: September 26, 2000 (US) (CD)
- Recorded: November 1989 – June 1995
- Studio: Power Station, New York City
- Genre: Jazz
- Length: (CD)
- Label: Blue Note Records
- Producer: John Scofield, Peter Erskine, Steve Swallow, Lee Townsend, Don Grolnick & Eli Wolf

John Scofield chronology
Bump (2000)	Steady Groovin': The Blue Note Groove Sides (2000)	Works for Me (2001)

Professional ratings
Review scores
Source	Rating
Allmusic	4/5 stars

Steady Groovin': The Blue Note Groove Sides is a compilation album by jazz musician John Scofield. The album consists of recordings Scofield made as a Blue Note artist, and were recorded from November 1989 until June 1995.

== Musicians ==
This John Scofield album consists of John Scofield (guitar); Eddie Harris, Billy Drewes, Joe Lovano (tenor saxophone); Howard Johnson (baritone saxophone, tuba, bass clarinet); Randy Brecker (trumpet, flugelhorn); John Clark (French horn); Jim Pugh, Steve Turre (trombone); Larry Goldings (Organ); Bill Frisell (guitar); Dennis Irwin, Charlie Haden, Marc Johnson (bass); Bill Stewart, Idris Muhammad, Jack DeJohnette, Joey Baron (drums); Don Alias (percussion).

The tracks on this album were digitally remastered by Odea Murphy (Capitol Studios, Los Angeles, California).

== Track listing ==
No.	Title	Length
1.	"Kool"	4:50
2.	"Do Like Eddie"	8:09
3.	"Chariots"	6:03
4.	"Lazy"	4:46
5.	"Camp Out"	8:02
6.	"7th Floor"	4:50
7.	"Carlos"	7:29
8.	"Big Top"	6:33
9.	"She's So Lucky"	5:56
10.	"Twang"	6:11
11.	"Fat Lip"	3:47
Total length:		66:36
