= Combo 66 =

Studio album by John Scofield
- Released: September 28, 2018
- Recorded: April 9–10, 2018
- Studio: Carriage House Studio (Stamford, Connecticut)
- Genre: Jazz
- Length: 69:22
- Label: Verve
- Producer: John Scofield

John Scofield chronology
Hudson (2017)	Combo 66 (2018)	Swallow Tales (2020)

Professional ratings
Review scores
Source	Rating
All About Jazz	4/5 stars
AllMusic	3.5/5 stars
Mojo	3/5 stars
PopMatters	7/10
The Times	4/5 stars
Tom Hull	B+

Combo 66 a studio album by American jazz musician John Scofield. The album was released on 28 September 2018 by Verve label. The “66” in the album title refers to Scofield's age at the time of recording. The combo themselves include keyboardist Gerald Clayton, bassist Vicente Archer and longtime Scofield drummer Bill Stewart.

== Reception ==
Jeff Tamarkin writing for Relix stated, "Scofield prefers clean lines, a marked swing (even notably present in the ballads) to push his melodies ahead and an uncluttered accompaniment that allows his leads to stand out without entirely dominating the proceedings. It’s a formula that has made Scofield one of the most popular artists in contemporary jazz." Bill Meredith in his review for JazzTimes noted, "Combo 66 may be named for Scofield’s age, but it sounds as timeless as he does ageless." Will Layman of PopMatters stated, "John Scofield makes this kind of album-length delight seem tossed-off, casual, easy-as-pie. He wrote each appealing theme, and his worn-in guitar tone dominates every track like the voice of a favorite actor—his guitar sound is arguably the Morgan Freeman of jazz- wise and great to hear, never tiring but never dull." Chris Pearson of The Times added, "Don’t expect a nostalgic wallow, though. Sco’s electric guitar is as fuzzy as ever and all the tunes are originals. This is modern music."

== Track listing ==
All tracks are written by John Scofield.

No.	Title	Length
1.	"Can't Dance"	7:32
2.	"Combo Theme"	7:22
3.	"Icons at the Fair"	5:33
4.	"Willa Jean"	7:59
5.	"Uncle Southern"	5:39
6.	"Dang Swing"	6:09
7.	"New Waltzo"	8:52
8.	"I'm Sleeping In"	5:04
9.	"King of Belgium"	6:24
Total length:		69:22

== Personnel ==
- John Scofield – guitars
- Gerald Clayton – acoustic piano, organ
- Vicente Archer – bass
- Bill Stewart – drums

Production

- John Scofield – producer
- Jay Newland – recording, mixing
- Brian Montgomery – digital editing
- Mark Wilder – mastering at Battery Studios (New York, NY)
- Nick Suttle – photography
