= Bass Desires =

Studio album by Marc Johnson
- Released: 1986
- Recorded: May 1985
- Studio: Power Station, New York City
- Genre: Jazz
- Length: 53:36
- Label: ECM; ECM 1299
- Producer: Manfred Eicher

Marc Johnson chronology
Bass Desires (1986)	Second Sight (1987)

Bass Desires is the debut album by jazz acoustic bassist Marc Johnson, recorded in May 1985 and released on ECM the following year. The quartet—featuring guitarists Bill Frisell and John Scofield, and former Weather Report drummer Peter Erskine—would record Johnson's 1987 follow-up as “Marc Johnson's Bass Desires”.

== Reception ==
The AllMusic review by Michael G. Nastos states, "The pairing of electric guitarists Bill Frisell and John Scofield had to be one of the most auspicious since John McLaughlin and Carlos Santana. Acoustic bassist Marc Johnson's stroke of genius in bringing the two together on Bass Desires resulted in a sound that demonstrated both compatibility between the guitarists and the distinctiveness of the two when heard in combination... this debut has stood the test of time—it is priceless, timeless, and still far from being dated."

Professional ratings
Review scores
Source	Rating
AllMusic	4.5/5 stars
Penguin Guide to Jazz on CD	3/4 stars

== Track listing ==
No.	Title	Writer(s)	Length
1.	"Samurai Hee-Haw"	Johnson	7:44
2.	"Resolution"	John Coltrane	10:31
3.	"Black Is the Color of My True Love's Hair"	Traditional	7:09
4.	"Bass Desires"	Erskine	6:12
5.	"A Wishing Doll"	Elmer Bernstein; Mack David	6:16
6.	"Mojo Highway"	Johnson	8:44
7.	"Thanks Again"	Scofield	7:15

== Personnel ==
- Marc Johnson – bass
- Bill Frisell – guitar, guitar synthesizer
- John Scofield – guitar
- Peter Erskine – drums
