= Right Brain Patrol =

Studio album by Marc Johnson
- Released: 1992
- Recorded: September–November 1991
- Studio: Skyline Studios, NYC
- Genre: Post-bop
- Length: 47:27
- Label: JMT Productions 849 153-2
- Producer: Lee Townsend

Marc Johnson chronology
Two By Four (1989)	Right Brain Patrol (1992)	Magic Labyrinth (1994)

Right Brain Patrol, put out on JMT label, is a studio album by jazz acoustic bassist Marc Johnson and the first with his trio featuring guitarist Ben Monder and percussionist and singer Arto Tuncboyaciyan. Jazz Music Today released the album in 1992.

== Reception ==
The Allmusic review by Sean Westergaard awarded the album 2½ stars, stating "Right Brain Patrol features Marc Johnson in a trio setting with guitarist Ben Monder (among his first recordings) and percussionist Arto Tunçboyaciyan. Johnson is a fabulous bass player with a rich tone. Monder's playing contains shades of Bill Frisell's tone and harmonic sensibility. Tunçboyaciyan is a fine percussionist, but listeners will either love or hate the vocalizing he does on a handful of cuts. "Batuki Burundi" is a solo bass vehicle, and Johnson and Tunçboyaciyan basically divide the rest of the composing duties, with Monder contributing one piece and sharing credits on two more. The bass and guitar playing are stellar throughout, even if Monder sounds a bit derivative in this early session ("Netcong on My Mind" and "Whispers" wouldn't sound out of place on a Bill Frisell album). The title cut has Monder and Johnson trading off leads and support in a lively conversation. "Heru Nazel" has some nice arco bass work and great guitar, but also has some of the aforementioned vocals. "After You" has Johnson playing some great lead over a queasy guitar figure. Few of these tunes will really stick in your head, but they are well played and quite beautiful at times."

Professional ratings
Review scores
Source	Rating
Allmusic	2.5/5 stars
The Penguin Guide to Jazz Recordings	3/4 stars
The Virgin Encyclopedia of Jazz	2/5 stars

== Track listing ==
No.	Title	Writer(s)	Length
1.	"They Love My Fifteen Feet Away"	Tuncboyaciyan	4:54
2.	"Batuki Burundi"	Johnson	3:49
3.	"Netcong on My Mind"	Monder	4:16
4.	"Right Brain Patrol"	Johnson	5:30
5.	"Heru Nazel"	Tuncboyaciyan	5:03
6.	"Inside Four Walls"	Johnson	3:46
7.	"You"	Tuncboyaciyan	0:58
8.	"After You"	Johnson	4:38
9.	"Whispers"	Johnson, Monder	4:29
10.	"Log O'Rhythm"	Johnson	3:26
11.	"Light in Your Eye"	Tuncboyaciyan	2:23
12.	"The Call"	Johnson, Monder	4:18
Total length:			47:27

== Personnel ==
Band

- Marc Johnson – upright bass
- Ben Monder – electric & acoustic guitars
- Arto Tunçboyaciyan – percussions & vocals

Production

- Steve Byram – cover painting, design
- Colin George – artwork, cover art
- Günter Mattei – cover design
- Cheung Ching Ming – photography
- Adrian von Ripka – mastering
- David Schiffman – assistant engineer
- Justin Luchter – assistant engineer, engineer
- James Farber – engineer
- Stefan F. Winter – executive producer
- Lee Townsend – producer
