= Andy Hess =

American bassist

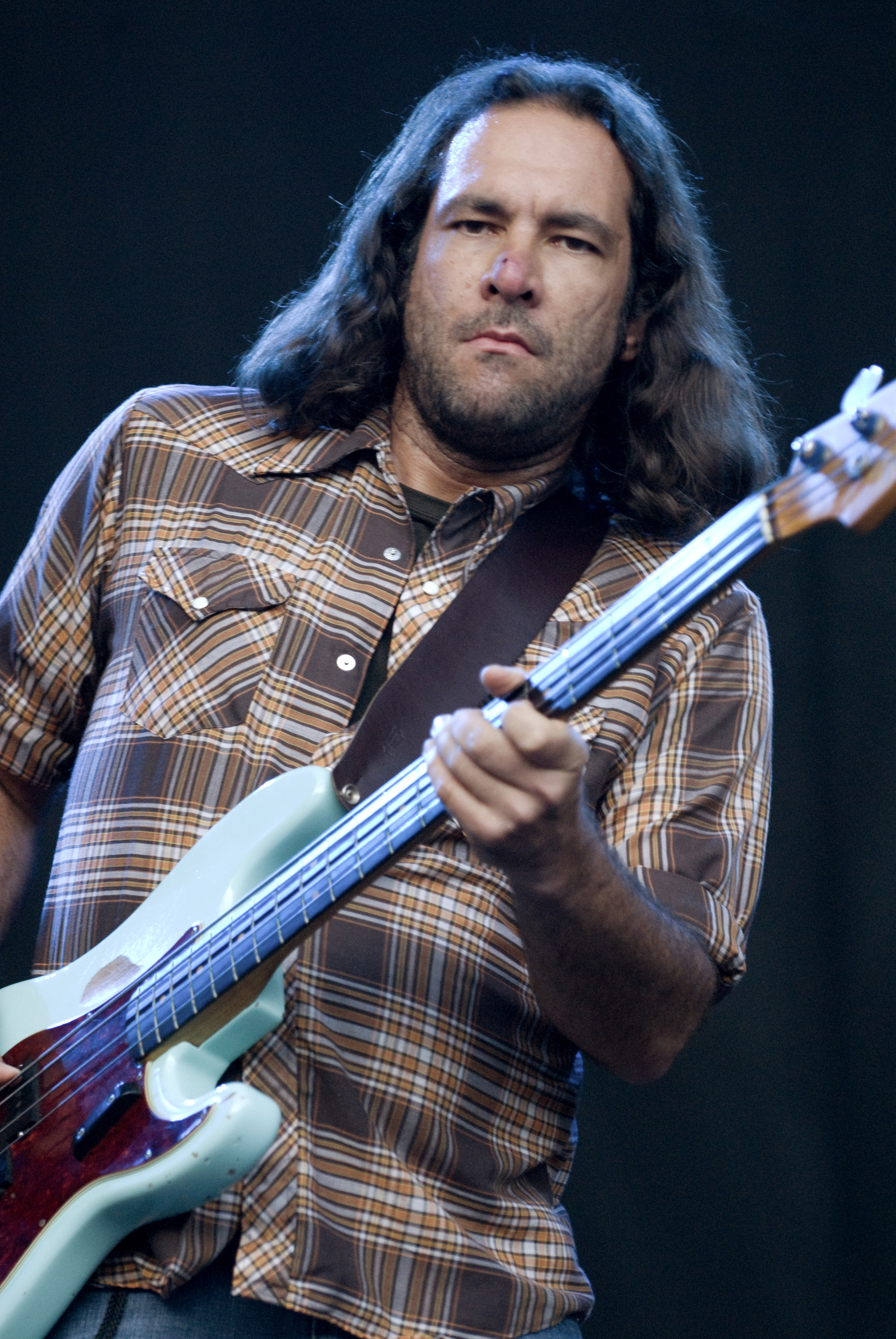
- Hess performing in 2007

Background information
- Born: December 4, 1966 (age 59); Washington, D.C., U.S.
- Origin: New York City, U.S.
- Genres: Southern rock, rock
- Instrument: Bass guitar
- Years active: 1990–present
- Website: Andy Hess

Andy Hess (born December 4, 1966) is an American bass guitarist perhaps best known a member of Gov't Mule from 2003 to 2008.

Hess also worked with The Black Crowes from February 2001 until their hiatus early the following year. He has also played in Joan Osborne's band and has done session work for artists including David Byrne and Tina Turner, and recorded on two albums with jazz guitarist John Scofield: Up All Night (2003) and Überjam Deux (2013).

Hess has toured with Steve Kimock.

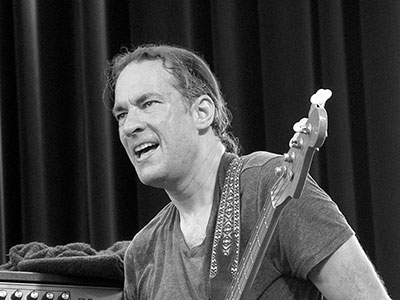
Andy Hess performing with John Scofield in Arhus, Denmark (2014)
