= Past Present (John Scofield album) =

Studio album by John Scofield
- Released: September 25, 2015
- Recorded: March 16– 17, 2015
- Studio: Carriage House Studios (Stamford, Connecticut)
- Genre: Jazz
- Length: 52:23
- Label: Impulse!
- Producer: John Scofield

John Scofield chronology
Sco-Mule (2015)	Past Present (2015)	Country for Old Men (2016)

Past Present is an album by jazz guitarist John Scofield that was recorded in March and released in September of 2015. Scofield is joined by saxophonist Joe Lovano, bassist Larry Grenadier and drummer Bill Stewart. This album reunited Scofield with Lovano and Stewart, who had been members of his quartet on Meant to Be (1991) and What We Do (1993). Lovano had also appeared on Time on My Hands (1990) and Oh! (under the group name “ScoLoHoFo”).

The album earned Scofield a Grammy Award for Best Jazz Instrumental Album. The title track was nominated for Best Improvised Jazz Solo Grammy.

== Track listing ==
All songs written by John Scofield.

1. "Slinky" - 7:09
2. "Chap Dance" - 5:20
3. "Hangover" - 6:34
4. "Museum" - 6:30
5. "Season Creep" - 5:03
6. "Get Proud" - 5:21
7. "Enjoy the Future!" - 5:23
8. "Mr. Puffy" - 5:01
9. "Past Present" - 6:02

== Personnel ==
- John Scofield – guitars
- Joe Lovano – tenor saxophone
- Larry Grenadier – double bass
- Bill Stewart – drums

Production

- Farida Bachir – executive producer, art direction
- John Scofield – producer
- Jay Newland – recording, mixing
- Ian Callanan – assistant engineer
- Brian Montgomery – additional Pro Tools editing
- Mark Wilder – mastering at Battery Studios (New York, NY)
- Brian Bacchus – A&R
- Françoise Bergmann – design
- Philippe Lévy-Stab – cover and liner photography
- Cheung Ching Ming – studio liner photography
- Josef Woodard – liner notes
