= Bar Talk =

Studio album by John Scofield
- Released: 1980 ([LP album)
- Recorded: August 1980
- Studios: Celebration Studios, New York City
- Genres: Jazz, post-bop
- Label: Arista/Novus AN 3022
- Producers: John Scofield, Mark Bingham

John Scofield chronology
Four Keys (1979)	Bar Talk (1980)	Shinola (1981)

Professional ratings
Review scores
Source	Rating
AllMusic	3/5 stars

Bar Talk is an album by jazz guitarist John Scofield. It was recorded in August 1980 at Celebration Studios in New York City and produced by Mark Bingham and John Scofield. It was the first release featuring Scofield’s trio with bass guitarist Steve Swallow and drummer Adam Nussbaum.

The John Scofield Trio, established here, went on to release two live albums which were recorded sixteen months later in Munich and released on the German Enja label: Out Like a Light and Shinola. Bar Talk is stylistically very close to the later live recordings and features four Scofield compositions ("New Strings Attached", "How to Marry a Millionaire", "Fat Dancer", and "Nature Calls") along with "Never" by Swallow and "Beckon Call" written by Gary Campbell.

The album was released on the Arista subsidiary Novus label. Four of the tracks were added as bonus material on the 1990 digital re-release of the preceding album Who's Who?.

== Track listing ==
All compositions written by John Scofield except where noted.

Side A

1. "Beckon Call" (Gary Campbell) – 7:05
2. "New Strings Attached" – 6:12
3. "Never" (Steve Swallow) – 6:47

Side B

1. "How to Marry a Millionaire" – 6:35
2. "Fat Dancer" – 6:55
3. "Nature Calls" – 5:44

== Personnel ==
- John Scofield - electric guitar
- Steve Swallow - bass
- Adam Nussbaum - drums
