= Electric Outlet =

Studio album by John Scofield
- Released: 1984
- Recorded: April – May 1984
- Studio: Gramavision Studios (New York, NY)
- Genre: Jazz fusion
- Length: 40:41
- Label: Gramavision
- Producer: John Scofield; Steve Swallow

John Scofield chronology
Who's Who? (1979)	Electric Outlet (1984)	Solar (1984)

Professional ratings
Review scores
Source	Rating
AllMusic	3/5 stars
The Penguin Guide to Jazz Recordings	2/4 stars
The Rolling Stone Jazz Record Guide	4/5 stars

Electric Outlet is a studio album by jazz guitarist John Scofield. Featured musicians include alto saxophonist David Sanborn, trombonist Ray Anderson and keyboardist Pete Levin. Scofield also plays overdub guitar with octaver to replace bass guitar.

== Track listing ==
All tracks are written by John Scofield.

No.	Title	Length
1.	"Just My Luck"	5:21
2.	"Big Break"	5:15
3.	"Best Western"	5:41
4.	"Pick Hits"	6:03
5.	"Filibuster"	5:51
6.	"Thanks Again"	4:50
7.	"King for a Day"	2:28
8.	"Phone Home"	5:12

== Personnel ==
- John Scofield – guitars, bass, Oberheim DMX
- Pete Levin – synthesizers
- Steve Jordan – drums
- David Sanborn – alto saxophone
- Ray Anderson – trombone

=== Production ===
- Jonathan F. P. Rose – executive producer
- John Scofield – producer
- Steve Swallow – producer
- Joe Ferla – engineer
- Bob Ludwig – mastering at Masterdisk (New York, NY)
- M&Co. – cover design, artwork
- Britain Hill – photography
