= John Scofield =

American jazz guitarist and composer (born 1951)

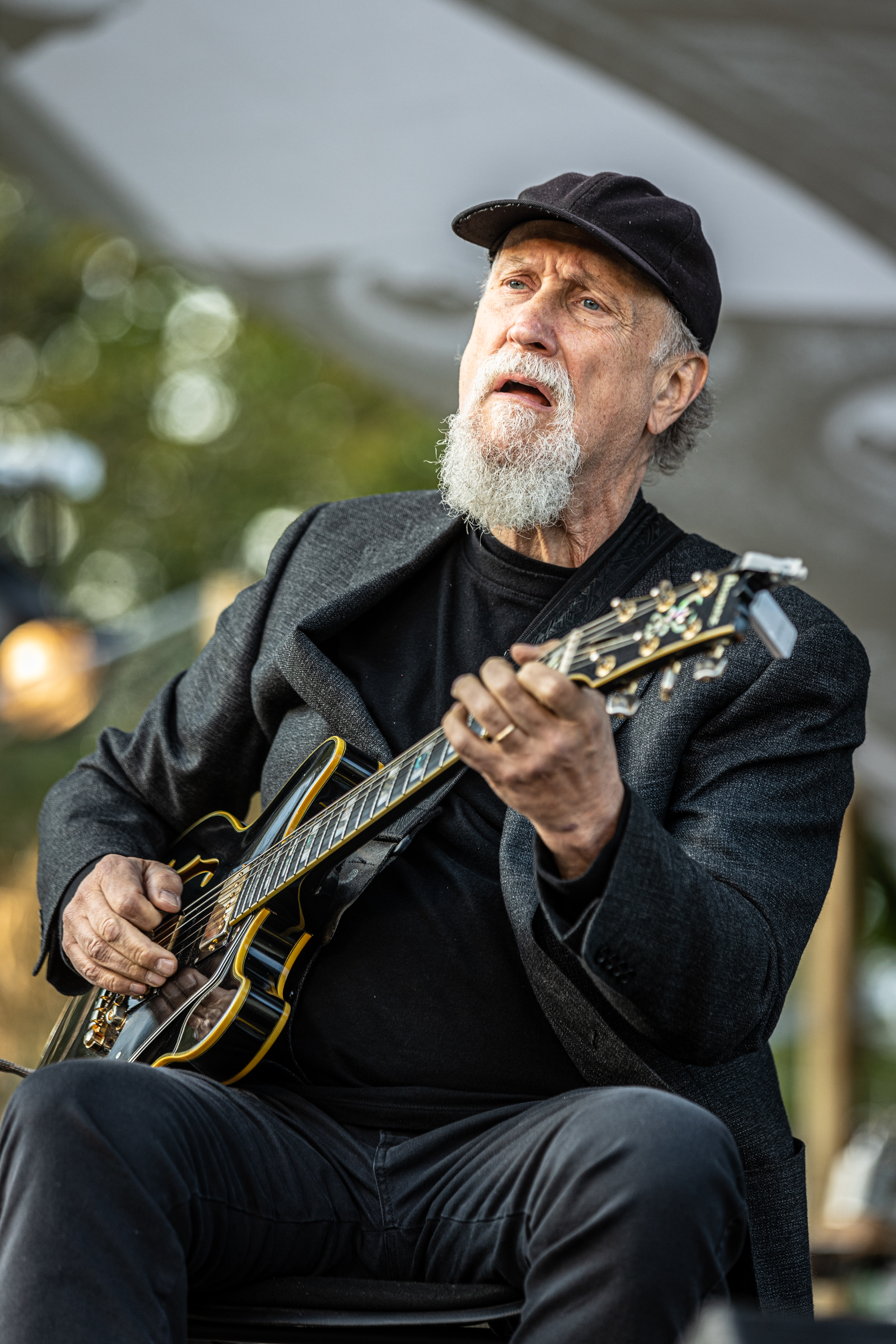
- Scofield at the Moers Festival in 2021

Background information
- Born: December 26, 1951 (age 74); Dayton, Ohio, U.S.
- Genres: Jazz, jazz fusion, acid jazz
- Occupations: Musician, composer
- Instrument: Guitar
- Years active: 1970s–present
- Labels: Enja, Gramavision, Blue Note, Verve, EmArcy, ECM, Motema
- Website: www.johnscofield.com

John Scofield (born December 26, 1951) is an American guitarist and composer. His music blends jazz, jazz fusion, funk, blues, soul and rock. He first came to mainstream attention as part of the band of Miles Davis.

He has been nominated for nine Grammy awards and won three. He was also awarded the French Ordre des Arts et des Lettres.

He has toured and recorded with jazz saxophonists Eddie Harris, Dave Liebman, Joe Henderson, and Joe Lovano; keyboardists George Duke, Joey DeFrancesco, Herbie Hancock, Larry Goldings, and Robert Glasper; fellow guitarists Pat Metheny, John Abercrombie, Pat Martino, and Bill Frisell; bassists Marc Johnson and Jaco Pastorius; and drummers Jack DeJohnette, Billy Cobham, and Dennis Chambers. Outside the world of jazz, he has collaborated with Phil Lesh, Mavis Staples, John Mayer, Medeski Martin & Wood, and Gov't Mule.

== Biography ==
John Scofield was born in Dayton, Ohio and his family moved to Wilton, Connecticut. Educated at the Berklee College of Music, Scofield left school to record with Chet Baker and Gerry Mulligan. He joined the Billy Cobham/George Duke Band soon afterwards and played, recorded, and toured with them for two years. He recorded with Charles Mingus in 1976 and replaced Pat Metheny in Gary Burton's quartet.

In 1976, Scofield signed with Enja, which released his first album, John Scofield, in 1977. He recorded with pianist Hal Galper on Rough House in 1978 and then on Galper's album Ivory Forest (1980), where he played a solo rendition of "Monk's Mood" by Thelonious Monk. In 1979 he formed a trio with his mentor Steve Swallow and Adam Nussbaum which, with drummer Bill Stewart replacing Nussbaum, became the signature group of Scofield's career.

In 1982, he joined Miles Davis, with whom he remained for three and a half years. He contributed tunes and guitar to three of Davis's albums, Star People, Decoy, and You're Under Arrest. After he left Davis, he released Electric Outlet (1984) and Still Warm (1985)

He began his Blue Matter Band with Dennis Chambers on drums, Gary Grainger on bass, and Mitchel Forman, Robert Aries, or Jim Beard on keyboards. The band released the albums Blue Matter, Loud Jazz and Pick Hits Live. Marc Johnson formed Bass Desires with Peter Erskine, Bill Frisell, and Scofield. They recorded two albums, Bass Desires (1986) and Second Sight (1987).

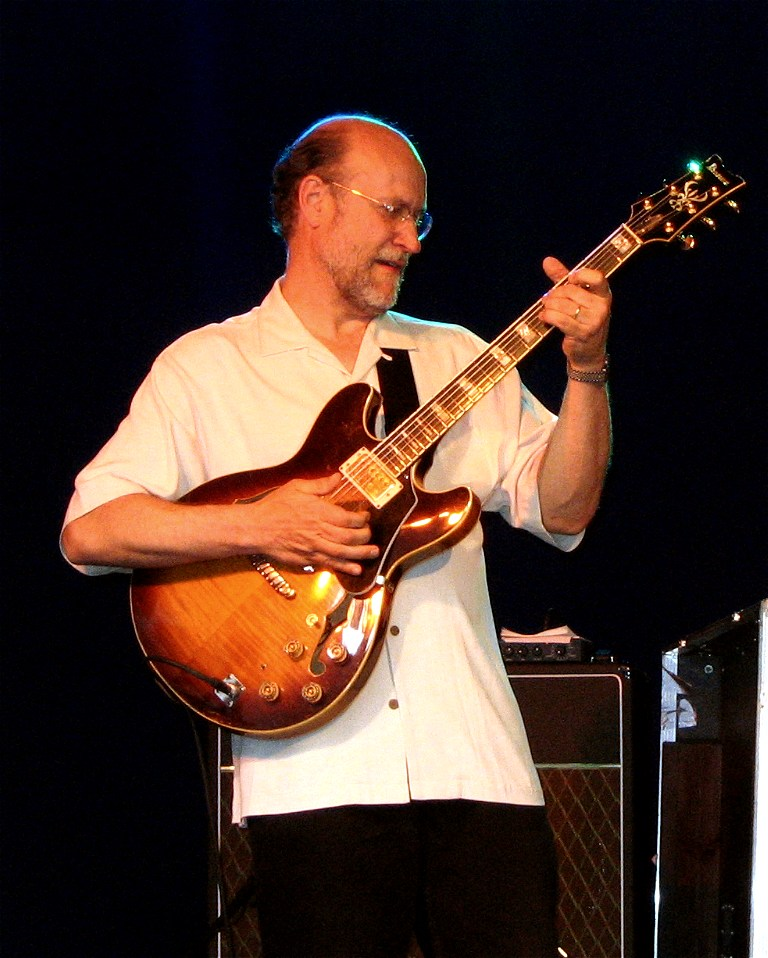
Onstage in 2004

At the beginning of the 1990s, Scofield formed a quartet which included Joe Lovano with whom he recorded several albums for Blue Note. Time on My Hands (1990), with Joe Lovano, Charlie Haden, and Jack DeJohnette, showcased Scofield's guitar and Charles Mingus-influenced writing. Bill Stewart became the group's drummer and played on Meant to Be (1991) and What We Do (1993). In 1992, Scofield released Grace Under Pressure, featuring guitarist Bill Frisell, with Charlie Haden on bass and Joey Baron on drums. Stewart rejoined Scofield and Steve Swallow for I Can See Your House from Here, a collaboration with Pat Metheny.

Near the end of the period when he was recording for Blue Note, Scofield returned to a sound which included more funk and soul jazz. In 1994 and 1995, he formed a group with organist/pianist Larry Goldings, bassist Dennis Irwin, and alternating drummers, Bill Stewart and Idris Muhammad. The group toured extensively, and the albums Hand Jive and Groove Elation feature this funk/groove/soul-jazz dimension in Scofield's music with tenor saxophonist Eddie Harris, percussionist Don Alias, and trumpeter Randy Brecker. He recorded the 1997 album A Go Go with Medeski, Martin & Wood.

Also during that time he began to work with British composer Mark-Anthony Turnage. He appeared as a soloist on Turnage's Blood on the Floor: Elegy for Andy. They collaborated on Scorched, an album of Turnage's orchestrations of Scofield's compositions, largely from the Blue Matter period. John Patitucci and Peter Erskine performed at the live premiere of Scorched at the Alte Oper in Frankfurt in September 2002 with the Radio-Symphony-Orchestra Frankfurt and the hr-Bigband. The performance was recorded and released by Deutsche Grammophon.

Scofield released Überjam in 2002 and Up All Night in 2003, two albums on which he experimented with drum and bass. He recorded in Europe with the Bugge Wesseltoft New Conception of Jazz in 2001–2002 and 2006. In 2004 EnRoute: John Scofield Trio LIVE was released with Steve Swallow on bass and Bill Stewart on drums. It was recorded live at the Blue Note Jazz Club in New York City in December 2003. That was followed the next year by That's What I Say: John Scofield Plays the Music of Ray Charles which led to performances with Mavis Staples, Gary Versace on organ, John Benitez on bass, and Steve Hass on drums. After sitting in for two engagements in December 2005 with Phil Lesh and Friends, Scofield has played numerous shows with the band.

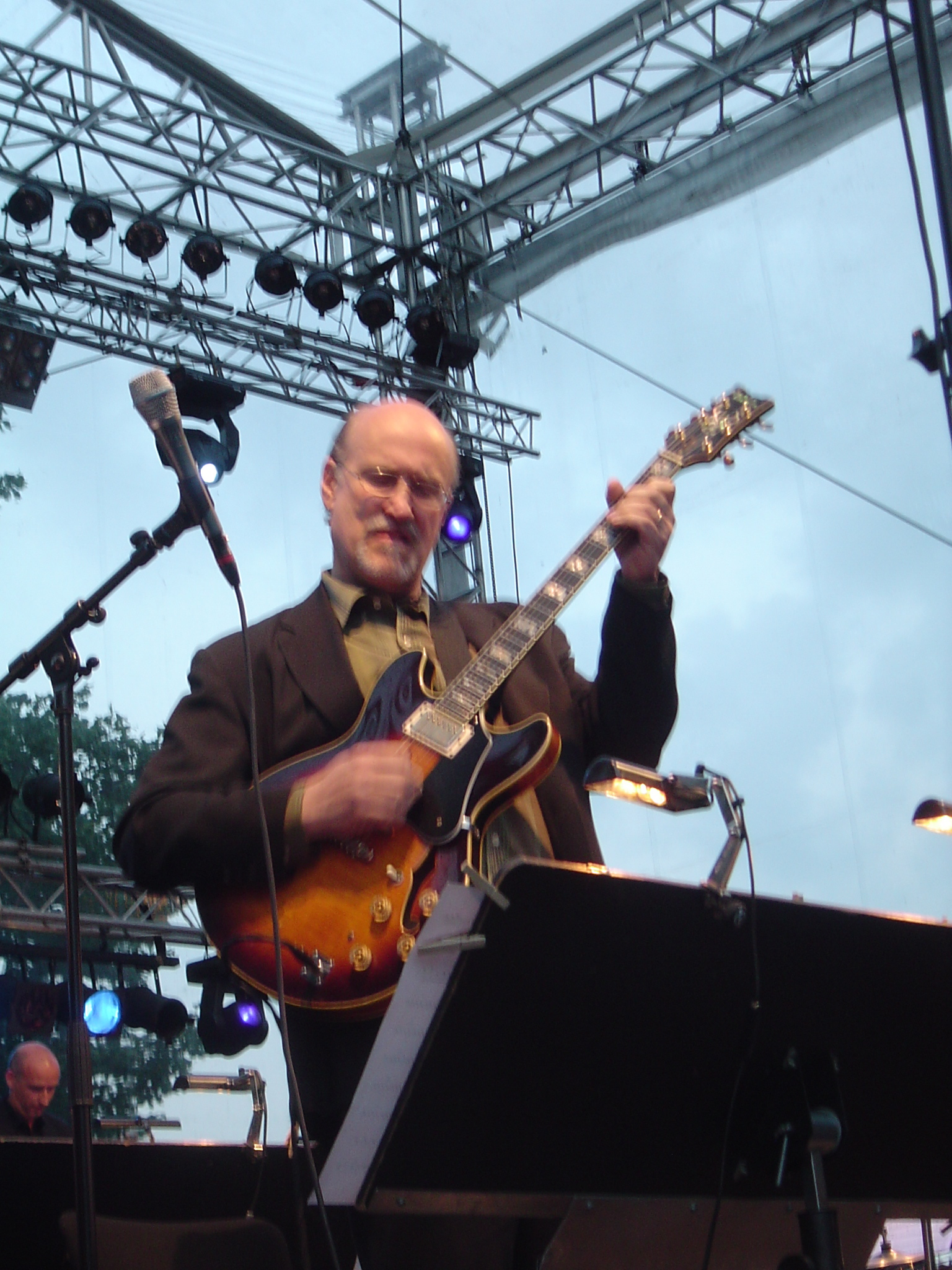
At the International Jazz Festival in Enschede, The Netherlands in 2007

On September 26, 2006, he released Out Louder, his second collaboration with Medeski, Martin & Wood. The group, known collectively as MSMW, toured worldwide in 2006 and 2007. Scofield performed in a duo with John Medeski named The Johns and in a trio with Medeski and drummer Adam Deitch (Deitch is also a producer). He recorded music inspired by gospel on the 2009 album Piety Street with Jon Cleary and George Porter Jr.

On September 18, 2007, EmArcy released This Meets That, an album recorded with Steve Swallow, Bill Stewart, and a horn trio. In 2011 EmArcy released A Moment's Peace, recorded with pianist Larry Goldings, bassist Scott Colley, and drummer Brian Blade. Scofield's 2010 album 54 had its origin in the 1990s when Vince Mendoza asked him to play on Mendoza's first album. As director of the Metropole Orchestra, Mendoza collaborated with Scofield on arrangements of Scofield's compositions that were performed by the orchestra.

Scofield has been an adjunct faculty member in the Jazz Department in the Steinhardt School of Education at New York University. Inside Scofield, a film by Joerg Steineck, a feature-length documentary about Scofield, was released in 2022.

== Guitars ==
Scofield's first electric guitar was a Hagstrom; his "workhorse" is an Ibanez AS200 from 1982. He endorses Ibanez and the company has a line of semi-hollow bodied guitars named for him. Steve Vai uses one on the road, for one of the songs from Inviolate.

== Awards and honors ==
- 1997: Honorary Doctorate of Music from Berklee
- 1998: Miles Davis Award, Montreal International Jazz Festival
- 2002: Grammy nomination for Best Contemporary Jazz Album: Überjam
- 2004: Grammy nomination for Best Contemporary Jazz Album: Scorched, and Best Jazz Instrumental Solo for "Wee"
- 2006: Grammy nomination for Best Jazz Instrumental Album, Individual or Group: Trio Beyond – Saudades
- 2010: Grammy nomination for Best Large Jazz Ensemble Album: 54 featured with Metropole Orkest conducted by Vince Mendoza
- 2010: Ordre des Arts et des Lettres, French Ministry of Culture
- 2016: Grammy Award for Best Jazz Instrumental Album: Past Present, and nominated for Best Improvised Jazz Solo: "Past Present"
- 2017: Grammy Award for Best Jazz Instrumental Album: Country for Old Men
- 2017: Grammy Award for Best Improvised Jazz Solo: "I'm So Lonesome I Could Cry"

== Discography ==
=== As leader/co-leader ===
Year released	Album title	Line-up	Label	Recording date	Notes
1978	John Scofield; Also released as East Meets West (Black Hawk, 1987)	Trio plus Terumasa Hino on two tracks	Trio (JP)	1977–08	Recorded in Tokyo
1978	John Scofield Live	Quartet	Enja	1977–11	Live in Munich
1979	Rough House	Quartet as John Scofield Quartet	Enja	1978–11	
1979	Who's Who?	Quintet and two quartet tracks	Arista Novus	1979	Re-released 1990 with the four originals from Bar Talk as bonus tracks
1980	Bar Talk	Trio w/ Steve Swallow and Adam Nussbaum	Arista Novus	1980–08	
1982	Shinola	Trio w/ Swallow and Nussbaum	Enja	1981–12	Live in Munich
1983	Out Like a Light	Trio w/ Swallow and Nussbaum	Enja	1981–12	Live recording from the same concert venue as Shinola
1984	Solar	with John Abercrombie, duos and three quartet tracks	Palo Alto	1982–05, 1983–12	
1984	Electric Outlet	Quintet w/ David Sanborn and Ray Anderson	Gramavision	1984–04 – 1984–05	Scofield plays also bass and DMX drum machine
1986	Still Warm	Quartet	Gramavision	1985–06	
1987	Blue Matter	Quintet and sextet, first w/ Gary Grainger and Dennis Chambers	Gramavision	1986–09	
1988	Loud Jazz	Quintet	Gramavision	1987–12	
1988	Pick Hits Live	Quartet	Gramavision	1987–10	Live in Tokyo
1989	Flat Out	Quintet	Gramavision	1988–12	
1990	Time on My Hands	Quartet w/ Joe Lovano. Acoustic jazz supergroup featuring Charlie Haden and Jack DeJohnette.	Blue Note	1989–11	
1991	Meant to Be	Quartet w/ Joe Lovano, Marc Johnson, and Bill Stewart	Blue Note	1990–12	
1992	Grace Under Pressure	Quartet w/ Bill Frisell plus horn section on half of the tracks	Blue Note	1991–12	Frisell and Scofield had previously partnered in Marc Johnson's Bass Desires
1993	What We Do	Quartet w/ Joe Lovano, Dennis Irwin, and Bill Stewart	Blue Note	1992–05	
1994	I Can See Your House from Here	with Pat Metheny, quartet	Blue Note	1993–12	
1994	Hand Jive	Sextet. Soul jazz session featuring saxophonist Eddie Harris two years before Harris's death.	Blue Note	1993–10	
1995	Groove Elation	Quartet plus horn section and percussion. Soul jazz session featuring the New Orleans style drumming of Idris Muhammad and organ by Larry Goldings.	Blue Note	1995	
1996	Quiet	Trio plus horn section, feat. Wayne Shorter on three tracks	Verve	1996–04	Scofield plays exclusively acoustic guitar, focus on arrangements, some light jazz waltzing and bossa nova, appropriate title
1998	A Go Go	with Medeski Martin & Wood	Verve	1998	First collaboration with avant-jazz-funk organ trio
1999	Old Folks	Duo with David Friesen	West Wind	1993–04	Conceptual compilation of equally dealt four leaders with Kenny Garrett, Michael Brecker and David Friesen
2000	Bump	Duo to quintet in altering constellations	Verve	1999	Scofield plays acoustic guitar on some tracks and adds more sound effects, opens further up to (slightly) younger musicians like Tony Scherr, Kenny Wollesen and Mark De Gli Antoni introducing electronica
2001	Works for Me	Quintet w/ Kenny Garrett, Brad Mehldau, and Billy Higgins	Verve	2000–01	Contemporary post-bop line-up and repertoire
2002	Überjam	Überjam quartet up to sextet as The John Scofield Band, first time with Avi Bortnick and Jesse Murphy and Adam Deitch plus John Medeski	Verve	2001–07, 2001–08, 2001–09	With more effects, reaching into dub reggae, jungle grooves, rap and samples
2003	Oh!	Acoustic jazz quartet as ScoLoHoFo w/ Joe Lovano, Dave Holland and Al Foster	Blue Note	2002–07	
2003	Up All Night	Überjam quartet plus horns as The John Scofield Band with Andy Hess, bass guitar	Verve	2002–12, 2003–01	
2004	Scorched	with Mark-Anthony Turnage	Deutsche Grammophon	2002–09	
2004	John Scofield Trio LIVE EnRoute	Trio w/ Swallow and Bill Stewart	Verve	2003–12	Live in New York City
2005	That's What I Say: John Scofield Plays the Music of Ray Charles	Steve Jordan, Willie Weeks, Larry Goldings with guest appearances by John Mayer, Warren Haynes, Mavis Staples, Issac Hayes	Verve	2004–12	
2006	Saudades	as Trio Beyond w/ Larry Goldings and Jack DeJohnette	ECM	2004–11	One-time Tony Williams tribute band
2006	Out Louder	as Medeski Scofield Martin & Wood	Indirecto	2006–01	First recording of Medeski, Scofield Martin & Wood partnership with co-equal contributions from Scofield and Medeski Martin & Wood
2007	This Meets That	Trio w/ Swallow and Bill Stewart plus horn section	EmArcy	2006–09 – 2007–04	
2009	Piety Street	Quartet feat. vocals	EmArcy	2009?	
2011	A Moment's Peace	Quartet	EmArcy	2011?	
2011	MSMW Live: In Case the World Changes Its Mind	as Medeski Scofield Martin & Wood	EmArcy	2011?	[2CD] Live
2013	Überjam Deux	Überjam	EmArcy	2013–01	Follow-up to Überjam (2002) and Up All Night (2003)
2014	Juice	as Medeski Scofield Martin & Wood	Indirecto	2014	
2015	Past Present	Quartet w/ Joe Lovano, Larry Grenadier and Bill Stewart	Impulse!	2015–03	
2016	Country for Old Men	Quartet w/ Larry Goldings, Steve Swallow and Bill Stewart	Impulse!	2016–04	
2017	Hudson	Quartet w/ Jack DeJohnette, Larry Grenadier and John Medeski	Motéma	2017–01	
2018	Combo 66	Quartet w/ Gerald Clayton, Bill Stewart and Vicente Archer	Verve	2018–04	
2020	Swallow Tales	Trio w/ Steve Swallow and Bill Stewart	ECM	2019–03	
2022	John Scofield	Solo	ECM	2021–08	
2023	Uncle John's Band	Trio w Vicente Archer and Bill Stewart	ECM	2022–08	[2CD]
2025	Memories of Home	Duo with Dave Holland	ECM	2024–08	

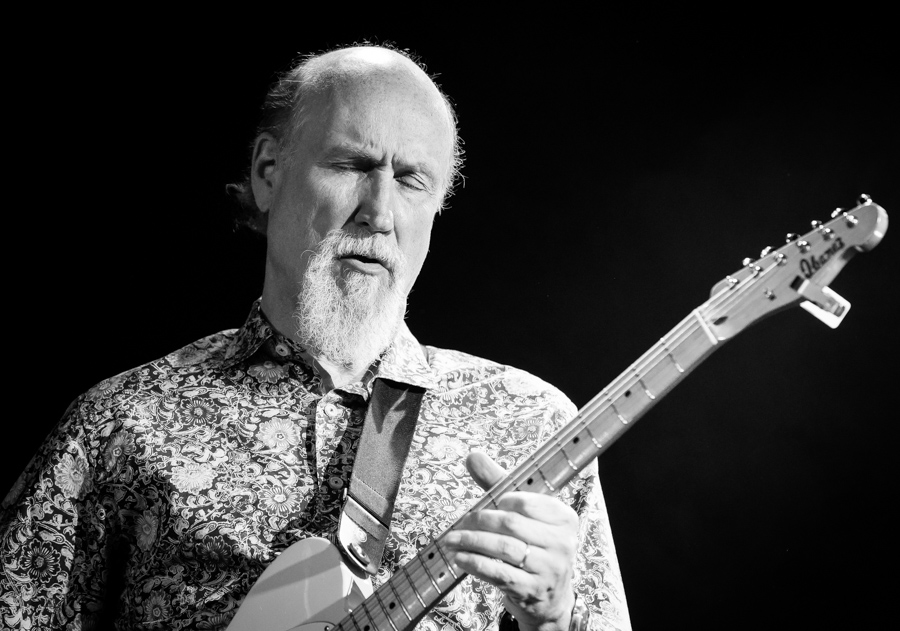
John Scofield in 2017

=== Compilations ===
- Slo Sco: The Best of the Ballads (Gramavision, 1990)
- Liquid Fire: The Best of John Scofield (Gramavision, 1994)
- Best of John Scofield (Blue Note, 1996)
- Steady Groovin': The Blue Note Groove Sides (Blue Note, 2000)

=== As a sideman ===
Albums listed by year of release. (Links to artists and labels on first appearance.)

Year recorded	Artist	Album title	Label	Notes
1974	Gary Marks	Gathering	Arewea	
1974	Gerry Mulligan and Chet Baker	Carnegie Hall Concert	CTI	Released in 1975
1975	Billy Cobham	A Funky Thide of Sings	Atlantic	
1976	Billy Cobham	Life & Times	Atlantic	
1976	Billy Cobham & George Duke	Live on Tour in Europe	Atlantic	
1977	Chet Baker	You Can't Go Home Again	Horizon	
1977	Charles Mingus	Three or Four Shades of Blues	Atlantic	
1977	Jeremy Steig	Firefly	CTI	
1977	Urbie Green	Señor Blues	CTI	
1977	Terumasa Hino	May Dance	Flying Disk	
1977	Chet Baker	The Best Thing for You	A&M	Released in 1989
1977	Jay McShann	The Last of the Blue Devils	Atlantic	Released in 1978
1978	Billy Cobham	Inner Conflicts	Atlantic	2 tracks
1978	Miroslav Vitous	Guardian Angels	Trio (JP)	Released in 1979
1978	Jay McShann	The Big Apple Bash	Atlantic	Released in 1979
1979	Jim McNeely	The Plot Thickens	Muse	
1979	Niels-Henning Ørsted Pedersen	Dancing on the Tables	SteepleChase	
1979	Zbigniew Seifert	Passion	Capitol	
1979	Martial Solal, Lee Konitz, John Scofield, Niels-Henning Ørsted Pedersen	Four Keys	MPS	
1979	Jack Walrath	Demons in Pursuit	Gatemouth	
1979	Joe Beck & Larry Coryell	Tributaries	Arista Novus	
1979	Hal Galper	Ivory Forest	Enja	Released in 1980
1979	Dave Liebman	Doin' It Again	Timeless	Released in 1980
1980	Dave Liebman	What It Is	Columbia	
1980	Ron McClure	Descendants	Ken	
1980	Dave Liebman	If They Only Knew	Timeless	Released in 1981
1981	Bill Goodwin	Solar Energy	Omni Sound Jazz	
1982	Peter Warren	Solidarity	JAPO	
1983	Miles Davis	Star People	Columbia	2 tracks
1983	Jim Pepper	Comin' and Goin'	Antilles	
1983	Miles Davis	Decoy	Columbia	Released in 1984
1984	George Adams	More Sightings	Enja	
1984	Eero Koivistoinen	Picture in Three Colours	Pro	Three further tracks of this 1983 session in New York were released by the Finnish Rytmi magazine
1984	Bennie Wallace	Sweeping Through the City	Enja	
1984, 1985	Miles Davis	The Complete Miles Davis at Montreux 1973–1991	Warner Switzerland	Scofield on seven of the [20CD] box set released in 2002
1984, 1985	Miles Davis	You're Under Arrest	Columbia	
1985	George Adams-Don Pullen Quartet	Live at Montmartre	Timeless	
1985	Paul Bley	Hot	Soul Note	
1985	Bennie Wallace	Twilight Time	Blue Note	
1985	Marc Johnson	Bass Desires	ECM	released in 1986
1986	Tal Farlow, John Abercrombie, Larry Carlton, Larry Coryell, John Scofield, John Patitucci & Billy Hart	All Strings Attached	Verve	Part of the 1986 concert series Jazzvisions: Made in America in Los Angeles
1986	L'Orchestre National du Jazz	Orchestre National du Jazz '86	Label Bleu	
1986	Franco Ambrosetti	Movies	Enja	released in 1987
1987	Ron McClure	Home Base	ODE	
1987	Bennie Wallace	Art of the Saxophone	Denon	
1987	Bennie Wallace	Border Town	Blue Note	
1987	Roberto Gatto	Ask	Inak	
1987	Marc Johnson	Second Sight	ECM	
1988	Franco Ambrosetti	Movies Too	Enja	
1988	Ray Anderson	Blues Bred in the Bone	Enja	
1988	Gary Burton	Times Like These	GRP	
1988	Tommy Smith	Step by Step	Blue Note	
1988	Missing Links	Groovin	MCA	2 tracks
1988	Mike Gibbs Orchestra	Big Time	Venture	
1988	Tom Harrell	Stories	Contemporary	
1988	Niels Lan Doky	Daybreak	Storyville	
1989	Richie Beirach	Some Other Time	Triloka	
1989	Terri Lyne Carrington	Real Life Story	Verve Forecast	
1989	Jim McNeely w/the WDR Big Band	East Coast Blow Out	Lipstick	Released in 1991 and reissued in 2014 on Jazzline
1989	Gary Thomas	By Any Means Necessary	JMT	
1989	Terumasa Hino	Bluestruck	Blue Note	
1989	McCoy Tyner	Things Ain't What They Used to Be	Blue Note	Released in 1990
1990	Bill Cosby & Friends	Where You Lay Your Head	Verve	
1990	Joey DeFrancesco	Where Were You?	Columbia	
1990	Manhattan Jazz Quintet	Manhattan Blues	Sweet Basil	
1990	Harvie Swartz	In a Different Light	Blue Moon	
1990	Benny Golson	Rhythmstick	CTI	
1990	John Patitucci	Sketchbook	GRP	
1991	Dennis Chambers	Getting Even	Glass House/Pioneer (JP)	
1991	Peter Erskine	Sweet Soul	Arista Novus	
1991	Eero Koivistoinen	Altered Things	Timeless	
1991	Lars Danielsson	Fresh Enough	L+R	Released in 1992
1991	Steve Swallow	Swallow	XtraWATT	Released in 1992
1991	Mike Gibbs Band	Symphony Hall, Birmingham 1991	Dusk Fire	Released in 2018
1992	Gary Burton	Six Pack	GRP	
1992	Knut Riisnæs & Jon Christensen	Knut Riisnæs – Jon Christensen Featuring John Scofield – Palle Danielsson	Odin	
1992	Jack DeJohnette	Music for the Fifth World	Capitol	Released in 1993
1992	Joe Henderson	So Near, So Far (Musings for Miles)	Verve	Released in 1993
1993	Jimmy Haslip	A R C	UMG	
1993	Lee Konitz	Rhapsody II	Evidence	Released in 1994
1994	David Friesen	Two for the Show	ITM Pacific	
1994	Ray Drummond	Continuum	Arabesque	
1995	Ron Holloway	Struttin	Milestone	
1995	Lenny White	Present Tense	Hip Bop	
1995	Herbie Hancock	The New Standard	Verve	Released in 1996
1996	Teodross Avery	My Generation	Impulse!	
1996	Gary Burton	Departure	Concord Jazz	Released in 1997
1997	Joe Henderson	Porgy & Bess	Verve	
1997	Chris Potter	Unspoken	Concord Jazz	
1998	Mark-Anthony Turnage	Blood on the Floor	Decca	
1998	John Patitucci	Now	Concord Jazz	
1999	Joe Henderson	Quiet Now: Lovesome Thing	Verve	2 tracks
1999	Tommy Smith	Blue Smith	Linn	
1999	Ulrik / Scofield / Danielsson / Erskine	Shortcuts – Jazzpar Combo 1999	Stunt	Released in 2000
1999	Gov't Mule Featuring John Scofield	Sco-Mule	Provogue	Released in 2015
2000	Jon Gordon	Possibilities	Double-Time	
2000	Bill Evans (saxophonist)	Soul Insider	ESC	2 tracks
2001	Metalwood	The Recline	Verve	
2001	Project Logic with John Scofield	Sharin' in the Groove	Who Is She Music?	Charity tribute album for Phish and The Mockingbird Foundation. Guitar on "Cars Trucks Buses".
2002	Chris Potter	Traveling Mercies	Verve	
2002	Roy Haynes	Love Letters	Eighty-Eight's	
2002	Bugge Wesseltoft	New Conception of Jazz Live	Jazzland Recordings	1 track. Released in 2003.
2004	Marc Johnson	Shades of Jade	ECM	Released in 2005
2005	John Ellis	One Foot in the Swamp	Hyena	
2006	Phil Lesh and Friends	Live at the Warfield	Image	[2DVD-Video]
2006	Keller Williams	Dream	SCI Fidelity	Released in 2007
2009	Assembly of Dust	Some Assembly Required	Rock Ridge Music	1 track
2009	Metropole Orkest Featuring John Scofield	54	EmArcy	Released in 2010
2009	Eddie Henderson	For All We Know	Furthermore	Released in 2010
2021	Scary Goldings	Scary Goldings IV	Pockets Inc.	
