= A Moment's Peace =

Studio album by John Scofield
- Released: May 2, 2011
- Studio: Sear Sound, New York City
- Genre: Jazz
- Length: 64:30
- Label: Emarcy
- Producer: John Scofield

John Scofield chronology
54 (2010)	A Moment's Peace (2011)	Überjam Deux (2013)

Professional ratings
Review scores
Source	Rating
Allmusic	3.5/5 stars
All About Jazz	

A Moment's Peace is a 2011 studio album by jazz guitarist John Scofield, with keyboardist Larry Goldings, bassist Scott Colley and drummer Brian Blade.

== Track listing ==
All songs written by John Scofield except as indicated.

1. "Simply Put" – 5:30
2. "I Will" (Lennon–McCartney) – 3:16
3. "Lawns" (Carla Bley) – 6:32
4. "Throw It Away" (Abbey Lincoln) – 6:05
5. "I Want to Talk About You" (Billy Eckstein) – 7:56
6. "Gee, Baby, Ain't I Good to You" (Andy Razaf, Don Redman) – 5:01
7. "Johan" – 5:11
8. "Mood Returns" – 4:27
9. "Already September" – 5:33
10. "You Don't Know What Love Is" (Gene De Paul, Don Raye) – 6:00
11. "Plain Song" – 5:01
12. "I Loves You Porgy" (George & Ira Gershwin) – 3:59

== Personnel ==
- John Scofield – guitars
- Larry Goldings – acoustic piano, organ
- Scott Colley – bass
- Brian Blade – drums

=== Production ===
- John Scofield – producer
- James Farber – engineer, mixing
- Chris Allen – assistant engineer
- Ted Tuthill – assistant engineer
- Brian Montgomery – digital editing
- Greg Calbi – mastering at Sterling Sound (New York, NY)
- Susan Scofield – project coordinator, design concept
- Mark Hess (HessDesignWorks.com) – design
- Robin Johnston – cover photography
- Maggie Hopp – additional photography
