= That's What I Say: John Scofield Plays the Music of Ray Charles =

Studio album by John Scofield
- Released: June 7, 2005
- Recorded: December 2004
- Studio: Avatar Studios and Right Track Recording (New York City, New York)
- Genre: Jazz
- Length: 65:21
- Label: Verve
- Producer: Steve Jordan

John Scofield chronology
EnRoute: John Scofield Trio LIVE (2004)	That's What I Say: John Scofield Plays the Music of Ray Charles (2005)	Out Louder (2006)

Professional ratings
Review scores
Source	Rating
AllMusic	3.5/5 stars
All About Jazz	3.5/5 stars
All About Jazz	4.5/5 stars
The Penguin Guide to Jazz Recordings	3/4 stars

That's What I Say: John Scofield Plays the Music of Ray Charles is a Ray Charles tribute album by John Scofield. Some of the album’s guests include Dr. John, Warren Haynes, John Mayer, Mavis Staples and Aaron Neville. Longtime Charles bandleader David “Fathead” Newman plays tenor saxophone.

== Track listing ==
No.	Title	Writer(s)	Length
1.	"Busted"	Harlan Howard	6:31
2.	"What'd I Say"	Ray Charles	6:18
3.	"Sticks and Stones"	Henry Glover, Titus Turner	3:44
4.	"I Don't Need No Doctor"	Jo Armstead, Nick Ashford, Valerie Simpson	4:30
5.	"Cryin' Time"	Buck Owens	1:33
6.	"I Can't Stop Loving You"	Don Gibson	4:48
7.	"Hit the Road Jack"	Percy Mayfield	5:29
8.	"Talkin' 'bout You/I Got a Woman"	Ray Charles	5:50
9.	"Unchain My Heart (Part 1)"	Robert Sharp, Teddy Powell	5:05
10.	"Let's Go Get Stoned"	Armstead, Ashford, Simpson	3:29
11.	"Night Time Is the Right Time"	Lew Herman	4:57
12.	"You Don't Know Me"	Cindy Walker	4:57
13.	"Georgia on My Mind"	Hoagy Carmichael, Stuart Gorrell	8:10

== Personnel ==
- John Scofield – guitar (1–10, 12, 13), arrangements (1–10, 12, 13), horn arrangements (2, 7, 8, 10) "nervous" guitar (6), finger snaps (7), Leslie guitar (11)
- Larry Goldings – Hammond B3 organ (1, 3, 5, 6, 8, 9, 12), arrangements (1), Wurlitzer electric piano (2, 6), vibraphone (2)
- Dr. John – acoustic piano (8), vocals (8)
- John Mayer – acoustic guitar (4), electric guitar (4), vocals (4)
- Warren Haynes – slide guitar (11)
- Willie Weeks – bass (2–4, 6–12)
- Steve Jordan – drums (1, 3, 4, 6, 7, 9–12), arrangements (1, 2, 11), cocktail drums (2, 8), water cooler (2), backing vocals (2, 11), finger snaps (7), tambourine (8), handclaps (11), BGV arrangements
- Manolo Badrena – percussion (2), timbales (2), Spanish speech (2), tambourine (8)
- Howard Johnson – baritone saxophone (2, 7, 8, 10, 11), "hey's and ho's" (2)
- Alex Foster – tenor saxophone (2, 7, 8, 10), "hey's and ho's" (2)
- David Newman – tenor saxophone (2, 7, 8, 10), "hey's and ho's" (2)
- Keith O'Quinn – trombone (2, 7, 8, 10), "hey's and ho's" (2)
- Earl Gardner – trumpet (2, 7, 8, 10), "hey's and ho's" (2)
- Lisa Fischer – backing vocals (2, 6, 11), handclaps (11)
- Vaneese Thomas – backing vocals (2, 6, 11), handclaps (11)
- Meegan Voss – backing vocals (2)
- Mavis Staples – vocals (6)
- Aaron Neville – vocals (12)

Vocal Ensemble on "What'd I Say"

- Dr. John, Warren Haynes, John Mayer, Aaron Neville and Mavis Staples

== Production ==
- Ronald Goldstein – executive producer
- Steve Jordan – producer
- John Scofield – co-producer
- Susan Scofield – co-producer
- Joe Ferla – recording, mixing
- Peter Doris – assistant engineer
- Chad Lupo – assistant engineer
- Bryan Pugh – assistant engineer
- Pat Thrall – Pro Tools editing
- Greg Calbi – mastering at Sterling Sound (New York, NY)
- Evelyn Morgan – A&R administration
- Dalia Ambach Caplin – A&R coordinator
- Joe McEwen – A&R coordinator
- Artie Smith – instrumental coordinator
- John Newcott – release coordinator
- Kelly Pratt – release coordinator
- Hollis King – art direction
- Kazumi Matsumoto – design
- Alan Nahigian – photography
