= Bump (album) =

Studio album by John Scofield Band
- Released: March 14, 2000
- Studios: Avatar, New York City
- Genre: Jazz
- Length: 55:36
- Label: Verve
- Producer: Lee Townsend

John Scofield chronology
Old Folks (1999)	Bump (2000)	Steady Groovin' (2000)

Professional ratings
Review scores
Source	Rating
Allmusic	3.5/5 stars
All About Jazz	(mixed)
The Penguin Guide to Jazz Recordings	3/4 stars

Bump is a studio album by jazz guitarist John Scofield that was released by Verve on March 14, 2000. The music is a fusion of Scofield's post-bop jazz compositions with funk, soul jazz and more modern touches of electronica.

== Reception ==
The album received a mixed to positive response from critics. AllMusic rated it 3.5 out of 5 stars, while All About Jazz gave it a mixed review, with critic David Adler writing that the record leaned toward dance-oriented grooves but felt one-dimensional in places, though he praised the acoustic guitar overdubs on "Three Sisters", "Beep Beep", and "Fez". The Penguin Guide to Jazz Recordings rated the album 3 out of 4 stars.

== Track listing ==
All tracks are written by John Scofield.

No.	Title	Length
1.	"Three Sisters"	5:42
2.	"Chichon"	7:21
3.	"Beep Beep"	4:17
4.	"Kelpers"	4:31
5.	"Groan Man"	7:20
6.	"Fez"	3:47
7.	"Blackout"	4:05
8.	"Kilgeffen"	2:06
9.	"We Are Not Alone"	4:32
10.	"Swinganova"	5:38
11.	"Drop and Roll"	4:59
12.	"Kilgeffen (reprise)"	1:06

== Personnel ==
- John Scofield – electric guitar, acoustic guitar (1–3, 6–8)
- Mark Degli Antoni – keyboard sampler (2–4, 6, 8, 11)
- David Livolsi – electric bass (1, 7, 11)
- Tony Scherr – electric bass (2, 8, 12), acoustic bass (5, 8–10, 12)
- Chris Wood – electric bass (3, 4), acoustic bass (6)
- Eric Kalb – drums (1, 3, 4, 6, 7, 11)
- Kenny Wollesen – drums (2, 5, 8, 9)
- Johnny Durkin – congas (1, 3, 4, 7, 11)
- Johnny Almendra – tambourine (1), bongos (5), congas (6, 10), percussion (9, 10)

=== Production ===
- Susan Scofield – executive producer
- Lee Townsend – producer
- Joe Ferla – recording, mixing
- Kevin Killen – recording
- Andrea Yankovsky – assistant engineer
- Greg Calbi – mastering at Sterling Sound (New York, NY)
- Camille Tominaro – production coordinator
- Louisa Spier – production assistant
- Stuart Pressman – release coordinator
- Robert Silverberg – release coordinator
- Hollis King – art direction
- Isabella Wong – design, graphics
- Ken Schles – photography
