= Adam Deitch =

American record producer and musician

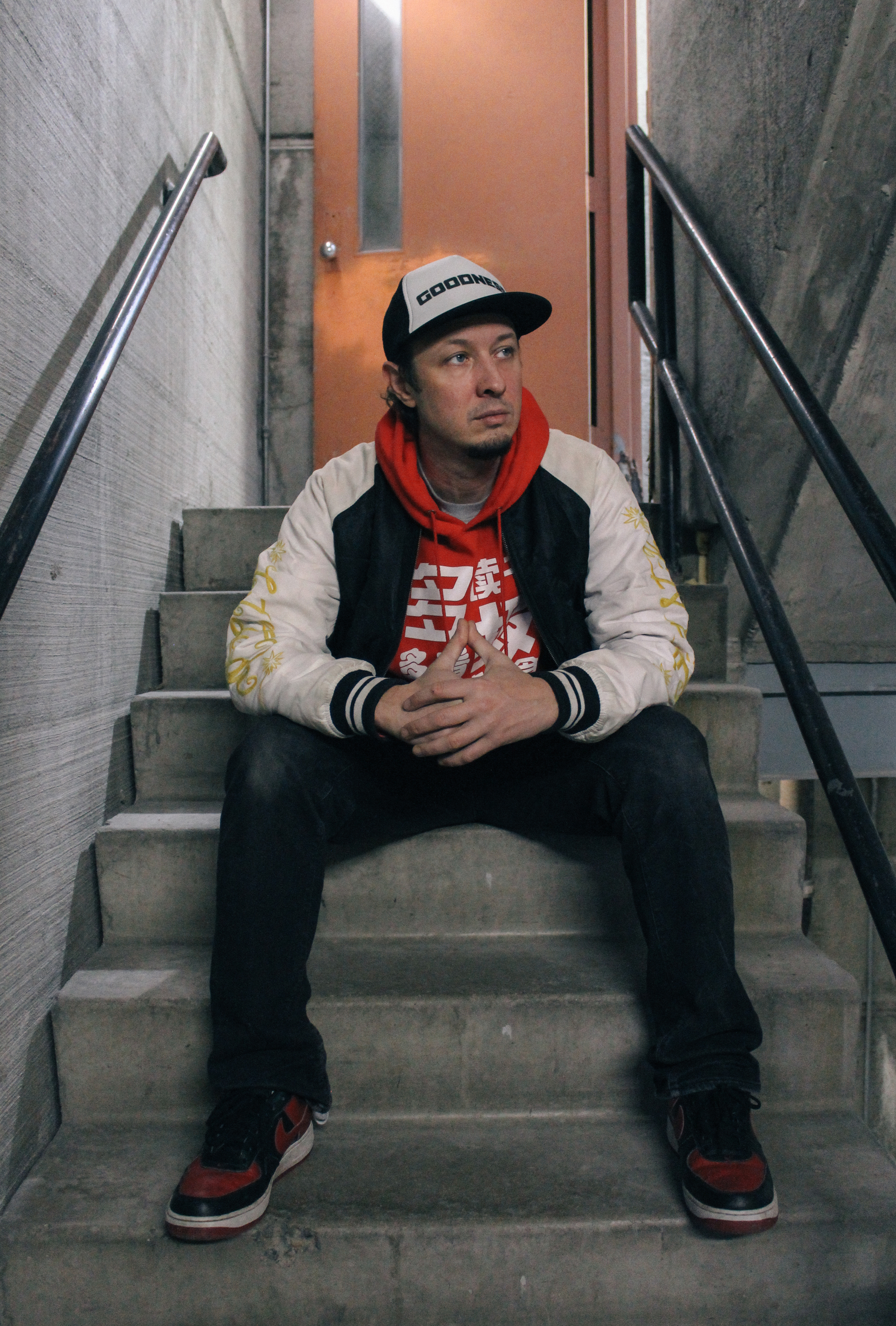
- Photo by Milo Lee

Background information
- Birth name: Adam David Deitch
- Origin: New York, New York
- Genres: Hip hop, electronica, jazz, funk
- Instruments: Drums
- Years active: 1994–present
- Labels: Golden Wolf Records, Royal Family Records, Velour Music Group, Pretty Lights Music
- Website: https://www.deitchbeatsdontquit.com/, https://deitchacademy.com/, http://www.breaksciencemusic.com

Adam David Deitch (born April 26, 1976) is a Grammy-nominated American record producer and drummer based in Denver, Colorado. He is the drummer for the bands Lettuce, Break Science, and The Adam Deitch Quartet, and has worked in the hip hop, funk, electro, pop, and jazz genres. He has collaborated with renowned artists like 50 Cent, Talib Kweli, John Scofield, Les Claypool, and Ledisi.

He was nominated for the 2010 Grammy Award for Best R&B Album for writing and producing two songs on Ledisi's album Turn Me Loose as part of the Fyre Dept. production team. He was also nominated for the 2019 Grammy Award for Best Contemporary Instrumental Album for Lettuce's album Elevate.

In 2014, Deitch started his own record label, Golden Wolf Records, through which he's released music from his solo project (Adam Deitch) and The Adam Deitch Quartet (Adam Deitch - Drums // Wil Blades - Organ // Eric “Benny” Bloom - Trumpet // Ryan Zoidis - Saxophone). Deitch also co-founded Royal Family Records.

In 2021, Deitch also launched his own subscription-based drum lesson platform, called Deitch Academy.

On April 20th, 2025, an album Juicetopher has come out, produced by Deitch and Chris Pinset.

== Discography ==
=== As producer and drummer ===
- Outta Here (Lettuce)
- Live in Tokyo (Lettuce)
- Rage! (Lettuce)
- Fly (Lettuce)
- Crush (Lettuce)
- Mt. Crushmore (Lettuce)
- Witches Stew (Lettuce)
- Elevate (Lettuce)
- Resonate (Lettuce)
- Age of Imperfection (Adam Deitch)
- Sky's Alive (Adam Deitch)
- I Get A Rush (Adam Deitch)
- Egyptian Secrets (Adam Deitch Quartet)
- Illusion (Pharoahe Monche)
- W.A.R. (We Are Renegades) (Pharoahe Monche)
- Further Than Our Eyes Can See (Break Science)
- Knockin', Say No, & Turn Me Loose Turn Me Loose (Ledisi album) (Ledisi)
- Monolith Code (Break Science)
- Seven Bridges (Break Science)
- Roll the Tape (Adam Deitch Quartet)

=== As producer ===
- My Gun Go Off Curtis (50 Cent album) (50 Cent)
- Tiger Style Crane Reggie (album) (Redman (rapper))
- The Nature Eardrum (album) (Talib Kweli)
- Scandalous Bitches Full Circle (Xzibit album) (Xzibit)
- Struggla Light (Matisyahu album) (Matisyahu)
- Controcultura, Le Donne, & Spara Al Diavolo Controcultura (Fabri Fibra)
- Harder The Hear After (J-Live)
- Juicetopher (album) Oran Juice Jones II, Chris Pinset

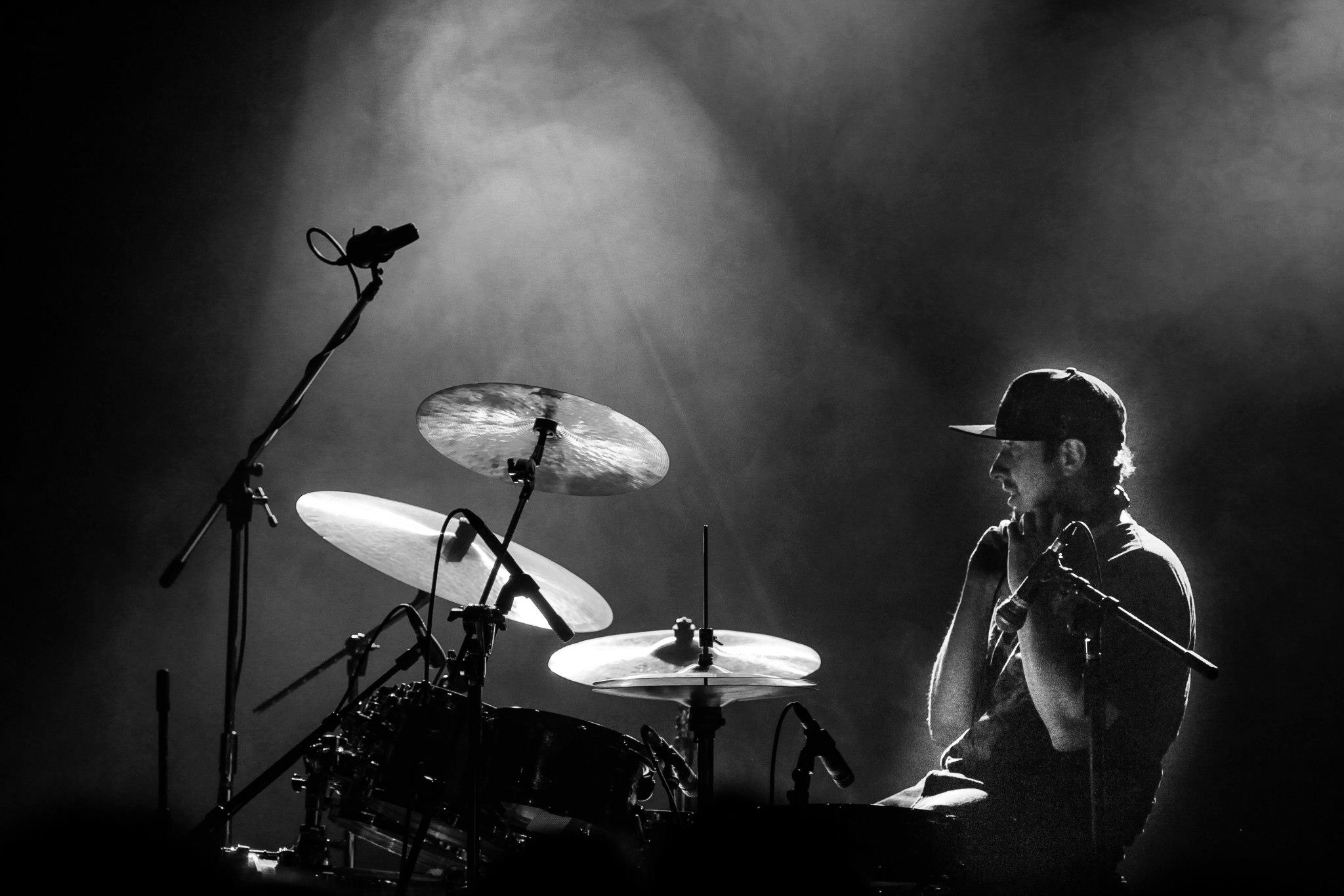

=== As drummer ===
- Überjam (John Scofield)
- Up All Night (John Scofield album) (John Scofield)
- Ladies & Thugs Trauma (album) (DJ Quik)
- Greatest Hits: Live at the House of Blues( DJ Quik)
- Tonight (DVD) (Average White Band)
- Nü Revolution (Les Nubians)
- Reminisce (Eric Krasno (Soulive))
- Pretty Lights
- The Purge (DRKWAV)
- Überjam Deux (John Scofield)
