= Works for Me =

Studio album by John Scofield
- Released: January 30, 2001
- Recorded: January 6–8, 2000
- Studio: Avatar (New York, New York); River Sound (New York, New York)
- Genre: Jazz
- Length: 71:38
- Label: Verve
- Producer: Richard Seidel

John Scofield chronology
Steady Groovin' (2000)	Works for Me (2001)	Überjam (2002)

Professional ratings
Review scores
Source	Rating
Allmusic	4.5/5 stars
The Penguin Guide to Jazz Recordings	3/4 stars

Works for Me is an album by John Scofield which was released by Verve on January 30, 2001.

== Track listing ==
All compositions by John Scofield except "Freepie" by John Scofield, Brad Mehldau, Christian McBride, Billy Higgins and Kenny Garrett.

1. "I'll Catch You" - 7:58
2. "Not You Again" - 7:09
3. "Big J" - 7:30
4. "Loose Canon" - 9:12
5. "Love You Long Time" - 6:21
6. "Hive" - 4:51
7. "Heel to Toe" - 5:21
8. "Do I Crazy?" - 6:07
9. "Mrs. Scofield's Waltz" - 6:32
10. "Six and Eight" - 8:18
11. "Freepie" - 2:15

== Personnel ==
- John Scofield – guitars
- Kenny Garrett – alto saxophone
- Brad Mehldau – acoustic piano
- Christian McBride – double bass
- Billy Higgins – drums

=== Production ===
- Susan Scofield – executive producer
- Erin Whelan – executive producer, project coordinator
- Richard Seidel – producer
- James Farber – recording, mixing
- Greg Calbi – mastering at Sterling Sound (New York, NY)
- Carrie D'Amelio – release coordinator
- Stuart Pressman – release coordinator
- Hollis King – art direction
- Isabella Wong – design
- Ken Schles – photography
- Letha Rotman – hair, make-up
- Jill Topol – styling
- John Scofield – liner notes
