= Shinola (John Scofield album) =

Live album by John Scofield
- Released: 1982
- Recorded: December 12–13, 1981
- Venue: Club Vielharmonie, Munich, Germany
- Genre: Jazz fusion
- Length: 38:41
- Label: Enja
- Producer: Horst Weber, Matthias Winckelmann

John Scofield chronology
Bar Talk (1980)	Shinola (1982)	Out Like a Light (1983)

Professional ratings
Review scores
Source	Rating
Allmusic	4/5 stars
All About Jazz	4.5/5 stars
The Rolling Stone Jazz Record Guide	3/5 stars
The Penguin Guide to Jazz Recordings	3.5/4 stars

Shinola is a live album by American jazz guitarist John Scofield, recorded in 1981 and released in 1982 by Enja Records. It was the second recording of Scofield's trio with bass guitarist Steve Swallow and drummer Adam Nussbaum. In 2009 the album was reissued on compact disc in a 24-bit remastered edition with new artwork.

== Track listing ==
All tracks are written by John Scofield except where noted.

No.	Title	Writer(s)	Length
1.	"Why'd You Do It?"		5:28
2.	"Yawn"		8:56
3.	"Dr. Jackle"	Jackie McLean	5:46
4.	"Jean the Bean"		6:42
5.	"Rags to Riches"		6:20
6.	"Shinola"		2:28
Total length:			38:41

== Personnel ==
- John Scofield – electric guitar
- Steve Swallow – bass guitar
- Adam Nussbaum – drums
