= John Scofield (2022 album) =

Studio album by John Scofield
- Released: May 6, 2022
- Recorded: August 2021
- Studio: Top Story Studio; Katonah, New York
- Genre: Jazz
- Length: 53:48
- Label: ECM 2727
- Producer: Manfred Eicher

John Scofield chronology
Swallow Tales (2020)	John Scofield (2022)	Uncle John's Band (2023)

Professional ratings
Review scores
Source	Rating
AllMusic	4/5 stars
The Daily Telegraph	4/5 stars
DownBeat	4/4 stars
Jazzwise	4/5 stars
Record Collector	3/5 stars
Stereophile	4.5/5 stars
The Times	4/5 stars
Tom Hull	B+

John Scofield is a solo studio album by American jazz guitarist John Scofield recorded in August 2021 and released on ECM May the following year.

== Composition ==
The record contains 13 tracks: Scofield's originals as well as jazz, country, and rock'n'roll standards.

== Reception ==
Thom Jurek of AllMusic stated, "Fueled by almost constant string bending and almost lush chord voicings, his inherent lyricism reflects the songwriter's poignant resignation. Scofield has distilled five decades of experience into these 13 songs. While the endeavor might initially appear slight, one listen will disavow that notion as he reveals an abundance of musical wisdom and sophistication in his approach to recording solo."

Allen Michie of The Arts Fuse commented, "A solo album offers artists an opportunity to spotlight their style and approach. There is no better way to do that than to play some standards that many others have performed before. Scofield chooses wisely, selecting some unexpected tunes that show different facets of his personality and history."

Andy Robson of Jazzwise noted, "It’s been noted by wiser men than I that for some artists, a Rollins or a Mingus, the gap between the doing and being of music simply dissolves. John Scofield has reached this stage, as perfectly exemplified by this solo album."

Chris Pearson of The Times added, "He is as fiery as ever, plugged in and using loops to give himself a background groove on some of his gritty originals or putting a punkish spin on romantic ballads."

== Track listing ==
No.	Title	Writer(s)	Length
1.	"Coral"	Keith Jarrett	2:52
2.	"Honest I Do"	Scofield	4:16
3.	"It Could Happen To You"	Jimmy Van Heusen, Johnny Burke	5:57
4.	"Danny Boy"	Traditional	4:56
5.	"Elder Dance"	Scofield	3:58
6.	"Mrs. Scofield's Waltz"	Scofield	4:21
7.	"Junco Partner"	Traditional	3:44
8.	"There Will Never Be Another You"	Harry Warren, Mack Gordon	2:52
9.	"My Old Flame"	Arthur Johnston, Sam Coslow	2:36
10.	"Not Fade Away"	Buddy Holly, Norman Petty	5:43
11.	"Since You Asked"	Scofield	4:40
12.	"Trance De Jour"	Scofield	4:23
13.	"You Win Again"	Hank Williams	3:30
Total length:			53:48

== Personnel ==
- John Scofield – electric guitars, loops

Production

- Manfred Eicher – executive producer
- Tyler McDiarmid – engineer
- Christoph Stickel – mastering
- Sascha Kleis – design
- Luciano Rossetti – cover photography
- John Scofield – liner notes
