= Heart's Content (album) =

Studio album by Peter Bernstein
- Released: May 27, 2003
- Recorded: December 14, 2002
- Studio: Systems Two Studios, Brooklyn, New York
- Genre: Jazz
- Length: 57:17
- Label: Criss Cross
- Producer: K. Hasselpflug, Gerry Teekens

Peter Bernstein chronology
Earth Tones (1997)	Heart's Content (2003)	Stranger in Paradise (2004)

Heart's Content is an album by jazz guitarist Peter Bernstein.

== Background ==
Bernstein and pianist Brad Mehldau had recorded together several times previously.

== Music and recording ==
The album was recorded on December 14, 2002 in Brooklyn, New York. The other musicians chosen were bassist Larry Grenadier and drummer Bill Stewart.

== Reception ==
The Penguin Guide to Jazz stated that the album is "almost sublime – unfussy, skilful, complex in tone". BBC Music Magazine commented that Bernstein's "fundamentally patient manner draws the listener in, in the conversational way of great post-bop music".

Professional ratings
Review scores
Source	Rating
The Penguin Guide to Jazz	4/4 stars

== Track listing ==
All tracks are written by Peter Bernstein except where noted.

No.	Title	Length
1.	"Little Green Men"	7:42
2.	"Heart's Content"	7:09
3.	"Relativity"	8:41
4.	"Constant Conversation"	8:12
5.	"Dedicated to You" (Sammy Cahn, Charlie Chaplin)	7:12
6.	"Simple as That"	8:32
7.	"Public Domain"	6:59
8.	"Blood Count" (Billy Strayhorn)	2:50

== Personnel ==
- Peter Bernstein – guitar
- Brad Mehldau – piano
- Larry Grenadier – bass
- Bill Stewart – drums
