= Second Sight (Marc Johnson album) =

Studio album by Marc Johnson's Bass Desires
- Released: 1987
- Recorded: March 1987
- Studio: Rainbow Studio; Oslo, Norway
- Genre: Jazz
- Length: 51:23
- Label: ECM 1351
- Producer: Manfred Eicher

Marc Johnson chronology
Bass Desires (1985)	Second Sight (1987)	Two by Four (1989)

Second Sight is a studio album by Marc Johnson's Bass Desires, recorded in March 1987 and released on ECM later that year. Johnson's Bass Desires quartet features guitarists Bill Frisell and John Scofield, and former Weather Report drummer Peter Erskine.

== Reception ==
Professional ratings
Review scores
Source	Rating
AllMusic	4/5 stars
The Penguin Guide to Jazz on CD	2.5/5 stars
The Virgin Encyclopedia of Jazz	3/5 stars

The AllMusic review by Scott Yanow stated: "This advanced unit performs eight group originals that cover a wide variety of moods, from introspective, spacy pieces to ones emphasizing fire and passion".

== Track listing ==
All compositions by Marc Johnson except as indicated

1. "Crossing the Corpus Callosum" – 8:30
2. "Small Hands" (Bill Frisell) – 6:44
3. "Sweet Soul" (Peter Erskine) – 7:31
4. "Twister" (John Scofield) – 4:57
5. "Thrill Seekers" (Scofield) – 8:38
6. "Prayer Beads" – 3:57
7. "1951" (Frisell) – 5:07
8. "Hymn for Her" – 6:38

== Personnel ==
=== Marc Johnson's Bass Desires ===
- Bill Frisell – guitar
- John Scofield – guitar
- Marc Johnson – bass
- Peter Erskine – drums
