= Avi Bortnick =

American jazz guitarist

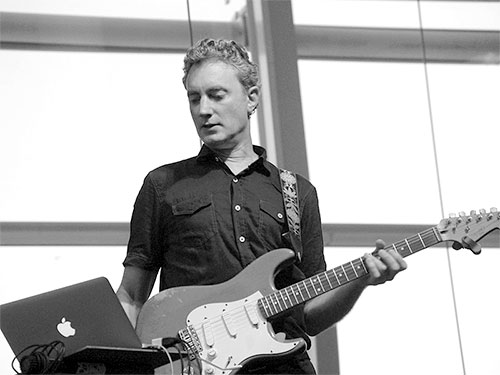
Avi Bortnick in 2014

Avi Bortnick is an American guitarist who became more widely known after his association with jazz guitarist John Scofield. Bortnick joined Scofield's jam-oriented band in 2000 and played rhythm guitar and samples on three albums: Überjam, Up All Night, and Überjam Deux.

== Biography ==
Born in Israel, Bortnick was raised in St. Louis, Missouri, where he was immersed in the sounds of funk, rock, and soul. After moving to California, he began to play with African and Caribbean bands. As a graduate student at the University of Florida in Gainesville, he started the band What It Is, which became popular in the southeast touring circuit.

Bortnick became known as a strong rhythm guitar player and came to John Scofield's attention when assembling a band for his album Bump. A five-month tour extended to four-and-a-half years. In 2003, Bortnick released his first solo album, Clean Slate.

Bortnick has played with the Avi B Three, Shitty Shitty Jam Band (with members of The Brazilian Girls), Rene Lopez, Jihae, Erik Deutsch, and Betty Black and the Ghost Train Orchestra.

== Discography ==
=== As sideman ===
With Jihae

- Elvis Is Still Alive (Septem, 2008)
- Fire Burning Rain (Septem, 2010)
- Illusion of You (Septem, 2015)

With John Scofield

- Uberjam (Verve, 2002)
- Up All Night (Verve, 2003)
- Uberjam Deux (Verve, 2013)

With others

- Ghost Train Orchestra, Book of Rhapsodies (Accurate, 2013)
- Ghost Train Orchestra, Book of Rhapsodies Vol. II (Accurate, 2017)
- Rene Lopez, Let's Be Strangers Again (Liberation, 2013)
