= Solar (John Abercrombie & John Scofield album) =

Studio album by John Abercrombie & John Scofield
- Released: 1984
- Recorded: May 1982, December 1983
- Studio: Music Annex Recording Studios (Menlo Park, California); Classic Sound Studios (New York City, New York)
- Genre: Jazz
- Length: 42:35
- Label: Palo Alto
- Producer: Orrin Keepnews John Abercrombie John Scofield

John Abercrombie chronology
Five Years Later (1982)	Solar (1984)	Night (1984)

John Scofield chronology
Electric Outlet (1984)	Solar (1984)	Still Warm (1986)

Professional ratings
Review scores
Source	Rating
Allmusic	4/5 stars

Solar is a studio album by jazz guitarists John Abercrombie and John Scofield. It was initially released in 1984 by Palo Alto Records and reissued in 2001 by West Wind Records.

== Reception ==
Ken Dryden of Allmusic stated "Guitarists John Abercrombie and John Scofield join forces for these early-'80s sessions, mostly duets while occasionally adding bassist George Mraz and drummer Peter Donald. They delve into the jazz canon with an intricate duet of 'Solar', a driving, Latin-fused take of 'Four on Six' (in which Abercrombie overdubs an electric mandolin), and a dreamy duo interpretation of 'If You Could See Me Now.' The sole standard, 'I Should Care', fares just as well in their hands, which settles into a relaxed exchange between the two players as if they are playing for themselves alone. Scofield's 'Small Wonder' is scored for the quartet, a bristling post-bop vehicle with a feature for Mraz as well. Abercrombie's introspective 'Sing Song' best contrasts the styles of the two leaders, with the composer a bit more melodic and Scofield with a more brittle attack. This is an enjoyable CD that has stood the test of time very well."

== Track listing ==
No.	Title	Writer(s)	Length
1.	"Solar"	Miles Davis	4:10
2.	"Even Steven"	Abercrombie	6:51
3.	"Four on Six"	Wes Montgomery	6:25
4.	"Sing Song"	Abercrombie	6:22
5.	"Small Wonder"	John Scofield	6:21
6.	"I Should Care"	Sammy Cahn, Axel Stordahl, Paul Weston	6:39
7.	"If You Could See Me Now"	Tadd Dameron, Carl Sigman	6:02
Total length:			42:35

== Personnel ==
- John Abercrombie – guitars, electric mandolin (3, 5)
- John Scofield – guitars
- George Mraz – bass (3, 5, 7)
- Peter Donald – drums (3, 5, 7)

Production

- Orrin Keepnews – producer, liner notes
- John Abercrombie – co-producer, liner notes
- John Scofield – co-producer, liner notes
- Fred Catero – engineer (1, 3, 5–7)
- Mike McDonald – engineer (2, 4)
- Roger Wiersema – assistant engineer (1, 3, 5–7)
- George Horn – mastering at Fantasy Studios (Berkeley, California)
- Herb Wong – art direction
- Chuck Walker – design
- Lee Townsend – back cover photography
- David Cavagnaro – cover photography
