= Stranger in Paradise (Peter Bernstein album) =

Studio album by Peter Bernstein
- Released: 2004
- Recorded: August 24–25, 2003
- Studio: Avatar (New York, New York)
- Genre: Jazz
- Label: Venus
- Producer: Tetsuo Hara, Todd Barkan

Peter Bernstein chronology
Heart's Content (2002)	Stranger in Paradise (2004)	Monk (2009)

Stranger in Paradise is an album by jazz guitarist Peter Bernstein.

== Background ==
Bernstein and pianist Brad Mehldau had recorded together several times previously, and bassist Larry Grenadier and drummer Bill Stewart had played with the guitarist on his Heart's Content album.

== Music and recording ==
Three of the tracks are Bernstein originals. The album contains "elements of hard bop and post-bop, including an intriguing, slightly off-center approach to 'Stranger in Paradise' and an intricate, moving interpretation of 'This Is Always'". Also covered are "a greasy arranging of Babs Gonzales' 'Soul Stirrin' ' and a breezy take of 'That Sunday, That Summer'".

== Reception ==
The Penguin Guide to Jazz commented that this and Bernstein's previous album, Heart's Content, "work at every level".

Professional ratings
Review scores
Source	Rating
AllMusic	4.5/5 stars
The Penguin Guide to Jazz	3.5/4 stars

== Track listing ==
1. "Venus Blues" (Bernstein)
2. "Stranger in Paradise" (Alexander Borodin, George Forrest, Robert Wright)
3. "Luiza" (Antônio Carlos Jobim)
4. "How Little We Know" (Springer)
5. "Bobblehead" (Bernstein)
6. "Just a Thought" (Bernstein)
7. "This Is Always" (Harry Warren)
8. "Soul Stirrin'" (Babs Gonzales)
9. "That Sunday, That Summer" (Joe Sherman, George David Weiss)
10. "Autumn Nocturne" (Josef Myrow)

== Personnel ==
- Peter Bernstein – guitar
- Brad Mehldau – piano
- Larry Grenadier – bass
- Bill Stewart – drums
