= Swallow Tales (John Scofield album) =

Studio album by John Scofield
- Released: June 12, 2020
- Recorded: March 2019
- Studio: James L. Dolan Recording Studio; NYU Steinhardt
- Genre: Jazz
- Length: 53:16
- Label: ECM 2679
- Producer: Manfred Eicher

John Scofield chronology
Combo 66 (2018)	Swallow Tales (2020)	John Scofield (2022)

Professional ratings
Review scores
Source	Rating
All About Jazz	4/5 stars
AllMusic	4.5/5 stars
The Arts Desk	5/5 stars
DownBeat	4/5 stars
Financial Times	4/5 stars
Jazz Journal	3.5/5 stars
Jazzwise	4/5 stars
PopMatters	7/10
RTE.ie	3.5/5 stars
The Times	4/5 stars

Swallow Tales is a studio album by jazz guitarist John Scofield recorded in March 2019 and released on ECM June the following year. The trio features rhythm section Steve Swallow and Bill Stewart. Swallow Tales refers to the trio's bassist, who composed the nine tracks, re-arranged for the recording.

== Reception ==
Chris Pearson in his review for The Times wrote, "This set, taped in half a day by a trio led by the American guitarist John Scofield, centres on that legacy to set the record straight."

A review by RTE.ie stated, "In sum, a collection of sensitive, knowing interpretations of the Swallow classics which you should let play continuously until the inevitable result - you will need its sound in your life for a while, weaving in and out of your rooms."

Matt Collar of AllMusic added, "The album arrives on the heels of several other Scofield small group sessions, including 2017's Hudson and 2018's Combo 66... It's a sound whose earthy lilt sometimes has the feel of a three-member vocal group, rather than an instrumental trio."

Will Layman of PopMatters commented, "The jazz guitar trio is a classic format, and John Scofield, Steve Swallow, and Bill Stewart are as well-equipped as many musicians could be to venerate it and renew it a bit. That is the accomplishment of Swallow Tales."

Michael Ullman in his review for The Arts Fuse noted, "This is an intelligent, inventively performed, be-boppish tribute to a composer I now know better than ever."

== Track listing ==
All tracks are written by Steve Swallow.

No.	Title	Length
1.	"She Was Young"	9:33
2.	"Falling Grace"	5:27
3.	"Portsmouth Figurations"	3:31
4.	"Awful Coffee"	9:28
5.	"Eiderdown"	7:13
6.	"Hullo Bolinas"	4:15
7.	"Away"	4:54
8.	"In F"	4:34
9.	"Radio"	4:21
Total length:		53:16

== Personnel ==
- John Scofield – guitars
- Steve Swallow – bass
- Bill Stewart – drums

=== Production ===
- Tyler McDiarmid – engineer
- Sascha Kleis – design
- Mark Franosch – cover photography
- Roberto Cifarelli – liner photography
- John Scofield – liner notes

== Charts ==
Chart performance for Swallow Tales
Chart (2020)	Peak position
German Albums (Offizielle Top 100)	96
Swiss Albums (Schweizer Hitparade)	56
