= Two by Four =

Studio album by Marc Johnson
- Released: 1989
- Recorded: April 17–18, 1989
- Studios: Clinton Recording Studio, New York.
- Genre: Post-Bop Jazz
- Length: 53:01
- Label: Verve/EmArcy (January 19, 1991) 842 233-2
- Producer: Kiyoshi "Boxman" Koyama

Marc Johnson chronology
Second Sight (1987)	Two by Four (1989)	Right Brain Patrol (1991)

Two by Four, released in 1989 by the EmArcy label, is a collection of duets by jazz acoustic bassist Marc Johnson. His duet partners include vibraphonist Gary Burton and harmonica virtuoso Toots Thielemans.

Professional ratings
Review scores
Source	Rating
Allmusic	4.5/5 stars
Penguin Guide to Jazz	3/4 stars
The Virgin Encyclopedia of Jazz	3/5 stars

== Review ==
This album is a series of duets led by Marc Johnson, who served with distinction as the bassist in Bill Evans' last trio. Here Two By Four Harmonica player extraordinaire Toots Thielemans joins Johnson for a beautifully strutting take of "Killer Joe," afollowed by an amazingly soft and subtle take of "Spartacus Love Theme" by Alex North, a favorite of Evans that Johnson never got the opportunity to play with him. Two By Four song «Goodbye Porkpie Hat» is done with a very effectfull slow arrangement. Vibraphonist Gary Burton also appears on three tracks, opened by «Monk's Dream», and with a dreamy take of the melancholy «Gary's Theme» and gorgeous version of Evans' «Time Remembered». Pianist Makoto Ozone also appears on three duets, proving to be suitable choice as well, giving an inspired version of Johnsons rather challenging «Miss Teri», Ozone is also up to the rapid-fire, uptempo post-bop «One Finger Snap» by Herbie Hancock. Singer Lucy Crane is the widow of Fred Crane, an early teacher and mentor of Johnson, and probably not familiar to the jazz audience, as this was the major label debut. She provides spirited vocals on both «Beautyful Love» and «Ain't Misbehaven'». Two By Four was one of the best album releases in 1989.

== Reception ==
The Allmusic review by Ken Dryden awarded the album 4½ stars stating "This series of duets featuring bassist Marc Johnson with different guests could be considered a tribute to Bill Evans, because it includes such a number of songs associated with the late pianist (though only one is an Evans composition)".

== Track listing ==
1. Killer Joe (4:40) (B. Golson)
2. Spartacus – Love Theme (3:40) (A. North)
3. Dinner For One Please, James (6:40) (M. Carr)
4. One Finger Snap (4:17) (H. Hancock)
5. Miss Teri (5:58) (M. Johnson)
6. Monk's Dream (3:51) (T. Monk)
7. Gary's Theme (6:39) (G. McFarland)
8. Beautyful Love (3:16) (H. Gillespie/V. Young/W. King/E.V. Alstyne)
9. Ain't Misbehaven' (2:57) (F. Waller/Harry Brooks)
10. Time Remembered (5:24) (B. Evans)
11. Goodbye Pork Pie Hat (5:05) (C. Mingus)

== Personnel ==
- Marc Johnson – bass
- Toots Thielemans – harmonica (tracks: 1, 2 & 11)
- Makoto Ozone – piano (tracks: 3, 4 & 5)
- Gary Burton – vibraphone (tracks: 6, 7 & 10)
- Lucy Crane – vocals (tracks: 8 & 9)

== Notes ==
- April 17 & 18, 1989 at Cinton Recording Studio, New York
