= East Meets West (John Scofield album) =

Studio album by John Scofield
- Released: 1978
- Recorded: August 12–18, 1977
- Studio: Onkio Haus, Tokyo, Japan
- Genre: Jazz, jazz fusion
- Length: 38:17
- Label: Trio
- Producer: Ken Inaoka, Kazuo Harada

John Scofield chronology
East Meets West (1978)	John Scofield Live (1978)

Professional ratings
Review scores
Source	Rating
Allmusic	4/5 stars

East Meets West is the debut album by American jazz guitarist John Scofield. It was recorded in 1977 at the Onkio Haus in Tokyo with bassist Clint Houston and Motohiko Hino on drums. The opening tracks of either side of the LP include trumpeter Terumasa Hino, the drummer's brother.

The album was released under the title John Scofield in 1978 by Trio Records in Japan. After Trio closed, BlackHawk Records released the album in 1987 under the title East Meets West. Storyville Records reissued the album with part of the original design restored, using a cropped photograph of Scofield standing by the Hudson River.

Scofield had his major breakthrough playing with Miles Davis by the time of the Black Hawk re-release. According to Herb Wong in the liner notes, Scofield was the first guitarist to transfer "post-Coltrane harmonic language, integrating much of the idiom saxophonists have been working on."

== Terumasa Hino and John Scofield ==
Terumasa Hino and John Scofield played several times together, especially in 1977. On August 10 and 11, on the eve of this recording session, all four musicians had already recorded the tracks for Hino's Hip Seagull at Victor Studios in Tokyo as part of a greater ensemble. The more fusion-oriented album was finished later that year in New York, where Terumasa Hino and John Scofield had a recording date in May 1977, together with Ron Carter and Tony Williams for Hino's album May Dance. Both albums were released on Flying Disk. Scofield and Hino were also part of the Dave Liebman Quintet around 1980 and recorded together again in the 1990s for Hino's album Bluestruck for Blue Note (1990) and his Led Zeppelin tribute album It's There (Enja, 1995).

== Track listing ==
All tracks are written by John Scofield except where noted.

No.	Title	Writer(s)	Length
1.	"Public Domain"		8:17
2.	"Amy (Who Else?)"		3:22
3.	"Blues for Okinawa"		6:32
4.	"V"		9:48
5.	"Un Toco Loco – Ballet"	Motohiko Hino, Michael Gibbs	5:14
6.	"Ida Lupino"	Carla Bley	4:44

== Personnel ==
- John Scofield – guitar
- Terumasa Hino – trumpet
- Clint Houston – double bass, bass guitar
- Motohiko Hino – drums
