= Country for Old Men =

Studio album by John Scofield
- Released: September 23, 2016
- Recorded: April 3–4, 2016
- Studio: Carriage House Studios (Stamford, Connecticut)
- Genre: Jazz
- Length: 1:02:26
- Label: Impulse!
- Producer: John Scofield

John Scofield chronology
Past Present (2015)	Country for Old Men (2016)	Hudson (2017)

Professional ratings
Review scores
Source	Rating
All About Jazz	4.5/5 stars
The Guardian	3/5 stars
PopMatters	7/10
Tom Hull	B+

Country for Old Men is an album by American jazz guitarist John Scofield. It earned Scofield a Grammy Award for Best Jazz Instrumental Album. It features longtime Scofield collaborators Larry Goldings on piano & organ, bass guitarist Steve Swallow and drummer Bill Stewart. Impulse! released the album on September 23, 2016.

== Background ==
The album features jazz versions of country music songs. The album was recorded on April 3 and 4, 2016 in the Carriage House Studios in Stamford, Connecticut.

The title originates from the first line of the 1927 poem "Sailing to Byzantium" by W.B. Yeats ("That is no country for old men"), and was used as the title of the novel No Country for Old Men (2005) by Cormac McCarthy which was adapted into a 2007 film. The title is also a joke about Scofield's age: he was 64 when the album was recorded; his longtime bassist Steve Swallow was 76.

== Reception ==
Evan Haga of JazzTimes stated, "John Scofield’s latest project, a set of C&W standards, is full of surprises even if its concept might seem overdue for the guitarist, whose abiding love of American roots music is no secret. Rather than bend toward the idiom he’s exploring, as he did on the fruitful gospel exercise Piety Street, from 2009, here Scofield often pulls his chosen country classics into small-group postbop." John Kelman of All About Jazz wrote, "The music is always what matters most, of course; but when it's possible to marry stellar playing with superb sound, the result is something as glorious for the ears as it is the head, the heart and the soul...all of which Country for Old Men possesses, in spades. And, beyond the lyrical, country-tinged ballads and fiery swingers, Country for Old Men saves its biggest surprises for its final minutes..." John Fordham of The Guardian added, "Occasionally there’s a disconnect between the convivial lilt of some of these tunes and the jazz grooves, but Scofield at full jazz-improv pelt is always something to behold."

== Track listing ==
No.	Title	Writer(s)	Length
1.	"Mr. Fool"	Darrell Edwards, George Jones, Herbie Treece	5:05
2.	"I'm So Lonesome I Could Cry"	Hank Williams	7:02
3.	"Bartenders Blues"	James Taylor	5:18
4.	"Wildwood Flower"	Joseph Philbrick Webster	3:54
5.	"Wayfaring Stranger"	Traditional	6:31
6.	"Mama Tried"	Merle Haggard	5:19
7.	"Jolene"	Dolly Parton	7:36
8.	"Faded Love"	Bob Wills, John Lee Wills, Billy Jack Wills	6:33
9.	"Just a Girl I Used to Know"	Jack Clement	4:10
10.	"Red River Valley"	Traditional	6:17
11.	"You're Still the One"	Shania Twain, John Robert Lange	4:21
12.	"I'm an Old Cowhand"	Johnny Mercer	0:31
Total length:			1:02:26

== Personnel ==
- John Scofield – guitars, ukulele (12)
- Larry Goldings – acoustic piano (1, 5, 6), Hammond organ (2-4, 7-11)
- Steve Swallow – bass guitar
- Bill Stewart – drums

=== Production ===
- Farida Bachir – executive director, art direction
- John Scofield – producer
- Jay Newland – recording, mixing
- Mikhail Pivovarov – assistant engineer
- Mark Wilder – mastering at Battery Studios (New York, NY)
- Brian Bacchus – A&R
- Susan Scofield – art direction
- Françoise Bergmann – design
- Nicholas Suttle – cover and liner photography
- John Abbott – additional liner photography
- Phil Madeira – liner notes
