= Überjam =

Studio album by John Scofield
- Released: January 29, 2002
- Recorded: July 30 – August 1, 29 & 30, and September 6, 2001
- Studios: Avatar, New York City
- Genre: Jazz
- Length: 58:43
- Label: Verve
- Producers: !John Scofield; Jason Olaine

John Scofield chronology
| Works for Me (2001) | Überjam (2002) | Up All Night (2003) |

Professional ratings
Review scores
| Source | Rating |
|---|---|
| Allmusic | 4/5 stars |
| All About Jazz | (favourable) |
| The Penguin Guide to Jazz Recordings | 2/4 stars |

Überjam is an album by jazz guitarist John Scofield, the first credited to “The John Scofield Band”. It was released by Verve on January 29, 2002. Saxophonist Karl Denson, guitarist Avi Bortnick, keyboardist John Medeski and drummer Adam Deitch are among the players.

== Track listing ==
All tracks are written by John Scofield except where noted.

| No. | Title | Writer(s) | Length |
|---|---|---|---|
| 1. | "Acidhead" | Scofield, Bortnick, Murphy | 6:33 |
| 2. | "Ideofunk" | | 4:44 |
| 3. | "Jungle Fiction" | | 5:39 |
| 4. | "I Brake 4 Monster Booty" | Scofield, Bortnick, Murphy, Deitch | 4:02 |
| 5. | "Animal Farm" | | 5:36 |
| 6. | "Offspring" | | 6:27 |
| 7. | "Tomorrow Land" | Bortnick | 3:58 |
| 8. | "Überjam" | Scofield, Bortnick, Murphy, Browden, Rodgers & Hart | 6:53 |
| 9. | "Polo Towers" | | 5:29 |
| 10. | "Snap Crackle Pop" | | 6:02 |
| 11. | "Lucky for Her" | Scofield, Bortnick, Murphy | 3:12 |

== Personnel ==
- John Scofield – electric guitar
- John Medeski – Hammond B3 organ (1, 2, 5, 9), clavinet (1, 5), Mellotron (1, 9)
- Avi Bortnick – rhythm guitar (1, 3, 4, 7–11), sampler (1, 3–6, 8–11), acoustic guitar (2, 5, 6)
- Jesse Murphy – bass guitar
- Adam Deitch – drums, rap (4), percussion (7)
- Karl Denson – flute (2), saxophone (9)
  - All arrangements by the John Scofield Band.

=== Production ===
- Susan Scofield – executive producer
- Jason Olaine – producer
- John Scofield – producer
- Joe Ferla – recording, mixing
- Kevin Killen – additional recording
- Ross Peterson – assistant engineer
- Stephanie Faraci – recording coordinator
- Evelyn Morgan – recording coordinator
- Greg Calbi – mastering at Sterling Sound (New York, NY)
- Kelly Pratt – release coordinator
- Stuart Pressman – release coordinator
- Hollis King – art direction
- Lenny Hickey – design
- Hessdesignworks.com – illustration
