= Bill Stewart (musician) =

American jazz drummer (born 1966)

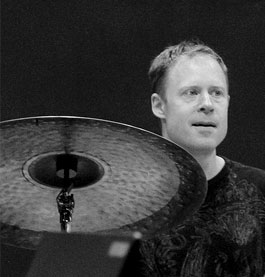
- Denmark 2011

Background information
- Born: William Harris Stewart; October 18, 1966 (age 59); Des Moines, Iowa, U.S.
- Genre: Jazz
- Occupations: Musician, composer
- Instrument: Drums
- Label: Blue Note

William Harris Stewart (born October 18, 1966, in Des Moines, Iowa) is an American jazz drummer.

== Biography ==
Bill Stewart's father was a trombonist, and his first and middle names are a tribute to jazz trombonist Bill Harris.

Stewart grew up in Des Moines, Iowa, listening to his parents' jazz and rhythm and blues records without much exposure to live jazz in the then relatively isolated state of Iowa. The largely self-taught drummer began playing at the age of seven. While in high school, he played in a Top 40 cover band and the school orchestra, and went to a summer music camp at Stanford Jazz Workshop, where he met Dizzy Gillespie. After high school graduation, Stewart attended the University of Northern Iowa in Cedar Falls, Iowa, playing in the jazz and marching bands as well as the orchestra. He then transferred to William Paterson University (then William Paterson College), where he played in ensembles directed by Rufus Reid, studied drums with Eliot Zigmund and Horacee Arnold and took composition lessons from Dave Samuels. Stewart met future employer Joe Lovano while still in college (the two played duets in lieu of a drum lesson when Zigmund was away). Stewart also made his first recordings, with saxophonist Scott Kreitzer, and pianist Armen Donelian, while still in school, and with pianist Franck Amsallem (and Gary Peacock on bass) shortly thereafter, in 1990.

After college, Stewart moved to New York, gaining wider recognition in John Scofield's quartet with pianist Michael Eckroth and bassist Ben Street and in a trio with Larry Goldings and Peter Bernstein, which has become the longest-running group Stewart has played with, having begun in 1989 and continuing to this day, performing infrequently. Stewart's musical horizons expanded when funk saxophonist Maceo Parker noticed Stewart upon seeing him with Larry Goldings at a regular gig at a club in Manhattan. Stewart worked with Parker from 1990 to 1991, touring and recording on three of Parker's albums. The association led to Stewart's gig with James Brown, who told Stewart that there "Ain't no funk in Iowa!" upon learning the drummer's roots. Another close associate is pianist Kevin Hays, with whom he performs, along with fellow WPC graduate, bassist Doug Weiss. The Kevin Hays trio has recorded five CDs and toured internationally. Musical associations with Lee Konitz, Michael Brecker, Pat Metheny and many other jazz musicians have followed.

Stewart is openly gay.

== Technique ==
Stewart, unlike the majority of jazz drummers, plays using matched grip.

== Gear ==
Stewart plays various Zildjian K cymbals and is endorsed by the Avedis Zildjian Company. A collaboration with Paul Francis from Zildjian yielded the 22" K Custom Special Dry Complex Rides (in Thin and Medium Thin weights), which are meant to replicate the sound of an old K Zildjian cymbal Stewart has had for a long time. They were introduced in 2004. According to Stewart, "The K Custom Special Dry Complex Ride has some trashy quality, but can also be articulate. The nice crash sound gets out of the way quickly while a clean stick sound or click is evident when riding. These cymbals are very pretty, yet can be very nasty."

The cymbals were redesigned and sold as the K Custom Dry Complex II Rides since 2008 in sizes of 20, 22 and 24-inch. These custom ride cymbals feature a wider bell with a much lower profile to promote more control while offering a smooth array of rich overtones. Weight specifications are slightly heavier (medium-thin) than the first generation of Complex Rides, to make the cymbals more versatile, providing ride patterns that can be heard clearly from within an airy wash of overtones.

Zildjian has also designed the Bill Stewart Artist Series Drumsticks.

== Discography ==
=== As leader ===
- Think Before You Think (Jazz City, 1990)
- Snide Remarks (Blue Note, 1995)
- Telepathy (Blue Note, 1997)
- Catability (Enja, 1998)
- Drum Crazy (Funky Kitchen, 2005)
- Keynote Speakers (2005)
- Incandescence (Pirouet, 2008)
- Live at Smalls (Smallslive, 2011)
- Ramshackle Serenade (Pirouet, 2014)
- Space Squid (Pirouet, 2015)
- Band Menu (Stewed Music, 2018)

Collaborations
With Peter Bernstein and Larry Goldings

- Earth Tones (Criss Cross Jazz, 1998)
- Ramshackle Serenade (Pirouet, 2014)

=== As a member ===
A Band in All Hope
With Bill Carrothers and Anton Denner

- Ye Who Enter Here (Bridge Boy Music, 1993)

=== As sideman ===
With Franck Amsallem

- Out a Day (OMD, 1992) – rec. 1990
- Another Time (Challenge/A-, 1998) – rec. 1990

With Peter Bernstein

- 2004Stranger in Paradise (Venus) – rec. 2003
- 2004 Heart's Content (Criss Cross Jazz)
- 2016 Let Loose (Smoke Sessions)

With Seamus Blake

- 1994 The Call (Criss Cross Jazz) – rec. 1993
- 2007 Way Out Willy (Criss Cross Jazz) – rec. 2006
- 2009 Bellwether (Criss Cross Jazz) – rec. 2008
- 2010 Live at Smalls – live rec. 2009

With Bill Carrothers

- 2002 Duets with Bill Stewart (Dreyfus) – rec. 1999
- 2003 Ghost Ships (Sketch) – rec. 2002
- 2008 Home Row (Pirouet) – rec. 1992
- 2010 Joy Spring (Pirouet) – rec. 2009

With Scott Colley

- 1998 Subliminal... (Criss Cross Jazz)
- 2000 The Magic Line (Arabesque Jazz)
- 2002 Initial Wisdom (Palmetto)

With Marc Copland

- 1998 Softly... (Savoy Jazz)
- 2006 New York Trio Recordings Vol. 1: Modinha (Pirouet)
- 2009 New York Trio Recordings Vol. 3: Night Whispers (Pirouet)

With Armen Donelian

- Secrets (Sunnyside, 1988)
- The Wayfarer (Sunnyside, 1990) – rec. 1989

With Larry Goldings

- 1991 The Intimacy of the Blues (Verve)
- 1992 Light Blue (Minor Music)
- 1994 Caminhos Cruzados (Novus/RCA) – rec. 1993
- 1995 Whatever It Takes (Warner Bros.)
- 1996 Big Stuff (Warner Bros.)
- 2001 As One (Palmetto) – rec. 2000
- 2002 Sweet Science (Palmetto)
- 2018 Toy Tunes (Pirouet) – rec. 2016

With Jon Gordon

- 1992 The Jon Gordon Quartet (Chiaroscuro)
- 1998 Currents (Double-Time)
- 2000 Possibilities (Double-Time)

With Wycliffe Gordon

- United Soul Experience (Criss Cross Jazz, 2002)
- Dig This!! (Criss Cross Jazz, 2003)

With Lage Lund

- 2010 Unlikely Stories (Criss Cross Jazz)
- 2013 Foolhardy (Criss Cross Jazz)
- 2015 Idlewild (Criss Cross Jazz)

With Pat Martino

- Nightwings (Muse, 1996) – rec. 1994
- Mission Accomplished (32 Jazz, 1999)[2CD]

With Pat Metheny

- 1994 I Can See Your House from Here (Blue Note) – rec. 1993
- 1994 Summertime (The Flying Tigers)[2CD]
- 2000 Trio 99 → 00 (Warner Bros.) – rec. 1999
- 2000 Trio → Live (Warner Bros.) – rec. 1999–2000

With Maceo Parker

- 1990 Roots Revisited (Minor Music)
- 1991 Mo' Roots (Verve)
- 1993 Southern Exposure (Novus)
- 1995 The Bremen Concert (Minor Music) – live rec. 1990

With Dave Pietro

- Forgotten Dreams (A-, 1996)
- Wind Dance (A-, 1998)

With Chris Potter

- 1994 Concentric Circles (Concord) – rec.1993
- 2002 Traveling Mercies (Verve)
- 2004 Lift: Live at the Village Vanguard (Sunnyside) – live rec. 2002

With Jim Rotondi

- 2004 New Vistas (Criss Cross Jazz)
- 2006 Iron Man (Criss Cross Jazz)
- 2010 1000 Rainbows (Posi-Tone)

With John Scofield

- 1991 Meant to Be (Blue Note) – rec. 1990
- 1993 What We Do (Blue Note) – rec. 1992
- 1994 Hand Jive (Blue Note) – rec. 1993
- 1994 I Can See Your House from Here (Blue Note) – rec. 1993
- 1994 Summertime (The Flying Tigers)[2CD]
- 1996 Quiet (Verve)
- 2000 Steady Groovin' (Blue Note) – rec. 1989–1995
- 2004 EnRoute (Blue Note) – rec. 2003
- 2007 This Meets That (Universal) – rec. 2006–2007
- 2015 Past Present (Impulse!)
- 2016 Country for Old Men (Impulse!)
- 2018 Combo 66 (Verve)
- 2020 Swallow Tales (ECM) – rec. 2019
- 2023 Uncle John's Band (ECM) – rec. 2022

With Jesse van Ruller

- Circles (Criss Cross Jazz, 2003) – rec. 2002
- Views (Criss Cross Jazz, 2006) – rec. 2005

With Fred Wesley

- New Friends (Minor Music, 1990)
- Comme Ci Comme Ca (Antilles, 1991)

With Chihiro Yamanaka

- 2010 Forever Begins (Verve)
- 2011 Reminiscence (Verve)
- 2013 Running Wild (Verve)

With others

- 1990 Ron McClure, Never Forget (SteepleChase)
- 1990 Joe Lovano, Landmarks (Blue Note)
- 1991 Lee Konitz, Zounds (Soul Note) – rec. 1990
- 1991 Kevin Hays, El Matador (Jazz City) – rec. 1990
- 1992 Don Grolnick, Nighttown (Blue Note)
- 1993 Franck Amsallem Regards (Free Lance)
- 1994 Tim Hagans, No Words (Blue Note) – rec. 1993
- 1995 Walt Weiskopf, World Away (Criss Cross Jazz) – rec. 1993
- 1996 George Garzone, Four's and Two's (NYC)
- 1996 Hank Marr, Groovin It! (Double Time)
- 1996 Marty Ehrlich, New York Child (Enja)
- 1996 Bob Belden, Shades of Blue (Blue Note) – 2 tracks in omnibus
- 1997 Bill Charlap, Distant Star (Criss Cross Jazz) – rec. 1996
- 1997 Ingrid Jensen, Here on Earth (Enja) – rec. 1996
- 1998 John Patitucci, Now (Concord)
- 1998 Steve Kuhn, Love Walked In (Venus)
- 1999 Eddie Hinton, Hard Luck Guy (Capricorn)
- 1999 Michael Brecker, Time Is of the Essence (Verve)
- 2001 Curtis Stigers, Baby Plays Around (Concord Jazz)
- 2002 Nick Brignola, Tour de Force (Reservoir)
- 2003 Tommy Smith, Evolution (Spartacus)
- 2003 Martial Solal, NY-1, Live at the Village Vanguard (Blue Note) – live rec. 2001
- 2004 Jonathan Kreisberg, Nine Stories Wide (Criss Cross Jazz)
- 2004 Stan Sulzmann, The Jigsaw (Basho)
- 2005 George Colligan, Past-Present-Future (Criss Cross Jazz) – rec. 2003
- 2006 James Muller, Kaboom (Birdland)
- 2007 Adam Rogers, Time and the Infinite (Criss Cross Jazz)
- 2008 Kevin Hays, Live at Smalls (Smalls Live)
- 2009 Mark Soskin, Man Behind the Curtain (Kind of Blue)
- 2013 Dayna Stephens, I'll Take My Chances (Criss Cross Jazz)
- 2023 MTB, Solid Jackson (Criss Cross Jazz)
