= Who's Who? =

Studio album by John Scofield
- Released: 1979 (LP, US); 1990 (digitally remastered release); 1997 (US)
- Recorded: 1979
- Studios: The Platinum Factory, Brooklyn, New York
- Genres: Jazz, jazz fusion
- Labels: Arista/Novus; Novus/RCA/BMG Novus Series '70 (CD release); One Way (re-release)
- Producers: John Scofield, David Baker, Mark Bingham; Michael Cuscuna (1990)

John Scofield chronology
Rough House (1979)	Who's Who? (1979)	Four Keys (1979)

Professional ratings
Review scores
Source	Rating
Allmusic	2.5/5 stars

Who's Who? is a 1979 studio album by American jazz guitarist John Scofield. It features an acoustic band on two tracks (including Scofield's then-employer Dave Liebman on saxophones, bassist Eddie Gómez and drummer Billy Hart), and an electric group (keyboardist Kenny Kirkland, bass guitarist Anthony Jackson, percussionist Sammy Figueroa and drummer Steve Jordan) on the remaining four tracks. The bonus tracks added in 1990 were originally from the 1980 album Bar Talk (issued only in Japan), that had introduced the “John Scofield Trio” with bass guitarist Steve Swallow and drummer Adam Nussbaum.

== Track listing ==
All compositions written by John Scofield except where noted.

1. "Looks Like Meringue" – 6:44
2. "Cassidae" – 5:58
3. "The Beatles" – 4:56
4. "Spoons" – 5:08
5. "Who's Who?" – 6:19
6. "How the West Was Won" – 7:46

1990 CD bonus tracks taken from Bar Talk:

7. "Beckon Call" (Gary Campbell) – 7:00
8. "New Strings Attached" – 6:08
9. "How to Marry a Millionaire" – 6:34
10. "Fat Dancer" – 6:49

The bonus tracks were recorded at Celebration Studios, New York, in August 1980.

== Personnel ==
- John Scofield – electric guitar
- Kenny Kirkland – keyboards
- Anthony Jackson – bass guitar
- Steve Jordan – drums
- Sammy Figueroa – percussion
- Dave Liebman – saxophones (“The Beatles” & “How the West Was Won”)
- Eddie Gomez – acoustic bass viol (“The Beatles” & “How the West Was Won”)
- Billy Hart – drums (“The Beatles” & “How the West Was Won”)
- Steve Swallow – bass guitar (7–10, 1990 bonus tracks)
- Adam Nussbaum – drums (7–10, 1990 bonus tracks)
