= Up All Night (John Scofield album) =

Studio album by The John Scofield Band
- Released: May 20, 2003 (US) (CD)
- Recorded: December 2002–January 2003
- Studio: Long View Studios, Massachusetts, United States
- Genre: Jazz fusion, jazz funk
- Length: 67:08
- Label: Verve Records
- Producer: John Scofield, Avi Bortnick

The John Scofield Band chronology
Überjam (2002)	Up All Night (2003)	EnRoute: John Scofield Trio LIVE (2004)

Professional ratings
Review scores
Source	Rating
AllMusic	4/5 stars
All About Jazz	(very favorable)

Up All Night is a 2003 album by jazz guitarist John Scofield, his sixth album for the Verve label, and the second for “The John Scofield Band”. For this recording, the band included second guitarist and co-producer Avi Bortnick and drummer Adam Deitch, both of whom appeared on Überjam. The recording also features bass guitarist Andy Hess (who also played in Gov’t Mule). A four piece horn section, arranged by Scofield, appears on six of the eleven tracks. The Dramatics’ 1971 hit "Whatcha See Is Whatcha Get” is the only cover. Five of the tracks were co-written by Scofield and the band.

== Critical reception ==
On AllAboutJazz Farrell Lowe begins his review “The Freaky Deaky is back!,” referring to Scofield's time playing with Miles Davis, “this is the most inspired playing I have heard from John Scofield in many years.” “Scofield inhabits a place in which the cerebral and the funky ... form an alliance and work together for the common good,” Alex Henderson writes in his four-star-review on AllMusic, and concludes: “Up All Night is a consistently engaging addition to his sizable catalog.” Whereas on JazzTimes Nate Chinen writes in his critique, “Scofield and crew acquit themselves flawlessly to the material, but ... there are no real clunkers on the album (despite a cheeky "Watch Out for Po-Po," which comes close). ... What seems to be missing is the edgy sensibility of a band reaching beyond its limits. It should serve as a testament to Scofield that those borders have already been stretched to the extreme.”

== Track listing ==
All tracks arranged by John Scofield.

1. "Philiopiety" (John Scofield, Avi Bortnick, Adam Deitch, Yusef Lateef) – 6:23
2. "Watch Out for Po-Po" (Scofield, Bortnick, Deitch, Jesse Murphy) – 6:04
3. "Creeper" (Scofield) – 7:27
4. "Whatcha See Is Whatcha Get" (Tony Hester) – 5:53
5. "I'm Listening" (Scofield, Bortnick, Deitch, Murphy) – 2:58
6. "Thikhathali" (Scofield, Bortnick, Deitch, Murphy) – 6:58
7. "Four on the Floor" (Scofield) – 6:03
8. "Like the Moon" (Scofield) – 6:40
9. "Freakin' Disco" (Scofield, Bortnick, Deitch) – 8:21
10. "Born in Troubled Times" (Scofield) – 4:56
11. "Every Night Is Ladies Night" (Scofield) – 5:27

== Personnel ==
The John Scofield Band

- John Scofield – electric guitar, guitar samples
- Avi Bortnick – rhythm guitar, samples, loops
- Andy Hess – bass guitar
- Adam Deitch – drums

Horn section (tracks 1, 4, 6–8 & 11)

- John Scofield – arrangements
- Gary Smulyan – baritone saxophone
- Craig Handy – tenor saxophone, flute, bass clarinet
- Jim Pugh – trombone
- Earl Gardner – trumpet

Additional musicians

- Jeannie Scofield – sequencing
- Samson Olawale – percussion samples (6)

== Production ==
- The John Scofield Band – arrangements
- Susan Scofield – executive producer
- John Scofield – producer
- Avi Bortnick – producer
- Jason Olaine – producer
- Joe Ferla – producer, recording, mixing
- Jon Belec – assistant engineer
- Eric Carlinsky – assistant engineer
- Mike Lapierre – assistant engineer
- Claudius Mittendorfer – assistant engineer
- Patrick Murray – audience participation recording
- Camus Celli – percussion sampler recording
- Fran Flannery – Pro Tools operator
- Greg Calbi – mastering at Sterling Sound (New York, NY)
- Kelly Pratt – release coordinator
- Robert Silverberg – release coordinator
- Hollis King – art direction
- Bates Hori – design
- Mark Hess – illustration
- Jason Tanaka Blaney – photography
