= Rough House (album) =

Studio album by John Scofield
- Released: 1979
- Recorded: November 27, 1978
- Studio: Studio Zuckerfabrik, Stuttgart, Germany
- Genre: Jazz
- Length: 39:28
- Label: Enja Records
- Producer: Horst Weber, Matthias Winckelmann

John Scofield chronology
East Meets West (1977)	Rough House (1979)	Who's Who? (1979)

Professional ratings
Review scores
Source	Rating
Allmusic	2.5/5 stars
DownBeat	4.5/5 stars

Rough House is a studio album by jazz guitarist John Scofield. It features pianist Hal Galper, bassist Stafford James and drummer Adam Nussbaum (who would go on to play in Scofield’s trio).

== Track listing ==
All tracks are written by John Scofield except where noted.

No.	Title	Writer(s)	Length
1.	"Rough House"		9:14
2.	"Alster Fields"		5:23
3.	"Ailleron"		6:50
4.	"Slow Elvin"		6:10
5.	"Triple Play"	Hal Galper	8:26
6.	"Air Pakistan"		3:25

== Personnel ==
- John Scofield – guitar
- Hal Galper – piano
- Stafford James – bass
- Adam Nussbaum – drums
