= EnRoute: John Scofield Trio LIVE =

Live album by John Scofield Trio
- Released: May 11, 2004
- Recorded: December 2003
- Venue: Blue Note Jazz Club and Avatar Studios (New York City, New York)
- Genre: Jazz
- Length: 73:48
- Label: Verve
- Producer: John Scofield

John Scofield chronology
Up All Night (2003)	EnRoute: John Scofield Trio LIVE (2004)	That's What I Say: John Scofield Plays the Music of Ray Charles (2005)

Professional ratings
Review scores
Source	Rating
AllMusic	4/5 stars
All About Jazz	4.5/5 stars

EnRoute: John Scofield Trio LIVE is an album by the John Scofield Trio featuring bass guitarist Steve Swallow and drummer Bill Stewart that was recorded at the Blue Note Jazz Club in New York City in December 2003.

== Tracks ==
1. "Wee" (Denzil Best) – 8:24
2. "Toogs" (Scofield) – 7:26
3. "Name That Tune" (Swallow) – 6:30
4. "Hammock Soliloquy" (Scofield) – 9:50
5. "Bag" (Scofield) – 9:03
6. "It Is Written" (Scofield) – 6:39
7. "Alfie" (Burt Bacharach, Hal David) – 6:52
8. "Travel John" (Scofield) – 7:30
9. "Over Big Top" (Scofield) – 11:15

== Personnel ==
- John Scofield – guitars
- Steve Swallow – electric bass
- Bill Stewart – drums

Production

- Susan Scofield – executive producer
- John Scofield – producer
- David Baker – recording, mixing
- Katsuhiko Naito – recording, editing, mastering
- Ejji Takasuki – recording assistant
- Brian Montgomery – mix assistant
- John Newcott – release coordinator
- Kelly Pratt – release coordinator
- Hollis King – art direction
- Riki Ichiki – design, additional photography
- Josef Aster – photography
