= The Hampton Sisters =

American jazz musician

- Born: Middletown, Butler County, Ohio
- Origin: Indianapolis, Indiana, United States
- Genres: Jazz; swing
- Years active: 1920-2006
- Label: Savoy

The Hampton Sisters, an African-American quartet of jazz musicians was formed in Indianapolis, Indiana, during World War II. The group initially consisted of four siblings: Aletra Hampton (October 8, 1915 – November 13, 2007), Carmalita Hampton (died May 15, 1987), Virtue Hampton Whitted (February 22, 1922 – January 17, 2007), and Dawn Hampton (June 8, 1928 – September 25, 2016). Although the Middletown, Ohio, natives signed a recording contract in 1954, they were better known for their live performances as part of their family's jazz band during the 1940s and 1950s and as the Hampton Sisters. The Hampton family of four sisters and five brothers performed at New York City's Carnegie Hall and Harlem's Apollo Theater and the Savoy Ballroom. The group also toured the United States and performed as the house band at nightclubs in Indianapolis and Cincinnati, Ohio. Dawn Hampton left the group in 1958 to pursue a solo career as a New York City cabaret singer and, later, a swing dancer, while the other sisters formed a trio and continued to perform as the Hampton Sisters for several more years. Carmalita reunited with her sisters, Aletra and Virtue, in 1981, after a nearly twenty-year break. Following Carmalita's death in 1987, Aletra and Virtue performed as the Hampton Sisters duo, mostly in the Indianapolis area, until 2006.

The Hamptons were the recipients of several awards for their contributions to Indiana's musical heritage, including a Governor Arts Award (1991). Aletra Hampton and Virtue Hampton Whitted were inducted into the Indianapolis Jazz Foundation's Hall of Fame (1999); received honorary doctorate of music degrees from the University of Indianapolis (2004); and were the recipients of NUVO newspaper's Cultural Vision Lifetime Achievement Award (2006). New York's Private Lives magazine recognized Dawn Hampton's career as a vocalist with a Lifetime Achievement in Cabaret Award.

== Early life and family ==
The Hampton sisters were born in Middletown, Ohio, and included Aletra, the oldest of the Hampton family's twelve children, who was born on October 8, 1915; Carmalita; Virtue, born on February 22, 1922; and the youngest sister, Dawn, born on June 8, 1928.

Their parents were Laura (Burford), a native of Richmond, Virginia, and Clarke "Deacon" Hampton, a native of Batavia, Ohio. Hampton was born in 1877, studied music and art while attending a military academy in Xenia, Ohio, and worked as a carpenter and teacher. Burford married Hampton in 1908. Both of the Hampton sisters' parents played musical instruments. Clarke Hampton taught himself to play saxophone and drums; Laura Hampton played piano.

Although three of the twelve Hampton siblings died young, the sisters' five surviving brothers were Clarke Jr. "Duke," Marcus, Russell "Lucky," Maceo, and Locksley "Slide". The Hampton sisters had no formal musical training, but their parents taught each of the children to play at least one musical instrument. Aletra played piano, Carmalita was a baritone saxophonist, Virtue played the double bass, and Dawn played the alto saxophone. Under their father's leadership, all of the Hampton children began performing in the family band at a young age. In addition to playing instruments, the Hampton sisters became vocal performers. Carmalita specialized in Latin songs, Aletra specialized in jazz and blues music, and Dawn sang ballads.

Aletra Hampton married and had children, but the marriage ended in divorce after fourteen years. Her daughter, Paula Hampton, became a drummer-vocalist. Virtue Hampton married Thomas Whitted Sr., a drummer in the Duke Hampton Orchestra; however, the marriage of more than fifty years ended in divorce. Their son, Pharez Whitted, is a jazz trumpeter and music educator in Chicago, Illinois. Carmalita was the mother of two children, but Dawn Hampton remained single and had no children.

The sisters' youngest brother, "Slide" Hampton, a noted jazz trombonist, composer, and arranger, is a two-time Grammy Award winner and a recipient of a National Endowment for the Arts Jazz Masters Award (2005).

== Career ==
The Hampton sisters began performing at a young age as part of the Hampton family band. They also formed a quartet during World War II and performed with the Duke Hampton band, their oldest brother's jazz orchestra. When the band dissolved in the 1950s, Aletra, Carmalita, and Virtue Hampton established themselves as a trio and performed as the Hamptons Sisters for several more years. The trio reunited in 1981 after a nearly twenty-year hiatus. Their youngest sister, Dawn, pursued a solo career as an entertainer in New York City. After Carmalita's death in 1987, Aletra and Virtue Hampton performed as the Hamptons Sisters jazz duo until 2006.

=== Early years ===
The Hampton family's band was initially named Deacon Hampton's Pickaninny Band, but due to the negative racial connotations, it was renamed Deacon Hampton's Family Band (also known as Deacon Hampton and His Band, or Deacon Hampton and the Cotton Pickers). The family traveled the Midwest and the East performing a vaudeville-style act at fairs, carnivals, tent shows, and private parties. In addition to dancing and presenting comedy skits, the band performed a variety of musical genres, including country, swing, rhythm and blues, polka, and jazz. In 1938, after the family made an unsuccessful trip to California to find work in the Hollywood film industry, the Hamptons settled in the Indianapolis, Indiana, area and continued touring and performing with their band.

=== Jazz performers ===
During World War II the family band took a temporary break, but the four Hampton sisters formed a short-lived quartet called The Hamptonians and later performed as the Hampton Sisters in local clubs. When their father retired in 1945 and their oldest brother, Duke, took over as leader of the family band, the sisters joined his fourteen-piece orchestra. In addition to the Hampton siblings, Duke Hampton's swing band included several well-known Indianapolis jazz musicians, such as Alonzo "Pookie" Johnson and Bill Penick on saxophone, trombonist-bass player Eugene Fowlkes, and drummers Sonny Johnson, Dick Dickerson, and Thomas Whitted. According to a later interview with Virtue Hampton, who married Whitted, each member of the group had a role and no one was singled out as the star.

In May 1952, after Duke Hampton's band was among the winners of a Pittsburgh Courier popularity poll of its readers, the Hampton siblings performed in concert at New York City's Carnegie Hall on the same bill as the Lionel Hampton band, the Nat King Cole Trio, and singer Billy Eckstein. During the concert the Hamptons performed "The Push, " which was written by their brother, "Lucky" Hampton. Duke Hampton's band later returned to New York to perform at Harlem's Apollo Theater and the Savoy Ballroom.

In addition to touring, the Hamptons performed as the house band in Indianapolis nightclubs, such as Cotton Club and the Sunset Terrace along Indiana Avenue, the center of the city's jazz scene and the entertainment hub of the city's African-American community. They also played a long-term engagement at a North Meridian Street club that was known under various names including Stein's, Nick and Jerry's, and Jim and Hy's. Duke Hampton's band continued to tour the United States and later became the house band at the Cotton Club in Cincinnati, Ohio. When the group was not on tour, the Hampton family home in Indianapolis served as a gathering place for local jazz musicians who came to rehearse with the band. As David Baker, a former Indiana University jazz studies professor explained, "These siblings dominated the music scene on the Avenue in the 1940s and '50s."

=== Recording artists ===
In 1954 the Hampton Sisters signed a recording contract. Their first 78-rpm recording was "Hey Little Boy," a fast-tempo "jump" tune, and "My Heat Tells Me," a love ballad. Aletra Hampton also sang on the Hampton family band's recording of "Lonesome Women Blues." Her other notable songs include "Baby Please Be Good To Me" and "The Push," a family favorite.

== Later years ==
After Duke Hampton's group disbanded in the 1950s, Dawn Hampton began pursuing a solo career in 1959 as a cabaret singer and, later, a swing dancer in New York City. Aletra, Virtue, and Carmalita Hampton, continued to perform as the Hampton Sisters.

Dawn Hampton nearly lost the use of her voice in 1964, but recovered and continued performing for another twenty years. She wrote and recorded "Life Is What You Make It," the title song of her compact disc, as her response to the ordeal. In 1989 she collaborated with Mark Nedler to write music and lyrics for Red Light, a mini-opera that won a Manhattan Association of Cabaret (MAC) award in 1990. She also collaborated on music and lyrics for a play, Madame C. J. Walker, in 1990, and appeared as a dancer in the swing dance scene of Spike Lee's film, Malcolm X (1992).

Carmalita Hampton eventually moved to Chicago, Illinois, where she worked for the U.S. Postal Service for seventeen years, retiring in 1978. After returning to Indianapolis in 1981, she reunited with her sisters, Aletra and Virtue, to perform as the Hampton Sisters trio after a hiatus of nearly twenty years. Following Carmalita's death in 1987, Aletra and Virtue Hampton reinvented the Hampton Sisters as a jazz duo and performed mostly in the Indianapolis area.

In 2003 the Indiana Historical Society released The Hampton Sisters, A Jazz Tribute, a compact disc featuring Aletra Hampton on piano and vocals, Virtue Hampton Whitted on bass and vocals, Alonzo "Pookie" Johnson on saxophone, and Lawrence Clark III on drums. The Hampton Sisters continued to perform together until 2006. The Hampton family was also the subject of a PBS documentary, The Unforgettable Hampton Family (2011). Dawn, Virtue, and Aletra Hampton appear in the film with two of their brothers, Locksley "Slide" and Maceo Hampton.

== Death and legacy ==
Carmalita Hampton died in Indianapolis on May 15, 1987; Virtue Hampton Whitted died in Indianapolis on January 17, 2007, at the age of eighty-four; Aletra Hampton died in Indianapolis on November 12, 2007, at the age of ninety-two; and Dawn Hampton died in New York City on September 25, 2016, at the age of eighty-eight. Aletra Hampton and Virtue Hampton Whitted's remains are interred at Crown Hill Cemetery in Indianapolis.

As Aletra Hampton often described her musical family, "We are not what you call musicians, we are musical performers, and there is a difference." For several decades in the mid-twentieth century the Hampton Sisters were especially known in the Indianapolis area for their jazz and swing musical performances. In addition, Dawn Hampton became known in New York City for her performances as a cabaret singer and jazz musician, as well as a songwriter and swing dancer. Critics called her a "singer's singer" and the "Queen of Cabaret."

== Awards and honors ==
- The Hampton family were recipients of Indiana's Governor Arts Award in 1991 for their contributions to the state's musical heritage.
- In 1999 the Indianapolis Jazz Foundation inducted Aletra Hampton and Virtue Hampton Whitted into their Hall of Fame.
- On November 16, 2003, the Indiana Historical Society hosted a benefit concert to honor Aletra Hampton and Virtue Hampton Whitted.
- In 2004 Aletra Hampton and Virtue Hampton Whitted were awarded honorary doctorate of music degrees from the University of Indianapolis.
- In 2006 Aletra Hampton and Virtue Hampton Whitted were recipients of Indianapolis NUVO newspaper's Cultural Vision Lifetime Achievement Award.
- New York's Private Lives magazine recognized Dawn Hampton's career as a vocalist with a Lifetime Achievement in Cabaret Award.

== Discography ==
- Aletra Hampton was vocalist on the Hampton family band's recording of "Lonesome Women Blues." She also sang "The Push," written by her brother, " Lucky" Hampton.
- Aletra Hampton, vocalist, "Please Be Good To Me," with Duke Hampton and His Orchestra on Rare Blues Girls from King (LP, compilation), 1988, Sing Records
- The Hampton Sisters, A Jazz Tribute (CD), 2003, Indiana Historical Society.
