= Aletra Hampton =

American singer (1915–2007)

- Born: Aletra Hampton; October 8, 1915; Middletown, Ohio, US
- Died: November 12, 2007 (aged 92) Indianapolis, Indiana, US
- Genres: Jazz and blues
- Occupation: Musician
- Instruments: jazz piano and vocals
- Formerly of: Deacon Hampton's Family Band and The Hampton Sisters

Aletra Hampton (October 8, 1915 – November 12, 2007) was an American jazz pianist and singer, known for her performances during the 1940s and 1950s as a member of the Hampton family band and The Hampton Sisters, a quartet she formed during World War II with her siblings, Carmalita, Virtue and Dawn. The Middletown, Ohio, native began performing at a young age and moved with her family to Indianapolis, Indiana, in 1938. Hampton and her eight siblings performed in the 1940s and 1950s in Duke Hampton's band, their oldest brother's jazz orchestra. The group became well known as the house band at nightclubs in Indianapolis and Cincinnati, Ohio, and toured the United States playing at venues that included New York City's Carnegie Hall and Harlem's Apollo Theater and the Savoy Ballroom. The family's band dissolved in the 1950s, but Hampton and two of her sisters, Virtue and Carmalita, continued to perform as the Hampton Sisters for several more years. The trio reunited in Indianapolis in 1981 after almost a twenty-year hiatus. Hampton and her sister, Virtue, continued to perform as a duo, mostly in Indianapolis, until 2006.

Hampton and her siblings received Indiana's Governor Arts Award (1991) for their contributions to the state's musical heritage. In addition, Hampton was inducted into the Indianapolis Jazz Foundation's Hall of Fame (1999); received an honorary doctorate of music degree from the University of Indianapolis (2004); and was a recipient of NUVO newspaper's Cultural Vision Lifetime Achievement Award (2006). The Indiana Historical Society released The Hampton Sisters, A Jazz Tribute (2003), a compact disc featuring Aletra and Virtue Hampton. Close members of Hampton's musical family include her brother, "Slide" Hampton, a National Endowment for the Arts Jazz Master; her sister, Dawn, a well-known New York City cabaret singer and swing dancer; and her nephew, Pharez Whitted, a jazz trumpeter.

== Early life and family ==
Aletra Hampton was born on October 8, 1915, in Middletown, Ohio. She was the oldest of Laura (Burford) and Clarke "Deacon" Hampton's twelve children. Clarke Hampton was born in Batavia, Ohio, to William and Elizabeth Hampton in 1877, and studied music and art while attending a military academy in Xenia, Ohio. He married Laura Burford, a native of Richmond, Virginia, in 1908. Both of Hampton's parents played musical instruments. Her father taught himself to play saxophone and drums; her mother played piano.

Three of Hampton's eleven siblings died young, but her eight surviving siblings included three sisters (Carmalita, Virtue, and Dawn) and five brothers (Clarke Jr. "Duke," Marcus, Russell "Lucky," Maceo, and Locksley "Slide"). Their parents taught each of the Hampton siblings to play at least one musical instrument. Aletra had no formal musical training, but learned to play the pianos and also sang. Under the leadership of their father, the children began performing in the family's band at a young age. The Hamptons moved to Indianapolis, Indiana, in 1938, when Aletra was in her early twenties.

Hampton married and had two children, but the marriage ended in divorce after fourteen years. Hampton's youngest sister, Dawn Hampton, moved to New York City in 1958 and became a cabaret singer and swing dancer. "Slide" Hampton, their youngest brother, is a jazz trombonist, composer, and arranger, as well as a two-time Grammy Award-winner and a recipient of a National Endowment for the Arts Jazz Masters Award (2005). Some sources report that Hampton is also a distant cousin of Lionel Hampton.

== Career ==
Hampton began her long career as a musical performer at a young age. During World War II she formed a quartet with her sisters that eventually became known as the Hamptons Sisters. The women also performed with the Duke Hampton band, their oldest brother's jazz orchestra. When the family band dissolved in the 1950s, Aletra, Carmalita, and Virtue Hampton established themselves as a trio and performed as the Hamptons Sisters for several more years. The three women reunited in 1981 after a nearly twenty-year hiatus. Aletra and Virtue Hampton continued to perform as a jazz duo until 2006.

=== Early years ===
The family's band was initially named Deacon Hampton's Pickaninny Band, but due to the negative racial connotations, it was renamed Deacon Hampton's Family Band (also known as Deacon Hampton and His Band, or Deacon Hampton and the Cotton Pickers). The family traveled the Midwest and the East performing at fairs, carnivals, tent shows, and private parties. In addition to dancing and presenting comedy skits, the band performed a variety of musical genres, including country, swing, rhythm and blues, polka, and jazz. In 1938, after the family's unsuccessful trip to California to find work in the Hollywood film industry, the Hamptons relocated to Indianapolis, Indiana, where the family band performed in local clubs and continued to tour.

=== Jazz performer ===
During World War II the family band took a temporary break, but Hampton and her sisters (Virtue, Carmalita, and Dawn) formed a short-lived quartet called The Hamptonians and later performed as the Hampton Sisters. When their father retired in 1945 and their oldest brother, Duke, took over as leader of the family band, the sisters joined his fourteen-piece jazz orchestra. In addition to the nine surviving Hampton siblings, the group included several well-known Indiana Avenue musicians, such as Alonzo "Pookie" Johnson and Bill Penick on saxophone, trombonist/bass player Eugene Fowlkes, and drummers Sonny Johnson, Dick Dickerson, and Thomas Whitted. Aletra Hampton was known as the "Warrior" among the group's musicians and had a subtle sense of humor.

In May 1952, after Duke Hampton's band was among the winners of a Pittsburgh Courier popularity poll of its readers, the group performed in concert at New York City's Carnegie Hall on the same bill as the Lionel Hampton band, the Nat King Cole Trio, and singer Billy Eckstein. Duke Hampton's band returned to New York a short time later to perform at Harlem's Apollo Theater and the Savoy Ballroom. The group became the house band at the Cotton Club and the Sunset Terrace, two well-known nightclubs on Indiana Avenue, the entertainment hub of the city's black community, and at other venues in town. Duke Hampton's band also toured the United States and later became the house band at the Cotton Club in Cincinnati, Ohio. When the group was not on tour, the Hampton family home in Indianapolis became a gathering place for local jazz musicians who came to rehearse with the band. As David Baker, a former Indiana University jazz studies professor who knew the family explained, "These siblings dominated the music scene on the Avenue in the 1940s and '50s."

In 1954 Hampton and her three sisters signed a recording contract. Their first 78-rpm recording was "Hey Little Boy," a fast-tempo tune, and "My Heat Tells Me," a love ballad. After Duke Hampton's group disbanded in the 1950s, Aletra and her sisters, Virtue and Carmalita, continued to perform as the Hampton Sisters for several more years. Carmalita Hampton eventually moved to Chicago, Illinois, while Dawn, the youngest Hampton sister, and "Slide," the youngest brother, pursued solo careers as entertainers in New York City. When Carmalita returned to Indianapolis in 1981, the Hampton Sisters trio reunited after a break of nearly twenty years.

== Later years ==
Hampton felt a sense of responsibility for sharing her family's musical heritage with new audiences in her later years, especially with students in local Indianapolis schools. Aletra and Virtue Hampton continued to perform as a duo after Carmalita's death in 1987, mostly in the Indianapolis area for gatherings at schools and at other venues until 2006. In addition, the Indiana Historical Society released The Hampton Sisters, A Jazz Tribute (2003), a compact disc featuring Aletra Hampton on piano and vocals, Virtue Hampton on bass and vocals, Alonzo "Pookie" Johnson on saxophone, and Lawrence Clark III on drums.

== Death and legacy ==
Aletra Hampton died in Indianapolis, Indiana, on November 12, 2007, at the age of ninety-two. Her remains are interred at Crown Hill Cemetery in Indianapolis (Section 212, Lot 316). The longtime Indianapolis jazz musician is best remembered for her strong vocals and piano performances as a member of the Hampton Sisters and the Hampton family jazz band.

Hampton's musical career spanned more than eighty years. Although she had a reputation for being a tough leader of the Hampton Sisters and held the family band together, drummer Lawrence Clark III also described her as compassionate individual with a strong faith. Hampton credited her father for her strong and disciplined work, and as she often described her musical family, "We are not what you call musicians, we are musical performers, and there is a difference."

== Awards and honors ==
- Hampton and other members of her family were recipients of Indiana's Governor Arts Award in 1991 for their contributions to the state's musical heritage.
- In 1999 the Indianapolis Jazz Foundation inducted Aletra Hampton and her sister, Virtue Hampton Whitted, into their Hall of Fame.
- On November 16, 2003, the Indiana Historical Society hosted a benefit concert to honor Hampton and her sister, Virtue Hampton Whitted.
- In 2004 Aletra Hampton and Virtue Hampton Whitted were awarded honorary doctorate of music degrees from the University of Indianapolis.
- In 2006 Indianapolis's NUVO newspaper awarded the two Hampton sisters a Cultural Vision Lifetime Achievement Award.

== Discography ==
- Vocalist on the Hampton family band's recording of "Lonesome Women Blues." Hampton also sang "The Push," written by her brother, " Lucky" Hampton.
- Vocalist, "Please Be Good To Me," with Duke Hampton and His Orchestra on Rare Blues Girls from King (LP, compilation), 1988, Sing Records
