= Organ trio =

Form of jazz ensemble

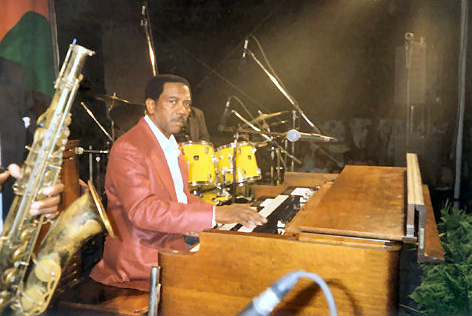
Jazz organist Jimmy Smith at a show in Italy in 1994; the sax and drumkit of the other trio members can be seen in this picture.

An organ trio is a form of jazz ensemble consisting of three musicians: a Hammond organ player, a drummer, and either a jazz guitarist or a saxophonist. In some cases the saxophonist will join a trio which consists of an organist, guitarist, and drummer, making it a quartet. Organ trios were a popular type of jazz ensemble for club and bar settings in the 1950s and 1960s, performing a blues-based style of jazz that incorporated elements of R&B. The organ trio format was characterized by long improvised solos and an exploration of different musical "moods".

In organ trios, the Hammond organist plays several roles, including playing the basslines (either on the bass pedalboard or on the lower manual of the organ), playing chords ("comping"), and playing lead melodic lines and solos. In organ trios with a guitarist, the guitarist usually 'fills in' the musical parts that the organist is not performing. For example, if the organist is soloing and playing a bassline, the guitarist may play chords.

Organ trios of the 1950s and 1960s often played soul jazz, a groove-infused style that incorporated blues, gospel and rhythm and blues. 1970s-era organ trios such as Tony Williams' band Lifetime played jazz-rock fusion. In the 1990s and 2000s, organ trios such as Medeski, Martin and Wood and Soulive became involved in the burgeoning jamband scene.

== History ==
=== Pre-1950s ===
While jazz musicians such as Fats Waller and Count Basie explored the use of organ in jazz ensembles in the 1920s and 1930s, it was not until the late 1940s that Hammond players such as Wild Bill Davis pioneered the organ trio format. Musicians such as Davis and the Milt Herth Trio realized that the amplified Hammond B3 organ "put the power of a full-sized big band in the hands of one musician", with the rotating Leslie speaker-equipped amplified cabinet adding a room-filling, "king-sized sound."

=== 1950s–1960s ===
In the 1950s and 1960s, the organ trio became a common musical ensemble in bars and taverns in the US, especially in downtown areas of major cities. Organ trios used the powerful amplified sound of the Hammond organ, and its ability to fill multiple musical roles (basslines, chords, and lead lines), to fill a bar or club with a volume of sound that would have previously required a much larger ensemble. While bar owners liked this money-saving aspect of the organ trio, the format also had a number of musical advantages. The organ trio was a more intimate, smaller ensemble, which facilitated communication between musicians, and allowed more freedom for spontaneous changes of mood or tempo, and for "stretching out" on extended solos.

According to Tom Vicker, the "most famous of the early [organ trio] grinders was Philadelphia's Bill Doggett, who recorded instrumentals for King Records in the early Fifties". The next organists to come along were Hank Marr, Dave "Baby" Cortez, Jimmy McGriff, and then the "bossest organ swinger yet, Jimmy Smith". After Smith's death in 2005, Variety magazine writer Phil Gallo eulogized Smith as a man who "[s]ingle-handedly reinvented the Hammond B3 organ for jazz and created the model for the organ trio".

During the 1960s, jazz guitarists such as Howard Roberts, Grant Green, Kenny Burrell, George Benson, and Wes Montgomery often performed in organ trios, and organ trio recordings often made the R&B and pop charts. Hammond organ players such as "Brother" Jack McDuff, Johnny "Hammond" Smith and Richard "Groove" Holmes often performed and recorded in organ trios. The "body of work by the leaders in the organ trio idiom in its heyday has been well documented, owing to the fact during that era, based on record sales, the organ groups -- most significantly those led by Jimmy Smith -- represented perhaps the most popular genre of jazz". Guitarist Grant Green performed a blend of jazz, funk, and boogaloo, collaborating frequently with organists "Big" John Patton, Jack McDuff, and Neal Creque and with drummer Idris Muhammad.

In the late 1960s, as jazz musicians began to explore the new genre of jazz-rock fusion, organ trios led by organists such as Larry Young "ventured into more remote territory, expanding the harmonic palette of the organ trio form". Young pioneered a new approach to playing the Hammond B3. In contrast to Jimmy Smith's blues-influenced soul-jazz style, in which songs were structured over chord progressions, Young favored a modal approach to playing, in which songs were based on musical modes rather than chord progressions.

=== 1970s–1980s ===
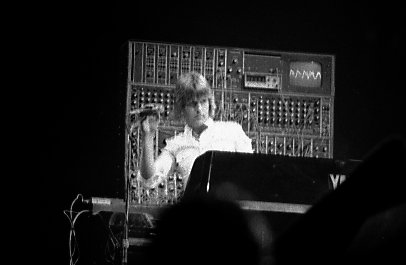
Keith Emerson of Emerson, Lake & Palmer, Maple Leaf Gardens, Toronto 1978

In the 1970s, the 1960s-style organ trios based around a Hammond organ were eclipsed by the new trend of jazz-rock fusion, and small ensembles increasingly used electronic keyboards such as Moog synthesizer in place of the Hammond organ. Synthesizers allowed musicians to make new electronic sounds that were not possible on the electromechanical Hammond organs. Emerson, Lake & Palmer was one organ trio that successfully branched between the changing times between their debut performances in 1970 towards the end of the decade, with Keith Emerson on the Hammond B3 organ, Greg Lake on either the guitar or bass guitar, and Carl Palmer on drums; Emerson was one of the earliest in moving into synthetic sound. Veteran Hammond players such as Emerson and Charles Earland began using synthesizers to "update" their sound to the pop-disco styles of the late 1970s.

There were a small number of well-known organ trios during the 1970s. John Abercrombie had a futuristic-sounding organ trio with Jan Hammer on Hammond and Moog bass, and Jack DeJohnette on drums. Tony Williams' fusion band Lifetime, which lasted from 1969 to 1975, was an organ trio with John McLaughlin on guitar and Larry Young on organ. Lifetime was a pioneering band of the fusion movement, combining rock, R&B, and jazz.

=== 1990s ===
==== Traditional groups ====
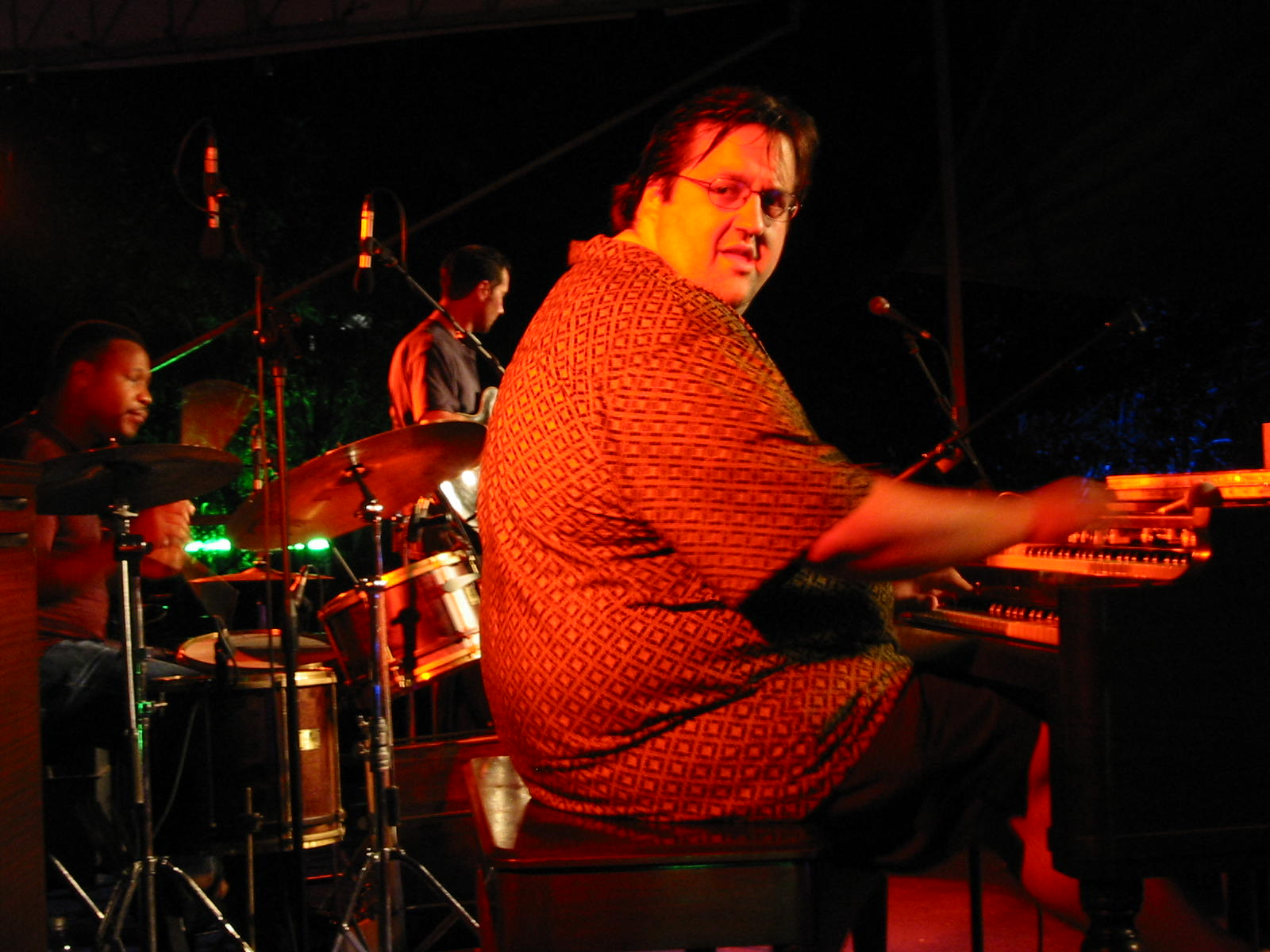
Jazz organist Joey Defrancesco, pictured here in 2002, has recorded albums that recapture the "old school" organ trio sound of the 1960s.

In the 1990s and 2000s, there was a revival of organ trios in the Jazz, Blues, Soul and R&B genres. In the late 1990s and early 2000s, before his death in 2005, Jimmy Smith had a comeback, recording albums and playing in clubs. Some groups, such as the organ trio led by the Jimmy Smith-mentored Hammond player Joey DeFrancesco, aimed to recapture the traditional sounds and blues-influenced jazz feel of the 1960s organ trios of Smith, McDuff and Don Patterson.

The Deep Blue Organ Trio, a Chicago guitar-organ trio, recorded two albums for Delmark Records and two with Origin Records, and toured with Steely Dan several times. In the tradition of Wes Montgomery and George Benson their sound was infused with more African, blues and post-Bop rhythms with focus on the play of both organist Chris Foreman and guitarist Bobby Broom.

The Danish organ trio, Ibrahim Electric, also explored different kinds of developments from jazz, such as afro-beat, and boogaloo with a strong blues traditional influence, but with the main focus on the Hammond B-3 played by Jeppe Tuxen.

In 2007 Steve Howe created the Steve Howe Trio, inspired mainly by Kenny Burrell's work.

==== Other variations ====
Organ trios such as Medeski, Martin & Wood (MMW), Niacin, Soulive and Mike Mangan's Big Organ Trio mix jazz with a range of different styles such as 1970s soul jazz, jazz fusion, and jam band-style improvisation. MMW used a variation of the organ trio format, since the band includes Hammond organ, upright bass and drums. The New York organ trio Darediablo blends funk, progressive rock, fusion, and hard rock into a heavy, riff-laden sound. More rarely, some blues bands use the organ trio format, such as the UK band led by guitarist Matt Schofield (the Matt Schofield Trio's organist is Jonny Henderson).

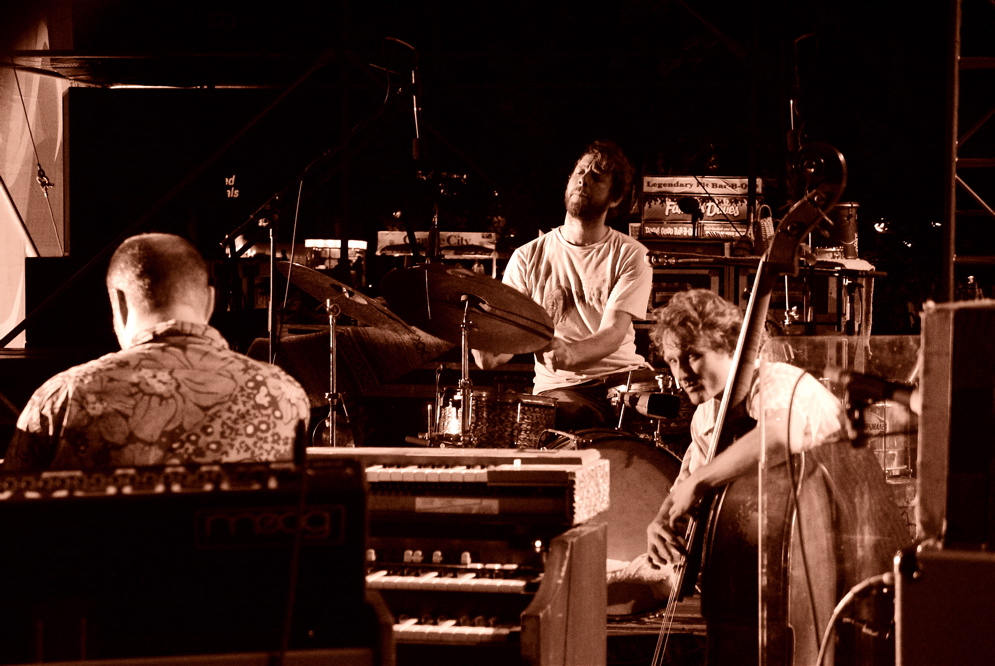
The Medeski, Martin and Wood organ trio demonstrates that an organ trio can come in different varieties; in place of a sax or electric guitarist, this band has an upright bass player as the third member.

An unusual example of an organ trio-influenced performer is Charlie Hunter, who used a customized 8-string guitar to emulate the role and sound of a Hammond Organ. He performed bass lines on his guitar's three electric bass-range strings, while playing chords and melody lines on the higher strings. In the mid-2000s, saxophonist/bass-clarinettist/flutist James Carter has performed and recorded modern and more traditional jazz, with his James Carter Organ Trio, with Gerard Gibbs on Hammond B-3 and Leonard King on drums. These recordings include Live at Baker's Keyboard Lounge in 2001 (released 2004), and Out of Nowhere, in 2004, and drummer Leonard King's Extending the Language in 2005.

=== 2000s and 2010s ===
==== Jazz groups ====
After the Deep Blue Organ Trio disbanded in 2013, Chicago guitarist Bobby Broom, who had been a pivotal player in the group, launched his own organ trio The Bobby Broom Organi-Sation featuring new young Chicago musicians, Ben Paterson on the Hammond B-3 and alternating drummers Makaya McCraven and Kobie Watkins. The group toured with Steely Dan on their Jamalot Ever After North American tour, and began working in the Chicago area and work on their first album.

==== Other variations ====
The English progressive rock band Van der Graaf Generator effectively operated as an "organ trio" beginning in 2006, when saxophonist/flautist David Jackson left, leaving the core of the early-1970s lineup (Peter Hammill (vocals/guitar/piano), Hugh Banton (organ/keyboards) and Guy Evans (drums/percussion) to continue to the present day (as of 2012). Banton, a classically trained organist, has provided the bass from the organ (occasionally playing bass guitar in the studio) since Nic Potter left the band in 1970. Therefore, the Van der Graaf Generator lineup of 1970-71 (Hammill, Banton, Evans and Jackson) which recorded Pawn Hearts (1971), could also be viewed as an "organ-trio-plus-saxophone".

== Musical style, tradition and variants ==
=== As a musical style or tradition ===
While the term "organ trio" is typically a reference to a type of small ensemble, the term "organ trio" is also used to refer to the musical styles, genres, and tradition of the 1950s/1960s era of organ trio playing. Although the components of the "organ trio tradition" are a subject of debate, the 1950s/1960s organ trio style tends to have more blues influences than other small-group jazz from this era, and it often blurs the lines between blues, R&B, and jazz. As well, organ trios tend to be focused on, or built around the sound of the organ.

The organ trio style has also been associated with soul jazz, a development of hard bop which incorporated strong influences from blues, gospel and rhythm and blues. However, unlike hard bop, soul jazz generally emphasized repetitive grooves and melodic hooks, and its improvisations were often less complex than in other jazz styles.

Music critics discussing 1990s and 2000s-era organ trios often refer to how a modern-day group is positioned vis-à-vis the "organ trio tradition" of the 1950s and 1960s. For example, John Koenig's review of guitarist Rick Zunigar's organ trio recordings notes that Zunigar's "...conception of the organ trio gives us a present-day look at the genre, filtered through all of the tradition of the past, but also infused with other influences and trends that have their roots in the major jazz movements of the last 30 years."

=== Variant forms ===
More rarely, an organ trio might consist of a Hammond organist and two jazz guitarists, or a Hammond organist, a double bassist, and a drummer. For example, organist Shirley Scott had an organ trio that included a bass player and a drummer. In some cases, a fourth musician will be added to a traditional organ trio, such as a saxophone player or vocalist. In this case, the group may be billed as "saxophone player and organ trio" or "singer and organ trio." For example, reviewer Dan McClenaghan, from All About Jazz, said that "...a fine organ trio [was] backing a talented saxophonist" in one of tenor saxophonist David Sills' recordings. Describing these four-musician ensembles as a "trio plus one", instead of as a quartet, may appear to be a misnomer.

However, this approach can be justified because there are different musical styles and traditions associated with different types of jazz ensembles. As such, if a concert is billed as a jazz quartet (e.g. a saxophone and a rhythm section), the audience has expectations about the repertoire and musical styles than if a concert is billed as an organ trio with a saxophone. There are specific musical styles, genres, and traditions that are associated with the 1950s/1960s era of organ trio playing (see section above).

== Other meanings ==
=== Baroque-era works for solo organ ===
J.S. Bach and other Baroque composers from the 17th century and early 18th century wrote many organ works called trio sonatas, often based on chorale prelude melodies. These organ trio sonata compositions are sometimes referred to as "organ trios." Bach's organ trio sonatas are written for a single instrument—the baroque pipe organ. They are nonetheless called trio sonatas because they are written in three independent melodic lines, or "voices". To help the audience hear the three different melodic lines, Bach indicated that the trio sonatas should be performed on two separate manuals (organ keyboards), with the bass pedalboard supplying the third, lower part. To further help the audience to hear the different upper melodic lines, organists typically use different registrations for each manual by selecting different organ stops.

== See also ==
- Jazz
- Hammond organ
- Clonewheel organ
