= The Bobby Broom Organi-Sation =

Bobby Broom Organi-Sation
- Origin: Chicago, Illinois, United States
- Genres: Hard bop; Post-bop; Progressive jazz; Soul-jazz; Jazz-funk
- Years active: 2014-present
- Label: Origin Records
- Members: Bobby Broom; Ben Paterson; Kobie Watkins; Makaya McCraven

The Bobby Broom Organi-Sation is a Chicago based jazz organ trio composed of jazz guitarist Bobby Broom, Hammond B3 organist Ben Paterson and drummer Kobie Watkins. Broom is a 2015 DownBeat Readers Poll and multi-year Critics Poll honoree for his work as one of the top jazz guitarists in the world, McCraven and Watkins also perform with Broom's main group, The Bobby Broom Trio.

Broom formed the group in 2014 after a call by Steely Dan's Walter Becker and Donald Fagen for the Deep Blue Organ Trio which had disbanded following the rock group's 2013 tour.

The Bobby Broom Organi-Sation opened for Steely Dan on their Jamalot Ever After 2014 national tour that spanned 52 dates, and 43 cities, across the United States and Canada.

The group is the evolution of Broom's passion for the concept of the guitar-organ-drum trio established by, among others, the ground-breaking Jazz legend Wes Montgomery with his landmark 1959 album A Dynamic New Sound:Guitar, Organ and Drums

For the 2014 tour, the group included: Bobby Broom, Ben Paterson a Philadelphia-born jazz organist based in New York City, and drummer Makaya McCraven or Kobie Watkins.

Since that time, the group has continued to perform with drummer, Kobie Watkins exclusively, playing such venues as the Beijing Blue Note in 2017 and the Umbria Jazz Festival in 2018. The Organi-Sation has released two recordings: 2018's, Soul Fingers and 2024's, Jamalot – Live.
