= Whitted =

Whitted may refer to:

- Albert Whitted Airport, small public airport in St. Petersburg, Florida, United States
- Alvis Whitted (born 1974), American football player
- Chiles-Whitted UFO Encounter on July 24, 1948, when two American commercial pilots had a near collision with a strange torpedo shaped object
- J. Turner Whitted, American computer scientist
- Pharez Whitted (born 1960), American jazz trumpeter, composer, and producer
- Possum Whitted (1890–1962), American outfielder and third baseman
- Virtue Hampton Whitted (1922–2007), American jazz singer and bassist
