= Mike Mangan =

Mike Mangan may refer to:

- Mike Mangan (rugby union) (born 1975), former American rugby union player
- Mike Mangan (musician), American musician
