= Freddy Schauwecker =

German musician and author (born 1943)

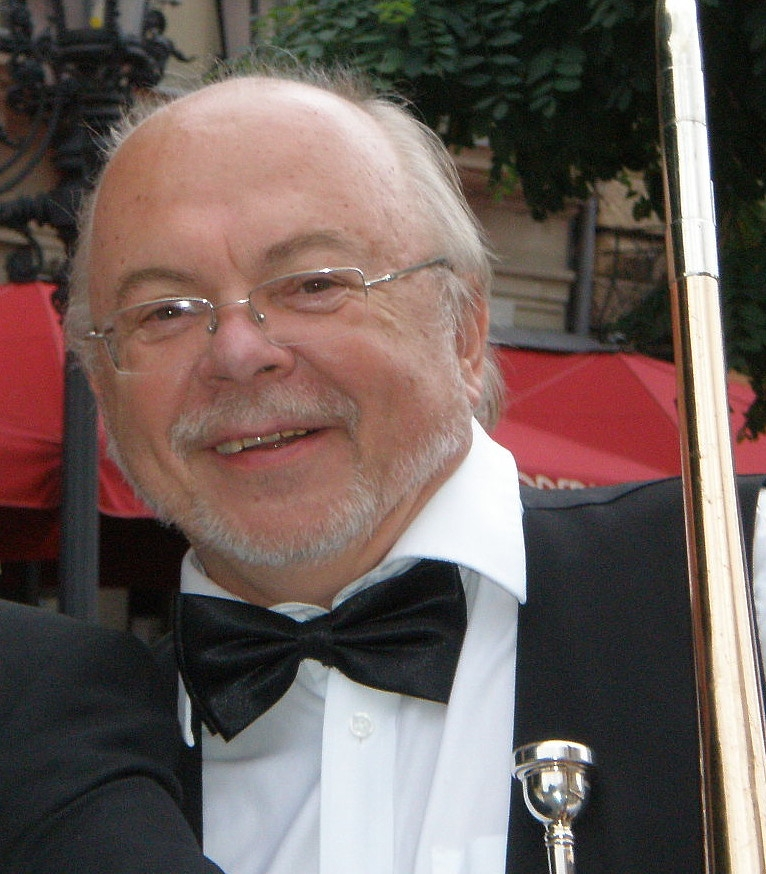
Schauwecker in 2009

Freddy Schauwecker (born 1943) is a German jazz musician (trombone, bandleader), advertising specialist and author.

Schauwecker grow up in a musical family, and in his youth, he became a fan of New Orleans Jazz. At the end of the 1950s, he learned to play the jazz trombone. His idols at that time being Kid Ory and Chris Barber. After finishing school, he successfully concluded a training in advertising. Following his military service with the German Bundeswehr, he worked in Düsseldorf for a major English company in the pharmaceutical branch as advertising manager. After that he worked for many years as marketing communications manager of an American concern which worldwide was operating in the field of process technology.

In 1962 he became active as an amateur musician and played with popular jazz-musicians over years. In the starting phase he played with music star and composer Udo Lindenberg, who stayed in his house for a short time. In 1968 he founded The Jolly Jazz Orchestra, which has existed until today, concentrating on swing and Dixieland. With this band Schauwecker 1993 played a lot of gigs in the French Quarter of New Orleans, Louisiana. They had an invitation to play there for their 25th anniversary. The band, which, after a single (1975), released thirteen albums and several DVDs, and played in among other places, e.g. the Azores, the Canary Islands, Mallorca, and Benelux countries, and they had invitations to Beijing and Hong Kong.

In later years, Schauwecker has been interviewing many musicians and their contemporaries about traditional jazz and swing music. In more than ten years he collected that information and published it in articles in German jazz magazines and 2013 in his book So war's wirklich (That's How It Really Was), together with other stories, telling the history of many evergreens of this music. In 2015 the book was updated to Let's go to the Best od Jazz
