= Virtue Hampton Whitted =

- Born: Virtue Hampton; February 22, 1922; Middletown, Ohio, U.S.
- Died: January 17, 2007 (aged 84) Indianapolis, Indiana
- Genres: Jazz, blues
- Occupation: Musician
- Instruments: Double bass, vocals
- Formerly of: Deacon Hampton's Family Band and The Hampton Sisters

Virtue Hampton Whitted (February 22, 1922 – January 17, 2007) was an American jazz singer and bassist who is best known for her performances during the 1940s and 1950s as a member of the Hampton family band and The Hampton Sisters, a musical group she formed during World War II with her siblings, Aletra, Carmalita, and Dawn Hampton.

The Middletown, Ohio, native began performing at a young age and moved to Indianapolis, Indiana, in 1938. Hampton and her eight siblings performed in Duke Hampton's band, their oldest brother's jazz orchestra, and became a well-known house band at nightclubs in Indianapolis and Cincinnati, Ohio. The group also toured the United States, playing at venues that included Carnegie Hall, Apollo Theater, and the Savoy Ballroom. After the family's band dissolved in the 1950s, Hampton and two of her sisters, Aletra and Carmalita, performed as the Hampton Sisters for several more years. The trio reunited in Indianapolis in 1981 after a break of nearly twenty years. Hampton and her sister, Aletra, remained active in Indianapolis's jazz community, performing as a duo until 2006.

Hampton and her siblings received Indiana's Governor Arts Award (1991) for their contributions to the state's musical heritage. In addition, Hampton was inducted into the Indianapolis Jazz Foundation's Hall of Fame (1999), received an honorary doctorate of music degree from the University of Indianapolis (2004), and was a recipient of NUVO newspaper 's Cultural Vision Lifetime Achievement Award (2006). The Indiana Historical Society released The Hampton Sisters, A Jazz Tribute (2003), a compact disc featuring Virtue and Aletra Hampton. Members of Hampton's musical family include her son, Pharez Whitted, a jazz trumpeter; her youngest brother, "Slide" Hampton, a NEA Jazz Master; and her sister, Dawn, a New York City cabaret singer and swing dancer.

== Early life and family ==
Virtue Hampton was born on February 22, 1922, in Middletown, Ohio, to Laura (Burford) and Clarke "Deacon" Hampton. Clarke Hampton was born in Batavia, Ohio, to William and Elizabeth Hampton in 1877, and studied music and art while attending a military academy in Xenia, Ohio. He married Laura Burford, a native of Richmond, Virginia, in 1908. Both of Virtue Hampton's parents played musical instruments: Clarke played saxophone and drums; Laura played piano.

Hampton had eleven siblings, three of whom died young. Her eight surviving siblings included three sisters (Carmalita, Aletra, and Dawn) and five brothers (Clarke Jr. "Duke," Marcus, Russell "Lucky," Maceo, and Locksley "Slide"). Their parents taught each of the Hampton siblings to play at least one musical instrument. Virtue learned to play the double bass and also sang. Under their father's leadership, the children began performing in the family's band at an early age. The Hampton family moved to Indianapolis, Indiana, in 1938.

Virtue Hampton married Thomas Whitted Sr., a drummer in the Duke Hampton Orchestra. (Whitted also played with noted jazz musicians, such as Wes Montgomery and Freddie Hubbard in the 1950s.) The Whitteds marriage of more than fifty years ended in divorce. Their son, Pharez Whitted, is a Chicago, Illinois, jazz trumpeter and music educator.

Hampton's youngest sister, Dawn Hampton, moved to New York City in 1958 and became a cabaret singer and swing dancer. Their youngest brother, "Slide" Hampton, a jazz trombonist, composer, and arranger, is a two-time Grammy Award-winner and a recipient of a National Endowment for the Arts Jazz Masters Award (2005). Some sources suggest that they are distant cousins of bandleader Lionel Hampton.

== Career ==
Hampton began performing in her family's band at a young age. During World War II she formed a quartet with her sisters that eventually became known as the Hamptons Sisters. The women also performed with the Duke Hampton band, their oldest brother's jazz orchestra. When the family band dissolved in the 1950s, Virtue and her two sisters, Carmalita and Aletra, established the Hampton Sisters as a trio and continued to perform for several more years. The threesome reunited in 1981, following a nearly twenty-year hiatus. After Carmalita's death in 1987, Virtue and Aletra Hampton continued to perform as a jazz duo until 2006.

=== Early years ===
The Hampton family initially formed as the Deacon Hampton's Pickaninny Band, but due to the negative racial connotations, the group changed its name to Deacon Hampton's Family Band (also known as Deacon Hampton and His Band, or Deacon Hampton and the Cotton Pickers). The family traveled the Midwest, especially in Pennsylvania, West Virginia, Kentucky, and Indiana, performing at fairs, carnivals, tent shows, and private parties. In addition to dancing and presenting comedy skits, the band performed a variety of musical genres, including country, blues, polka, and jazz music. In 1938, after an unsuccessful trip to California to find work in the Hollywood film industry, the family relocated to Indianapolis, Indiana, where the Hamptons performed in local clubs went on tour.

=== Jazz performer ===
The family band took a temporary break during World War II, but Hampton and her sisters, Carmalita, Aletra, and Dawn, formed a short-lived quartet called The Hamptonians and later performed as the Hampton Sisters. Virtue Hampton said that The Andrews Sisters and The King Sisters were the inspiration for forming their quartet. When the oldest Hampton brother, Duke, took over as leader of the family band in 1945, following their father's retirement, Virtue Hampton and her sisters joined the group. The fourteen-piece jazz orchestra included the nine surviving Hampton siblings and several well-known Indiana Avenue musicians, such as Alonzo "Pookie" Johnson and Bill Penick on saxophone, trombonist/bass player Eugene Fowlkes, and drummers Sonny Johnson, Dick Dickerson, and Thomas Whitted, who became Virtue Hampton's husband.

In May 1952, as one of the winners in a Pittsburgh Courier popularity poll of its readers, the Hampton family band performed in concert at Carnegie Hall in New York City on the same bill as the Lionel Hampton band, the Nat King Cole Trio, and singer Billy Eckstein. Shortly after, Duke Hampton's band returned to New York to perform at the Apollo Theater and the Savoy Ballroom. The group became the house band at the Cotton Club and the Sunset Terrace nightclubs on Indiana Avenue, the center of Indianapolis's jazz scene, as well as other venues in town. Duke Hampton's jazz band also toured the United States and became the house band at the Cotton Club in Cincinnati, Ohio.

Hampton and her three sisters signed a recording contract in 1954. Their first 78-rpm recording was "Hey Little Boy" a fast-tempo tune, and "My Heat Tells Me", a love ballad. After Duke Hampton's group disbanded in the 1950s, Dawn, the youngest Hampton sister, and "Slide," the youngest brother, pursued solo careers as entertainers in New York City, while Virtue and two other sisters, Carmalita and Aletra, performed as a trio called the Hampton Sisters. The three women reunited as in 1981, after a break of nearly twenty years.

== Later years ==
Virtue and Aletra Hampton remained active in Indianapolis's jazz community after Carmalita's death in 1987 and performed as a duo. The Indiana Historical Society released The Hampton Sisters, A Jazz Tribute (2003), a compact disc featuring Virtue Hampton on bass and vocals, Aletra Hampton on piano and vocals, Alonzo "Pookie" Johnson on saxophone, and Lawrence Clark III on drums. The Hampton Sisters continued to perform until 2006 for gatherings at schools and at other venues, mostly in the Indianapolis area.

== Death and legacy ==
Virtue Hampton Whitted died on January 17, 2007, in Indianapolis, Indiana, at the age of eighty-four, one week after suffering a stroke. Her remains are interred at Crown Hill Cemetery in Indianapolis (Section 212, Lot 316). The longtime Indianapolis jazz musician is best remembered for her "booming" bass performances as a member of the Hampton Sisters and the Hampton family jazz band.

== Awards and honors ==
- Hampton and other members of her family were recipients of Indiana's Governor Arts Award in 1991 for their contributions to the state's musical heritage.
- In 1999 the Indianapolis Jazz Foundation inducted Virtue Hampton Whitted and her sister, Aletra Hampton, into their Hall of Fame.
- On November 16, 2003, the Indiana Historical Society hosted a benefit concert to honor Virtue Hampton Whitted and her sister, Aletra Hampton.
- In 2004 the two Hampton sisters were awarded honorary doctorate of music degrees from the University of Indianapolis.
- In 2006 Indianapolis's NUVO newspaper awarded Virtue Hampton Whitted and Aletra Hampton a Cultural Vision Lifetime Achievement Award.
