= Bobby Broom Plays for Monk =

Studio album by Bobby Broom
- Released: 2009
- Studio: Victorian Studios, Barrington, IL
- Genre: Jazz, jazz rock, jazz fusion
- Length: 57:00
- Label: Origin
- Producer: Bobby Broom

Bobby Broom chronology
The Way I Play (2008)	Bobby Broom Plays for Monk (2009)	Upper West Side Story (2012)

Professional ratings
Review scores
Source	Rating
AllMusic	4/5 stars

Bobby Broom Plays for Monk is a 2009 album by jazz guitarist Bobby Broom.

The album consists of eight compositions by Thelonious Monk and two other songs associated with Monk's repertoire. Its cover art is an homage to the cover of Monk's Music and its famous wagon.

== Track listing ==
All songs written by Thelonious Monk unless noted.

1. "Ask Me Now" – 5:15
2. "Evidence" – 4:17
3. "Ruby, My Dear" – 5:40
4. "In Walked Bud" – 5:53
5. "Lulu's Back In Town" (Al Dubin/Harry Warren) – 5:55
6. "Reflections" – 6:09
7. "Work" – 7:07
8. "Rhythm-a-Ning" – 4:57
9. "Bemsha Swing" – 6:27
10. "Smoke Gets in Your Eyes" (Otto Harbach/Jerome Kern) – 5:00

== Personnel ==
- Bobby Broom – guitar
- Kobie Watkins – drums
- Dennis Carroll – bass

Production

- Bobby Broom – producer
- Josh Richter – recording and mixing
- Allan Tucker – mastering
- Mark Sheldon – photos
- John Bishop – cover design
