= Dawn Hampton =

American singer-songwriter

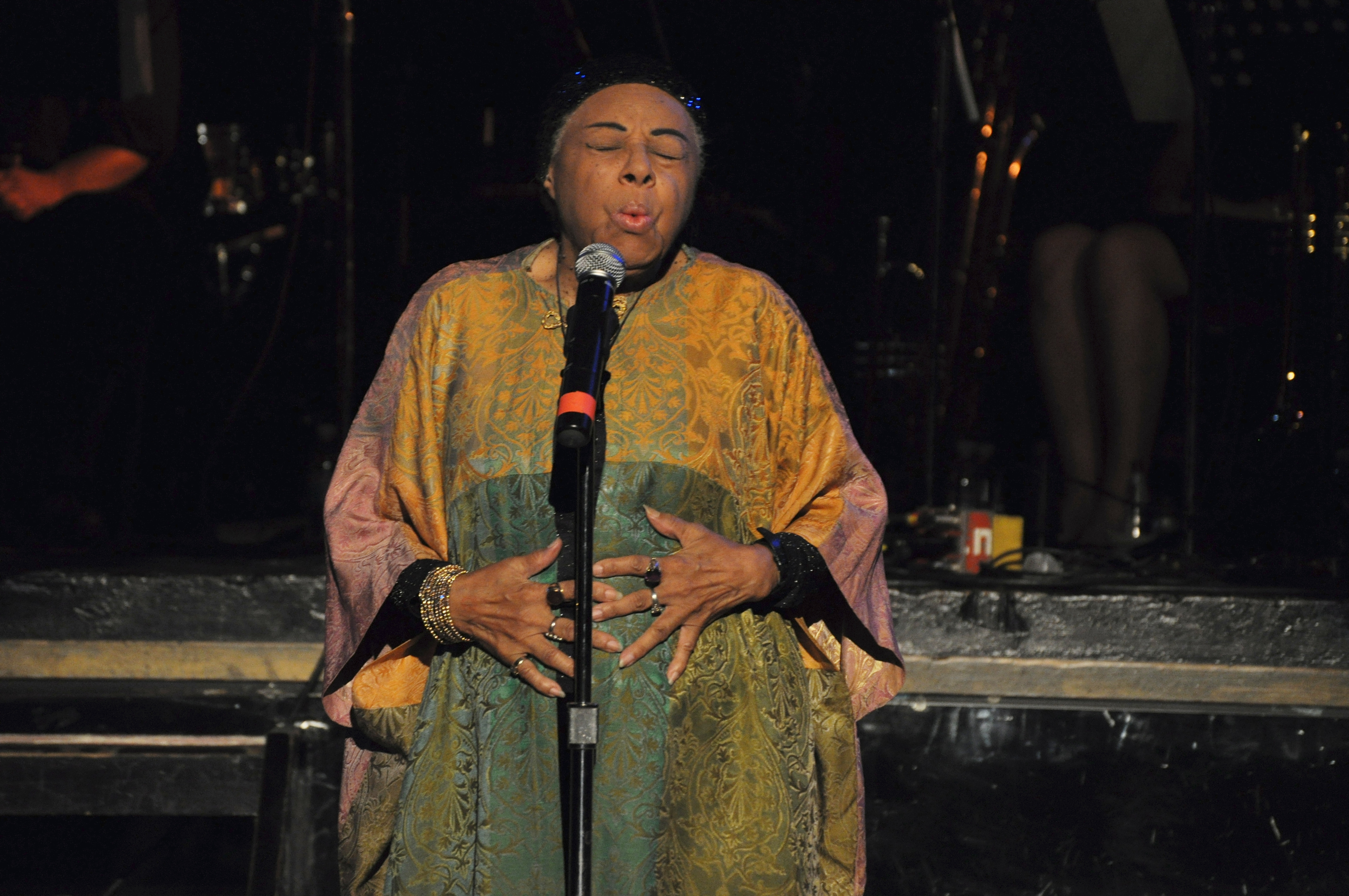
- Photographed in 2009

Background information
- Born: Dawn Hampton; June 9, 1928; Middletown, Ohio
- Died: September 25, 2016 (aged 88) New York City
- Genres: Jazz, blues, swing
- Occupations: Dancer, musician, singer-songwriter
- Instruments: Vocals, saxophone

Dawn Hampton (June 9, 1928 – September 25, 2016) was an American cabaret and jazz singer, saxophonist, dancer, and songwriter. Hampton began her lifelong career as a musical entertainer touring the Midwest as a three-year-old member of the Hampton family's band The Hampton Sisters in the late 1930s. During World War II and into early 1950s, she performed as part of a quartet with her three sisters and in a jazz band with all nine of her surviving siblings. Hampton moved to New York City in 1958 to pursue a solo career as a cabaret singer. She became a singer/songwriter and dancer, which included off-Broadway theatre performances and swing dancing in Hollywood films. Along with other members of the musical Hamptons, she was a recipient of the State of Indiana's Governor Arts Award (1991) and honored at the Indy Jazz Fest (2000) in Indianapolis, Indiana.

== Early life and education ==
Dawn Hampton was born on June 8, 1928, in Middletown, Ohio, to Laura and Clarke "Deacon" Hampton. Clarke Hampton was born in Batavia, Ohio, in 1877, to William and Elizabeth Hampton, and studied music and art while attending a military academy in Xenia, Ohio. He married Laura Burford in 1908.

The Hamptons were a musical family. Both parents played musical instruments: Clarke played saxophone and drums; Laura played piano. The family included twelve children, three of whom died young. The nine surviving children included four daughters (Carmalita, Aletra, Virtue, and Dawn) and five sons (Clarke Jr. "Duke", Marcus, Russell "Lucky", Maceo, and Locksley "Slide"). The siblings were trained by their parents to play musical instruments. Dawn learned to play the alto saxophone and later became a vocalist who specialized in ballads. Under their father's leadership the Hampton children began performing in the family band at a young age. Dawn joined the family band and its vaudeville act at the age of three, beginning her long career as a musical performer.

The Hampton family settled in Indianapolis, Indiana, in 1938, when Dawn was tens years old. She attended Indianapolis Public Schools, including Crispus Attucks High School, but left to perform with the Hampton family band. Although she did not have professional music training, four of her brothers (Marcus, "Lucky", Maceo, and "Slide") took lessons as the MacArthur Conservatory of Music.

Dawn Hampton never married and had no children. Her youngest brother, "Slide" Hampton, is a two-time Grammy Award-winner and a noted jazz trombonist, composer, and arranger. She is also a distant cousin of Lionel Hampton.

== Career ==
Hampton began her career as a musical entertainer in the 1930s with the Hampton family's band. During 1940s and early 1950s she performed in a quartet with her three sisters and with all nine of her surviving siblings in Duke Hampton's Orchestra, her older brother's jazz band. She moved to New York City in 1958 to pursue a solo career as a cabaret singer. Hampton also became a singer/songwriter and dancer, which included off-Broadway theatre performances and swing dancing in Hollywood films.

=== Early years ===
The Hampton family initially formed as the Deacon Hampton's Pickaninny Band, but due to the negative racial connotations, the band changed its name and became known as Deacon Hampton's Family Band (also referred to as the Deacon Hampton and His Band or Deacon Hampton and the Cotton Pickers). The family traveled the Midwest, especially in Pennsylvania, West Virginia, Kentucky, and Indiana, performing at fairs, carnivals, tent shows, and private parties. In addition to dancing and presenting comedy skits, the band performed a variety of musical genres, including ragtime, blues, dixieland, polka, and jazz music. In 1938, after an unsuccessful trip to California to find work in the Hollywood film industry, the family relocated to Indianapolis, Indiana, where the Hamptons continued to tour and perform in local clubs.

During World War II the family band when on hiatus while Hampton and her sisters found work at defense plants in Indianapolis and some of the Hampton men served in the military. Hampton founded a short-lived quartet with her sisters called The Hamptonians, and later performed as The Hampton Sisters, while their older brother, "Duke", formed a jazz band.

After the war Hampton played alto and tenor saxophones with the Duke Hampton Orchestra. She also sang and danced while touring with the group in the Midwest and the South. Duke Hampton's band also played at the Cotton Club and the Sunset Terrace on Indiana Avenue, the center of Indianapolis's jazz scene and the entertainment hub of the city's black community, as well as other venues in town. The fourteen-piece group included the nine surviving Hampton siblings, as well as several well-known Indiana Avenue musicians such as Alonzo "Pookie" Johnson and Bill Penick on saxophone, trombonist/bass player Eugene Fowlkes, and drummers Sonny Johnson, Dick Dickerson, and Thomas Whitted. Dawn Hampton was also a member of the group when it later became house band at the Cotton Club in Cincinnati, Ohio.

In May 1952 Hampton and her siblings performed in concert at New York City's Carnegie Hall as one of the winners in a Pittsburgh Courier popularity poll of its readers. Duke Hampton's band appeared on the same bill as the Lionel Hampton band, the Nat King Cole Trio, and singer Billy Eckstein. Shortly thereafter, Hampton appeared with her brother's band when it returned to New York City to perform at Harlem's Apollo Theater and the Savoy Ballroom. While performing as The Hampton Sisters, Dawn, Aletra, Virtue, and Carmalita Hampton signed a recording contract in 1954. Their first 78 rpm recording was "Hey Little Boy", a fast-tempo tune, and "My Heat Tells Me", a love ballad.

=== Songwriter and cabaret singer ===
In 1958 Hampton moved to New York City to pursue a solor career as a songwriter and cabaret singer. Later that year she joined the cast of "Greenwich Village, U.S.A.", an off-Broadway production at the Bon Soir musical theater.

In the early 1960s Hampton was contracted as a house singer at the Lions Den nightclub. in 1964 she nearly lost the use of her voice due to some damage to her vocal chords, but recovered. Hampton wrote and recorded her signature song, "Life Is What You Make It", also the title song of her CD, in response to the ordeal. Although she experienced a loss of vocal volume, Hampton kept performing as a cabaret singer in New York City for another twenty years, including performances at the Stonewall Inn in Greenwich Village.

During the 1970s and 1980s Hampton continued her career as a cabaret performer in the New York City area. In 1972 she performed at the Continental Baths with artists such as Cab Calloway, Bette Midler, and Barry Manilow. In 1989 she collaborated with Mark Nadler to write music and lyrics for Red Light, a honky-tonk mini-opera that received a Manhattan Association of Cabarets (MAC) award in 1990. Hampton and Nadler also collaborated on An Evening with Dawn Hampton. The show enjoyed an extended run at Don't Tell Mama, a West 46th Street music venue.

In 1990 Hampton collaborated on music and lyrics for the play, Madame C. J. Walker. In 1992, along with Frankie Manning and Sonny Allen, she appeared as a dancer in the Lindy Hop swing dance scene in Spike Lee's movie, Malcolm X.

== Later years ==
In the 2000s, during a time of renewed interest in swing dancing, Hampton continued to perform as a dancer and teacher. She taught dance workshops all over the world, including at the Herräng Dance Camp in Herräng, Sweden. She also appeared in The Unforgettable Hampton Family (2011), a PBS documentary film about the lives of her musical family members. In addition, Hampton was a member of the cast of Alive and Kicking (2016), a documentary about swing dancing.

== Death and legacy ==
Hampton died on September 25, 2016, in New York City at the age of eighty-eight. She is remembered as a longtime musical entertainer and dancer, as well as a songwriter, and is best known for her performances as a cabaret singer and jazz musician. Critics called Hampton a "singer's singer" and the "Queen of Cabaret."

== Awards and honors ==
- New York's Private Lives magazine recognized Hampton's career as a vocalist with a Lifetime Achievement in Cabaret Award.
- Along with other members of the Hampton family, she was a recipient of the State of Indiana's Governor Arts Award (1991) and honored at the Indy Jazz Fest (2000) in Indianapolis.
