= Pharez Whitted =

American jazz trumpeter and educator

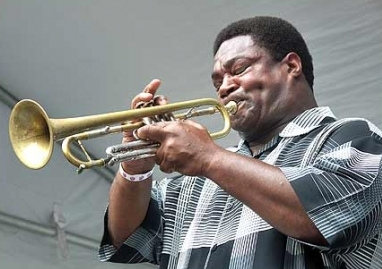
- Whitted at the 2005 Indy Jazz Fest

Background information
- Born: August 26, 1960 (age 65); Indianapolis, Indiana, U.S.
- Genres: Jazz, jazz fusion, soul jazz, funk
- Occupation: Musician
- Instrument: Trumpet
- Years active: 1982–present
- Label: Owl
- Website: www.pharezwhitted.com

Pharez Whitted is an American jazz trumpeter, composer, band leader and educator from Indianapolis, Indiana. In January 2011, Whitted was nominated for the 10th Annual Independent Music Awards in the Jazz Album category for Transient Journey.[2] In December 2016 he was named one of six "Chicagoans of the Year" by the Chicago Tribune.[3]

== Biography ==
Born in Indianapolis in 1960, Whitted grew up in a family of renowned jazz musicians that included his mother, Virtue Hampton Whitted, his aunt Dawn Hampton, and his uncle, the legendary Slide Hampton. His father, Thomas, played drums with Freddie Hubbard and Wes Montgomery, both natives of Indianapolis. Whitted played football and studied music at DePauw University and earned a master's degree from the Jacobs School of Music at Indiana University, Bloomington.

He has worked with George Duke, Slide Hampton, Elvin Jones, Ramsey Lewis, Branford Marsalis, Wynton Marsalis, Roy Meriwether, The O'Jays, Lou Rawls, The Temptations, Kirk Whalum, John Mellencamp, and Indiana University classmate and The Tonight Show bassist Bob Hurst. Whitted wrote, produced, and arranged his first two albums for Motown. He co-produced the album People Make the World Go 'Round. His album Transient Journey was released in 2010 by the jazz label Owl Studios.

Whitted has performed throughout the United States and overseas, including shows at the 1988 Presidential Inauguration, The Arsenio Hall Show, The Billboard Music Awards, Carnegie Hall, and the MoTown Music Showcase. He played in the jazz orchestra of 2023 Chicago on stage adaptation of the Duke Ellington-Billy Strayhorn Nutcracker, "Sugar Hill." He currently leads a quintet with a revolving cast of players including Bobby Broom, Eddie Bayard, Julius Tucker, Dennis Carroll, Kyle Swan, Jeremiah Hunt, Kobie Watkins, Keith Brooks, Ron Perillo, Andrew Toombs, Lovell Bradford, Jon Wood, Greg Artry and others. He is jazz director of Chicago's Youth Symphony Orchestra and works with Jazz at Lincoln Center and Ravinia's Jazz Scholar program. Whitted has taught nearly nonstop since earning a master’s degree from Indiana. Before focusing on youth education, he taught at Ohio State University and Chicago State University. He is currently an instructor of jazz studies at Northern Illinois University.

== Awards and honors ==
In January 2011, Whitted was nominated for the 10th Annual Independent Music Awards in the Jazz Album category for Transient Journey. In December 2016 he was named one of six "Chicagoans of the Year" by the Chicago Tribune.

== Discography ==
=== As leader ===
- 1994 Pharez Whitted (Motown)
- 1996 Mysterious Cargo (Motown)
- 2010 Transient Journey (Owl)
- 2012 For the People (Origin)
- 2014 Tree of Life (Truth Revolution)
- 2021 Pharaoh Smooth (Get Whitted Music)
- 2026 The Lindy Bop (Get Whitted Music)

=== As guest ===
- 1991 John Mellencamp, Whenever We Wanted
- 1998 Jimmy Coe, Say What
- 2005 Nicci Cheeks, Hip Hop Love Jazz
- 2007 Ari Brown, Live at the Green Mill
- 2009 Kobie Watkins, Involved
