= The Bobby Broom Trio =

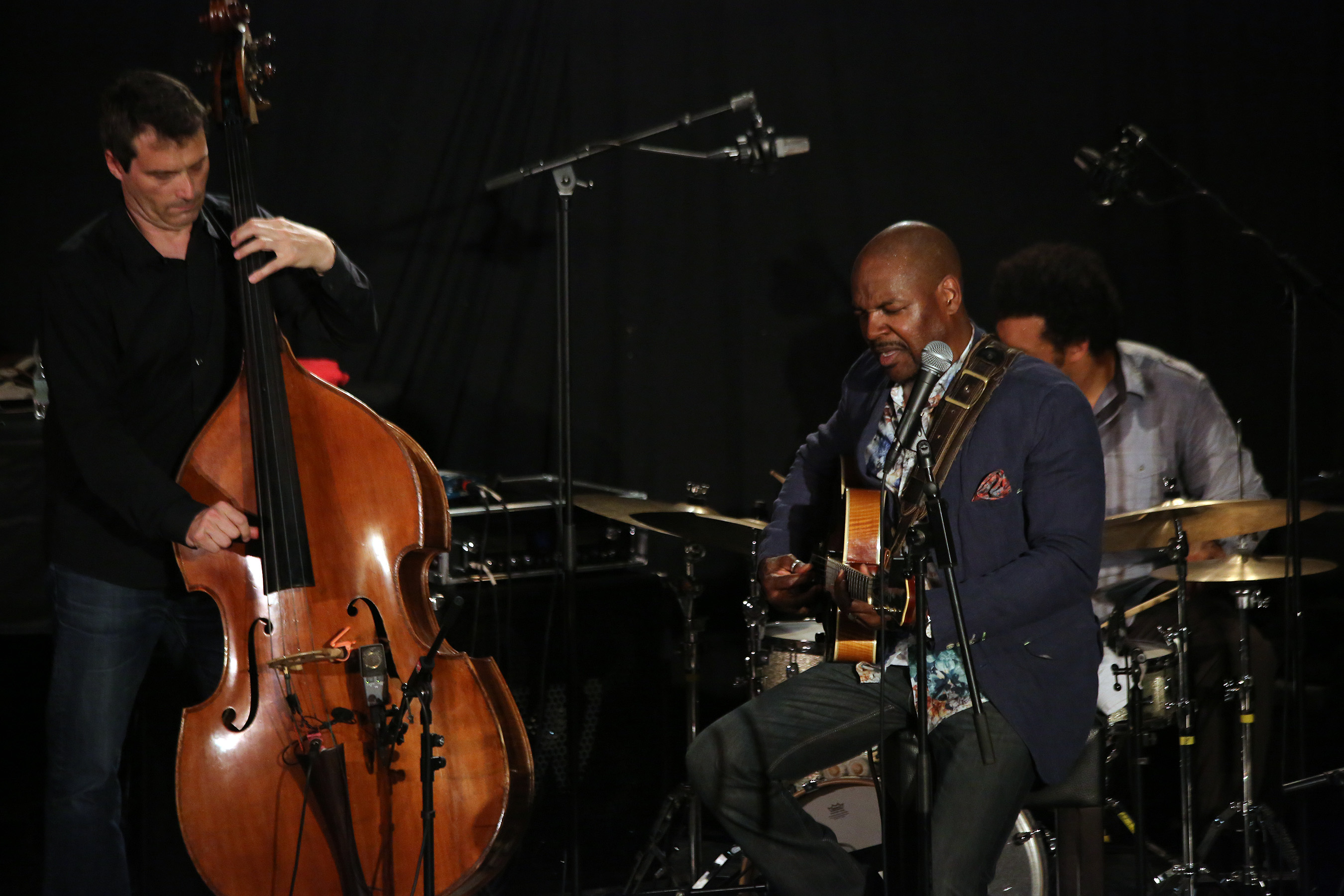
- At the INNtöne Jazzfestival, May 18, 2013: Bobby Broom (guitar), Dennis Carroll (bass), Makaya McCraven (drums)

Background information
- Origin: Chicago, Illinois, U.S.
- Genres: Jazz
- Years active: 2000–
- Label: Origin
- Members: Bobby Broom; Dennis Carroll; Makaya McCraven
- Past members: Kobie Watkins
- Website: bobbybroom.com

The Bobby Broom Trio is an American jazz trio based in Chicago, Illinois, that was founded by guitarist Bobby Broom in 1992. The group began under the name, Bobby Broom and the Big Deal Trio, and included then-electric bassist Dennis Carroll and drummer, George Fludas. They held a weekly, Sunday-night engagement for two to three years at a club called The Underground Wonderbar.

In 2000 Broom reconfigured the group, adding Dennis Carroll's upright bass and changing drummers to Dana Hall. The official Bobby Broom Trio began with the release of their 2001 recording, Stand! However, in 1997 the Trio had begun another regular weekly engagement, every Tuesday at Pete Miller's Steak House in Evanston, IL. The unassuming, unlikely jazz venue became noted as a destination for premiere (often world-class) jazz music. It became a regular stop for local and/or out-of-town jazz fans, as well as students and aspiring jazz musicians such as Marquis Hill, Christopher McBride, Greg Ward, and so many other young musicians, especially young local and regional jazz guitarists. Broom's residency at the venue was first recognized nationally when it was included in National Public Radio's annual New Year's Eve club-hopping, syndicated broadcast, NPR's Toast of The Nation in 2002.

In around 2006 the drum seat was replaced by drummer Kobie Watkins, who after subbing for Hall for a couple of years (since 2003 or '04), has maintained the chair most often for the past 20 years. He was a catalyst as the group began to hit its stride in the mid aughts. The weekly gig at Pete Miller's not only developed Broom's following, but it also helped to hone the group's sound and chemistry, and was a laboratory and springboard for many of their recordings during that period. Beginning with their 2006 debut as a group, Song and Dance, more evidence of their development can be heard on recordings like "Bobby Broom Plays for Monk", which peaked at #2 on the JazzWeek national jazz radio airplay chart and The Way I Play, Live In Chicago. The latter of those recordings (as well as others during this period) has become influential to young, millennial jazz guitarists. Most notably, Andrew Renfroe and Cecil Alexander.

Beginning around 2011, Drummer Makaya McCraven was an alternate for live performances and joined the group as its regular drummer in 2014. He appeared on The group's 2012 Upper West Side Story and 2014's My Shining Hour. In 2013 the trio toured Europe, performing at festivals and club venues in Germany, Austria, and Switzerland. They appeared at the Chicago Jazz Festival in 2014 and appeared at clubs in Chicago and around North America.

The album My Shining Hour peaked at No. 3 on the JazzWeek charts and was submitted for the consideration round for a 2015 Grammy Award. Broom continues to record and perform in varying configurations. Most recently with The Bobby Broom Keyed Up Quartet and for a special project with the Chicago Jazz Orchestra plus strings. Both of these recordings include the core Trio with Carroll and Watkins. Broom also performs and records with the Bobby Broom Organi-Sation, his organ trio.
