= Mike Mangan (musician) =

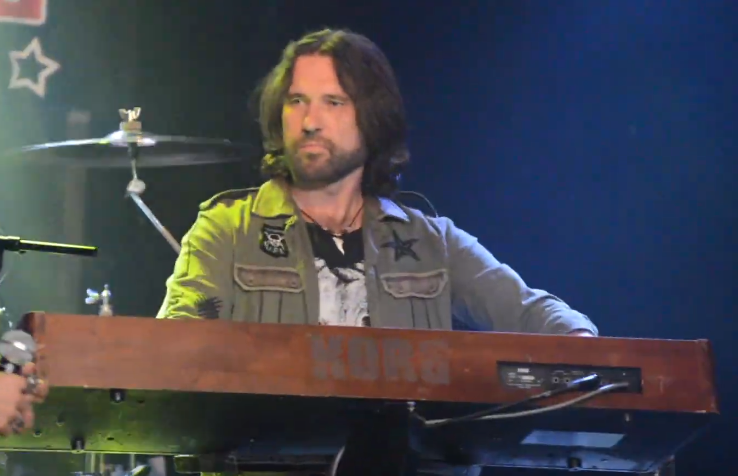
- Mangan in 2018

Background information
- Genres: Rock; jazz rock; funk rock
- Occupations: Singer–songwriter; musician; composer
- Instruments: Keyboards; vocals; harmonica
- Label: P-Vine Records
- Website: www.mikemangan.com

Mike Mangan is an American singer–songwriter and composer from Brookfield, Wisconsin, United States, who specializes in the Hammond B3 Organ. Mangan is known for his percussive playing technique and his use of effects pedals on the Hammond Organ.

== Career ==
Mike Mangan is best known for being the keyboardist for The Cult. Mangan is also known for his bands 'Big Organ Trio', which he formed in Los Angeles, CA in 2003, and 'Rebel House Radio', which he formed in 2015. Mangan also currently plays with Gilby Clarke in his band 'The Keef Richards' and is the former touring organist for Glenn Hughes.

In 2006 Mangan's trio was signed to P-Vine Records via Velour Records and subsequently toured Japan in 2007. In 2009 the band was officially renamed "Mike Mangan's Big Organ Trio".

Mangan has also played with Keith Emerson, Marc Ford, Particle, Papa Grows Funk, and has opened for bands and artists such as Robby Krieger, Leo Nocentelli, Melvin Seals and the Jerry Garcia Band, Dr. Lonnie Smith, Mike Clark, Paul Jackson, Robben Ford, Stanton Moore, Umphrey's McGee, Karl Denson, Benevento/Russo Duo, The New Mastersounds, and Will Bernard.

Mangan has performed at events such as 10,000 Lakes Music Festival, Fillmore Jazz Festival, Squaw Valley Funk Fest, Topanga Earth Day Festival, and Japan Jazz/Funk Expo and has received reviews in publications such as Keyboard Magazine.

== Discography ==
- Big Organ Trio - (independent release), 2005 [with Big Organ Trio]
- Big Organ Trio - (Japanese release) P-Vine/Velour Records, 2007 [with Big Organ Trio]
- Unwound - P-Vine Records, 2010 [with Mike Mangan's Big Organ Trio]
- Return Of Jazz Funk: Jazzfunk Never Dies - P-Vine Records, 2011 [with Big Organ Trio]

== Sources ==
- Official Hammoond Organ Co USA Artist Page
- Chris Clark, "Jambands.com" July 24, 2007
- Nancy Bianconi, "Nohoartsdistrict.com' July 5, 2010
- Organ Trio, Wikipedia
- Pinball Number Count, Wikipedia
