= Kobie Watkins =

American drummer

- Born: July 26, 1975 (age 50)
- Origin: Chicago, Illinois United States
- Genres: Hard bop Post-bop; Progressive jazz Soul-jazz; Jazz-funk; Latin; Gospel
- Occupations: Musician, Composer
- Instrument: Drums
- Label: Origin Records
- Member of: The Bobby Broom Organi-Sation
- Formerly of: Kobie Watkins Grouptet; The Bobby Broom Trio
- Website: www.kwgmusic.com

Kobie Watkins (born July 26, 1975) is an American drummer and percussionist in Jazz, Latin, and Gospel music genres, and a music educator.

== Biography ==
Kobie Watkins was born July 26, 1975, in Chicago. He began as a small child listening and watching his father, Alious C. Watkins, who was a drummer for their church.

Watkins studied percussion at Vandercook College of Music with vibraphonist Marc Max Jacoby and percussionist Kevin Lepper at school by day. By night, Watkins spent time playing jazz with alto saxophonist Dennis Winslett, performing in the pit at local theaters and performed for cabaret shows. He earned his bachelor's degree in music education from Vandercook in 1999. He received his Master of Music from Northwestern University in jazz pedagogy in 2003.

He became a public school band director. At night, he played gigs around the Chicago area and throughout the United States. Watkins developed the nickname the Swing Master of Chicago. He was depicted in a front-page article in the Joliet, Illinois’- Herald, -a local newspaper titled, "Teacher has Alter Ego as Jazz Musician."

== Honors ==
- Walt Disney World American All-Star Band, Magic Kingdom (Orlando, FL) - 1998

== Side man ==
Watkins has played in groups on stage and in recordings for:

- Sonny Rollins
- Kurt Elling
- Curtis Fuller
- Arturo Sandoval
- George Coleman
- Ira Sullivan
- Sonny Fortune
- Fred Anderson
- Ari Brown
- Willie Pickens
- Bobby Broom
- The Bobby Broom Trio
- The Bobby Broom Organi-Sation
- Orbert Davis
- Ken Chaney
- Ron Perrillo
- Bethany Pickens
- Ryan Cohan
- Dennis Winslett
- Jarrard Harris
- James Austin
- Kim Burrell
- Julie Dexter
- Javier
- Kendra Ross
- Chris Robinson
- Dom Flemons

Kobie has toured extensively in Africa, Europe, Asia, Canada, South America and the United States.

== As music educator ==
Watkins worked with Wynton Marsalis at Martin Luther King High School in Chicago, IL. at a clinic for high school students learning Jazz. He worked with the Ravinia Jazz Mentors program of the Chicago Public High School system, as well as "Attention for Boys," a MusicAlive mentoring and teaching program that was started by Orbert Davis and Mark Ingram for inner-city youth ages 8 to 18 years.

Since 2004, Watkins led a teen band in worship at a Christian Teen Camp in Lake Geneva, Wisconsin. He works with the Triangle Youth Jazz Ensembles in North Carolina.

== Recordings ==
=== As leader ===
- Involved (2006) – Origin 82532

=== As sideman ===
- In Circles – The Spin Quartet (Origin 82676)
- Upper West Side Story – Bobby Broom (Origin 82617)
- Bobby Broom Plays for Monk – Bobby Broom (Origin 82534)
- The Way I Play: Live In Chicago – Bobby Broom (Origin 82504)
- Song And Dance – Bobby Broom (Origin 82475)
- Jamalot (Live) – The Bobby Broom Organi-Sation (Steele)
