= Deep Blue Organ Trio =

American jazz organ trio

The Deep Blue Organ Trio was an American, Chicago-based jazz organ trio, made up of jazz guitarist Bobby Broom, Hammond B3 organist Chris Foreman and drummer Greg Rockingham. In their individual careers they have performed and recorded with many prominent musicians in the field of jazz and blues. The group disbanded in 2013 after opening for Steely Dan's 2013, "Mood Swings" summer tour.

Although they played together beginning in 1992, they officially formed this co-led group in 2000 and recorded four albums, two for Delmark Records in 2004 and 2006 and two for Origin Records, one in 2007 and one in 2011. The trio displayed elements of the soul jazz and hard bop styles of jazz, and utilized blues music as well as the rhythm & blues and funk music mediums in their music. They were a most celebrated Chicago-based ensemble that held steady, Tuesday-night performances for nine years straight (beginning in 2004) at Chicago's historic, Green Mill Lounge (one of North America's oldest jazz venues). Their final recording, a tribute to Stevie Wonder entitled, Wonderful!, reached number 1 on the JazzWeek national jazz radio chart on September 14, 2011.

== Discography ==
- Deep Blue Bruise (Delmark, 2004)
- Goin' to Town: Live at the Green Mill (Delmark, 2006)
- Folk Music (Origin, 2007)
- Wonderful! (Origin, 2011)

=== DVDs ===
- Goin' to Town: Live at the Green Mill (Delmark, 2006)
