= Bobby Broom =

American jazz guitarist, composer, and educator

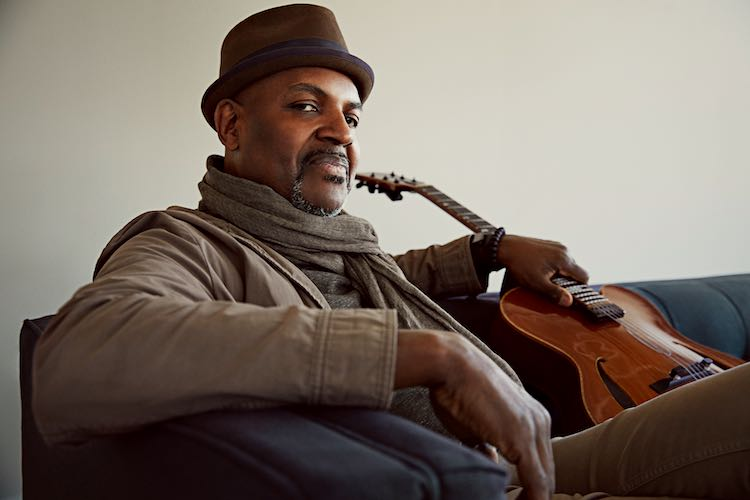
- Broom in 2024

Background information
- Birth name: Robert Broom Jr.
- Born: January 18, 1961 (age 64); New York City, United States
- Genres: Jazz, jazz fusion, jazz funk, soul jazz
- Occupation: Musician
- Instrument: Guitar
- Labels: Delmark, Arista, Criss Cross, Fantasy, Origin
- Website: www.bobbybroom.com

Robert Broom Jr. (born January 18, 1961) is an American jazz guitarist, composer, and educator. He was born and raised in New York City, then moved to Chicago, which has been his home town since 1984. He performs and records with The Bobby Broom Trio and his organ group, The Bobby Broom Organi-Sation. While versed in the traditional jazz (bebop and post-bop) idioms, Broom draws from a variety of American music forms, such as funk, soul, R&B, and blues.

== Career ==
Broom was born in Harlem (1961) and raised on New York City's Upper West Side (1970s). Broom began studying the guitar at age 12, taking lessons first in folk music. A year later, he began studies with jazz guitarist Jimmy Carter in Harlem, where he took weekly lessons for the next two years. He attended the High School of Music and Art (Laguardia High School of Performing Arts), where he played in the jazz ensemble and received an award for Outstanding Jazz Improvisation during his senior year. Broom began his career while still in high school, performing at New York clubs with Charlie Parker pianists, Al Haig, and Walter Bishop, Jr. In 1977 he played at Carnegie Hall in a concert with Sonny Rollins and Donald Byrd.

He attended the Berklee College of Music from 1978–79, then returned to New York to pursue his career while attending Long Island University. He began working in New York as guitarist for Art Blakey and The Jazz Messengers, Dave Grusin, Hugh Masekela, and Tom Browne and signed a contract with GRP Records. In the 1985, he moved to Chicago. He formed The Bobby Broom Trio in 1990, the Deep Blue Organ Trio with Chris Foreman and Greg Rockingham in 1999, and The Bobby Broom Organi-Sation in 2014.

Broom's childhood heroes include Wes Montgomery, George Benson, and Pat Martino. He has worked with Art Blakey, Max Roach, Stanley Turrentine, Kenny Garrett, Miles Davis, Dr. Lonnie Smith, Charles Earland, Dr. John, Kenny Burrell, Ron Blake, Eric Alexander, Ron Carter, and Ramsey Lewis.

In 2009 he recorded Bobby Broom Plays for Monk with its cover shot of the red wagon Monk used for the album Monk's Music.

Broom's first release of exclusively original compositions was Upper West Side Story (2012). The album reached No. 1. on the College Music Journal jazz chart and was in the Jazz Week and Down Beat Top Albums of 2012.

As an educator, Broom began his work in 1982 for Jackie McLean, Director of African American Music at Studies for the Hartt School of Music at the University of Hartford. Over the years Broom has also been a lecturer at the American Conservatory of Music (1986–1990), Chicago Musical College — Roosevelt University (1990–1994), The Thelonious Monk Institute of Jazz (1987), DePaul University (2002–2008) and North Park University. Since 2000, he has also mentored and taught Chicago high school students for the Ravinia Festival Organization's community outreach Jazz Scholar Program. In 2005 he attended Northwestern University for his master's degree in jazz pedagogy. Broom became a tenured, associate professor in 2022. Broom also engages in local and national jazz competitions as a judge and guest instructor, namely the Evanston Jazz Festival where he was the keynote speaker at its 2023 event.

His fourteenth recording as a leader, Keyed Up, was released in 2022 and picked up admiring reviews in the specialist jazz press.

In May of 2024, he released Jamalot (Live) on the Steele record label with his organ trio, The Bobby Broom Organi-Sation.

== Awards and honors ==
- DownBeat Critics' Poll 2012
- DownBeat Critics' Poll 2013
- DownBeat Critics' Poll 2014
- DownBeat Readers' Poll 2015

== Discography ==
=== As leader ===
- Clean Sweep (Arista GRP, 1981)
- Livin' for the Beat (Arista, 1984)
- No Hype Blues (Criss Cross, 1995)
- Waitin' and Waitin (Criss Cross, 1997)
- Modern Man (Delmark, 2001)
- Stand! (Premonition, 2001)
- Song and Dance (Origin, 2007)
- The Way I Play: Live in Chicago (Origin, 2008)
- Bobby Broom Plays for Monk (Origin, 2009)
- Upper West Side Story (Origin, 2012)
- My Shining Hour (Origin, 2014)
- Soul Fingers (Clean Sweep Music/MRI, 2018)
- Keyed Up (Clean Sweep Music/Steele, 2022)
- Jamalot (Live) (Clean Sweep Music/Steele, 2014 and 2019 [2024])

With Deep Blue Organ Trio

- Deep Blue Bruise (Delmark, 2004)
- Goin' to Town: Live at the Green Mill (Delmark, 2005 [2006])
- Folk Music (Origin, 2007)
- Wonderful! (Origin, 2011)

=== As sideman ===
With Tom Browne

- Love Approach (Arista GRP, 1980)
- Magic (Arista GRP, 1981)
- Rockin' Radio (Arista, 1983)

With Dr. John

- Trippin' Live (Surefire/Wind-Up, 1997)
- Anutha Zone (Point Blank/Virgin, 1998)
- Duke Elegant (Blue Note, 1999)
- Live at Montreux 1995 (Eagle, 2005)

With Weldon Irvine

- Weldon & the Kats (Nodlew Music, 1989)
- The Sisters (Saucerman, 1998)
- Young, Gifted and Broke (Shout! Productions, 2012)

With Sonny Rollins

- No Problem (Milestone, 1982)
- Reel Life (Milestone, 1982)
- Sonny, Please (Doxy/EmArcy, 2006)
- Road Shows Vol. 1 (Doxy/EmArcy, 2008)
- Road Shows Vol. 3 (Doxy/OKeh, 2014)
- Road Shows Vol. 4 (Doxy/OKeh, 2016)

With Sadao Watanabe

- Nice Shot! (Flying Disk, 1980)
- Orange Express (CBS/Sony, 1981)
- Good Time for Love (Elektra, 1986)

With others

- Eric Alexander, In Europe (Criss Cross, 1995)
- Poogie Bell, Exhibition Continues (Leopard, 2018)
- Kenny Burrell, Generation (Blue Note, 1987)
- Kenny Burrell, Pieces of Blue and the Blues (Blue Note, 1988)
- Chicago Jazz Orchestra, More Amor: A Tribute to Wes Montgomery (CJO Records, 2025)
- Ronnie Cuber, Cubism (Fresh Sound, 1992)
- Charles Earland, Front Burner (Milestone, 1988)
- Charles Earland, Third Degree Burn (Milestone, 1989)
- Charles Fambrough, Blues at Bradley's (CTI, 1993)
- Dave Grusin, Live in Japan (JVC, 1980)
- David Murray, The Tip (DIW, 1994)
- David Murray, Jug-a-Lug (DIW, 1995)
- Stanley Turrentine, Home Again (Elektra, 1982)
- Dave Valentin, Pied Piper (Arista GRP, 1981)
- Pharez Whitted, Transient Journey (Owl, 2010)
- Pharez Whitted, For the People (Origin, 2012)
- Bernard Wright, 'Nard (Arista GRP, 1981)
