= Chris Foreman (organist) =

American jazz musician

Chris Foreman is an American Chicago-based organist and pianist. He has recorded with the Deep Blue Organ Trio and the Kimberly Gordon Trio, and appears in the BT Productions video "Funk on the B-3". Foreman appears regularly at the Green Mill. In 2015, he released a CD, Now is the Time.

== Discography ==
=== As leader ===
- Now is the Time, (The Sirens, 2015)

With Deep Blue Organ Trio

- Deep Blue Bruise (Delmark, 2004)
- Goin' to Town: Live at the Green Mill (Delmark, 2005 [2006])
- Folk Music (Origin, 2007)
- Wonderful! (Origin, 2011)

With Kimberly Gordon

- Melancholy Serenade (The Sirens, 2004)
- Sunday (The Sirens, 2011)

With Red Holloway

- Go Red Go! (Delmark, 2008 [2009])

With Soul Message Band

- Soulful Days (Delmark, 2018 [2019])
- Full Circle with Jimmy Burns (Delmark, 2025)

== Sources ==
- Deep Blue Bruise (CD liner). Deep Blue Organ Trio. Chicago, IL, US: Delmark Records. 2004. DE 556. Archived from the original on 2007-09-28.
- Melancholy Serenade (CD liner). Kimberly Gordon Trio. Highland Park, IL, US: The Sirens Records, LLC. 2004. p. 3. SR5009. Archived from the original on 2007-07-06.
- Sunday (CD liner). Kimberly Gordon Organ Trio. Highland Park, IL, US: The Sirens Records, LLC. 2011. SR5018.
- Now is the Time (CD liner). Chris Foreman with special guests Andy Brown and Diane Ellis. Highland Park, IL, US: The Sirens Records, LLC. 2015. SR5022.
