= NUVO (newspaper) =

Newspaper in Indianapolis, Indiana

- A sample front page of NUVO
- Type: Alternative weekly
- Format: Tabloid
- Owner(s): NUVO, Inc.
- Publisher: Kevin McKinney
- Editor: Kevin McKinney
- Founded: March 14, 1990
- Language: English
- Headquarters: 3951 North Meridian Street; Suite 200; Indianapolis, Indiana; United States
- Circulation: 47,800 (2011); 25,000 (2018)
- Price: Free
- Website: Official website

NUVO is a news website and formerly print alternative weekly serving the Indianapolis, Indiana, metropolitan area. Locally owned and operated, it features news stories, music, food, theatre and film reviews and also has sections for classifieds and other advertisements. It was printed in a tabloid format and was available free at more than 900 locations around Indianapolis.

The paper frequently runs articles covering the happenings in area politics, music, culture, environment and the arts in the Indianapolis area.

The paper began publishing on March 14, 1990. "Best of Indy" awards are listed each year, covering a wide range of topics such as the best meal under $5, best sex shop, best local bands, best music venues, and the best radio and television personalities.

The print edition folded in March 2019 and the digital-only publication ceased operations in May 2020. That decision was reversed days later when the publication was given a deal on Internet hosting that allowed it to continue.
