= Jazz trombone =

Role of the trombone in jazz music

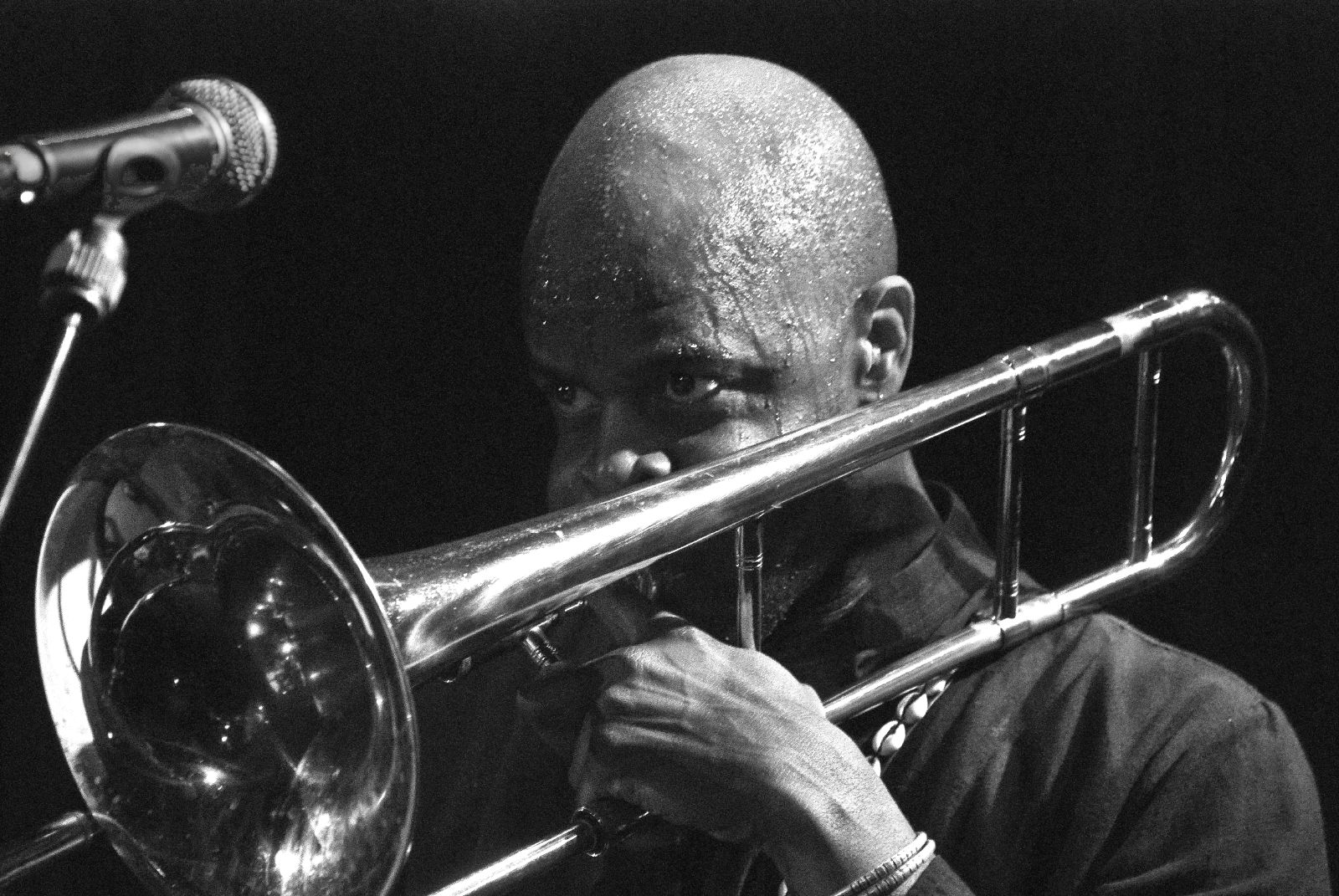
Craig Harris playing trombone

The trombone is a musical instrument from the brass instrument family. Trombone's first premiere in jazz was with Dixieland jazz as a supporting role within the Dixie Group. This role later grew into the spotlight as players such as J.J. Johnson and Jack Teagarden began to experiment more with the instrument, finding that it can fill in roles along with the saxophone and trumpet in bebop. The trombone has since grown to be featured in standard big band group setups with 3 to 5 trombones depending on the arrangement. A person who plays the trombone is called a trombone player or a trombonist.

== History of trombone in jazz ==
=== Traditional jazz trombone ===
Trombone first saw use in the jazz world with its entrance into traditional jazz where it played along with the chord changes, often connecting the seven to third or third to root resolutions of cadences, allowing the other musicians of the group to improvise along with it. In a standard dixie group, the players marched through the streets or were hauled around, playing in an open trailer. The trombone having a slide instead of valves or strings or holes for playing had difficult positioning themselves, and tended to sit in the back of the trailer, gaining the name "Tailgate Trombone". This style of playing included many trombone specific techniques such as growling, scoops, falls, and slides. These factors provided traditional jazz with its well known, almost "dirty" feel. The most famous tailgate trombonist was Edward "Kid" Ory. Even though the trombone was finally featured in jazz at this point, it was not until the swing era of jazz that the trombone actually stepped into the spotlight.

=== Swing era trombone ===
The swing era of jazz reached its peak in the 1930s, where the trombone was then popular. In a standard swing band there were 5 saxophones, 4 trumpets, 3 or 4 trombones and a rhythm section. This is when trombone started to stand out as a solo instrument, with players such as Jack Teagarden. Characteristic of the Teagarden style of trombone playing is a clean articulation, excellent high register and limited slide movement. This often results in pentatonic scales. Other famous trombone soloists in swing bands were Tricky Sam Nanton and Lawrence Brown in the Ellington Band, and Dickie Wells and Vic Dickenson in the Count Basie Orchestra. Several trombonists (e.g. Tommy Dorsey, Trummy Young) began to form their own swing bands, and allowed themselves to show off their instrument that had before been hidden behind the rest of the horns. When this happened, the standard style of playing switched away from the "tailgate trombone" style, and moved towards a lyrical and smooth form of playing. This revolutionized jazz trombone in a way that no player had thought possible before. This helped move trombone into the spotlight, as it became an instrument of lyrical, smooth, soft playing that people enjoyed listening to.

=== Bebop jazz trombone ===
As the era of swing jazz ended, the new style of bebop jazz emerged from the early 1940s. Bebop was a faster form of swing that was played for its own sake, as opposed to swing jazz, which was played for dancing. In this era, the trombone was less often played as a solo instrument, as many of the passages in the music were too technically fast for the playing style that had developed during the swing era, as that style was held back by the slide more so. The leading trombonists at the time also worked on adapting and creating a new style to follow the fast-paced bebop. The driving force of this stylistic movement was J.J. Johnson. He followed the influences of bebop jazz innovators Charlie Parker and Dizzy Gillespie while adding his own, smooth, slower form of playing over the fast tracks of bebop. J.J. Johnson eliminated most of the glissandos, rips, and other such effects from his playing, replacing them with a more precisely articulated style, enlivened by extended chords and alterations characteristic of bebop. Although this level of slide trombone virtuosity had been previously displayed in brass bands by the likes of Arthur Pryor it was new to jazz trombone.

== Jazz techniques and equipment ==
Typically jazz trombonists prefer to play on a standard small or medium bore tenor trombone with no extra attachments, which produce a brighter sound than large bore or valve-attachment trombones, and are more comfortable to play for extended periods of time in the extreme high range of the instrument. There are certain techniques that trombone players will prominently find in jazz music, or jazz inspired music, such as growling, scooping, falling, flutter tonguing, use of mutes, multiphonics, and even recently with some players, distortion effects.

=== Use of mutes ===
The trombone, like most other brass instruments, can have its sound altered through the use of mutes. There are many different types of mutes commonly used in a jazz context.

- Plunger Mute - A plunger mute is a plunger head that covers all or part of the open portion of the bell, producing a "wah wah" sound. One distinct example of this sound effect is the sound that adults make when they talk in the Peanuts cartoons.
- Cup Mute - The cup mute is a mute inserted inside of the bell, and completely covers it with its distinct cup shape. This mute gives a sound similar to that of a full cover plunger mute, and is typically used in lyrical and smooth jazz playing.
- Bucket Mute - The bucket mute is a mute that is normally shaped like a bucket that clips on to the trombone bell, and is filled with some form of dampening material in order to reduce the overall sound output of the instrument. In jazz, it is primarily used in soft ballads. The bucket mute effect can also be achieved by playing into a music stand.

=== Sound effects ===
Jazz trombonists make use of different techniques to change the quality of sound that exists their bell to create dramatic effect.

- Growling - Growling is a technique where a guttural throat sound is produced while playing a pitch, creating divided sound with the pitch. Primary examples of this are found in Dixieland/New Orleans jazz trombone parts, and in the Ellington Band by growl specialists Tricky Sam Nanton and Quentin Jackson.
- Glissando - A glissando is an unarticulated movement from one note to another. The trombone is one of the few instruments that can put into effect a true glissando, or an undisturbed movement from one pitch to the next (within a tritone movement at the most) simply by moving from an outer slide position to an inner slide position (or vice versa) without change of partial. This is another technique most common in Dixieland.
- Scoops and Falls - Scoops and falls are a technique where a pitch is approached from below or fallen off from, usually marked with a curved line in the sheet music heading up to or going from the note head to indicate directionality. A scoop is done by very quickly moving from an outside slide position to a close inner slide position (ex. Position 2 to Position 1), while a fall is the exact opposite motion. (inner position to outer position, ex. Position 1 to Position 2). Scoops and falls are common in Dixieland and in Swing Era jazz.
- Multiphonics - Multiphonics is a technique most commonly used for its distinct sound in newer age jazz. The most famous exponent of this technique is the German trombonist Albert Mangelsdorff. Multiphonics are performed on the trombone by playing a pitch, and then humming an interval above the pitch being played. This causes both pitches to come out the bell at the same time. The two pitches interfere in the instrument, creating a third tone, the difference tone.
